= 1903 college football rankings =

- Season: 1903
- Bowl season: 1903–04 bowl games
- End of season champions: Princeton

The 1903 college football season rankings included a ranking by Caspar Whitney for Outing.

== Caspar Whitney ==
Writing for Outing, alongside his All-America Eleven for 1903, Caspar Whitney ranked the top thirty-one teams in the country at the conclusion of the season.

Whitney is designated by the National Collegiate Athletic Association (NCAA) as a "major selector" of national championships, and his contemporary rankings in Outing for 1905–1907 are included in the NCAA college football records book.

Rank	Team	Record
1	Princeton	11–0
2	Dartmouth	9–1
3	Yale	11–1

== See also ==
- 1903 College Football All-America Team
