= 1903 Bucknell football team =

American college football season

1903 Bucknell football
- Conference: Independent
- Record: 4–5
- Head coach: George W. Hoskins (5th season)
- Captain: George Cockill

1903 Eastern college football independents records
	Conf.			Overall
Team	W	L	T	W		L		T
Princeton		–		11	–	0	–	0
Yale		–		11	–	1	–	0
Columbia		–		9	–	1	–	0
Dartmouth		–		9	–	1	–	0
Geneva		–		9	–	1	–	0
Holy Cross		–		8	–	2	–	0
Temple		–		4	–	1	–	0
Washington & Jefferson		–		8	–	2	–	0
Lehigh		–		9	–	2	–	1
Harvard		–		9	–	3	–	0
Penn		–		9	–	3	–	0
Army		–		6	–	2	–	1
Carlisle		–		6	–	2	–	1
Amherst		–		7	–	3	–	0
Lafayette		–		7	–	3	–	0
Cornell		–		6	–	3	–	1
Colgate		–		4	–	2	–	1
Penn State		–		5	–	3	–	0
Swarthmore		–		6	–	4	–	0
Dickinson		–		7	–	5	–	0
Brown		–		5	–	4	–	1
Syracuse		–		5	–	4	–	0
Fordham		–		1	–	1	–	0
Franklin & Marshall		–		5	–	5	–	1
Buffalo		–		4	–	4	–	0
Rutgers		–		4	–	4	–	1
Delaware		–		4	–	4	–	0
Villanova		–		2	–	2	–	0
Bucknell		–		4	–	5	–	0
Vermont		–		4	–	5	–	0
Tufts		–		5	–	8	–	0
Wesleyan		–		3	–	6	–	1
Springfield Training School		–		1	–	3	–	1
NYU		–		2	–	5	–	0
New Hampshire		–		2	–	6	–	1
Pittsburgh College		–		1	–	5	–	1
Western U. Penn.		–		1	–	8	–	1

The 1903 Bucknell football team was an American football team that represented Bucknell University as an independent during the 1903 college football season. Led by fifth-year head coach George W. Hoskins the team compiled a 4–5 record. George Cockill was the team captain.

== Schedule ==
Date	Time	Opponent	Site	Result	Attendance	Source
September 26		Wyoming Seminary	Lewisburg, PA	W 27–0		
October 3		vs. Carlisle	Williamsport, PA	L 0–12		
October 10		at Watertown	Watertown, NY	W 12–6		
October 17		at Cornell	Percy Field; Ithaca, NY	L 0–6		
October 21		at Princeton	University Field; Princeton, NJ	L 0–17		
October 31		at Penn	Franklin Field; Philadelphia, PA	L 6–47		
November 7		Lebanon Valley	Lewisburg, PA	W 47–6		
November 14		at Navy	Worden Field; Annapolis, MD	W 23–5		
November 26		at Watertown	Watertown, NY	L 6–22		
