= Carl S. Williams =

American football player and coach, and ophthalmologist (1872–1960)

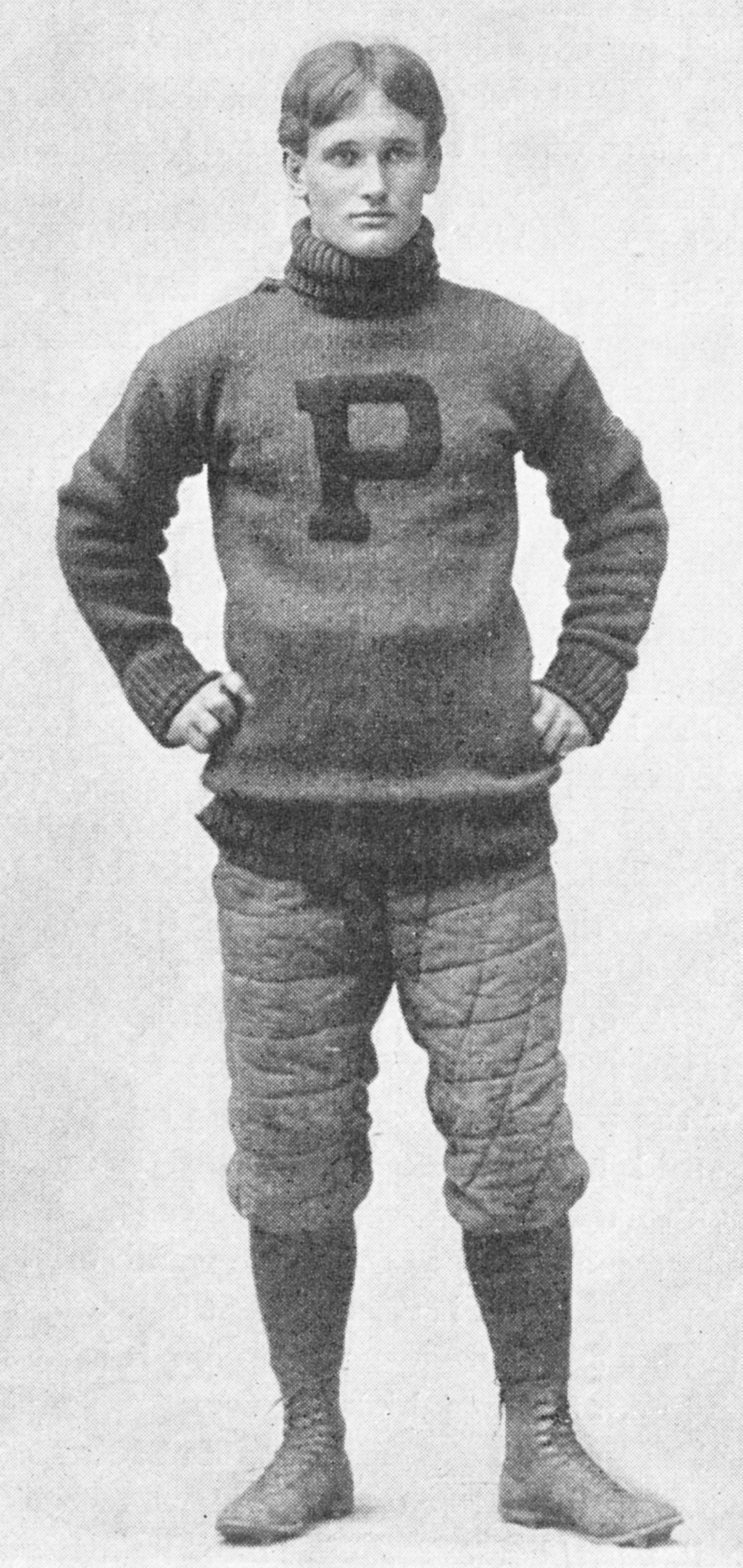
- Williams as a player at Penn, c. 1894

Biographical details
- Born: May 16, 1872; Chatham, Ohio, U.S.
- Died: November 8, 1960 (aged 88) near Pennsburg, Pennsylvania, U.S.

Playing career
- 1891–1892: Oberlin
- 1893–1895: Penn
- 1896–1897: Orange AC
- 1898–1899: Duquesne C&AC
- Position: Quarterback

Coaching career (HC unless noted)
- 1900–1901: Germantown Academy
- 1902–1907: Penn

Head coaching record
- Overall: 60–10–4 (college)

Accomplishments and honors

Championships
- As player: 2 national (1894, 1895); As coach: 2 national (1904, 1907)

Carl Sheldon "Cap" Williams (May 16, 1872 – November 8, 1960) was an American football player and coach, and an ophthalmologist. He played college football at Oberlin College and the University of Pennsylvania during the 1890s. He returned to Penn and served as the head football coach there from 1902 to 1907, compiling a record of 60–10–4. His Penn Quakers teams of 1904 and 1907 have been recognized as national champions. Williams later practiced ophthalmology for many years in Philadelphia.

== Early life and education ==
William was born on May 16, 1872, in Chatham, Ohio. A Wellington, Ohio, native, he graduated from the University of Pennsylvania in 1894 with a Bachelor of Science and a medical degree in 1897.

== Playing career ==
=== Oberlin ===
Williams played at Oberlin College in 1891 and 1892. The 1891 Yeomen played without a paid coach and went 2–2. The next year Williams was named captain. This team was coached by John Heisman. The Yeomen finished the season undefeated including a season opening victory over Ohio State. Williams scored the first touchdown early in the game which would become a 40–0 rout of the Buckeyes. During that season the Yeomen also claimed a second victory over the Buckeyes and a victory over Michigan but both schools dispute this.

=== Penn ===
On Heisman's advice, Williams transferred to his coach's former school, the University of Pennsylvania. He lettered three seasons at quarterback for the Red and Blue under renowned coach George Washington Woodruff. At the time Williams played quarterback under Woodruff, the forward pass was illegal. To advance the ball down the field, Woodruff coached his quarterback to "pass the ball with his foot." Rules at the time were that anybody that kicked the ball or anybody behind the kicker was allowed to recover the ball and retain possession. Williams was able to place his kicks with great accuracy to allow Penn to recover for a first down.

==== 1893 season ====
Williams began his first year at Penn backing up senior starting quarterback Louis "Bucky" Vail. When Vail fell ill in late October, Williams made an impressive debut in an 82–0 blowout of Lafayette. Two weeks later, he replaced an injured Vail in the second half against Yale, helping the Quakers score their only points in a 14–6 loss. The lone touchdown secured a moral victory for Penn: it ended Yale's historic run of 35 straight shutouts and 1,355 unanswered points dating back to 1890.

With Vail out the rest of the season, Williams started the final two games, a 50–0 win over Cornell and a 26–4 loss to Harvard. The Quakers finished with a 12–3 record, their only losses having come against the era's dominant "Big Three" programs of Princeton, Yale, and Harvard.

==== 1894 season ====
In 1894 Williams helped Penn to its first undefeated season. The 1894 team was retroactively named national champions by Parke H. Davis though Yale and Princeton were also retroactively named national champions by other organizations. The highlight of the season was a 12–0 victory over Princeton (only the second in 30 meetings) and an 18–4 victory over Harvard. The 1894 squad featured a talented backfield that consisted of Williams, Alden Knipe (halfback), George H. Brooke (fullback) and Winchester Osgood (halfback).

==== 1895 season ====
Williams was elected captain of Penn's 1895 team. As captain, he led Penn to another undefeated (14–0) season and a second-consecutive retroactive national title.

In selecting the 1895 All-America team, Caspar Whitney named Williams, Clint Wyckoff, and Clarence Fincke as his three "high-class candidates" for the quarterback position, but granted the honor to Wyckoff. Williams was awarded the quarterback spot on a less-recognized All-America team published by the New York newspaper The Sun.

==== Helping Heisman ====
Other than his undefeated seasons and national championships as a player and coach, Williams may be best known for his instrumental role in getting John Heisman back into coaching. Before the 1895 season, Walter Riggs, a graduate manager for the Auburn Tigers football team, wrote to Williams asking the Penn captain to suggest a suitable coach. He recommended his former coach at Oberlin, who at the time was a tomato farmer in Texas. Auburn hired Heisman, who went on to Hall of Fame career.

=== Post-collegiate ===
Williams continued playing football after college. In 1896, he and his former Penn backfield mates Knipe and Brooke, along with ex-Yale guard Pudge Heffelfinger, were recruited by the Orange Athletic Club to strengthen the team in a game against the rival Elizabeth Athletic Club. He returned to play for the Orange AC in 1897 before quarterbacking the Duquesne Country and Athletic Club (DC&AC) in 1898 and 1899. The DC&AC team at that time was openly professional.

Williams also worked as an official, including at the first known indoor regulation football game (Chicago vs. Michigan at the Chicago Coliseum on November 26, 1896). He officiated both of the only two games played by the 1896 Allegheny Athletic Association squad, which the Pro Football Hall of Fame credits as the first completely professional football team.

== Coaching career ==
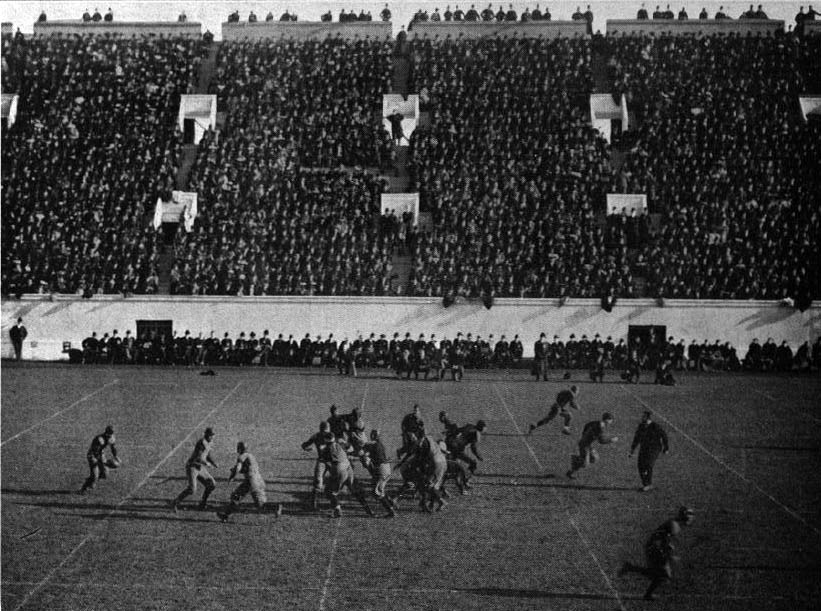
Penn game from 1904 national championship season

Williams became the head football coach of Germantown Academy in 1900, taking over from Bucky Vail, the same man he had replaced as Penn's starting quarterback seven years earlier. Williams held the position for two seasons.

In 1902 Williams succeeded his former coach, George W. Woodruff, at the University of Pennsylvania. When Williams first arrived he had to deal with a team and athletic department recovering from an undergraduate and dental student revolt that led to Woodruff to resign. The students were dissatisfied with the team's performance in the 1901 season and demanded more undergraduate say in athletic department and coaching. At the time the Athletic Association's board of directors was controlled by graduate and professional students. To protest Woodruff resignation all of Penn's graduate coaches resigned. Williams introduced a coaching system in which he served as head coach while being aided by a group of other alumni who served as assistant coaches. This system reduced the impact of losing any one coach or assistant coach. He quickly rebuilt the Quakers and led them to two retroactive national titles in 1904 and 1907. In just his third season as head coach, Williams and Penn posted a 12–0 record and the program's fourth national crown. This Quakers squad had a dominating defense that allowed only 0.3 points a game with Swarthmore the only school to score on them that season. The next year Williams led Penn to the second-straight undefeated season posting a 12–0–1 mark. Once again defense dominated with seven shutouts. Penn's fifth and Williams second (as a coach) retroactive national title came after an 11–1 campaign in his last year at the helm of the Quakers. He was replaced by Sol Metzger for the 1908 season. He finished his coaching career with a 60–10–4 record.

== Medical career and death ==
Williams earned degrees in ophthalmology the University of Heidelberg and London's Royal Ophthalmic College. He practiced ophthalmology for many years in Philadelphia, serving on the staff at Chesnut Hill Hospital, the Hospital of the University of Pennsylvania, and Georgetown Hospital. During World War I, Williams served as a captain in the Air Medical Corps, and later rose to the rank of major in the Army Medical Reserve Corps. He died on November 8, 1960, at the age of 88 near Pennsburg, Pennsylvania.

== College head coaching record ==
Year	Team	Overall	Conference	Standing	Bowl/playoffs
Penn Quakers (Independent) (1902–1907)
1902	Penn	9–4			
1903	Penn	9–3			
1904	Penn	12–0			
1905	Penn	12–0–1			
1906	Penn	7–2–3			
1907	Penn	11–1			
Penn:		60–10–4			
Total:		60–10–4			
National championship Conference title Conference division title or championship game berth

Note: Before 1936, national champions were determined by historical research and retroactive ratings and polls.
1907 poll results = Penn: Billingsley and Yale: Helms, National Championship Foundation, Parke H. Davis
1904 poll results = Penn: Helms, National Championship Foundation, Parke H. Davis and Michigan: Billingsley, National Championship Foundation
