= 1903 Lafayette football team =

American college football season

1903 Lafayette football
- Conference: Independent
- Record: 7–3
- Head coach: Alfred E. Bull (1st season)
- Captain: John Ernst
- Home stadium: March Field

1903 Eastern college football independents records
	Conf.			Overall
Team	W	L	T	W		L		T
Princeton		–		11	–	0	–	0
Yale		–		11	–	1	–	0
Columbia		–		9	–	1	–	0
Dartmouth		–		9	–	1	–	0
Geneva		–		9	–	1	–	0
Holy Cross		–		8	–	2	–	0
Temple		–		4	–	1	–	0
Washington & Jefferson		–		8	–	2	–	0
Lehigh		–		9	–	2	–	1
Harvard		–		9	–	3	–	0
Penn		–		9	–	3	–	0
Army		–		6	–	2	–	1
Carlisle		–		6	–	2	–	1
Amherst		–		7	–	3	–	0
Lafayette		–		7	–	3	–	0
Cornell		–		6	–	3	–	1
Colgate		–		4	–	2	–	1
Penn State		–		5	–	3	–	0
Swarthmore		–		6	–	4	–	0
Dickinson		–		7	–	5	–	0
Brown		–		5	–	4	–	1
Syracuse		–		5	–	4	–	0
Fordham		–		1	–	1	–	0
Franklin & Marshall		–		5	–	5	–	1
Buffalo		–		4	–	4	–	0
Rutgers		–		4	–	4	–	1
Delaware		–		4	–	4	–	0
Villanova		–		2	–	2	–	0
Bucknell		–		4	–	5	–	0
Vermont		–		4	–	5	–	0
Tufts		–		5	–	8	–	0
Wesleyan		–		3	–	6	–	1
Springfield Training School		–		1	–	3	–	1
NYU		–		2	–	5	–	0
New Hampshire		–		2	–	6	–	1
Pittsburgh College		–		1	–	5	–	1
Western U. Penn.		–		1	–	8	–	1

The 1903 Lafayette football team was an American football team that represented Lafayette College as an independent during the 1903 college football season. In its first season under head coach Alfred E. Bull, the team compiled a 7–3 record. John Ernst was the team captain. The team played its home games at March Field in Easton, Pennsylvania.

== Schedule ==
Date	Opponent	Site	Result	Source
September 26	Gallaudet		W 36–0	
October 3	Gettysburg		W 11–0	
October 10	Susquehanna		W 43–0	
October 17	Fordham		W 48–0	
October 24	at Navy	Worden Field; Annapolis, MD	W 6–5	
October 31	at NYU	Ohio Field; Bronx, NY	W 8–6	
November 7	at Princeton	University Field; Princeton, NJ	L 0–11	
November 14	Bloomsburg Normal		W 29–0	
November 21	at Lehigh	Bethlehem, PA	L 6–12	
November 26	Dickinson	March Field; Easton, PA	L 0–35	
