= 1903 Carlisle Indians football team =

American college football season

1903 Carlisle Indians football
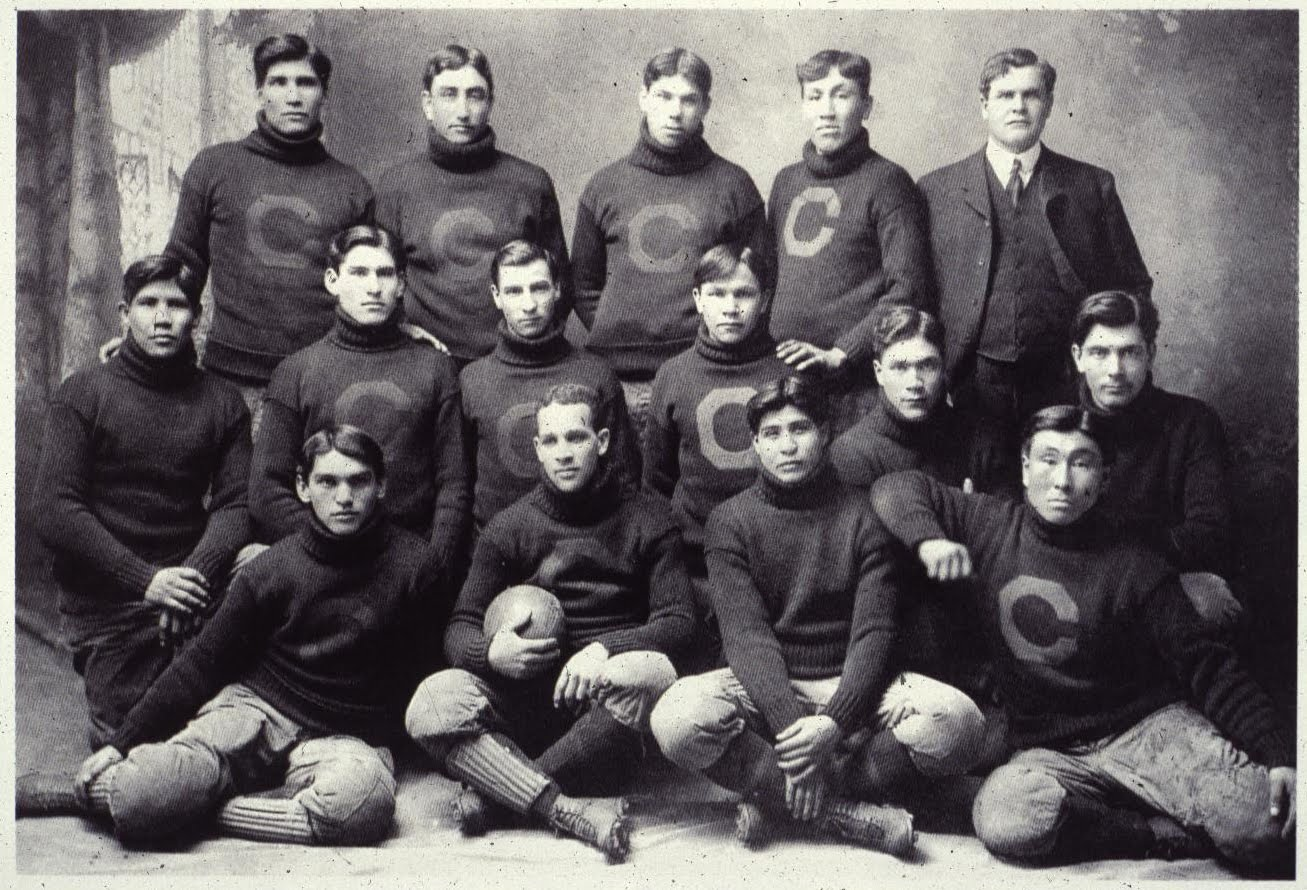
- Conference: Independent
- Record: 11–2–1
- Head coach: Pop Warner (5th season)
- Captain: Jimmy Johnson
- Home stadium: Indian Field

1903 Eastern college football independents records
	Conf.			Overall
Team	W	L	T	W		L		T
Princeton		–		11	–	0	–	0
Yale		–		11	–	1	–	0
Columbia		–		9	–	1	–	0
Dartmouth		–		9	–	1	–	0
Geneva		–		9	–	1	–	0
Holy Cross		–		8	–	2	–	0
Temple		–		4	–	1	–	0
Washington & Jefferson		–		8	–	2	–	0
Lehigh		–		9	–	2	–	1
Harvard		–		9	–	3	–	0
Penn		–		9	–	3	–	0
Army		–		6	–	2	–	1
Carlisle		–		6	–	2	–	1
Amherst		–		7	–	3	–	0
Lafayette		–		7	–	3	–	0
Cornell		–		6	–	3	–	1
Colgate		–		4	–	2	–	1
Penn State		–		5	–	3	–	0
Swarthmore		–		6	–	4	–	0
Dickinson		–		7	–	5	–	0
Brown		–		5	–	4	–	1
Syracuse		–		5	–	4	–	0
Fordham		–		1	–	1	–	0
Franklin & Marshall		–		5	–	5	–	1
Buffalo		–		4	–	4	–	0
Rutgers		–		4	–	4	–	1
Delaware		–		4	–	4	–	0
Villanova		–		2	–	2	–	0
Bucknell		–		4	–	5	–	0
Vermont		–		4	–	5	–	0
Tufts		–		5	–	8	–	0
Wesleyan		–		3	–	6	–	1
Springfield Training School		–		1	–	3	–	1
NYU		–		2	–	5	–	0
New Hampshire		–		2	–	6	–	1
Pittsburgh College		–		1	–	5	–	1
Western U. Penn.		–		1	–	8	–	1

The 1903 Carlisle Indians football team represented the Carlisle Indian Industrial School as an independent during the 1903 college football season. Led by fifth-year head coach Pop Warner, the Indians compiled a record of 11–2–1 and outscored opponents 274 to 62.

In 1903, an Indian team coached by Warner first employed its infamous "hidden-ball play" against heavily favored Harvard. Warner, as coach at Cornell, had already used it against Penn State in 1897, but it had not achieved much notice. Carlisle led Harvard at halftime, and hoping to keep the game's momentum, Warner elected to try the play on the ensuing kickoff. Harvard executed the kick, and the Indians formed a circle around the returner. With the aid of a specially altered jersey, the ball was placed up the back of the returner. The Indians broke the huddle and spread out in different directions. Each player feigned carrying the ball, except Dillon, the man with the ball up the back of his jersey. The ruse confused the Crimson players, and they scrambled to find the ball carrier. Dillon, with both his hands free, was ignored by the searching Harvard players, and he ran untouched into the end zone. With the score, Carlisle extended its lead to 11–0, but Harvard came back and eventually won 12–11. Nevertheless, the close match, and trick play, resulted in national attention. Warner had learned the trick from John Heisman while facing Auburn in 1895 during his tenure as coach of the Georgia Bulldogs.

Quarterback and captain Jimmy Johnson was selected All-American by Walter Camp. "Camp based his selection on a remarkable game he witnessed when Carlisle played Harvard. Johnson was small but fiery, and was a leader."

== Schedule ==
Date	Time	Opponent	Site	Result	Attendance	Source
September 19		Lebanon Valley	Indian Field; Carlisle, PA	W 28–0		
September 26		Gettysburg	Indian Field; Carlisle, PA	W 46–0		
October 3		vs. Bucknell	Williamsport, PA	W 12–0		
October 10		at Franklin & Marshall	Lancaster, PA	W 30–0		
October 17		at Princeton	University Field; Princeton, NJ	L 11–0		
October 24		Swarthmore	Indian Field; Carlisle, PA	W 12–5		
October 31	3:00 p.m.	at Harvard	Soldiers' Field; Boston, MA	L 12–11	12,000	
November 7		at Georgetown	Georgetown Field; Washington, DC	W 28–6		
November 14		at Penn	Franklin Field; Philadelphia, PA	W 16–6		
November 21		vs. Virginia	Lafayette Field; Norfolk, VA	T 6–6	5,000	
November 26		vs. Northwestern	South Side Park; Chicago, IL	W 28–0	3,000	
December 19	3:00 p.m.	at Utah	Cummings Field; Salt Lake City, UT	W 22–0	1,000	
December 25		vs. Reliance Athletic Club	San Francisco, CA	W 23–0		
January 1		vs. Sherman	Prager Park; Los Angeles, CA	W 12–6		
