= 1903 Cornell Big Red football team =

American college football season

1903 Cornell Big Red football
- Conference: Independent
- Record: 6–3–1
- Head coach: Bill Warner (1st season)
- Captain: Sanford Hunt
- Home stadium: Percy Field

1903 Eastern college football independents records
	Conf.			Overall
Team	W	L	T	W		L		T
Princeton		–		11	–	0	–	0
Yale		–		11	–	1	–	0
Columbia		–		9	–	1	–	0
Dartmouth		–		9	–	1	–	0
Geneva		–		9	–	1	–	0
Holy Cross		–		8	–	2	–	0
Temple		–		4	–	1	–	0
Washington & Jefferson		–		8	–	2	–	0
Lehigh		–		9	–	2	–	1
Harvard		–		9	–	3	–	0
Penn		–		9	–	3	–	0
Army		–		6	–	2	–	1
Carlisle		–		6	–	2	–	1
Amherst		–		7	–	3	–	0
Lafayette		–		7	–	3	–	0
Cornell		–		6	–	3	–	1
Colgate		–		4	–	2	–	1
Penn State		–		5	–	3	–	0
Swarthmore		–		6	–	4	–	0
Dickinson		–		7	–	5	–	0
Brown		–		5	–	4	–	1
Syracuse		–		5	–	4	–	0
Fordham		–		1	–	1	–	0
Franklin & Marshall		–		5	–	5	–	1
Buffalo		–		4	–	4	–	0
Rutgers		–		4	–	4	–	1
Delaware		–		4	–	4	–	0
Villanova		–		2	–	2	–	0
Bucknell		–		4	–	5	–	0
Vermont		–		4	–	5	–	0
Tufts		–		5	–	8	–	0
Wesleyan		–		3	–	6	–	1
Springfield Training School		–		1	–	3	–	1
NYU		–		2	–	5	–	0
New Hampshire		–		2	–	6	–	1
Pittsburgh College		–		1	–	5	–	1
Western U. Penn.		–		1	–	8	–	1

The 1903 Cornell Big Red football team was an American football team that represented Cornell University during the 1903 college football season. In their first season under head coach Bill Warner, the Big Red compiled a 6–3–1 record and outscored all opponents by a combined total of 120 to 103. While the team shut out 7 of 10 opponents, it gave up 44 and 42 points in losses to Princeton and Penn, respectively.

== Schedule ==
Date	Opponent	Site	Result	Source
September 26	Hobart	Percy Field; Ithaca, NY	W 12–0	
September 30	Alfred	Percy Field; Ithaca, NY	W 26–0	
October 3	Rochester	Percy Field; Ithaca, NY	W 11–0	
October 10	Colgate	Percy Field; Ithaca, NY (rivalry)	W 12–0	
October 17	Bucknell	Percy Field; Ithaca, NY	W 6–0	
October 24	Western Reserve	Percy Field; Ithaca, NY	W 41–0	
October 31	at Princeton	University Field; Princeton, NJ	L 0–44	
November 7	Lehigh	Percy Field; Ithaca, NY	T 0–0	
November 14	Columbia	Percy Field; Ithaca, NY (rivalry)	L 12–17	
November 26	at Penn	Franklin Field; Philadelphia, PA (rivalry)	L 0–42	
