= 1903 Lehigh Brown and White football team =

American college football season

1903 Lehigh Brown and White football
- Conference: Independent
- Record: 9–2–1
- Head coach: Samuel B. Newton (2nd season)

1903 Eastern college football independents records
| | Conf. | | | Overall |
| Team | W | L | T | W | | L | | T |
|---|---|---|---|---|---|---|---|---|
| Princeton | | – | | 11 | – | 0 | – | 0 |
| Yale | | – | | 11 | – | 1 | – | 0 |
| Columbia | | – | | 9 | – | 1 | – | 0 |
| Dartmouth | | – | | 9 | – | 1 | – | 0 |
| Geneva | | – | | 9 | – | 1 | – | 0 |
| Holy Cross | | – | | 8 | – | 2 | – | 0 |
| Temple | | – | | 4 | – | 1 | – | 0 |
| Washington & Jefferson | | – | | 8 | – | 2 | – | 0 |
| Lehigh | | – | | 9 | – | 2 | – | 1 |
| Harvard | | – | | 9 | – | 3 | – | 0 |
| Penn | | – | | 9 | – | 3 | – | 0 |
| Army | | – | | 6 | – | 2 | – | 1 |
| Carlisle | | – | | 6 | – | 2 | – | 1 |
| Amherst | | – | | 7 | – | 3 | – | 0 |
| Lafayette | | – | | 7 | – | 3 | – | 0 |
| Cornell | | – | | 6 | – | 3 | – | 1 |
| Colgate | | – | | 4 | – | 2 | – | 1 |
| Penn State | | – | | 5 | – | 3 | – | 0 |
| Swarthmore | | – | | 6 | – | 4 | – | 0 |
| Dickinson | | – | | 7 | – | 5 | – | 0 |
| Brown | | – | | 5 | – | 4 | – | 1 |
| Syracuse | | – | | 5 | – | 4 | – | 0 |
| Fordham | | – | | 1 | – | 1 | – | 0 |
| Franklin & Marshall | | – | | 5 | – | 5 | – | 1 |
| Buffalo | | – | | 4 | – | 4 | – | 0 |
| Rutgers | | – | | 4 | – | 4 | – | 1 |
| Delaware | | – | | 4 | – | 4 | – | 0 |
| Villanova | | – | | 2 | – | 2 | – | 0 |
| Bucknell | | – | | 4 | – | 5 | – | 0 |
| Vermont | | – | | 4 | – | 5 | – | 0 |
| Tufts | | – | | 5 | – | 8 | – | 0 |
| Wesleyan | | – | | 3 | – | 6 | – | 1 |
| Springfield Training School | | – | | 1 | – | 3 | – | 1 |
| NYU | | – | | 2 | – | 5 | – | 0 |
| New Hampshire | | – | | 2 | – | 6 | – | 1 |
| Pittsburgh College | | – | | 1 | – | 5 | – | 1 |
| Western U. Penn. | | – | | 1 | – | 8 | – | 1 |

The 1903 Lehigh Brown and White football team was an American football team that represented Lehigh University as an independent during the 1903 college football season. In its second season under head coach Samuel B. Newton, the team compiled a 9–2–1 record and outscored opponents by a total of 331 to 45.

== Schedule ==
| Date | Opponent | Site | Result | Source |
|---|---|---|---|---|
| September 26 | Albright | Lehigh Field; Bethlehem, PA | W 83–0 | |
| September 30 | Manhattan College | Bethlehem, PA | W 40–0 | |
| October 3 | at Penn | Franklin Field; Philadelphia, PA | L 0–16 | |
| October 7 | at Swarthmore | Whittier Field; Swarthmore, PA | W 10–5 | |
| October 10 | Ursinus | Bethlehem, PA | W 41–0 | |
| October 14 | at Princeton | University Field; Princeton, NJ | L 0–12 | |
| October 24 | Villanova | Bethlehem, PA | W 71–0 | |
| October 31 | at Dickinson | Carlisle, PA | W 17–0 | |
| November 7 | at Cornell | Percy Field; Ithaca, NY | T 0–0 | |
| November 14 | Susquehanna | Bethlehem, PA | W 45–0 | |
| November 21 | Lafayette | Bethlehem, PA (rivalry) | W 12–6 | |
| November 26 | at Georgetown | Georgetown Field; Washington, DC | W 12–6 | |
