= 1903 Army Cadets football team =

American college football season

1903 Army Cadets football
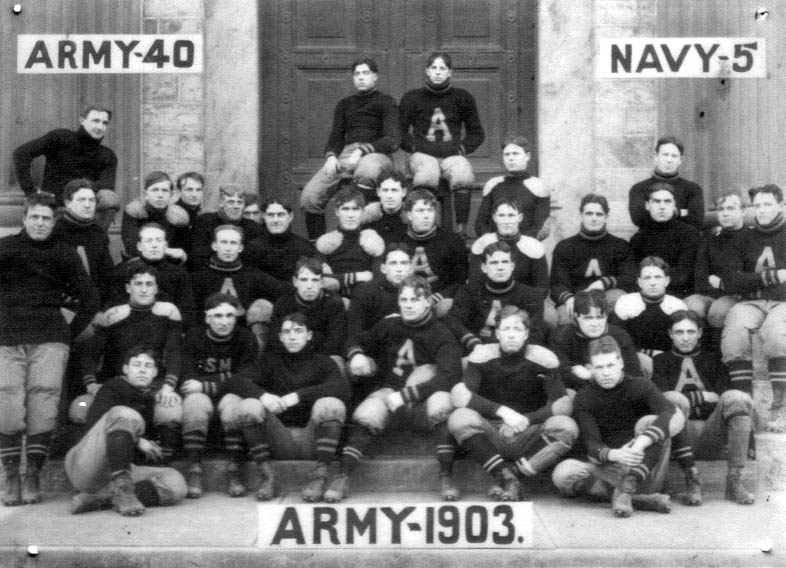
- Conference: Independent
- Record: 6–2–1
- Head coach: Edward Leonard King (1st season)
- Captain: Edward Farnsworth
- Home stadium: The Plain

1903 Eastern college football independents records
	Conf.			Overall
Team	W	L	T	W		L		T
Princeton		–		11	–	0	–	0
Yale		–		11	–	1	–	0
Columbia		–		9	–	1	–	0
Dartmouth		–		9	–	1	–	0
Geneva		–		9	–	1	–	0
Holy Cross		–		8	–	2	–	0
Temple		–		4	–	1	–	0
Washington & Jefferson		–		8	–	2	–	0
Lehigh		–		9	–	2	–	1
Harvard		–		9	–	3	–	0
Penn		–		9	–	3	–	0
Army		–		6	–	2	–	1
Carlisle		–		6	–	2	–	1
Amherst		–		7	–	3	–	0
Lafayette		–		7	–	3	–	0
Cornell		–		6	–	3	–	1
Colgate		–		4	–	2	–	1
Penn State		–		5	–	3	–	0
Swarthmore		–		6	–	4	–	0
Dickinson		–		7	–	5	–	0
Brown		–		5	–	4	–	1
Syracuse		–		5	–	4	–	0
Fordham		–		1	–	1	–	0
Franklin & Marshall		–		5	–	5	–	1
Buffalo		–		4	–	4	–	0
Rutgers		–		4	–	4	–	1
Delaware		–		4	–	4	–	0
Villanova		–		2	–	2	–	0
Bucknell		–		4	–	5	–	0
Vermont		–		4	–	5	–	0
Tufts		–		5	–	8	–	0
Wesleyan		–		3	–	6	–	1
Springfield Training School		–		1	–	3	–	1
NYU		–		2	–	5	–	0
New Hampshire		–		2	–	6	–	1
Pittsburgh College		–		1	–	5	–	1
Western U. Penn.		–		1	–	8	–	1

The 1903 Army Cadets football team represented the United States Military Academy as an independent during the 1903 college football season. In their first and only season under head coach Edward Leonard King, the Cadets compiled a 6–2–1 record, shut out five of their nine opponents (including a scoreless tie with Colgate), and outscored all opponents by a combined total of 164 to 33.

The team's two losses were to Harvard (5–0) and Yale (17–5). In an intersectional game, the Cadets defeated Chicago 10–6. In the annual Army–Navy Game, the Cadets, behind quarterback Horatio B. Hackett, defeated the Midshipmen 40–5.

Three members of the squad were honored by one or both of Walter Camp (WC) and Caspar Whitney (CW) on the All-America team. They are: guard Napoleon Riley (WC-2); halfback Edward Farnsworth (CW-2); and fullback Frederick Prince (CW-2).

== Schedule ==
Date	Opponent	Site	Result	Attendance	Source
September 26	Colgate	The Plain; West Point, NY	T 0–0		
October 3	Tufts	The Plain; West Point, NY	W 17–0		
October 10	Dickinson	The Plain; West Point, NY	W 12–0		
October 17	Harvard	The Plain; West Point, NY	L 0–5	8,000–30,000	
October 24	Yale	The Plain; West Point, NY	L 5–17		
October 31	Vermont	The Plain; West Point, NY	W 32–0		
November 7	Manhattan	The Plain; West Point, NY	W 48–0		
November 14	Chicago	The Plain; West Point, NY	W 10–6		
November 28	vs. Navy	Franklin Field; Philadelphia, PA (Army–Navy Game)	W 40–5		
