= 1903 Columbia Blue and White football team =

American college football season

1903 Columbia Blue and White football
- Conference: Independent
- Record: 9–1
- Head coach: Bill Morley (2nd season)
- Captain: Richard Shore Smith
- Home stadium: Polo Grounds

1903 Eastern college football independents records
	Conf.			Overall
Team	W	L	T	W		L		T
Princeton		–		11	–	0	–	0
Yale		–		11	–	1	–	0
Columbia		–		9	–	1	–	0
Dartmouth		–		9	–	1	–	0
Geneva		–		9	–	1	–	0
Holy Cross		–		8	–	2	–	0
Temple		–		4	–	1	–	0
Washington & Jefferson		–		8	–	2	–	0
Lehigh		–		9	–	2	–	1
Harvard		–		9	–	3	–	0
Penn		–		9	–	3	–	0
Army		–		6	–	2	–	1
Carlisle		–		6	–	2	–	1
Amherst		–		7	–	3	–	0
Lafayette		–		7	–	3	–	0
Cornell		–		6	–	3	–	1
Colgate		–		4	–	2	–	1
Penn State		–		5	–	3	–	0
Swarthmore		–		6	–	4	–	0
Dickinson		–		7	–	5	–	0
Brown		–		5	–	4	–	1
Syracuse		–		5	–	4	–	0
Fordham		–		1	–	1	–	0
Franklin & Marshall		–		5	–	5	–	1
Buffalo		–		4	–	4	–	0
Rutgers		–		4	–	4	–	1
Delaware		–		4	–	4	–	0
Villanova		–		2	–	2	–	0
Bucknell		–		4	–	5	–	0
Vermont		–		4	–	5	–	0
Tufts		–		5	–	8	–	0
Wesleyan		–		3	–	6	–	1
Springfield Training School		–		1	–	3	–	1
NYU		–		2	–	5	–	0
New Hampshire		–		2	–	6	–	1
Pittsburgh College		–		1	–	5	–	1
Western U. Penn.		–		1	–	8	–	1

The 1903 Columbia Blue and White football team was an American football team that represented Columbia University as an independent during the 1903 college football season. In its second season under head coach Bill Morley, the team compiled a 9–1 record, shut out its first seven opponents, and outscored all opponents by a total of 148 to 43.

Fullback Richard Shore Smith was the team captain. Smith and tackle Tom Thorp received first-team honors on the 1903 All-America team. W. E. Metzenthin also starred in the backfield for Columbia. The team's sole loss was to the 1903 Yale team that featured seven first-team All-Americans, including Foster Rockwell and Tom Shevlin.

Columbia's sports teams were commonly called the "Blue and White" in this era, but had no official nickname. The name "Lions" would not be adopted until 1910.

The team played its home games at the Polo Grounds in Upper Manhattan.

== Schedule ==
Date	Opponent	Site	Result	Attendance	Source
September 26	Wesleyan	Polo Grounds; New York, NY	W 10–0		
September 30	vs. Columbia alumni	Polo Grounds; New York, NY	W 16–0		
October 3	Union (NY)	Polo Grounds; New York, NY	W 36–0		
October 7	Hamilton	Polo Grounds; New York, NY	W 29–0		
October 10	Williams	Polo Grounds; New York, NY	W 5–0	2,000	
October 14	Swarthmore	Polo Grounds; New York, NY	W 5–0		
October 17	Amherst	Polo Grounds; New York, NY	W 12–0	4,000	
October 24	Penn	Polo Grounds; New York, NY	W 18–6	15,000	
October 31	Yale	Polo Grounds; New York, NY	L 0–25	32,000	
November 14	at Cornell	Percy Field; Ithaca, NY (rivalry)	W 17–12		
