= 1903 Pittsburgh College football team =

American college football season

1903 Pittsburgh College football
- Conference: Independent
- Record: 2–5
- Head coach: T. A. Giblin (1st season)

1903 Eastern college football independents records
	Conf.			Overall
Team	W	L	T	W		L		T
Princeton		–		11	–	0	–	0
Yale		–		11	–	1	–	0
Columbia		–		9	–	1	–	0
Dartmouth		–		9	–	1	–	0
Geneva		–		9	–	1	–	0
Holy Cross		–		8	–	2	–	0
Temple		–		4	–	1	–	0
Washington & Jefferson		–		8	–	2	–	0
Lehigh		–		9	–	2	–	1
Harvard		–		9	–	3	–	0
Penn		–		9	–	3	–	0
Army		–		6	–	2	–	1
Carlisle		–		6	–	2	–	1
Amherst		–		7	–	3	–	0
Lafayette		–		7	–	3	–	0
Cornell		–		6	–	3	–	1
Colgate		–		4	–	2	–	1
Penn State		–		5	–	3	–	0
Swarthmore		–		6	–	4	–	0
Dickinson		–		7	–	5	–	0
Brown		–		5	–	4	–	1
Syracuse		–		5	–	4	–	0
Fordham		–		1	–	1	–	0
Franklin & Marshall		–		5	–	5	–	1
Buffalo		–		4	–	4	–	0
Rutgers		–		4	–	4	–	1
Delaware		–		4	–	4	–	0
Villanova		–		2	–	2	–	0
Bucknell		–		4	–	5	–	0
Vermont		–		4	–	5	–	0
Tufts		–		5	–	8	–	0
Wesleyan		–		3	–	6	–	1
Springfield Training School		–		1	–	3	–	1
NYU		–		2	–	5	–	0
New Hampshire		–		2	–	6	–	1
Pittsburgh College		–		1	–	5	–	1
Western U. Penn.		–		1	–	8	–	1

The 1903 Pittsburgh College football team was an American football team that represented Pittsburgh Catholic College of the Holy Ghost—now known as Duquesne University—during the 1903 college football season. T. A. Giblin served in his first and only season as the team's head coach.

== Schedule ==
Date	Time	Opponent	Site	Result	Attendance	Source
October 10		at Allegheny Athletic Association	Coliseum; Allegheny, PA	W 6–0 (Note: Game ended with a disputed touchdown by Pittsburgh College. The Pittsburgh Gazette and Post said the game was awarded to the College, 6–0; the Press reported that the game ended scoreless. Duquesne University claims a win (with score "n/a") in its record book.)	300	
October 17		at Crafton	Crafton grounds; Crafton, PA	W 5–0 (Note: Game ended in dispute, with Crafton claiming a 0–0 tie.)		
October 20		at Western University of Pennsylvania (Note: The team that played W.U.P. on this day played under the name of "Manchester Athletic Club" but used players mainly from Pittsburgh College. Duquesne University counts the game as its own, while the University of Pittsburgh lists its opponent that day as Manchester A.C. and does not count the game toward its all-time record vs. Duquesne.)	Coliseum; Allegheny, PA	10–6		
October 31		at California Normal (PA)	Athletic Park; California, PA	L 0–41		
November 3		Pittsburgh Lyceum	College grounds (Note: Also called "Bluff field", from the campus and its field being situated on The Bluff.); Pittsburgh, PA	L 0–12		
November 7	3:30 p.m.	Pastimes AC	Pittsburgh, PA	L 0–21		
November 14		East End Lyceum	College grounds; Pittsburgh PA	L 2–16		
November 26		at Wheeling AC	State Fair ground; Wheeling, WV	L 0–19		
All times are in Eastern time
