= 1903 Rutgers Queensmen football team =

American college football season

1903 Rutgers Queensmen football
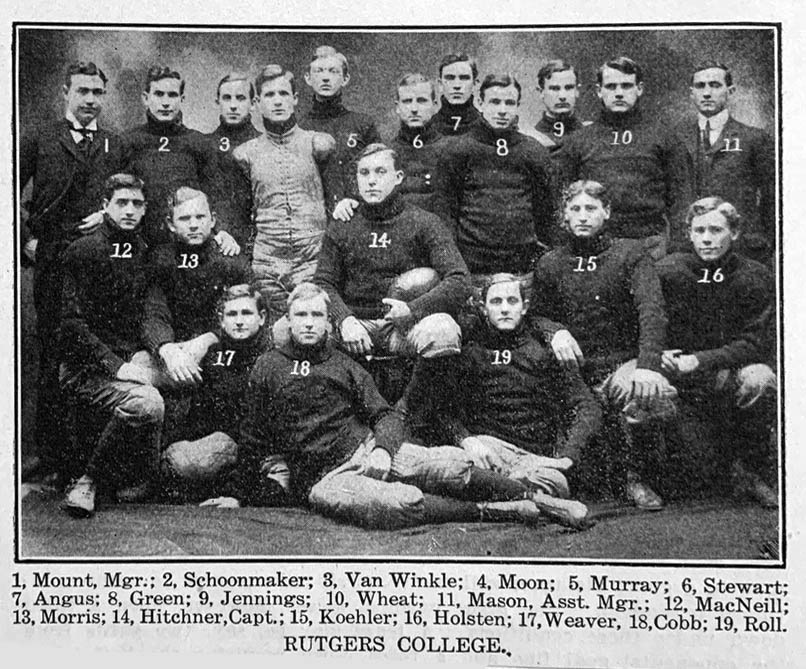
- Conference: Independent
- Record: 4–4–1
- Head coach: Oliver D. Mann (1st season)
- Captain: Alfred Ellet Hitchner
- Home stadium: Neilson Field

1903 Eastern college football independents records
	Conf.			Overall
Team	W	L	T	W		L		T
Princeton		–		11	–	0	–	0
Yale		–		11	–	1	–	0
Columbia		–		9	–	1	–	0
Dartmouth		–		9	–	1	–	0
Geneva		–		9	–	1	–	0
Holy Cross		–		8	–	2	–	0
Temple		–		4	–	1	–	0
Washington & Jefferson		–		8	–	2	–	0
Lehigh		–		9	–	2	–	1
Harvard		–		9	–	3	–	0
Penn		–		9	–	3	–	0
Army		–		6	–	2	–	1
Carlisle		–		6	–	2	–	1
Amherst		–		7	–	3	–	0
Lafayette		–		7	–	3	–	0
Cornell		–		6	–	3	–	1
Colgate		–		4	–	2	–	1
Penn State		–		5	–	3	–	0
Swarthmore		–		6	–	4	–	0
Dickinson		–		7	–	5	–	0
Brown		–		5	–	4	–	1
Syracuse		–		5	–	4	–	0
Fordham		–		1	–	1	–	0
Franklin & Marshall		–		5	–	5	–	1
Buffalo		–		4	–	4	–	0
Rutgers		–		4	–	4	–	1
Delaware		–		4	–	4	–	0
Villanova		–		2	–	2	–	0
Bucknell		–		4	–	5	–	0
Vermont		–		4	–	5	–	0
Tufts		–		5	–	8	–	0
Wesleyan		–		3	–	6	–	1
Springfield Training School		–		1	–	3	–	1
NYU		–		2	–	5	–	0
New Hampshire		–		2	–	6	–	1
Pittsburgh College		–		1	–	5	–	1
Western U. Penn.		–		1	–	8	–	1

The 1903 Rutgers Queensmen football team represented Rutgers University as an independent during the 1903 college football season. In their first season under head coach Oliver D. Mann, the Queensmen compiled a 4–4–1 record and were outscored by their opponents, 110 to 94. The team captain, for the second consecutive year, was Alfred Ellet Hitchner.

== Schedule ==
Date	Opponent	Site	Result	Source
October 3	at Fordham	Bronx, NY	L 0–15	
October 10	at Delaware	Front and Union Streets gridiron; Wilmington, DE	L 0–5	
October 14	Manhattan College	Neilson Field; New Brunswick, NJ	W 8–6	
October 17	at Ursinus	Collegeville, PA	L 0–40	
October 24	Haverford	Neilson Field; New Brunswick, NJ	L 6–18	
October 31	Stevens	Neilson Field; New Brunswick, NJ	W 36–6	
November 7	at Stevens	Cricket Grounds; Hoboken, NJ	W 26–5	
November 14	NYU	Neilson Field; New Brunswick, NJ	W 18-15	
November 21	Franklin & Marshall	Neilson Field; New Brunswick, NJ	T 0–0	
