= 1903 Brown Bears football team =

American college football season

1903 Brown Bears football
- Conference: Independent
- Record: 5–4–1
- Head coach: Dave Fultz (1st season)
- Captain: Archie R. Webb
- Home stadium: Andrews Field

1903 Eastern college football independents records
	Conf.			Overall
Team	W	L	T	W		L		T
Princeton		–		11	–	0	–	0
Yale		–		11	–	1	–	0
Columbia		–		9	–	1	–	0
Dartmouth		–		9	–	1	–	0
Geneva		–		9	–	1	–	0
Holy Cross		–		8	–	2	–	0
Temple		–		4	–	1	–	0
Washington & Jefferson		–		8	–	2	–	0
Lehigh		–		9	–	2	–	1
Harvard		–		9	–	3	–	0
Penn		–		9	–	3	–	0
Army		–		6	–	2	–	1
Carlisle		–		6	–	2	–	1
Amherst		–		7	–	3	–	0
Lafayette		–		7	–	3	–	0
Cornell		–		6	–	3	–	1
Colgate		–		4	–	2	–	1
Penn State		–		5	–	3	–	0
Swarthmore		–		6	–	4	–	0
Dickinson		–		7	–	5	–	0
Brown		–		5	–	4	–	1
Syracuse		–		5	–	4	–	0
Fordham		–		1	–	1	–	0
Franklin & Marshall		–		5	–	5	–	1
Buffalo		–		4	–	4	–	0
Rutgers		–		4	–	4	–	1
Delaware		–		4	–	4	–	0
Villanova		–		2	–	2	–	0
Bucknell		–		4	–	5	–	0
Vermont		–		4	–	5	–	0
Tufts		–		5	–	8	–	0
Wesleyan		–		3	–	6	–	1
Springfield Training School		–		1	–	3	–	1
NYU		–		2	–	5	–	0
New Hampshire		–		2	–	6	–	1
Pittsburgh College		–		1	–	5	–	1
Western U. Penn.		–		1	–	8	–	1

The 1903 Brown Bears football team represented Brown University as an independent during the 1903 college football season. Led by Dave Fultz in his first and only season as head coach, Brown compiled a record of 5–4–1. The team was led by first-year head coach Dave Fultz.

== Schedule ==
Date	Time	Opponent	Site	Result	Attendance	Source
September 26		Colby	Andrews Field; Providence, RI	W 23–0		
October 3		Wesleyan	Andrews Field; Providence, RI	W 11–0		
October 10		Princeton	Andrews Field; Providence, RI	L 0–29		
October 17		at Penn	Franklin Field; Philadelphia, PA	L 0–30		
October 24	3:00 p.m.	at Harvard	Soldiers' Field; Boston, MA	L 0–29	9,000	
October 31		Williams	Andrews Field; Providence, RI	W 22–0		
November 7		Vermont	Andrews Field; Providence, RI	W 24–0		
November 14		Syracuse	Andrews Field; Providence, RI	W 12–5		
November 18		Springfield Training School	Andrews Field; Providence, RI	T 6–6		
November 26		vs. Dartmouth	Varick Park; Manchester, NH	L 0–62		
