= 1903 Vermont Green and Gold football team =

American college football season

1903 Vermont Green and Gold football
- Conference: Independent
- Record: 4–5
- Head coach: Harry Howard Cloudman (2nd season)
- Home stadium: Athletic Park

1903 Eastern college football independents records
	Conf.			Overall
Team	W	L	T	W		L		T
Princeton		–		11	–	0	–	0
Yale		–		11	–	1	–	0
Columbia		–		9	–	1	–	0
Dartmouth		–		9	–	1	–	0
Geneva		–		9	–	1	–	0
Holy Cross		–		8	–	2	–	0
Temple		–		4	–	1	–	0
Washington & Jefferson		–		8	–	2	–	0
Lehigh		–		9	–	2	–	1
Harvard		–		9	–	3	–	0
Penn		–		9	–	3	–	0
Army		–		6	–	2	–	1
Carlisle		–		6	–	2	–	1
Amherst		–		7	–	3	–	0
Lafayette		–		7	–	3	–	0
Cornell		–		6	–	3	–	1
Colgate		–		4	–	2	–	1
Penn State		–		5	–	3	–	0
Swarthmore		–		6	–	4	–	0
Dickinson		–		7	–	5	–	0
Brown		–		5	–	4	–	1
Syracuse		–		5	–	4	–	0
Fordham		–		1	–	1	–	0
Franklin & Marshall		–		5	–	5	–	1
Buffalo		–		4	–	4	–	0
Rutgers		–		4	–	4	–	1
Delaware		–		4	–	4	–	0
Villanova		–		2	–	2	–	0
Bucknell		–		4	–	5	–	0
Vermont		–		4	–	5	–	0
Tufts		–		5	–	8	–	0
Wesleyan		–		3	–	6	–	1
Springfield Training School		–		1	–	3	–	1
NYU		–		2	–	5	–	0
New Hampshire		–		2	–	6	–	1
Pittsburgh College		–		1	–	5	–	1
Western U. Penn.		–		1	–	8	–	1

The 1903 Vermont Green and Gold football team was an American football team that represented the University of Vermont as an independent during the 1903 college football season. In their second year under head coach Harry Howard Cloudman, the team compiled a 4–5 record.

== Schedule ==
Date	Opponent	Site	Result	Source
September 28	Montpelier Seminary	Athletic Park; Burlington, VT	W 27–0	
October 3	at Yale	Yale Field; New Haven, CT	L 0–46	
October 7	Dartmouth	Athletic Park; Burlington, VT	L 0–36	
October 17	at St. Lawrence	Canton, NY	W 21–0	
October 25	Massachusetts	Athletic Park; Burlington, VT	L 0–5	
October 31	at Army	The Plain; West Point, NY	L 0–32	
November 7	at Brown	Andrews Field; Providence, RI	L 0–24	
November 14	St. Lawrence	Athletic Park; Burlington, VT	W 48–11	
November 21	at RPI	Troy, NY	W 45–0	
