= 1903 Swarthmore Quakers football team =

American college football season

1903 Swarthmore Quakers football
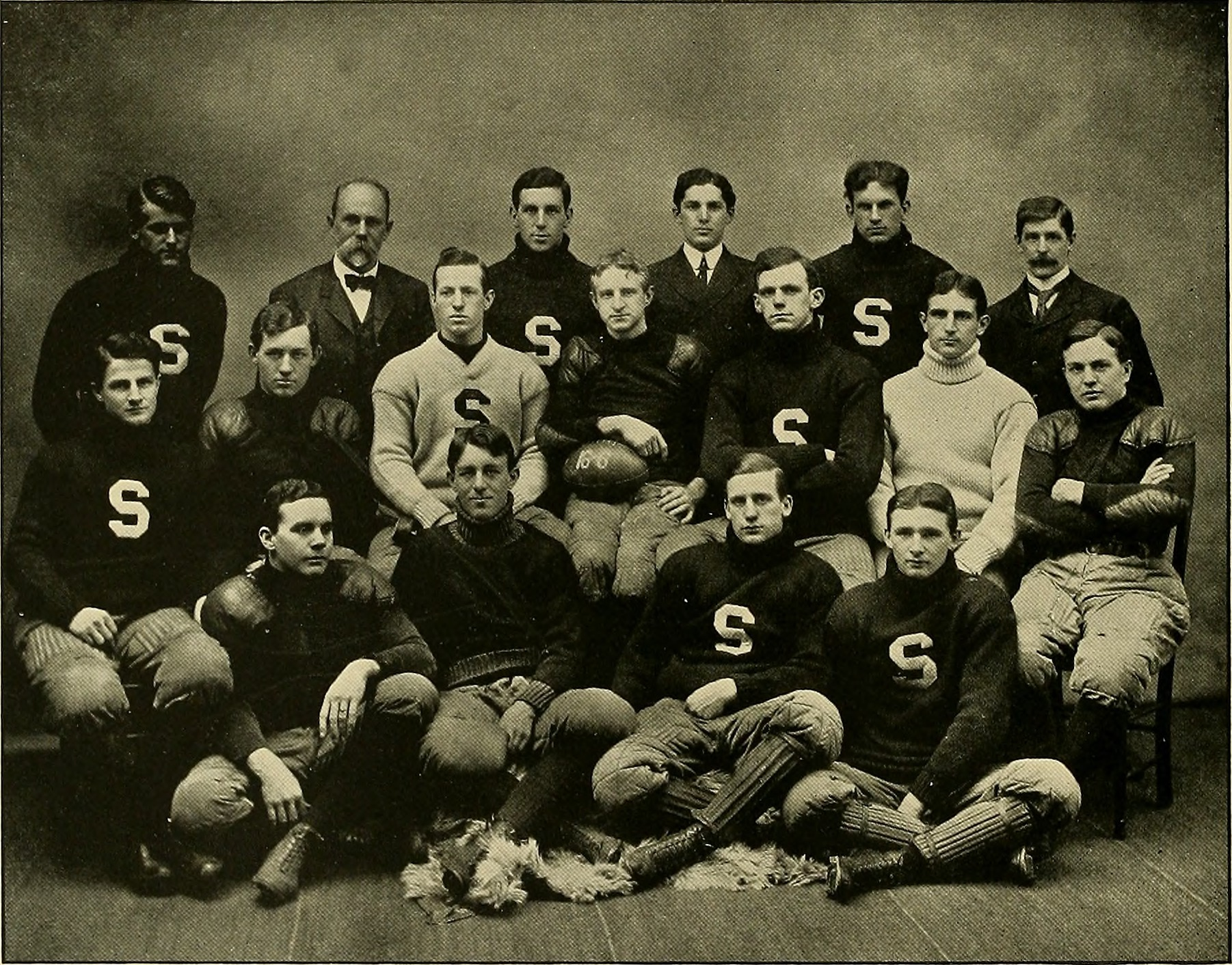
- Conference: Independent
- Record: 6–4
- Head coach: George H. Brooke (5th season)
- Home stadium: Whittier Field

1903 Eastern college football independents records
	Conf.			Overall
Team	W	L	T	W		L		T
Princeton		–		11	–	0	–	0
Yale		–		11	–	1	–	0
Columbia		–		9	–	1	–	0
Dartmouth		–		9	–	1	–	0
Geneva		–		9	–	1	–	0
Holy Cross		–		8	–	2	–	0
Temple		–		4	–	1	–	0
Washington & Jefferson		–		8	–	2	–	0
Lehigh		–		9	–	2	–	1
Harvard		–		9	–	3	–	0
Penn		–		9	–	3	–	0
Army		–		6	–	2	–	1
Carlisle		–		6	–	2	–	1
Amherst		–		7	–	3	–	0
Lafayette		–		7	–	3	–	0
Cornell		–		6	–	3	–	1
Colgate		–		4	–	2	–	1
Penn State		–		5	–	3	–	0
Swarthmore		–		6	–	4	–	0
Dickinson		–		7	–	5	–	0
Brown		–		5	–	4	–	1
Syracuse		–		5	–	4	–	0
Fordham		–		1	–	1	–	0
Franklin & Marshall		–		5	–	5	–	1
Buffalo		–		4	–	4	–	0
Rutgers		–		4	–	4	–	1
Delaware		–		4	–	4	–	0
Villanova		–		2	–	2	–	0
Bucknell		–		4	–	5	–	0
Vermont		–		4	–	5	–	0
Tufts		–		5	–	8	–	0
Wesleyan		–		3	–	6	–	1
Springfield Training School		–		1	–	3	–	1
NYU		–		2	–	5	–	0
New Hampshire		–		2	–	6	–	1
Pittsburgh College		–		1	–	5	–	1
Western U. Penn.		–		1	–	8	–	1

The 1903 Swarthmore Quakers football team was an American football team that represented Swarthmore College as an independent during the 1903 college football season. The team compiled a 6–4 record and outscored opponents by a total of 99 to 67. George H. Brooke was the head coach.

== Schedule ==
Date	Opponent	Site	Result	Source
September 30	at Princeton	Princeton, NJ	L 0–34	
October 3	Baltimore Medical	Whittier Field; Swarthmore, PA	W 12–0	
October 7	Lehigh	Whittier Field; Swarthmore, PA	L 5–10	
October 10	at St. John's (MD)	Annapolis, MD	W 6–0	
October 14	at Columbia	Polo Grounds; New York, NY	L 0–5	
October 17	Delaware	Whittier Field; Swarthmore, PA	W 11–0	
October 24	at Carlisle	Carlisle, PA	L 5–12	
October 31	Franklin & Marshall	Whittier Field; Swarthmore, PA	W 17–0	
November 6	Ursinus	Whittier Field; Swarthmore, PA	W 27–0	
November 21	at Haverford	Haverford, PA (rivalry)	W 16–6	
