= 1903 Dartmouth football team =

American college football season

1903 Dartmouth football
- Conference: Independent
- Record: 9–1
- Head coach: Fred Folsom (1st season)
- Captain: Myron E. Witham

1903 Eastern college football independents records
	Conf.			Overall
Team	W	L	T	W		L		T
Princeton		–		11	–	0	–	0
Yale		–		11	–	1	–	0
Columbia		–		9	–	1	–	0
Dartmouth		–		9	–	1	–	0
Geneva		–		9	–	1	–	0
Holy Cross		–		8	–	2	–	0
Temple		–		4	–	1	–	0
Washington & Jefferson		–		8	–	2	–	0
Lehigh		–		9	–	2	–	1
Harvard		–		9	–	3	–	0
Penn		–		9	–	3	–	0
Army		–		6	–	2	–	1
Carlisle		–		6	–	2	–	1
Amherst		–		7	–	3	–	0
Lafayette		–		7	–	3	–	0
Cornell		–		6	–	3	–	1
Colgate		–		4	–	2	–	1
Penn State		–		5	–	3	–	0
Swarthmore		–		6	–	4	–	0
Dickinson		–		7	–	5	–	0
Brown		–		5	–	4	–	1
Syracuse		–		5	–	4	–	0
Fordham		–		1	–	1	–	0
Franklin & Marshall		–		5	–	5	–	1
Buffalo		–		4	–	4	–	0
Rutgers		–		4	–	4	–	1
Delaware		–		4	–	4	–	0
Villanova		–		2	–	2	–	0
Bucknell		–		4	–	5	–	0
Vermont		–		4	–	5	–	0
Tufts		–		5	–	8	–	0
Wesleyan		–		3	–	6	–	1
Springfield Training School		–		1	–	3	–	1
NYU		–		2	–	5	–	0
New Hampshire		–		2	–	6	–	1
Pittsburgh College		–		1	–	5	–	1
Western U. Penn.		–		1	–	8	–	1

The 1903 Dartmouth football team was an American football team that represented Dartmouth College as an independent during the 1903 college football season. In its first season under head coach Fred Folsom, the team compiled a 9–1 record, shut out eight of ten opponents, and outscored all opponents by a total of 242 to 23. Myron E. Witham was the team captain. The team played its home games at Alumni Oval in Hanover, New Hampshire.

== Schedule ==
Date	Time	Opponent	Site	Result	Attendance	Source
September 30		Massachusetts	Alumni Oval; Hanover, NH	W 12–0		
October 3		Holy Cross	Alumni Oval; Hanover, NH	W 18–0		
October 10		at Vermont	Athletic Park; Burlington, VT	W 36–0		
October 14		Union (NY)	Alumni Oval; Hanover, NH	W 34–0		
October 17		at Williams	Weston Field; Williamstown, MA	W 17–0		
October 24		at Princeton	University Field; Princeton, NJ	L 0–17		
October 31		Wesleyan	Alumni Oval; Hanover, NH	W 34–6		
November 7		at Amherst	Pratt Field; Amherst, MA	W 18–0		
November 14	3:00 p.m.	at Harvard	Harvard Stadium; Boston, MA (rivalry)	W 11–0	15,000	
November 21		vs. Brown	Varick Park; Manchester, NH	W 62–0		
