= 1903 Geneva Covenanters football team =

American college football season

1903 Geneva Covenanters football
- Conference: Independent
- Record: 9–1
- Head coach: Samuel G. Craig (4th season)
- Captain: Paul Critchlow

1903 Eastern college football independents records
	Conf.			Overall
Team	W	L	T	W		L		T
Princeton		–		11	–	0	–	0
Yale		–		11	–	1	–	0
Columbia		–		9	–	1	–	0
Dartmouth		–		9	–	1	–	0
Geneva		–		9	–	1	–	0
Holy Cross		–		8	–	2	–	0
Temple		–		4	–	1	–	0
Washington & Jefferson		–		8	–	2	–	0
Lehigh		–		9	–	2	–	1
Harvard		–		9	–	3	–	0
Penn		–		9	–	3	–	0
Army		–		6	–	2	–	1
Carlisle		–		6	–	2	–	1
Amherst		–		7	–	3	–	0
Lafayette		–		7	–	3	–	0
Cornell		–		6	–	3	–	1
Colgate		–		4	–	2	–	1
Penn State		–		5	–	3	–	0
Swarthmore		–		6	–	4	–	0
Dickinson		–		7	–	5	–	0
Brown		–		5	–	4	–	1
Syracuse		–		5	–	4	–	0
Fordham		–		1	–	1	–	0
Franklin & Marshall		–		5	–	5	–	1
Buffalo		–		4	–	4	–	0
Rutgers		–		4	–	4	–	1
Delaware		–		4	–	4	–	0
Villanova		–		2	–	2	–	0
Bucknell		–		4	–	5	–	0
Vermont		–		4	–	5	–	0
Tufts		–		5	–	8	–	0
Wesleyan		–		3	–	6	–	1
Springfield Training School		–		1	–	3	–	1
NYU		–		2	–	5	–	0
New Hampshire		–		2	–	6	–	1
Pittsburgh College		–		1	–	5	–	1
Western U. Penn.		–		1	–	8	–	1

The 1903 Geneva Covenanters football team was an American football team that represented Geneva College as an independent during the 1903 college football season. Led by Samuel G. Craig in his fourth and final year as head coach, the team compiled a record of 9–1.

== Schedule ==
Date	Opponent	Site	Result	Attendance	Source
September 19	Alumni	Beaver Falls, PA	W 10–0		
October 3	Mount Union	Beaver Falls, PA	W 63–0	500	
October 10	Western University of Pennsylvania	Beaver Falls, PA	W 57–0	1,500	
October 17	Westminster (PA)	Beaver Falls, PA	W 35–0		
October 21	at Grove City	Grove City, PA	W 35–0		
October 24	Allegheny	Beaver Falls, PA	W 32–0	800	
October 31	at Western University of Pennsylvania	Colosseum; Pittsburgh, PA	W 32–0		
November 7	at Westminster (PA)	New Wilmington, PA	W 18–0		
November 14	at Washington & Jefferson	College Park; Washington, PA	L 0–6	3,000	
November 19	at Allegheny	Meadville, PA	W 5–0		
