= 1903 NYU Violets football team =

American college football season

1903 NYU Violets football
- Conference: Independent
- Record: 2–5
- Head coach: Robert P. Wilson (1st season)
- Home stadium: Ohio Field

1903 Eastern college football independents records
	Conf.			Overall
Team	W	L	T	W		L		T
Princeton		–		11	–	0	–	0
Yale		–		11	–	1	–	0
Columbia		–		9	–	1	–	0
Dartmouth		–		9	–	1	–	0
Geneva		–		9	–	1	–	0
Holy Cross		–		8	–	2	–	0
Temple		–		4	–	1	–	0
Washington & Jefferson		–		8	–	2	–	0
Lehigh		–		9	–	2	–	1
Harvard		–		9	–	3	–	0
Penn		–		9	–	3	–	0
Army		–		6	–	2	–	1
Carlisle		–		6	–	2	–	1
Amherst		–		7	–	3	–	0
Lafayette		–		7	–	3	–	0
Cornell		–		6	–	3	–	1
Colgate		–		4	–	2	–	1
Penn State		–		5	–	3	–	0
Swarthmore		–		6	–	4	–	0
Dickinson		–		7	–	5	–	0
Brown		–		5	–	4	–	1
Syracuse		–		5	–	4	–	0
Fordham		–		1	–	1	–	0
Franklin & Marshall		–		5	–	5	–	1
Buffalo		–		4	–	4	–	0
Rutgers		–		4	–	4	–	1
Delaware		–		4	–	4	–	0
Villanova		–		2	–	2	–	0
Bucknell		–		4	–	5	–	0
Vermont		–		4	–	5	–	0
Tufts		–		5	–	8	–	0
Wesleyan		–		3	–	6	–	1
Springfield Training School		–		1	–	3	–	1
NYU		–		2	–	5	–	0
New Hampshire		–		2	–	6	–	1
Pittsburgh College		–		1	–	5	–	1
Western U. Penn.		–		1	–	8	–	1

The 1903 NYU Violets football team was an American football team that represented New York University as an independent during the 1903 college football season. In their only year under head coach Robert P. Wilson, the team compiled a 2–5 record.

== Schedule ==
Date	Opponent	Site	Result	Source
October 10	Trinity (CT)	Ohio Field; Bronx, NY	W 35–5	
October 17	Stevens	Ohio Field; Bronx, NY	W 41–0	
October 24	at Wesleyan	Andrus Field; Middletown, CT	L 0–6	
October 31	Lafayette	Ohio Field; Bronx, NY	L 6–8	
November 7	at Haverford	Haverford, PA	L 0–6	
November 14	at Rutgers	Neilson Field; New Brunswick, NJ	L 15–18	
November 21	Union (NY)	Ohio Field; Bronx, NY	L 0–11	
