= 1903 Syracuse Orangemen football team =

American college football season

1903 Syracuse Orangemen football
- Conference: Independent
- Record: 5–4
- Head coach: Ancil D. Brown & Jason B. Parrish (1st season)
- Captain: Frank H. O'Neill
- Home stadium: Old Oval

1903 Eastern college football independents records
	Conf.			Overall
Team	W	L	T	W		L		T
Princeton		–		11	–	0	–	0
Yale		–		11	–	1	–	0
Columbia		–		9	–	1	–	0
Dartmouth		–		9	–	1	–	0
Geneva		–		9	–	1	–	0
Holy Cross		–		8	–	2	–	0
Temple		–		4	–	1	–	0
Washington & Jefferson		–		8	–	2	–	0
Lehigh		–		9	–	2	–	1
Harvard		–		9	–	3	–	0
Penn		–		9	–	3	–	0
Army		–		6	–	2	–	1
Carlisle		–		6	–	2	–	1
Amherst		–		7	–	3	–	0
Lafayette		–		7	–	3	–	0
Cornell		–		6	–	3	–	1
Colgate		–		4	–	2	–	1
Penn State		–		5	–	3	–	0
Swarthmore		–		6	–	4	–	0
Dickinson		–		7	–	5	–	0
Brown		–		5	–	4	–	1
Syracuse		–		5	–	4	–	0
Fordham		–		1	–	1	–	0
Franklin & Marshall		–		5	–	5	–	1
Buffalo		–		4	–	4	–	0
Rutgers		–		4	–	4	–	1
Delaware		–		4	–	4	–	0
Villanova		–		2	–	2	–	0
Bucknell		–		4	–	5	–	0
Vermont		–		4	–	5	–	0
Tufts		–		5	–	8	–	0
Wesleyan		–		3	–	6	–	1
Springfield Training School		–		1	–	3	–	1
NYU		–		2	–	5	–	0
New Hampshire		–		2	–	6	–	1
Pittsburgh College		–		1	–	5	–	1
Western U. Penn.		–		1	–	8	–	1

The 1903 Syracuse Orangemen football team represented Syracuse University as an independent during the 1903 college football season.

== Schedule ==
Date	Opponent	Site	Result	Attendance	Source
September 19	Cortland	Syracuse, NY	W 23–0	2,000	
September 26	Onondaga Indians	Syracuse, NY	W 35–0		
October 3	Clarkson	Syracuse, NY	W 34–0		
October 10	RPI	Syracuse, NY	W 33–0		
October 17	Colgate	Syracuse, NY (rivalry)	L 5–10	3,000	
October 24	Williams	Syracuse, NY	L 5–17	2,500	
October 31	Niagara	Syracuse, NY	W 47–0		
November 7	at Yale	Yale Field; New Haven, CT	L 0–30	5,000	
November 14	Brown	Andrews Field; Providence, RI	L 5–12	3,800	
