= 1903 Western University of Pennsylvania football team =

American college football season

1903 Western University of Pennsylvania football
- Conference: Independent
- Record: 1–8–1
- Head coach: Arthur Mosse (1st season)
- Home stadium: Colosseum

1903 Eastern college football independents records
	Conf.			Overall
Team	W	L	T	W		L		T
Princeton		–		11	–	0	–	0
Yale		–		11	–	1	–	0
Columbia		–		9	–	1	–	0
Dartmouth		–		9	–	1	–	0
Geneva		–		9	–	1	–	0
Holy Cross		–		8	–	2	–	0
Temple		–		4	–	1	–	0
Washington & Jefferson		–		8	–	2	–	0
Lehigh		–		9	–	2	–	1
Harvard		–		9	–	3	–	0
Penn		–		9	–	3	–	0
Army		–		6	–	2	–	1
Carlisle		–		6	–	2	–	1
Amherst		–		7	–	3	–	0
Lafayette		–		7	–	3	–	0
Cornell		–		6	–	3	–	1
Colgate		–		4	–	2	–	1
Penn State		–		5	–	3	–	0
Swarthmore		–		6	–	4	–	0
Dickinson		–		7	–	5	–	0
Brown		–		5	–	4	–	1
Syracuse		–		5	–	4	–	0
Fordham		–		1	–	1	–	0
Franklin & Marshall		–		5	–	5	–	1
Buffalo		–		4	–	4	–	0
Rutgers		–		4	–	4	–	1
Delaware		–		4	–	4	–	0
Villanova		–		2	–	2	–	0
Bucknell		–		4	–	5	–	0
Vermont		–		4	–	5	–	0
Tufts		–		5	–	8	–	0
Wesleyan		–		3	–	6	–	1
Springfield Training School		–		1	–	3	–	1
NYU		–		2	–	5	–	0
New Hampshire		–		2	–	6	–	1
Pittsburgh College		–		1	–	5	–	1
Western U. Penn.		–		1	–	8	–	1

The 1903 Western University of Pennsylvania football team was an American football team that represented Western University of Pennsylvania (now known as the University of Pittsburgh), as an independent during the 1903 college football season.

== Schedule ==
Date	Opponent	Site	Result	Attendance	Source
October 3	at West Virginia	Athletic Field; Morgantown, WV	L 6–24		
October 5	at West Virginia Conference Seminary	Buckhannon, WV	W 5–0		
October 10	at Geneva	Beaver Falls, PA	L 0–57	1,500	
October 17	Grove City	Colosseum; Pittsburgh, PA	cancelled		
October 20	Manchester AC	Colosseum; Pittsburgh, PA	L 6–10		
October 21	Bellevue Outing Club	University Grounds; Pittsburgh, PA	L 2–6		
October 24	Penn State	Colosseum; Pittsburgh, PA	L 0–59	600	
October 31	Geneva	Colosseum; Pittsburgh, PA	L 0–32		
November 3	Bucknell	Colosseum; Pittsburgh, PA	cancelled		
November 3	East End A.A.	Friendship Park; Pittsburgh, PA	L 0–28		
November 7	at Grove City	Grove City, PA	T 0–0		
November 14	at Marietta	Marietta, OH	L 6–45		
November 21	at Westminster (PA)	New Wilmington, PA	cancelled		

== Season recap ==
1903 was a pivotal year for sports at the Western University of Pennsylvania. The hockey team was not sanctioned in 1902 and did not attempt to form a team for the 1902–1903 season. Basketball was played intramurally rather than intercollegiately. The baseball season was cancelled after a few games due to eligibility questions surrounding several players. Consequently, the prospects for a successful football season were dim. In late September Fred Crolius, the 1902 football coach, who was put in charge of the Western University's athletics, hired Arthur “Texas” Mosse from Warrensburg Teachers College in Warrensburg, Missouri as permanent physical instructor (i.e. football coach and other duties as assigned). Coach Mosse played college ball at Kansas and had coached the Warrensburg Teachers College team two years to a record of 11–4. The man knew his football but the 1903 season had too many obstacles to overcome. The entire team never practiced at one time. Certain days the Medical students would practice. Other days the Collegiates and the Law students would attend. The faculty did not make things easy for the students to attend practice. The student body gave little support to the team that did show up and play the games. Attendance was so bad that the administration ceded the home field for the final two games to the visitors so they would not have to pay rent for the stadium grounds. The final record was 1-8-1 and WUP had been outscored 262–25. The November Courant criticized the university's lack of investment into a sports program befitting a school the size of WUP. A training table for the athletes and class schedules that allowed practice time were strongly suggested. On December 7 at a meeting of the Athletic Association Coach Mosse agreed to coach the 1904 team. The Association promised two thousand dollars specifically to get the football program up to speed. They suggested a five dollar rise in tuition to go directly to the Athletic Association to be used for football only until it was making money. Then the remaining sports would get some funding. The Alumni Association met on December 16 and presented the plan to the students of the engineering and collegiate departments. The response was overwhelming and the prospects for a total sports program were in place. Exposition Park was secured for all the 1904 home football games. The football fortunes of the Western University of Pennsylvania were finally going to be noticed nationwide. But the WUPs would first have to endure a horrible 1903 football season. In its first season under head coach Arthur Mosse, the team compiled a 1–8–1 record and was outscored by a total of 262 to 25.

== Game summaries ==
=== At West Virginia ===
On October 3 the WUP eleven traveled to Morgantown, West Virginia for the Backyard Brawl. The Mountaineers were deep in WUP territory on their first possession when Charles Castro fumbled. WUP halfback Illtid Page recovered and raced the length of the field for a touchdown. Carpenter kicked the goal after and the WUPs led 6–0. The Mountaineers dominated the remainder of the game. Charles Castro and Paul Martin each scored two touchdowns to lead West Virginia to a 24–6 victory. The WUP lineup for the game against West Virginia was Huntermark (right guard), Curt Leidenroth (right tackle), Charles Ertzman (right end), Thomas Crea (center), Martin (left guard), Miller (left tackle), Palmer (left end), Carpenter (quarterback), Edwards (right halfback), Illtid Page (left halfback) and Jackson (fullback). The game consisted of one twenty-five minute half and one twenty minute half. West Virginia finished the season with a 7–1 record under head coach Harry E. Trout.

=== At West Virginia Conference Seminary ===
On their return trip to Pittsburgh, the WUP eleven stopped in Buckhannon, West Virginia to play the West Virginia Conference Seminary team. Edward Trax scored the lone touchdown of the game to secure the Western University's only win of the season by a score of 5–0.

=== At Geneva ===
On October 10 with six new starters in the lineup, Coach Mosse and the WUP contingent arrived in Beaver Falls, Pa. to take on the Geneva College football juggernaut . More than fifteen hundred boisterous Geneva rooters were not disappointed. The WUP eleven made two first downs. The Covenanters scored ten touchdowns. Joe Thompson scored six. With the score 57–0, both teams agreed to stop the carnage after only twelve minutes into the second half. The WUP lineup for the game against Geneva was Byron Stroud (left end), Miller (left tackle), Reed (left guard), Michael Dinger (center), Ray Alexander (right guard), Curt Leidenroth (right tackle), Charles Gans (right end), Carpenter (quarterback), Illtid Page (left halfback), John Edwards (right halfback) and Edward Trax (fullback). During the game Edward Ord replaced Reed at left guard. The game consisted of one twenty-five minute half and one twelve minute half.

=== Grove City ===
Heavy rains flooded the Colosseum grounds on October 17 and Coach Mosse was forced to cancel the home opener with Grove City College.

=== Manchester Athletic Club ===
Manchester AC at WUP

Team	1	2	Total
• Manchester AC	10	0	10
WUP	0	6	6

- Date: October 20, 1903
- Location: Colosseum (Recreation Park)
  Pittsburgh, PA
- Referee: Clarke

Since the Grove City game was cancelled, the WUP set up a practice game with the Manchester Athletic Club for October 20. Coach Mosse substituted freely and tried new plays. WUP fullback Curt Liedenroth fumbled twice which led to two first half Manchester touchdowns. Manchester fullback Elson recovered the first fumble and plunged into the end zone on the next play for the first score. He missed the goal kick. A few plays later end L. Broderick picked up Leidenroth's second miscue and dashed forty yards for the second Manchester touchdown. Elson converted the goal after and Manchester led 10–0. The WUP offense finally scored on a fifteen-yard dash by John Edwards early in the second half. The final score was 10–6 in favor of Manchester A.C. Incidentally, for some unknown reason, the Western University did not want to play a game versus Pittsburgh College (Duquesne University). Pittsburgh College heard the rumor and stocked the Manchester roster with their players. Duquesne lists this game in their record book. The WUP lineup for the game against Manchester A. C. was Byron Stroud (left end), Theo Starzynski (left tackle), Edward Ord (left guard), Thomas Crea (center), Robert Hinchman (right guard), Reed (right tackle), John Edwards (right end), Carpenter (quarterback), Illtid Page (left halfback), Porter Wall (right halfback) and Edward Trax (fullback). Substitutions during the game were: George Glass replaced John Edwards at right end; John Biggert replaced George Glass at right end; John Edwards replaced Porter Wall at right halfback; and Curt Leidenroth replaced Edward Trax at fullback. The game consisted of twenty-five minute halves.

=== Bellevue Outing Club ===
Bellevue O.C. at WUP

Team	1	2	Total
• Bellevue O.C.	0	6	6
WUP	2	0	2

- Date: October 21, 1903
- Location: Colosseum (Recreation Park)
  Pittsburgh, PA

On October 21 another tuneup prior to the State College game was played against the Bellevue Outing Club. Bellevue was the Champion of the Western Pennsylvania 100 pound class. In the first half, the WUP offense moved the ball to the Bellevue five-yard line and turned the ball over on downs. On the next play the defense tackled quarterback Shaw of Bellevue in the end zone for a safety. WUP led 2–0 at halftime. Shaw made amends as he ran the second half kickoff back for a touchdown. Shaw's goal kick after was successful and Bellevue won the game 6–2. The WUP lineup for the game against Bellevue was Byron Stroud (left end), Theo Starzynski (left tackle), Edward Ord (left guard), Thomas Crea (center), Robert Hinchman (right guard), Reed (right tackle), John Edwards (right end), Carpenter (quarterback), Illtid Page (left halfback), Porter Wall (right halfback) and Edward Trax (fullback).

=== Penn State ===
Penn State at WUP

Team	1	2	Total
• Penn State	24	35	59
WUP	0	0	0

- Date: October 24, 1903
- Location: Colosseum (Recreation Park)
  Pittsburgh, PA
- Referee: Hockenberry (Syracuse University)

The two practice games were to no avail as the State College football team came to the Colosseum and annihilated Coach Mosse's team. Since the State College lineup had three “professionals”, Coach Mosse inserted himself into the lineup. Ironically, his fumble led to the first State touchdown by Carl Forkum. State College would score nine more touchdowns in the game. Carl Forkum scored four plus nine extra points, Irv Thompson scored three, Irish McIlveen scored two and Smith added one to make the final score 59–0. WUP lost to State College for the sixth straight time and was outscored 173–4 in the series. The WUP lineup for the game against Penn State was Byron Stroud (left end), Starr (left tackle), Thomas Aye (left guard), Michael Dinger (center), Andrew Cloak (right guard), Miller (right tackle), Clyde McGogney (right end), Carpenter (quarterback), Arthur Mosse (left halfback), John Edwards (right halfback) and Curt Leidenroth (fullback). Substitutions during the game were: Hinchman replaced Miller at right tackle; Illtid Page replaced John Edwards at right halfback; Edward Trax replaced Curt Leidenroth at fullback; and John Biggert replaced Edward Trax. The game consisted of twenty minute halves. Penn State finished the season with a 5–3 record under head coach Daniel A. Reed.

=== Geneva ===
Geneva at WUP

Team	1	2	Total
• Geneva	12	20	32
WUP	0	0	0

- Date: October 31, 1903
- Location: Colosseum (Recreation Park)
  Pittsburgh, PA
- Referee: Mr. Gans (W.U.P.)

On October 31, the undefeated and unscored upon Geneva Covenanters arrived at the Colosseum to play the rematch with the WUP eleven. Geneva had no trouble keeping their record intact as they scored five touchdowns. Their staunch defense kept the WUP backs out of the end zone and the final score read 32–0. Joe Thompson and Jud Schmidt each scored two touchdowns for the visitors. The WUP lineup for the game against Geneva was Byron Stroud (left end), Starr (left tackle), Robert Hinchman (left guard), Michael Dinger (center), Huntermark (right guard), Curt Leidenroth (right tackle), George Glass (right end), Shaeffer (quarterback), John Biggert (left halfback), Porter Wall (right halfback) and Edward Trax (fullback). The game consisted of twenty minute halves.

=== Bucknell ===
The game scheduled against Bucknell University on November 3, 1903, was cancelled by the WUP administration because they would not pay the $1,000 fee that Bucknell demanded as a guarantee.

=== East End Athletic Association ===
East End AA at WUP

Team	1	2	Total
• East End AA	17	11	28
WUP	0	0	0

- Date: November 3, 1903
- Location: Friendship Park
  Pittsburgh, PA
- Referee: Charles Neibling (East End)

The East End AA agreed to play the WUP on November 3. The game was late starting because Coach Mosse had difficulty finding eleven men to play. The contingent that did play gave their best but the East Enders were too strong. The WUP offense was shut out for the fourth time and the WUP defense surrendered five touchdowns. The final score read 28–0 in favor of the East Enders. Because the crowd was so sparse, the WUP officials cancelled the remaining home games and rescheduled them as road games. The WUP lineup for the game against the East End AA was Byron Stroud (left end), Starr (left tackle), Michael Dinger (left guard), Thomas Crea (center), Huntermark (right guard), Edward Trax (right tackle), George Glass (right end), Shaeffer (quarterback), Illtid Page (left halfback), John Biggert (right halfback) and Curt Leidenroth (fullback). The game consisted of twenty minute halves.

=== At Grove City ===
WUP at Grove City

Team	1	2	Total
WUP	0	0	0
Grove City	0	0	0

- Date: November 7, 1903
- Location: Grove City Grounds
  Grove City, PA
- Referee: Gans (W.U.P.)

The WUP eleven traveled to Grove City, Pennsylvania on November 7 to meet the Grove City Wolverines. The WUP defense played a strong game. The Wolverines had the ball in WUP territory most of the first half but were unable to score. In the second half Grove City drove the ball to the WUP fifteen yard line but again the WUP defense stiffened and Grove City's fullback Locke missed a field goal. After an exchange of punts, the WUP offense secured the ball on their forty-yard line. From there the backs were able to advance the ball in short plunges and end runs to the thirteen yard line of the Wolverines as time ran out. The final score read 0-0. The WUP lineup for the game against Grove City was Byron Stroud (left end), Starr (left tackle), Robert Hinchman (left guard), Michael Dinger (center), Huntermark (right guard), Curt Leidenroth (right tackle), Mason (right end), John Edwards (quarterback), Illtid Page (left halfback), John Biggert (right halfback) and Edward Trax (fullback). Substitutions during the game were: Cropp replaced Robert Hinchman at left guard; Robert Hinchman replaced Curt Leidenroth at right tackle; Shaeffer replaced Mason at right end; and Curt Leidenroth replaced Edward Trax at fullback. The game consisted of twenty minute halves.

=== At Marietta ===
WUP at Marietta

Team	1	2	Total
WUP	0	6	6
• Marietta	34	11	45

- Date: November 14, 1903
- Location: Marietta Grounds
  Marietta, Ohio
- Referee: Gaines (U. of Pennsylvania)

The WUPs closed out their dismal season with a trip to Marietta, Ohio to take on the Pioneers of Marietta College. In the first half the WUP offense fumbled on more than one possession allowing the Pioneers to easily score thirty-four unanswered points. After halftime, Marietta played their substitutes and scored two more touchdowns. Late in the game, the WUP defense blocked a punt and recovered the ball on Marietta's fifteen yard line. A few plays later Illtid Page plunged into the end zone from the three for the only WUP touchdown of the game. John Edwards kicked the goal after and the final result was Marietta 45 – WUP 6. The WUP lineup for the game against Marietta was Byron Stroud (left end), Starr (left tackle), Robert Hinchman (left guard), Thomas Crea (center), Huntermark (right guard), Curt Leidenroth (right tackle), Illtid Page (right end), John Edwards (quarterback), Cropp (left halfback), John Biggert (right halfback) and Edward Trax (fullback). The game consisted of one twenty-five minute half and one twenty minute half.

=== At Westminster (PA) ===
The game scheduled with Westminster College on November 7 was moved to November 21 in New Wilmington, Pa. On November 20, the WUP management cancelled the game.

== Roster ==
The roster of the 1903 Western University of Pennsylvania football team:

- Curt Liedenroth (tackle) earned his Doctor of Dental Surgery degree in 1906 and resided in Bellevue, Pa.
- Charles Ertzman (end) earned his Pharmacy degree in 1905 and resided in Pittsburgh, Pa.
- Thomas Crea (center) earned his Civil Engineering degree in 1905 and resided in Greenville, Pa.
- John Edwards (halfback) earned his Bachelor of Science degree in 1904 and resided in Cincinnati, Ohio.
- Michael Dinger (center) earned his Doctor of Medicine degree in 1905 and resided in Morrisdale, Pa.
- Ray Alexander (guard) earned his Doctor of Medicine degree in 1905 and resided in Bolivar, Pa.
- Charles Gans (end) earned a Graduate in Pharmacy degree in 1899 and a Doctor of Medicine degree in 1905. He resided in Brownsville, Pa. He served as Manager of the 1904 team.
- Edward Trax (fullback) earned his Bachelor of Science degree in 1906 and resided in McKeesport, Pa.
- Theophilus Starzynski (tackle) earned his Doctor of Medicine degree in 1904 and resided in Pittsburgh, Pa.
- Edward Ord (guard) earned his Doctor of Medicine degree in 1904 and resided in McKeesport, Pa.
- Robert Hinchman (guard) earned his Doctor of Medicine degree in 1906 and resided in McKeesport, Pa.
- George Glass (end) earned his Graduate in Pharmacy degree in 1904 and resided in Cross Creek, Pa.
- Porter Wall (halfback) earned his Doctor of Medicine degree in 1904 and resided in Monongahela, Pa.
- Illtid Page (halfback) earned his Mechanical Engineering degree in 1904 and resided in Pittsburgh, Pa.
- John Biggert (end) earned his Associate Engineering degree in 1906 and resided in Crafton, Pa.
- Thomas Aye (guard) earned his Doctor of Medicine degree in 1905 and resided in Kelly Station, Pa.
- Andrew Cloak (guard) earned his Doctor of Medicine degree in 1904 and resided in Freedom, Pa.
- Clyde McGogney (end) earned his Doctor of Medicine degree in 1905 and resided in Kaylor, Pa.
- Huntermark (guard)
- Martin (guard)
- Carpenter (quarterback)
- Jackson (fullback)
- Reed (guard)
- Starr (tackle)
- Shaeffer (quarterback)
- Mason (end)
- Cropp (guard)
- Henry (halfback)

== Coaching staff ==
- Arthur St. Leger 'Texas” Mosse (coach) played college football at Kansas and coached at Warrensburg Teachers College for two seasons.
- C. L. Palmer (manager) earned his Doctor of Medicine degree in 1905.
- Carl Gauter (assistant manager) earned his Associate Engineering degree in 1906.
- Byron Stroud (captain/end) earned his Bachelor of Science degree in 1904.
