= 1903 Yale Bulldogs football team =

American college football season

1903 Yale Bulldogs football
- Conference: Independent
- Record: 11–1
- Head coach: George B. Chadwick (1st season)
- Captain: Charles D. Rafferty
- Home stadium: Yale Field

1903 Eastern college football independents records
	Conf.			Overall
Team	W	L	T	W		L		T
Princeton		–		11	–	0	–	0
Yale		–		11	–	1	–	0
Columbia		–		9	–	1	–	0
Dartmouth		–		9	–	1	–	0
Geneva		–		9	–	1	–	0
Holy Cross		–		8	–	2	–	0
Temple		–		4	–	1	–	0
Washington & Jefferson		–		8	–	2	–	0
Lehigh		–		9	–	2	–	1
Harvard		–		9	–	3	–	0
Penn		–		9	–	3	–	0
Army		–		6	–	2	–	1
Carlisle		–		6	–	2	–	1
Amherst		–		7	–	3	–	0
Lafayette		–		7	–	3	–	0
Cornell		–		6	–	3	–	1
Colgate		–		4	–	2	–	1
Penn State		–		5	–	3	–	0
Swarthmore		–		6	–	4	–	0
Dickinson		–		7	–	5	–	0
Brown		–		5	–	4	–	1
Syracuse		–		5	–	4	–	0
Fordham		–		1	–	1	–	0
Franklin & Marshall		–		5	–	5	–	1
Buffalo		–		4	–	4	–	0
Rutgers		–		4	–	4	–	1
Delaware		–		4	–	4	–	0
Villanova		–		2	–	2	–	0
Bucknell		–		4	–	5	–	0
Vermont		–		4	–	5	–	0
Tufts		–		5	–	8	–	0
Wesleyan		–		3	–	6	–	1
Springfield Training School		–		1	–	3	–	1
NYU		–		2	–	5	–	0
New Hampshire		–		2	–	6	–	1
Pittsburgh College		–		1	–	5	–	1
Western U. Penn.		–		1	–	8	–	1

The 1903 Yale Bulldogs football team represented Yale University in the 1903 college football season. The Bulldogs finished with an 11–1 record under first-year head coach George B. Chadwick. The team outscored its opponents by a combined 312 to 26 score with the only loss being by an 11–6 score to Princeton.

Four Yale players (fullback Ledyard Mitchell, end Charles D. Rafferty, tackle James Hogan and guard James Bloomer) were consensus picks for the 1903 College Football All-America Team. Quarterback Foster Rockwell and halfback Harold Metcalf were also selected as first-team All-Americans by Charles Chadwick, and end Tom Shevlin was a first-team pick by the San Antonio Daily Light.

== Schedule ==
Date	Time	Opponent	Site	Result	Attendance	Source
September 26		Trinity (CT)	Yale Field; New Haven, CT	W 35–0		
September 30		Tufts	Yale Field; New Haven, CT	W 19–0		
October 3		Vermont	Yale Field; New Haven, CT	W 46–0		
October 7		Wesleyan	Yale Field; New Haven, CT	W 33–0		
October 10		Springfield Training School	Yale Field; New Haven, CT	W 22–0		
October 14		Holy Cross	Yale Field; New Haven, CT	W 36–10		
October 17		Penn State	Yale Field; New Haven, CT	W 27–0		
October 24		at Army	The Plain; West Point, NY	W 17–5		
October 31		at Columbia	Polo Grounds; New York, NY	W 25–0		
November 7		Syracuse	Yale Field; New Haven, CT	W 30–0		
November 14		Princeton	Yale Field; New Haven, CT (rivalry)	L 6–11	30,000	
November 21	2:00 p.m.	at Harvard	Harvard Stadium; Boston, MA (rivalry)	W 16–0	37,000	

== Roster ==
- Arthur W. Allen, E
- Leon H. Andrews, T
- Harold S. Batchelder, G
- Lebbeus F. Bissell, T
- James Bloomer, G
- Fernando M. Blount
- Morgan H. Bowman, FB
- Malcolm Farmer, FB
- Carl S. Flanders, G
- Morin S. Hare, E
- James Hogan, T
- Lydig Hoyt, FB
- Willard Hyatt
- Ralph Kinney, T
- Frank McCoy, HB
- Harold G. Metcalf, QB
- James E. Miller, G
- Ledyard Mitchell, HB
- John A. Moorhead, E
- Sydney B. Morton, G
- Chester T. Neal, E
- Jack Owsley, HB
- James C. Preston, HB
- Charles D. Rafferty, E
- Foster Rockwell, QB
- J. Clinton Roraback, C
- Tom Shevlin, E
- Philip C. Smith, C
- Willard B. Soper, HB
- John A. Stevenson, FB
- Stillman, E
- Spencer Turner, T
- Twitchwell, QB
- Burnside Winslow
