= 1903 Penn Quakers football team =

American college football season

1903 Penn Quakers football
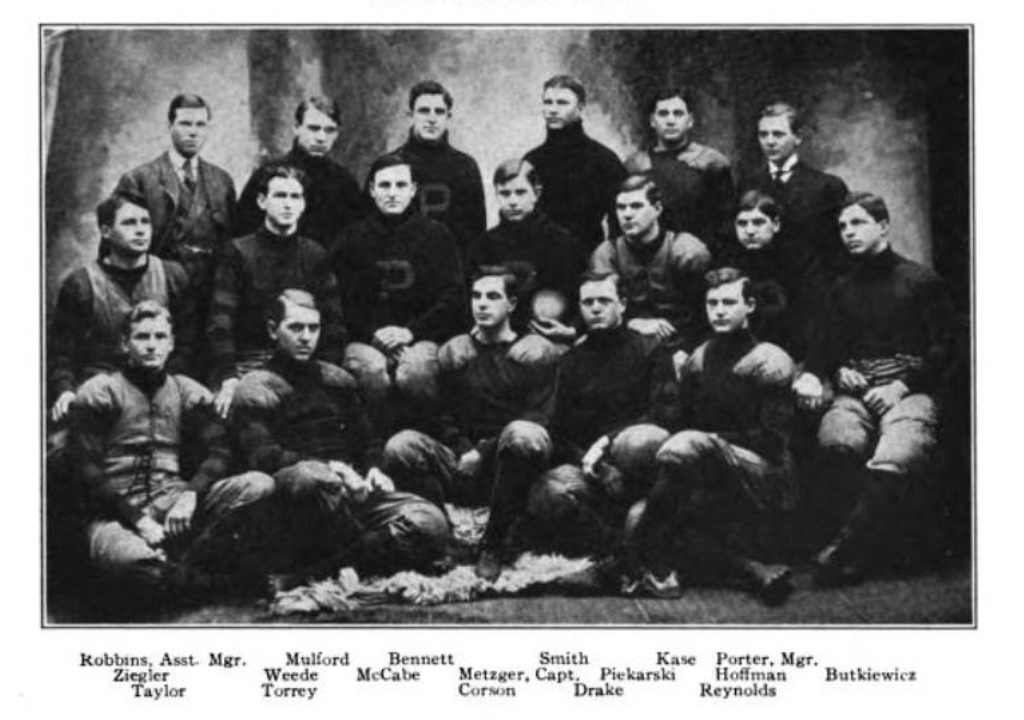
- Conference: Independent
- Record: 9–3
- Head coach: Carl S. Williams (2nd season)
- Captain: Sol Metzger
- Home stadium: Franklin Field

1903 Eastern college football independents records
	Conf.			Overall
Team	W	L	T	W		L		T
Princeton		–		11	–	0	–	0
Yale		–		11	–	1	–	0
Columbia		–		9	–	1	–	0
Dartmouth		–		9	–	1	–	0
Geneva		–		9	–	1	–	0
Holy Cross		–		8	–	2	–	0
Temple		–		4	–	1	–	0
Washington & Jefferson		–		8	–	2	–	0
Lehigh		–		9	–	2	–	1
Harvard		–		9	–	3	–	0
Penn		–		9	–	3	–	0
Army		–		6	–	2	–	1
Carlisle		–		6	–	2	–	1
Amherst		–		7	–	3	–	0
Lafayette		–		7	–	3	–	0
Cornell		–		6	–	3	–	1
Colgate		–		4	–	2	–	1
Penn State		–		5	–	3	–	0
Swarthmore		–		6	–	4	–	0
Dickinson		–		7	–	5	–	0
Brown		–		5	–	4	–	1
Syracuse		–		5	–	4	–	0
Fordham		–		1	–	1	–	0
Franklin & Marshall		–		5	–	5	–	1
Buffalo		–		4	–	4	–	0
Rutgers		–		4	–	4	–	1
Delaware		–		4	–	4	–	0
Villanova		–		2	–	2	–	0
Bucknell		–		4	–	5	–	0
Vermont		–		4	–	5	–	0
Tufts		–		5	–	8	–	0
Wesleyan		–		3	–	6	–	1
Springfield Training School		–		1	–	3	–	1
NYU		–		2	–	5	–	0
New Hampshire		–		2	–	6	–	1
Pittsburgh College		–		1	–	5	–	1
Western U. Penn.		–		1	–	8	–	1

The 1903 Penn Quakers football team represented the University of Pennsylvania as an independent during the 1903 college football season. The Quakers finished with a 9–3 record in their second year under head coach Carl S. Williams. Significant games included victories over Penn State (39–0), Brown (30–0), and Cornell (42–0), and losses to Columbia (18–6), Harvard (17–10), and Carlisle (16–6). The 1903 Penn team outscored its opponents by a combined total of 370 to 57. Guard Frank Piekarski was the only Penn player to receive recognition on the 1903 College Football All-America Team; Piekarski received third-team honors from Walter Camp.

Franklin Field was rebuilt and expanded prior to the 1903 season. Seating was increased to 25,000 and new brick walls constructed around the field and stands. It was opened on September 26, 1903 prior to Penn's first game of the season against Dickinson. Invitations were sent to 2,000 individuals including the governor of Pennsylvania, the members of the state legislature, and city officials including the mayor, council, judges, and heads of municipal departments. Penn officials gathered at Houston Hall and paraded to Franklin Field where the provost raised the red and blue flag above the field.

== Schedule ==
Date	Opponent	Site	Result	Attendance	Source
September 26	Dickinson	Franklin Field; Philadelphia, PA	W 27–0		
September 30	Franklin & Marshall	Franklin Field; Philadelphia, PA	W 17–0		
October 3	Lehigh	Franklin Field; Philadelphia, PA	W 16–0		
October 7	Haverford	Franklin Field; Philadelphia, PA	W 58–0		
October 10	Penn State	Franklin Field; Philadelphia, PA	W 39–0		
October 14	Gettysburg	Franklin Field; Philadelphia, PA	W 72–0		
October 17	Brown	Franklin Field; Philadelphia, PA	W 30–0		
October 24	at Columbia	Polo Grounds; New York, NY	L 6–18		
October 31	Bucknell	Franklin Field; Philadelphia, PA	W 47–6		
November 7	Harvard	Franklin Field; Philadelphia, PA (rivalry)	L 10–17	23,000	
November 14	Carlisle	Franklin Field; Philadelphia, PA	L 6–16		
November 26	Cornell	Franklin Field; Philadelphia, PA (rivalry)	W 42–0		
