= 1903 Amherst football team =

American college football season

1903 Amherst football
- Conference: Independent
- Record: 7–3
- Head coach: Harry A. Smith (2nd season)
- Home stadium: Pratt Field

1903 Eastern college football independents records
	Conf.			Overall
Team	W	L	T	W		L		T
Princeton		–		11	–	0	–	0
Yale		–		11	–	1	–	0
Columbia		–		9	–	1	–	0
Dartmouth		–		9	–	1	–	0
Geneva		–		9	–	1	–	0
Holy Cross		–		8	–	2	–	0
Temple		–		4	–	1	–	0
Washington & Jefferson		–		8	–	2	–	0
Lehigh		–		9	–	2	–	1
Harvard		–		9	–	3	–	0
Penn		–		9	–	3	–	0
Army		–		6	–	2	–	1
Carlisle		–		6	–	2	–	1
Amherst		–		7	–	3	–	0
Lafayette		–		7	–	3	–	0
Cornell		–		6	–	3	–	1
Colgate		–		4	–	2	–	1
Penn State		–		5	–	3	–	0
Swarthmore		–		6	–	4	–	0
Dickinson		–		7	–	5	–	0
Brown		–		5	–	4	–	1
Syracuse		–		5	–	4	–	0
Fordham		–		1	–	1	–	0
Franklin & Marshall		–		5	–	5	–	1
Buffalo		–		4	–	4	–	0
Rutgers		–		4	–	4	–	1
Delaware		–		4	–	4	–	0
Villanova		–		2	–	2	–	0
Bucknell		–		4	–	5	–	0
Vermont		–		4	–	5	–	0
Tufts		–		5	–	8	–	0
Wesleyan		–		3	–	6	–	1
Springfield Training School		–		1	–	3	–	1
NYU		–		2	–	5	–	0
New Hampshire		–		2	–	6	–	1
Pittsburgh College		–		1	–	5	–	1
Western U. Penn.		–		1	–	8	–	1

The 1903 Amherst football team represented Amherst College as an independent during the 1903 college football season. Led by second-year head coach Harry A. Smith, Amherst compiled a record of 7–3. The team defeated Harvard.

== Schedule ==
Date	Time	Opponent	Site	Result	Attendance	Source
September 26		Williston	Pratt Field; Amherst, MA	W 6–0		
October 3		Colby	Amherst, MA	W 24–0		
October 7		at Bowdoin	Brunswick, ME	W 23–0		
October 10	3:00 p.m.	at Harvard	Soldiers' Field; Boston, MA	W 5–0		
October 17		at Columbia	Polo Grounds; New York, NY	L 0–12	4,000	
October 21		Union (NY)	Amherst, MA	W 16–0		
October 24		Trinity (CT)	Amherst, MA	W 18–0		
October 31		at Holy Cross	Holy Cross Field; Worcester, MA	L 0–36	1,500	
November 7		Dartmouth	Amherst, MA	L 0–18		
November 14		Massachusetts	Amherst, MA	W 11–6		
