= 1903 Penn State football team =

American college football season

1903 Penn State football
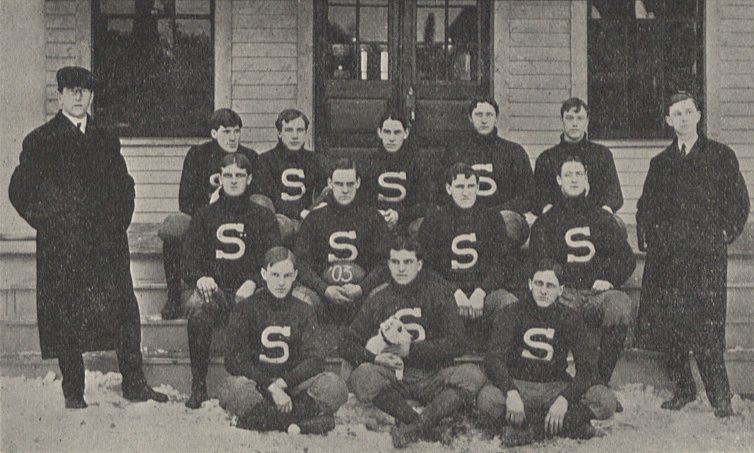
- Conference: Independent
- Record: 5–3
- Head coach: Daniel A. Reed (1st season)
- Captain: Ed Whitworth
- Home stadium: Beaver Field

1903 Eastern college football independents records
	Conf.			Overall
Team	W	L	T	W		L		T
Princeton		–		11	–	0	–	0
Yale		–		11	–	1	–	0
Columbia		–		9	–	1	–	0
Dartmouth		–		9	–	1	–	0
Geneva		–		9	–	1	–	0
Holy Cross		–		8	–	2	–	0
Temple		–		4	–	1	–	0
Washington & Jefferson		–		8	–	2	–	0
Lehigh		–		9	–	2	–	1
Harvard		–		9	–	3	–	0
Penn		–		9	–	3	–	0
Army		–		6	–	2	–	1
Carlisle		–		6	–	2	–	1
Amherst		–		7	–	3	–	0
Lafayette		–		7	–	3	–	0
Cornell		–		6	–	3	–	1
Colgate		–		4	–	2	–	1
Penn State		–		5	–	3	–	0
Swarthmore		–		6	–	4	–	0
Dickinson		–		7	–	5	–	0
Brown		–		5	–	4	–	1
Syracuse		–		5	–	4	–	0
Fordham		–		1	–	1	–	0
Franklin & Marshall		–		5	–	5	–	1
Buffalo		–		4	–	4	–	0
Rutgers		–		4	–	4	–	1
Delaware		–		4	–	4	–	0
Villanova		–		2	–	2	–	0
Bucknell		–		4	–	5	–	0
Vermont		–		4	–	5	–	0
Tufts		–		5	–	8	–	0
Wesleyan		–		3	–	6	–	1
Springfield Training School		–		1	–	3	–	1
NYU		–		2	–	5	–	0
New Hampshire		–		2	–	6	–	1
Pittsburgh College		–		1	–	5	–	1
Western U. Penn.		–		1	–	8	–	1

The 1903 Penn State football team was an American football team that represented Pennsylvania State College—now known as Pennsylvania State University–as an independent during the 1903 college football season. The team was coached by Daniel A. Reed and played its home games on Beaver Field in State College, Pennsylvania.

== Schedule ==
Date	Opponent	Site	Result	Attendance	Source
September 19	Dickinson Seminary	Beaver Field; State College, PA	W 60–0		
October 3	Allegheny	Beaver Field; State College, PA	W 24–5		
October 10	at Penn	Franklin Field; Philadelphia, PA	L 0–39		
October 17	at Yale	Yale Field; New Haven, CT	L 0–27		
October 24	at Western University of Pennsylvania	Colosseum; Pittsburgh, PA (rivalry)	W 59–0	600	
October 31	at Navy	Worden Field; Annapolis, MD	W 17–0		
November 14	vs. Dickinson	Williamsport, PA	L 0–6		
November 26	vs. Washington & Jefferson	Exposition Park; Pittsburgh, PA	W 23–0	6,000	
