= 1903 New Hampshire football team =

American college football season

1903 New Hampshire football
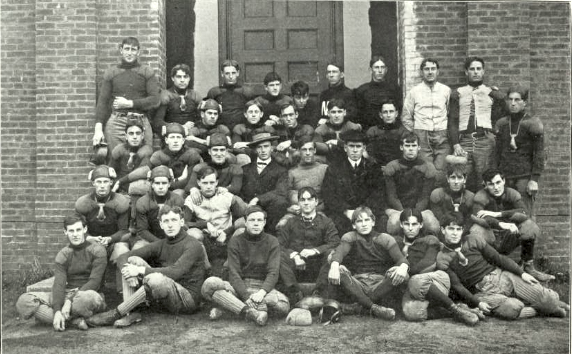
- 1903 team photo; several players can be seen with nose armor protectors around their necks
- Conference: Independent
- Record: 2–6–1 (Note: per the University's media guide; 1903 sources differ)
- Head coach: John Scannell (2nd season)
- Captain: Horace J. Pettee
- Home stadium: Central Park, Dover, NH

1903 Eastern college football independents records
| | Conf. | | | Overall |
| Team | W | L | T | W | | L | | T |
|---|---|---|---|---|---|---|---|---|
| Princeton | | – | | 11 | – | 0 | – | 0 |
| Yale | | – | | 11 | – | 1 | – | 0 |
| Columbia | | – | | 9 | – | 1 | – | 0 |
| Dartmouth | | – | | 9 | – | 1 | – | 0 |
| Geneva | | – | | 9 | – | 1 | – | 0 |
| Holy Cross | | – | | 8 | – | 2 | – | 0 |
| Temple | | – | | 4 | – | 1 | – | 0 |
| Washington & Jefferson | | – | | 8 | – | 2 | – | 0 |
| Lehigh | | – | | 9 | – | 2 | – | 1 |
| Harvard | | – | | 9 | – | 3 | – | 0 |
| Penn | | – | | 9 | – | 3 | – | 0 |
| Army | | – | | 6 | – | 2 | – | 1 |
| Carlisle | | – | | 6 | – | 2 | – | 1 |
| Amherst | | – | | 7 | – | 3 | – | 0 |
| Lafayette | | – | | 7 | – | 3 | – | 0 |
| Cornell | | – | | 6 | – | 3 | – | 1 |
| Colgate | | – | | 4 | – | 2 | – | 1 |
| Penn State | | – | | 5 | – | 3 | – | 0 |
| Swarthmore | | – | | 6 | – | 4 | – | 0 |
| Dickinson | | – | | 7 | – | 5 | – | 0 |
| Brown | | – | | 5 | – | 4 | – | 1 |
| Syracuse | | – | | 5 | – | 4 | – | 0 |
| Fordham | | – | | 1 | – | 1 | – | 0 |
| Franklin & Marshall | | – | | 5 | – | 5 | – | 1 |
| Buffalo | | – | | 4 | – | 4 | – | 0 |
| Rutgers | | – | | 4 | – | 4 | – | 1 |
| Delaware | | – | | 4 | – | 4 | – | 0 |
| Villanova | | – | | 2 | – | 2 | – | 0 |
| Bucknell | | – | | 4 | – | 5 | – | 0 |
| Vermont | | – | | 4 | – | 5 | – | 0 |
| Tufts | | – | | 5 | – | 8 | – | 0 |
| Wesleyan | | – | | 3 | – | 6 | – | 1 |
| Springfield Training School | | – | | 1 | – | 3 | – | 1 |
| NYU | | – | | 2 | – | 5 | – | 0 |
| New Hampshire | | – | | 2 | – | 6 | – | 1 |
| Pittsburgh College | | – | | 1 | – | 5 | – | 1 |
| Western U. Penn. | | – | | 1 | – | 8 | – | 1 |

The 1903 New Hampshire football team (Note: The school did not adopt the Wildcats nickname until February 1926; before then, they were generally referred to as "the blue and white".) was an American football team that represented New Hampshire College of Agriculture and the Mechanic Arts (Note: The school was often referred to as New Hampshire College or New Hampshire State College in newspapers of the era.) during the 1903 college football season—the school became the University of New Hampshire in 1923. Under the direction of second-year head coach John Scannell, the team finished with a record of 2–7–1 or 2–6–1, per 1903 sources or modern sources, respectively.

== Schedule ==
Scoring during this era awarded five points for a touchdown, one point for a conversion kick (extra point), and five points for a field goal. Teams played in the one-platoon system and the forward pass was not yet legal. Games were played in two halves rather than four quarters.

| Date | Opponent | Site | per 1903 sources | | per modern sources | |
| Date | Opponent | Site | Result | Source | Result | Source |
|---|---|---|---|---|---|---|
| September 23 | at Exeter Academy | Exeter, NH | L 0–21 | | L 0–21 | |
| September 26 | at Maine (rivalry) | Orono, ME | L 0–18 | | L 0–18 | |
| October 3 | at Bowdoin | Whittier Field · Brunswick, ME | L 0–18 | | L 0–18 | |
| October 10 | at Andover Academy | Brothers Field · Andover, MA | L 0–27 | | L 0–27 | |
| October 14 | at Exeter Academy | Exeter, NH | L 0–29 | | not listed | |
| October 17 | at Dover Athletic Assoc. | Central Park · Dover, NH | W 6–0 | | W 6–0 | |
| October 24 | Maine (rivalry) | Central Park · Dover, NH | L 0–27 | | L 0–27 | |
| October 31 | Bates | Central Park · Dover, NH | T 6–6 | | T 6–6 | |
| November 7 | Worcester Tech | Central Park · Dover, NH | L 0–15 | | L 0–15 | |
| November 14 | Tufts (second team) | Central Park · Dover, NH | W 6–0 | | W 6–0 | |
| Overall record | | | (2–7–1) | | (2–6–1) | |

The scores of two late-season contests between New Hampshire and Dover A. C. were listed in Boston newspapers; one New Hampshire win (10–5 on November 21) and one New Hampshire loss (5–6 on November 26, Thanksgiving).

In addition to the varsity games listed above, New Hampshire's second team (reserves) defeated Dover High School, 22–0, and played the Exeter Academy second team to a tie, 5–5.

The New Hampshire College Monthly stated that the team played 14 games, having "lost eight, won four, and tied twice" (4–8–2). The College Monthly provided recaps of 12 games (the 10 varsity games listed in the table, plus the two games played by the second team); it did not provide recaps of the two late-season games against Dover A. C. (Note: It is inferred that the "Dover Athletic Association" reported in The New Hampshire College Monthly and the "Dover A. C." reported in Boston newspapers were one and the same.) The overall record of the 10 varsity games (2–7–1), two second-team games (1–0–1), and two late-season games (1–1) does tally to 4–8–2.

The team's original schedule included games against Massachusetts State College and Boston College, but there is no record of those games being played.

The September 26 game was the first meeting of the New Hampshire and Maine football programs. The score is listed as 18–0 in the New Hampshire football media guide and in contemporary news reports of 1903; College Football Data Warehouse and the Maine football media guide list it as 10–0.
