= 1903 Harvard Crimson football team =

American college football season

1903 Harvard Crimson football
- Conference: Independent
- Record: 9–3
- Head coach: John Cranston (1st season)
- Home stadium: Soldiers' Field; Harvard Stadium

1903 Eastern college football independents records
	Conf.			Overall
Team	W	L	T	W		L		T
Princeton		–		11	–	0	–	0
Yale		–		11	–	1	–	0
Columbia		–		9	–	1	–	0
Dartmouth		–		9	–	1	–	0
Geneva		–		9	–	1	–	0
Holy Cross		–		8	–	2	–	0
Temple		–		4	–	1	–	0
Washington & Jefferson		–		8	–	2	–	0
Lehigh		–		9	–	2	–	1
Harvard		–		9	–	3	–	0
Penn		–		9	–	3	–	0
Army		–		6	–	2	–	1
Carlisle		–		6	–	2	–	1
Amherst		–		7	–	3	–	0
Lafayette		–		7	–	3	–	0
Cornell		–		6	–	3	–	1
Colgate		–		4	–	2	–	1
Penn State		–		5	–	3	–	0
Swarthmore		–		6	–	4	–	0
Dickinson		–		7	–	5	–	0
Brown		–		5	–	4	–	1
Syracuse		–		5	–	4	–	0
Fordham		–		1	–	1	–	0
Franklin & Marshall		–		5	–	5	–	1
Buffalo		–		4	–	4	–	0
Rutgers		–		4	–	4	–	1
Delaware		–		4	–	4	–	0
Villanova		–		2	–	2	–	0
Bucknell		–		4	–	5	–	0
Vermont		–		4	–	5	–	0
Tufts		–		5	–	8	–	0
Wesleyan		–		3	–	6	–	1
Springfield Training School		–		1	–	3	–	1
NYU		–		2	–	5	–	0
New Hampshire		–		2	–	6	–	1
Pittsburgh College		–		1	–	5	–	1
Western U. Penn.		–		1	–	8	–	1

The 1903 Harvard Crimson football team represented Harvard University in the 1903 college football season. The Crimson finished with a 9–3 record under first-year head coach John Cranston. Walter Camp selected two Harvard players as first-team selections to his 1903 College Football All-America Team, tackle Daniel Knowlton and guard Andrew Marshall.

The 1903 season was also notable for the opening of Harvard Stadium, which hosted its first game on November 14 against Dartmouth.

== Schedule ==
Date	Time	Opponent	Site	Result	Attendance	Source
September 26	3:07 p.m.	Williams	Soldiers' Field; Boston, MA	W 17–0		
September 30	4:00 p.m.	Bowdoin	Soldiers' Field; Boston, MA	W 24–0		
October 3	3:00 p.m.	Maine	Soldiers' Field; Boston, MA	W 6–0		
October 7	4:00 p.m.	Bates	Soldiers' Field; Boston, MA	W 23–0	3,000	
October 10	3:00 p.m.	Amherst	Soldiers' Field; Boston, MA	L 0–5	2,000	
October 14	4:00 p.m.	Wesleyan	Soldiers' Field; Boston, MA	W 17–6	3,500	
October 17		at Army	The Plain; West Point, NY	W 5–0	8,000–30,000	
October 24	3:00 p.m.	Brown	Soldiers' Field; Boston, MA	W 29–0	9,000	
October 31	3:00 p.m.	Carlisle	Soldiers' Field; Boston, MA	W 12–11	12,000	
November 7		at Penn	Franklin Field; Philadelphia, PA (rivalry)	W 17–10	23,000	
November 14	3:00 p.m.	Dartmouth	Harvard Stadium; Boston, MA (rivalry)	L 0–11	15,000	
November 21	2:00 p.m.	Yale	Harvard Stadium; Boston, MA (rivalry)	L 0–16	37,000	
