= 1903 Holy Cross football team =

American college football season

1903 Holy Cross football
- Conference: Independent
- Record: 8–2
- Head coach: Frank Cavanaugh (1st season)
- Captain: Tom Stankard
- Home stadium: Holy Cross Field

1903 Eastern college football independents records
	Conf.			Overall
Team	W	L	T	W		L		T
Princeton		–		11	–	0	–	0
Yale		–		11	–	1	–	0
Columbia		–		9	–	1	–	0
Dartmouth		–		9	–	1	–	0
Geneva		–		9	–	1	–	0
Holy Cross		–		8	–	2	–	0
Temple		–		4	–	1	–	0
Washington & Jefferson		–		8	–	2	–	0
Lehigh		–		9	–	2	–	1
Harvard		–		9	–	3	–	0
Penn		–		9	–	3	–	0
Army		–		6	–	2	–	1
Carlisle		–		6	–	2	–	1
Amherst		–		7	–	3	–	0
Lafayette		–		7	–	3	–	0
Cornell		–		6	–	3	–	1
Colgate		–		4	–	2	–	1
Penn State		–		5	–	3	–	0
Swarthmore		–		6	–	4	–	0
Dickinson		–		7	–	5	–	0
Brown		–		5	–	4	–	1
Syracuse		–		5	–	4	–	0
Fordham		–		1	–	1	–	0
Franklin & Marshall		–		5	–	5	–	1
Buffalo		–		4	–	4	–	0
Rutgers		–		4	–	4	–	1
Delaware		–		4	–	4	–	0
Villanova		–		2	–	2	–	0
Bucknell		–		4	–	5	–	0
Vermont		–		4	–	5	–	0
Tufts		–		5	–	8	–	0
Wesleyan		–		3	–	6	–	1
Springfield Training School		–		1	–	3	–	1
NYU		–		2	–	5	–	0
New Hampshire		–		2	–	6	–	1
Pittsburgh College		–		1	–	5	–	1
Western U. Penn.		–		1	–	8	–	1

The 1903 Holy Cross football team was an American football team that represented the College of the Holy Cross in the 1903 college football season. In its first season under head coach Frank Cavanaugh, the team compiled an 8–2 record. Tom Stankard was the team captain.

After years of playing home games at off-campus stadiums in Worcester, Massachusetts, Holy Cross opened its own football field in time for the start of the 1903 season. The new stadium, called simply Holy Cross Field by the press, was later named Fitton Field, and today serves as the college's baseball stadium.

== Schedule ==
Date	Opponent	Site	Result	Attendance	Source
September 26	Massachusetts	Holy Cross Field; Worcester, MA	W 6–0		
October 3	at Dartmouth	Alumni Oval; Hanover, NH	L 0–18		
October 10	at Wesleyan	Andrus Field; Middletown, CT	W 11–5		
October 14	at Yale	Yale Field; New Haven, CT	L 10–36	4,000	
October 24	Tufts	Holy Cross Field; Worcester, MA	W 6–5	1,000	
October 31	Amherst	Holy Cross Field; Worcester, MA	W 36–0	1,500	
November 7	Springfield Training School	Holy Cross Field; Worcester, MA	W 27–5	1,000	
November 14	at Maine	Maplewood Field; Bangor, ME	W 5–0	2,000	
November 21	Worcester Polytechnic	Holy Cross Field; Worcester, MA	W 41–0	2,500	
November 26	at Tufts	Huntington Avenue Grounds; Boston, MA	W 32–0	2,500	
