= 1903 Princeton Tigers football team =

American college football season

1903 Princeton Tigers football
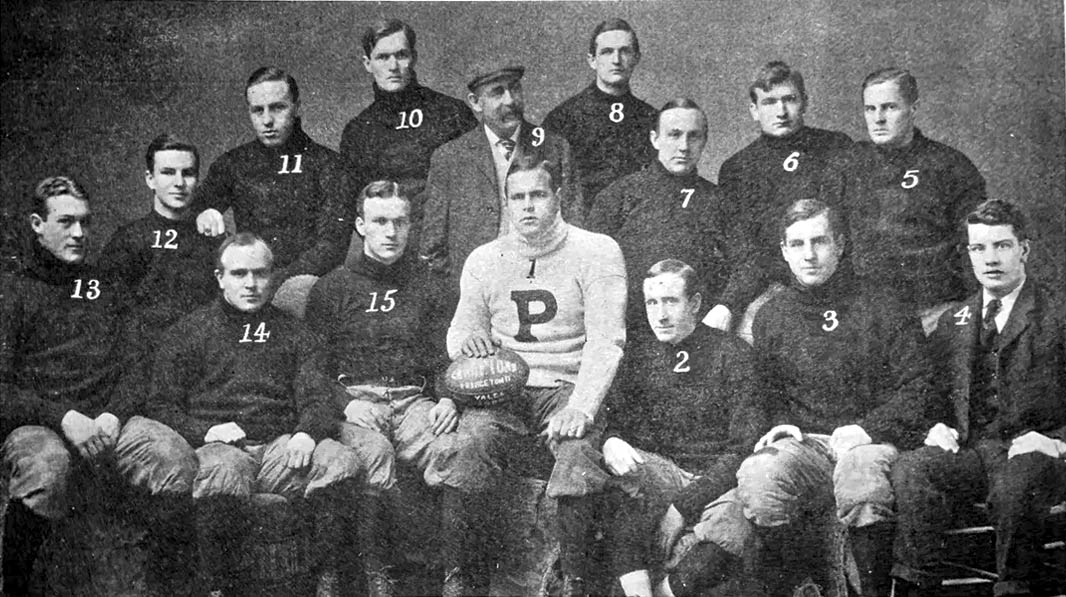

National champion (Billingsley, Helms, Houlgate, Davis) Co-national champion (NCF)
- Conference: Independent
- Record: 11–0
- Head coach: Art Hillebrand (1st season)
- Captain: John DeWitt
- Home stadium: University Field

1903 Eastern college football independents records
	Conf.			Overall
Team	W	L	T	W		L		T
Princeton		–		11	–	0	–	0
Yale		–		11	–	1	–	0
Columbia		–		9	–	1	–	0
Dartmouth		–		9	–	1	–	0
Geneva		–		9	–	1	–	0
Holy Cross		–		8	–	2	–	0
Temple		–		4	–	1	–	0
Washington & Jefferson		–		8	–	2	–	0
Lehigh		–		9	–	2	–	1
Harvard		–		9	–	3	–	0
Penn		–		9	–	3	–	0
Army		–		6	–	2	–	1
Carlisle		–		6	–	2	–	1
Amherst		–		7	–	3	–	0
Lafayette		–		7	–	3	–	0
Cornell		–		6	–	3	–	1
Colgate		–		4	–	2	–	1
Penn State		–		5	–	3	–	0
Swarthmore		–		6	–	4	–	0
Dickinson		–		7	–	5	–	0
Brown		–		5	–	4	–	1
Syracuse		–		5	–	4	–	0
Fordham		–		1	–	1	–	0
Franklin & Marshall		–		5	–	5	–	1
Buffalo		–		4	–	4	–	0
Rutgers		–		4	–	4	–	1
Delaware		–		4	–	4	–	0
Villanova		–		2	–	2	–	0
Bucknell		–		4	–	5	–	0
Vermont		–		4	–	5	–	0
Tufts		–		5	–	8	–	0
Wesleyan		–		3	–	6	–	1
Springfield Training School		–		1	–	3	–	1
NYU		–		2	–	5	–	0
New Hampshire		–		2	–	6	–	1
Pittsburgh College		–		1	–	5	–	1
Western U. Penn.		–		1	–	8	–	1

The 1903 Princeton Tigers football team was an American football team that represented Princeton University as an independent during the 1903 college football season. In their first season under head coach Art Hillebrand, the Tigers compiled a perfect 11–0 record, shut out 10 of 11 opponents, and outscored all opponents by a total of 259 to 6. John DeWitt was the team captain.

There was no contemporaneous system in 1903 for determining a national champion. However, Princeton was retroactively named as the national champion by the Billingsley Report, Helms Athletic Foundation, Houlgate System, and Parke H. Davis, and as a co-national champion by the National Championship Foundation (NCF). Michigan was co-champion by the NCF.

Three Princeton players were selected as consensus first-team players on the 1903 All-America team: halfback Dana Kafer; end Howard Henry; and guard John DeWitt. DeWitt was later inducted into the College Football Hall of Fame. Other notable players included end Ralph Tipton Davis.

== Schedule ==
Date	Opponent	Site	Result	Attendance	Source
September 30	Swarthmore	University Field; Princeton, NJ	W 34–0		
October 3	Georgetown	University Field; Princeton, NJ	W 5–0		
October 7	Gettysburg	University Field; Princeton, NJ	W 68–0		
October 10	at Brown	Providence, RI	W 29–0		
October 14	Lehigh	University Field; Princeton, NJ	W 12–0		
October 17	Carlisle	University Field; Princeton, NJ	W 11–0		
October 21	Bucknell	University Field; Princeton, NJ	W 17–0		
October 24	Dartmouth	University Field; Princeton, NJ	W 17–0		
October 31	Cornell	University Field; Princeton, NJ	W 44–0		
November 7	Lafayette	University Field; Princeton, NJ	W 11–0		
November 14	at Yale	Yale Field; New Haven, CT (rivalry)	W 11–6	30,000	
