= 1903 Washington & Jefferson Red and Black football team =

American college football season

1903 Washington & Jefferson Red and Black football
- Conference: Independent
- Record: 8–2
- Head coach: William B. Seaman (2nd season)
- Captain: Hayes
- Home stadium: College Park

1903 Eastern college football independents records
	Conf.			Overall
Team	W	L	T	W		L		T
Princeton		–		11	–	0	–	0
Yale		–		11	–	1	–	0
Columbia		–		9	–	1	–	0
Dartmouth		–		9	–	1	–	0
Geneva		–		9	–	1	–	0
Holy Cross		–		8	–	2	–	0
Temple		–		4	–	1	–	0
Washington & Jefferson		–		8	–	2	–	0
Lehigh		–		9	–	2	–	1
Harvard		–		9	–	3	–	0
Penn		–		9	–	3	–	0
Army		–		6	–	2	–	1
Carlisle		–		6	–	2	–	1
Amherst		–		7	–	3	–	0
Lafayette		–		7	–	3	–	0
Cornell		–		6	–	3	–	1
Colgate		–		4	–	2	–	1
Penn State		–		5	–	3	–	0
Swarthmore		–		6	–	4	–	0
Dickinson		–		7	–	5	–	0
Brown		–		5	–	4	–	1
Syracuse		–		5	–	4	–	0
Fordham		–		1	–	1	–	0
Franklin & Marshall		–		5	–	5	–	1
Buffalo		–		4	–	4	–	0
Rutgers		–		4	–	4	–	1
Delaware		–		4	–	4	–	0
Villanova		–		2	–	2	–	0
Bucknell		–		4	–	5	–	0
Vermont		–		4	–	5	–	0
Tufts		–		5	–	8	–	0
Wesleyan		–		3	–	6	–	1
Springfield Training School		–		1	–	3	–	1
NYU		–		2	–	5	–	0
New Hampshire		–		2	–	6	–	1
Pittsburgh College		–		1	–	5	–	1
Western U. Penn.		–		1	–	8	–	1

The 1903 Washington & Jefferson football team was an American football team that represented Washington & Jefferson College as an independent during the 1903 college football season. Led by second-year head coach William B. Seaman, the team compiled a record of 6–4.

== Schedule ==
Date	Opponent	Site	Result	Attendance	Source
September 26	California Normal (PA)	Washington, PA	W 12–0		
October 3	Marietta	Washington, PA	W 21–0		
October 10	Western Reserve	Washington, PA	W 42–0		
October 17	California Normal (PA)	California, PA	W 6–0		
October 24	Bethany (WV)	College Park; Washington, PA	W 45–0		
October 31	Ohio Medical	Washington, PA	W 36–0		
November 7	at Navy	Worden Field; Annapolis, MD	W 16–0		
November 14	Geneva	College Park; Washington, PA	W 6–0	3,000	
November 21	West Virginia	College Park; Washington, PA	L 5–5 (forfeit)		
November 26	vs. Penn State	Exposition Park; Pittsburgh, PA	L 0–23	6,000	
