= Dana Kafer =

American football player (1880–1937)

Princeton Tigers
- Position: Halfback

Personal information
- Born: March 23, 1880; Trenton, New Jersey, U.S.
- Died: March 22, 1937 (aged 56); Lawrenceville, New Jersey, U.S.

Career information
- College: Princeton; Yale

Awards and highlights
- National champion (1903); Consensus All-American (1903)

Joseph Dana Kafer (March 23, 1880 – March 22, 1937) was an American football player. He played college football for the Princeton Tigers football team from 1901 to 1903 and was selected as a consensus All-American at the halfback position in 1903. Kafer sustained a shoulder injury during a football game in October 1901 that kept him out of the lineup for the remainder of the season. He scored three touchdowns in Princeton's 1903 victory over Cornell. He was also a member of the Yale baseball team.

Kafer grew up in Lawrenceville, New Jersey. Before enrolling at Yale, he attended preparatory school at the Lawrenceville School. From 1912 to 1927, he worked as a businessman in Trenton, New Jersey. Kafer was also employed as a civil engineer for the J. L. Mott Iron Works in Trenton. He was married to Lyda Elsie Pierson Kafer. In 1937, he died of a heart attack at his home in Lawrenceville, New Jersey, at age 57.
