= 1903 college football season =

American college football season

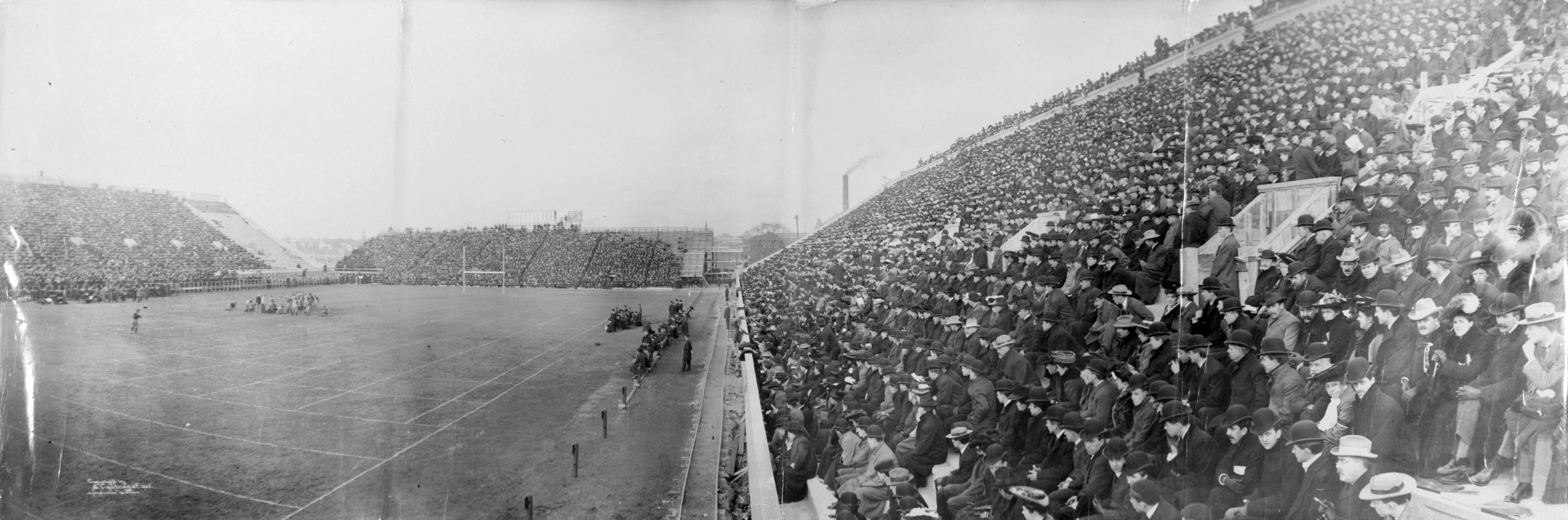
- The Harvard-Dartmouth game
- Champion(s): Michigan; Princeton

The 1903 college football season had no clear-cut champion, with the Official NCAA Division I Football Records Book listing Michigan and Princeton as having been selected national champions.

The season took place during an era when college football was rapidly growing in popularity, with new concrete stadiums and large crowds, but also widespread concern over injuries and the violent style of play.

== Background ==
By 1903, college football had evolved from its late nineteenth-century rugby roots into a distinct gridiron game. Rule changes led by Walter Camp in the 1880s had reduced teams to eleven players per side, created the line of scrimmage, and introduced a system of downs that required the offense to gain yardage to retain possession.

Scoring values were also different from the modern game. A touchdown was worth five points, as was a field goal, while the safety was worth two points. The early 1900s saw rapid growth in the sport’s popularity, with around 250 colleges fielding teams and new, larger stadiums being built. In 1903, for example, Harvard opened a concrete football stadium with a capacity of roughly 42,000 spectators, reflecting the sport’s status as a major collegiate attraction.

== Season overview ==
The 1903 college football season had no clear-cut national champion. The Official NCAA Division I Football Records Book lists both Michigan and Princeton as national champions for the season, based on selections by various contemporary and retrospective selectors.

The season took place during a period when college football was drawing large crowds but also facing increasing criticism over the violence of play. Historians note that rules changes from the 1890s had only briefly reduced injuries and fatalities, and concern over brutality in the early 1900s would soon help lead to sweeping reforms and the creation of what became the NCAA.

== Conference standings ==
=== Major conference standings ===
1903 Colorado Football Association standings
	Conf.					Overall
Team	W		L		T	W		L		T
Colorado $	4	–	0	–	0	8	–	2	–	0
Colorado Agricultural	3	–	1	–	0	5	–	1	–	0
Colorado Mines	2	–	2	–	0	3	–	4	–	0
Colorado College	1	–	3	–	0	4	–	5	–	0
Denver	0	–	4	–	0	6	–	7	–	0
$ – Conference champion

1903 Southern Intercollegiate Athletic Association football standings
	Conf.					Overall
Team	W		L		T	W		L		T
Clemson +	2	–	0	–	1	4	–	1	–	1
Cumberland (TN) +	4	–	1	–	1	6	–	1	–	1
Sewanee	5	–	1	–	0	7	–	1	–	0
Vanderbilt	5	–	1	–	1	6	–	1	–	1
Mississippi A&M	2	–	0	–	2	3	–	0	–	2
Georgia	3	–	2	–	0	3	–	4	–	0
Ole Miss	1	–	1	–	1	2	–	1	–	1
Texas	0	–	0	–	1	5	–	1	–	2
Kentucky State	0	–	0	–	0	6	–	1	–	0
Alabama	3	–	4	–	0	3	–	4	–	0
Auburn	2	–	3	–	0	4	–	3	–	0
Tennessee	2	–	4	–	0	4	–	5	–	0
Georgia Tech	1	–	4	–	0	3	–	5	–	0
Tulane	0	–	1	–	1	2	–	2	–	1
Mercer	0	–	1	–	0	0	–	1	–	0
Nashville	0	–	2	–	0	1	–	3	–	0
LSU	0	–	5	–	0	4	–	5	–	0
SW Presbyterian			–					–
+ – Conference co-champions

1903 Western Conference football standings
	Conf.					Overall
Team	W		L		T	W		L		T
Minnesota +	3	–	0	–	1	14	–	0	–	1
Michigan +	3	–	0	–	1	11	–	0	–	1
Northwestern +	1	–	0	–	2	10	–	1	–	3
Chicago	4	–	1	–	1	12	–	2	–	1
Iowa	1	–	1	–	0	9	–	2	–	0
Indiana	1	–	2	–	0	4	–	4	–	0
Illinois	1	–	5	–	0	8	–	6	–	0
Wisconsin	0	–	3	–	1	6	–	3	–	1
Purdue	0	–	2	–	0	4	–	2	–	0
+ – Conference co-champions

=== Independents ===
1903 Eastern college football independents records
	Conf.			Overall
Team	W	L	T	W		L		T
Princeton		–		11	–	0	–	0
Yale		–		11	–	1	–	0
Columbia		–		9	–	1	–	0
Dartmouth		–		9	–	1	–	0
Geneva		–		9	–	1	–	0
Holy Cross		–		8	–	2	–	0
Temple		–		4	–	1	–	0
Washington & Jefferson		–		8	–	2	–	0
Lehigh		–		9	–	2	–	1
Harvard		–		9	–	3	–	0
Penn		–		9	–	3	–	0
Army		–		6	–	2	–	1
Carlisle		–		6	–	2	–	1
Amherst		–		7	–	3	–	0
Lafayette		–		7	–	3	–	0
Cornell		–		6	–	3	–	1
Colgate		–		4	–	2	–	1
Penn State		–		5	–	3	–	0
Swarthmore		–		6	–	4	–	0
Dickinson		–		7	–	5	–	0
Brown		–		5	–	4	–	1
Syracuse		–		5	–	4	–	0
Fordham		–		1	–	1	–	0
Franklin & Marshall		–		5	–	5	–	1
Buffalo		–		4	–	4	–	0
Rutgers		–		4	–	4	–	1
Delaware		–		4	–	4	–	0
Villanova		–		2	–	2	–	0
Bucknell		–		4	–	5	–	0
Vermont		–		4	–	5	–	0
Tufts		–		5	–	8	–	0
Wesleyan		–		3	–	6	–	1
Springfield Training School		–		1	–	3	–	1
NYU		–		2	–	5	–	0
New Hampshire		–		2	–	6	–	1
Pittsburgh College		–		1	–	5	–	1
Western U. Penn.		–		1	–	8	–	1

1903 Midwestern college football independents records
	Conf.			Overall
Team	W	L	T	W		L		T
Nebraska		–		11	–	0	–	0
North Dakota		–		7	–	0	–	0
Central Michigan		–		6	–	0	–	0
Notre Dame		–		8	–	0	–	1
Iowa State		–		8	–	1	–	0
Marquette		–		7	–	1	–	0
Lake Forest		–		6	–	1	–	0
North Dakota Agricultural		–		5	–	1	–	0
Haskell		–		7	–	2	–	0
St. Xavier		–		7	–	2	–	0
Fairmount		–		6	–	2	–	0
Wabash		–		9	–	3	–	0
Wittenberg		–		5	–	2	–	1
Doane		–		2	–	1	–	0
Northern Illinois State		–		4	–	2	–	0
American Medical		–		6	–	3	–	0
Kansas		–		6	–	3	–	0
Drake		–		5	–	3	–	0
Kirksville Osteopaths		–		5	–	3	–	0
Iowa State Normal		–		4	–	3	–	1
Ohio Medical		–		5	–	4	–	0
Lincoln (MO)		–		1	–	1	–	0
Michigan State Normal		–		4	–	4	–	0
Washington University		–		4	–	4	–	2
Heidelberg		–		3	–	4	–	2
Kansas State		–		3	–	4	–	1
Detroit College		–		3	–	4	–	0
Shurtleff		–		2	–	4	–	1
Ohio		–		2	–	4	–	0
South Dakota Agricultural		–		1	–	2	–	0
Mount Union		–		2	–	5	–	1
DePauw		–		2	–	6	–	1
Miami (OH)		–		1	–	4	–	0
Missouri		–		1	–	7	–	1
Western Illinois		–		0	–	3	–	1
Cincinnati		–		1	–	8	–	0
Baldwin–Wallace		–		0	–	1	–	0
Buchtel		–		0	–	2	–	0
Butler		–		0	–	3	–	0
Chicago P&S		–		0	–	4	–	0

1903 Southern college football independents records
	Conf.			Overall
Team	W	L	T	W		L		T
Livingstone		–		3	–	0	–	0
Kentucky University		–		7	–	1	–	0
West Virginia		–		7	–	1	–	0
VPI		–		5	–	1	–	0
South Carolina		–		8	–	2	–	0
Stetson		–		2	–	1	–	1
Virginia		–		7	–	2	–	1
Georgetown		–		7	–	3	–	0
VMI		–		2	–	1	–	0
Texas A&M		–		7	–	3	–	1
North Carolina		–		6	–	3	–	0
Maryland		–		7	–	4	–	0
East Florida Seminary		–		3	–	2	–	1
Florida State College		–		3	–	2	–	1
Oklahoma		–		5	–	4	–	3
Kendall		–		3	–	3	–	0
Louisiana Industrial		–		1	–	1	–	0
North Carolina A&M		–		4	–	4	–	0
Oklahoma A&M		–		0	–	0	–	2
Southwestern Louisiana Industrial		–		1	–	1	–	0
Tusculum		–		1	–	1	–	0
Arkansas		–		3	–	4	–	0
Navy		–		4	–	7	–	1
Howard (AL)		–		2	–	3	–	0
Columbian		–		2	–	5	–	0
Florida		–		1	–	3	–	0
Goldey College		–		0	–	1	–	1
Davidson		–		1	–	4	–	0
Tennessee Docs		–		0	–	4	–	0
TCU		–		0	–	7	–	0

1903 Far West college football independents records
	Conf.			Overall
Team	W	L	T	W		L		T
Stanford		–		8	–	0	–	3
Montana Agricultural		–		1	–	0	–	1
California		–		6	–	1	–	2
Washington		–		6	–	1	–	0
Oregon		–		4	–	2	–	1
USC		–		4	–	2	–	0
Albany College (OR)		–		4	–	3	–	0
Utah Agricultural		–		3	–	0	–	0
New Mexico A&M		–		2	–	0	–	1
Arizona		–		2	–	0	–	0
Tempe Normal		–		2	–	0	–	0
Idaho		–		4	–	2	–	0
Wyoming		–		3	–	2	–	0
Cheney Normal		–		3	–	2	–	2
Washington Agricultural		–		3	–	3	–	2
Utah		–		3	–	5	–	0
Nevada State		–		2	–	4	–	2
Oregon Agricultural		–		2	–	4	–	1
Montana		–		2	–	5	–	0
Academy of Idaho		–		0	–	1	–	1

=== Minor conferences ===
Conference	Champion(s)	Record
Michigan Intercollegiate Athletic Association	Albion; Michigan Agricultural	4–1
Ohio Athletic Conference	Case	5–0

=== Minor conference standings ===
1903 Michigan Intercollegiate Athletic Association football standings
	Conf.					Overall
Team	W		L		T	W		L		T
Michigan Agricultural +	4	–	1	–	0	6	–	1	–	1
Albion	3	–	2	–	1	3	–	3	–	2
+ – Conference co-champions

1903 Ohio Athletic Conference football standings
	Conf.					Overall
Team	W		L		T	W		L		T
Case $	5	–	0	–	0	8	–	2	–	0
Ohio State	3	–	1	–	0	8	–	3	–	0
Oberlin	2	–	2	–	1	4	–	4	–	1
Ohio Wesleyan	2	–	3	–	0	5	–	4	–	0
Western Reserve	1	–	3	–	0	3	–	6	–	0
Kenyon	0	–	4	–	1	2	–	6	–	1
$ – Conference champion

== Awards and honors ==
=== All-Americans ===
The consensus All-America team included:

Position	Name	Height	Weight (lbs.)	Class	Hometown	Team
QB	Jimmy Johnson	5'7"	138	Sr.	Edgerton, Wisconsin	Carlisle
QB	Myron E. Witham			Sr.	Pigeon Cove, Massachusetts	Dartmouth
HB	Willie Heston	5'8"	190	Jr.	Grant's Pass, Oregon	Michigan
HB	Dana Kafer			Sr.	Lawrenceville, New Jersey	Princeton
FB	Richard Shore Smith			Sr.		Columbia
FB	Ledyard Mitchell			Sr.		Yale
E	Howard Henry			Sr.	Philadelphia, Pennsylvania	Princeton
T	Daniel Knowlton			So.		Harvard
T	James Hogan	5'10"	210	Jr.	County Tipperary, Ireland	Yale
G	John DeWitt	6'1"	198	Sr.	Phillipsburg, New Jersey	Princeton
G	Andrew Marshall			Sr.	Phillipsburg, New Jersey	Harvard
C	Henry Hooper			Sr.	New Hampshire	Dartmouth
G	James Bloomer			Jr.	Cincinnati, Ohio	Yale
T	Fred Schacht			Sr.	Minneapolis, Minnesota	Minnesota
E	Charles D. Rafferty			Sr.	Pittsburgh, Pennsylvania	Yale
