= Leon H. Andrews =

American football player and coach (1883–1949)

Biographical details
- Born: August 9, 1883; Hartford, Connecticut, U.S.
- Died: May 29, 1949 (aged 65); New Canaan, Connecticut, U.S.
- Education: Yale (1907)

Playing career
- 1903: Yale
- 1905: Yale

Coaching career (HC unless noted)
- 1908: Grinnell
- 1910: Texas A&M (assistant)

Head coaching record
- Overall: 5–4

Leon Hudson Andrews (August 9, 1883 – May 29, 1949) was an American college football player and coach. He played football at Yale University, lettering in 1903 and 1905. Andrews served as the head football coach at Grinnell College in Grinnell, Iowa in 1908, compiling a record of 5–4, and was an assistant coach at Texas A&M University in 1910.

== Head coaching record ==
Year	Team	Overall	Conference	Standing	Bowl/playoffs
Grinnell Pioneers (Independent) (1908)
1908	Grinnell	5–4			
Grinnell:		5–4			
Total:		5–4			
