= University Field (Princeton) =

Stadium in Princeton, New Jersey, US

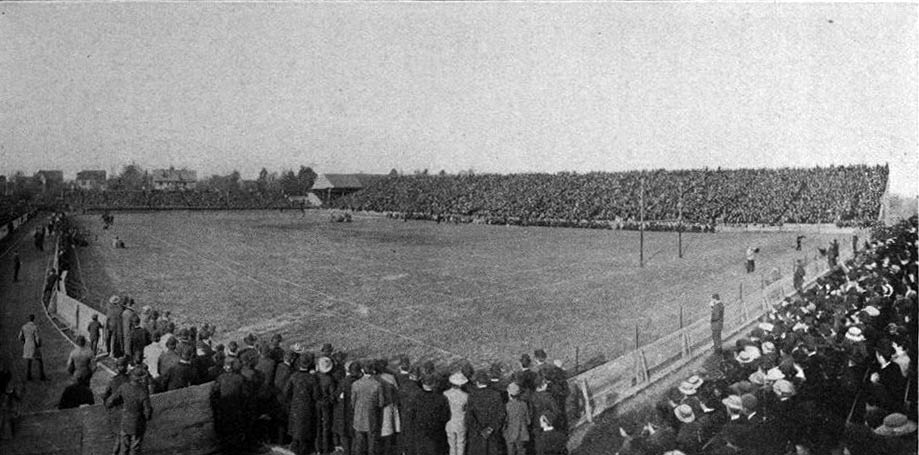
- Location: Princeton, New Jersey
- Owner: Princeton University
- Capacity: 20,000

Construction
- Built: 1876
- Opened: 1876
- Expanded: 1896
- Closed: 1960
- Demolished: 1960

Tenants
- Princeton Tigers football (1876–1913); Princeton Tigers baseball (1876–1960)

University Field was a stadium in Princeton, New Jersey which opened in 1876 through a gift by William Libbey, then a student at the College of New Jersey (renamed Princeton University in 1896). It hosted the Princeton University Tigers football team until they moved to Palmer Stadium in 1914. It was home to the Princeton baseball team from its opening until 1960, when the field was replaced by Princeton's Engineering Quad. The stadium held 20,000 people at its peak.
