= 1903 Marshall Thundering Herd football team =

American college football season

1903 Marshall Thundering Herd football
- Conference: Independent
- Record: 3–1–1
- Head coach: George Ford (1st season)
- Captain: Roy Grass
- Home stadium: Central Field

1903 Southern college football independents records
	Conf.			Overall
Team	W	L	T	W		L		T
Livingstone		–		3	–	0	–	0
Kentucky University		–		7	–	1	–	0
West Virginia		–		7	–	1	–	0
VPI		–		5	–	1	–	0
South Carolina		–		8	–	2	–	0
Stetson		–		2	–	1	–	1
Virginia		–		7	–	2	–	1
Georgetown		–		7	–	3	–	0
VMI		–		2	–	1	–	0
Texas A&M		–		7	–	3	–	1
North Carolina		–		6	–	3	–	0
Maryland		–		7	–	4	–	0
East Florida Seminary		–		3	–	2	–	1
Florida State College		–		3	–	2	–	1
Oklahoma		–		5	–	4	–	3
Kendall		–		3	–	3	–	0
Louisiana Industrial		–		1	–	1	–	0
North Carolina A&M		–		4	–	4	–	0
Oklahoma A&M		–		0	–	0	–	2
Southwestern Louisiana Industrial		–		1	–	1	–	0
Tusculum		–		1	–	1	–	0
Arkansas		–		3	–	4	–	0
Navy		–		4	–	7	–	1
Howard (AL)		–		2	–	3	–	0
Columbian		–		2	–	5	–	0
Florida		–		1	–	3	–	0
Goldey College		–		0	–	1	–	1
Davidson		–		1	–	4	–	0
Tennessee Docs		–		0	–	4	–	0
TCU		–		0	–	7	–	0

The 1903 Marshall Thundering Herd football team represented Marshall College (now Marshall University) as an independent during the 1903 college football season. Marshall posted a 3–1–1 record, outscoring its opposition 37–25. Home games were played on a campus field called "Central Field" which is presently Campus Commons.

== Schedule ==
Date	Opponent	Site	Result
October 10	at Middleport HS	Middleport, OH	T 0–0
October 24	Ashland HS^{†}	Central Field; Huntington, WV	W 11–5
November 14	Huntington Semi-Pro	Central Field; Huntington, WV	W 11–5
November 21	at Ashland HS	Ashland, KY	L 0–15
November 24	Shelton	Central Field; Huntington, WV	W 15–0
^{†}Homecoming
