= 1903 Delaware football team =

American college football season

1903 Delaware football
- Conference: Independent
- Record: 4–4
- Head coach: Nathan Mannakee (1st season)
- Captain: Bassett Ferguson

1903 Southern college football independents records
	Conf.			Overall
Team	W	L	T	W		L		T
Livingstone		–		3	–	0	–	0
Kentucky University		–		7	–	1	–	0
West Virginia		–		7	–	1	–	0
VPI		–		5	–	1	–	0
South Carolina		–		8	–	2	–	0
Stetson		–		2	–	1	–	1
Virginia		–		7	–	2	–	1
Georgetown		–		7	–	3	–	0
VMI		–		2	–	1	–	0
Texas A&M		–		7	–	3	–	1
North Carolina		–		6	–	3	–	0
Maryland		–		7	–	4	–	0
East Florida Seminary		–		3	–	2	–	1
Florida State College		–		3	–	2	–	1
Oklahoma		–		5	–	4	–	3
Kendall		–		3	–	3	–	0
Louisiana Industrial		–		1	–	1	–	0
North Carolina A&M		–		4	–	4	–	0
Oklahoma A&M		–		0	–	0	–	2
Southwestern Louisiana Industrial		–		1	–	1	–	0
Tusculum		–		1	–	1	–	0
Arkansas		–		3	–	4	–	0
Navy		–		4	–	7	–	1
Howard (AL)		–		2	–	3	–	0
Columbian		–		2	–	5	–	0
Florida		–		1	–	3	–	0
Goldey College		–		0	–	1	–	1
Davidson		–		1	–	4	–	0
Tennessee Docs		–		0	–	4	–	0
TCU		–		0	–	7	–	0

The 1903 Delaware football team represented Delaware College—now known as the University of Delaware–as an independent during the 1903 college football season. Led by first-year head coach Nathan Mannakee, Delaware compiled a record of 4–4.

== Schedule ==
Date	Opponent	Site	Result	Source
October 3	Washington College	Newark, DE	W 27–0	
October 10	Rutgers	Front and Union Streets gridiron; Wilmington, DE	W 5–0	
October 14	Wilmington Conference Academy	Newark, DE	W 23–0	
October 17	at Swarthmore	Whittier Field; Swarthmore, PA	L 0–11	
October 24	St. John's (MD)	Wilmington, DE	L 0–5	
November 7	Western Maryland	Wilmington, DE	L 6–16	
November 14	at Haverford	Haverford, PA	L 0–37	
November 27	Maryland	Wilmington, DE	W 16–0	
