= 1903 Baylor football team =

American college football season

1903 Baylor football
- Conference: Independent
- Record: 4–3–1
- Head coach: R. N. Watts (1st season)
- Captain: E. T. Wicker

1903 Southern college football independents records
	Conf.			Overall
Team	W	L	T	W		L		T
Livingstone		–		3	–	0	–	0
Kentucky University		–		7	–	1	–	0
West Virginia		–		7	–	1	–	0
VPI		–		5	–	1	–	0
South Carolina		–		8	–	2	–	0
Stetson		–		2	–	1	–	1
Virginia		–		7	–	2	–	1
Georgetown		–		7	–	3	–	0
VMI		–		2	–	1	–	0
Texas A&M		–		7	–	3	–	1
North Carolina		–		6	–	3	–	0
Maryland		–		7	–	4	–	0
East Florida Seminary		–		3	–	2	–	1
Florida State College		–		3	–	2	–	1
Oklahoma		–		5	–	4	–	3
Kendall		–		3	–	3	–	0
Louisiana Industrial		–		1	–	1	–	0
North Carolina A&M		–		4	–	4	–	0
Oklahoma A&M		–		0	–	0	–	2
Southwestern Louisiana Industrial		–		1	–	1	–	0
Tusculum		–		1	–	1	–	0
Arkansas		–		3	–	4	–	0
Navy		–		4	–	7	–	1
Howard (AL)		–		2	–	3	–	0
Columbian		–		2	–	5	–	0
Florida		–		1	–	3	–	0
Goldey College		–		0	–	1	–	1
Davidson		–		1	–	4	–	0
Tennessee Docs		–		0	–	4	–	0
TCU		–		0	–	7	–	0

The 1903 Baylor football team was an American football team that represented Baylor University as an independent during the 1903 college football season. In its first season under head coach R. N. Watts, the team compiled a 4–3–1 record and was outscored by a total of 69 to 46.

== Schedule ==
Date	Time	Opponent	Site	Result	Source
October 3		TCU	Waco, TX (rivalry)	W 12–0	
October 17		Fort Worth	Waco, TX	W 23–0	
October 24	3:30 p.m.	at Texas	Varsity Athletic Field; Austin, TX (rivalry)	L 0–48	
November 7		Texas A&M	Waco, TX (rivalry)	T 0–0	
November 14		Texas A&M	Waco, TX	L 0–16	
November 21		at Texas A&M	College Station, TX	L 0–5	
November 26		TCU	Waco, TX	W 4–0	
November 30		Deaf and Dumb Institute	Waco, TX	W 6–0	

== Season summary ==
In October, coach Watts also acted as referee for the Vanderbilt at Texas game.

=== Oct. 3 vs. TCU ===
Opening the local football season, Baylor defeated TCU in front of a large crowd on the former's campus; a street railway strike forced many spectators to arrive by less conventional means, such as hay wagons.

=== Vs. Texas ===
Following the wins against Texas Christian University and Fort Worth University, Baylor was considered a strong contender for the state championship if the team could win the game against Texas. Although Texas won, the team's captain, Rembert Watson was injured and missed Texas's next game against Arkansas.

=== Nov. 7 vs. Texas A&M ===
The game "was the hardest fought game ever played at Waco," and while A&M held the advantage, they could not score before time ended each half.
