= Devlin (surname) =

Devlin Ó Doibhlin
- Language: Irish

Origin
- Region of origin: Ireland

Other names
- Variant forms: Ó Doibhlin, Ó Dobhailéin, Ó Doibhilin, Ó Duibhleanna
- Anglicisations: O'Devlin, Devlin

O'Devlin (Irish: Ó Doibhlin) is the surname of a Gaelic Irish family of the Uí Néill who were chiefs in the far northeastern of the present-day County of Tyrone, bordering on Lough Neagh and the Ballinderry River. The O'Develins claimed a common descent from Develin (in Irish: Dobhuilen or "Raging Valour", an Irish noble of the royal blood of Aileach who flourished in or about the eighth century AD and was eighth in descent from Owen, the founder of the clan). Develin was a scion of that branch of the clan Owen known as the Sons of Erca (Cenel Mic Erca) because of their descent from Muirchertach Mac Erca, grandson of Owen.

== Origins variants ==
(Anglicized form of Irish Ó Dobhailéin 'descendant of Dobhailéan')

Alternative spellings of the name are Develon, Develin, Devolin, Devlin, Deveyn, Devellen, Dobhilen, Dobhailen, Dobhailean, Dobhalen, Doibhilen, Doibhelen, Doibhilein, Dhoibhilein, Dubhalen, Doibhlin, Dubhlein, Dubhlein, Dubhlin, Dubhlen, Dublein, Duiblein, DeVilling, and Devilling.

== History ==
After the Battle of Downpatrick, MacNamee, hereditary poet O'Neill,, composed a poem called The Lament for O'Neill, in which he bewails the death of his king and the numerous nobles of his race who were slain with him. Among the nobles was O'Develin, of whom the poet sings:

"Alas! Deep grief overspread the country To anticipate the death of O'Develin Gofraidh our grief unto Judgement Day Generous of his banquet was his youth"

== People with the surname ==
- Adam Devlin (born 1969), English guitarist and songwriter
- Alex Devlin (born 1949), Canadian basketball player
- Anne Devlin (1780–1851), Irish housekeeper
- Anne Devlin (writer) (contemporary), Northern Irish writer
- Art Devlin (baseball) (1879–1948), American baseball player
- Ben Devlin, various people
- Bernadette Devlin McAliskey (born 1947), Northern Ireland politician
- Bernard Devlin (1923 – 1983), Canadian film producer, script writer and director
- Bernie Devlin, American psychiatrist
- Bruce Devlin (born 1937), Australian golfer, sportscaster, and golf course designer
- Cammy Devlin (born 1998), Australian soccer player
- Chris Thomas Devlin, American screenwriter
- Chris Devlin-Young (born 1961), American paralytic ski racer
- Daniel Devlin (1814–1867), American businessman from New York City
- Dean Devlin (born 1962), American screenwriter and producer
- Denis Devlin (1908–1959), Irish poet and diplomat
- Desmond Devlin (contemporary), American comedy writer
- Ernie Devlin (1920–1976), English footballer
- Es Devlin (born 1971), English stage designer
- Fay Devlin (contemporary), Irish footballer
- Harry Devlin (contemporary) (1918–2001), American artist and cartoonist
- J. G. Devlin (1907–1991), Northern Irish actor from Belfast
- James Devlin (born 1989), British rapper
- Janet Devlin (born 1994), Northern Irish singer, finalist on The X Factor (UK series 8)
- Jim Devlin (1849–1883), American baseball player
- John H. Devlin, Irish musician
- Joseph Devlin (1872–1934), Northern Ireland politician
- Keith Devlin (contemporary), English mathematician and writer
- Larry Devlin (1922-2008), American CIA officer
- Leah McCall Devlin (born 1954), American health educator and dentist
- Mark D. Devlin (1948–2005), American author
- Martina Devlin, Irish writer
- Matt Devlin (Irish republican) (contemporary), Irish member of the IRA and Sinn Féin
- Matt Devlin (sportscaster) (contemporary), American sportscaster
- Michael Devlin (musician) (born 1942), American opera bass-baritone
- Michael J. Devlin (born 1965), pleaded guilty to kidnapping two children in Missouri, US
- Mike Devlin (entrepreneur) (contemporary), American businessman
- Mike Devlin (athlete) (born 1969), American football player
- Mikey Devlin (born 1993), Scottish football player
- Nicky Devlin (born 1993), Scottish football player
- Paddy Devlin (1925–1999), Northern Ireland politician
- Patrick Devlin, Baron Devlin (1905–1992), British judge
- Paul Devlin (filmmaker) (contemporary), sports editor and documentary filmmaker
- Paul Devlin (footballer) (born 1972), British football player
- Stuart Devlin (1931–2018), British coin engraver
- Susan Devlin (born 1931), Irish-American badminton player
- Susan J. Devlin, American statistician
- Tim Devlin (born 1959), British politician
- William Devlin, various people

== Fictional characters ==
- Burke Devlin, character on Dark Shadows
- Clare Devlin, one of the main characters on Derry Girls
- Clark Devlin, a primary character in the movie The Tuxedo
- Ernie Devlin, the title character from the 1974 Hanna-Barbera cartoon series Devlin
- Jack Devlin, character in the movie The Net
- Jack Devlin, character in the 1998 John Woo movie Blackjack
- Governor James Devlin, character in the HBO drama Oz
- Joseph Devlin, a character in Columbo episode The Conspirators, played by Clive Revill
- Liam Devlin, an IRA agent cooperating with the Germans in the Jack Higgins novel The Eagle Has Landed (played in the 1976 movie by Donald Sutherland)
- Duke Devlin, the English version of the character Ryuji Otogi, from the Yu-Gi-Oh! anime
- Devlin Agamand, a character in the video game World Of Warcraft
- Matt Devlin, a character from Law & Order: UK
- Max Devlin, character in the movie Paradox
- Max Devlin, the shady landlord who makes a deal with the Devil to try to convince three other people to sell their souls to take his place in Hell in The Devil and Max Devlin, played by Elliott Gould
- Sean Devlin, the protagonist of the game The Saboteur
- T.R. Devlin, American government agent portrayed by Cary Grant in Notorious
- Cloaca Devlin, Episcopal bishop in William S. Lind's novel Victoria: A Novel Of 4th Generation War
