= List of Baylor Bears football seasons =

This is a list of college football seasons in which the Baylor Bears have participated. Baylor first began playing football in 1899. The school has fielded a varsity team every year since 1899, except for the 1906, 1943, and 1944 seasons.

== Seasons ==
Year	Coach	Overall	Conference	Standing	Bowl/playoffs	Coaches^{#}	AP^{°}
R.H. Hamilton (Independent) (1899–1900)
1899	R.H. Hamilton	2–1–1					
1900	R.H. Hamilton	3–0					
W.J. Ritchie (Independent) (1901)
1901	W.J. Ritchie	5–3					
J.C. Ewing (Independent) (1902)
1902	J.C. Ewing	3–4–2					
R.N. Watts (Independent) (1903)
1903	R.N. Watts	4–3–1					
Sol Metzger (Independent) (1904)
1904	Sol Metzger	2–5–1					
Archie Webb (Independent) (1905)
1905	Archie Webb	1–6					
1906	No team						
Luther Burleson (Independent) (1907)
1907	Luther Burleson	4–3–1					
Enoch J. Mills (Independent) (1908–1909)
1908	Enoch J. Mills	3–5					
1909	Enoch J. Mills	5–3					
Ralph Glaze (Independent) (1910–1912)
1910	Ralph Glaze	6–1–1					
1911	Ralph Glaze	3–4–2					
1912	Ralph Glaze	3–5					
Norman C. Paine (Independent) (1913)
1913	Norman C. Paine	4–4–2					
Charles Mosely (Independent) (1914)
1914	Charles Mosely	3–5–2					
Charles Mosely (Southwest Conference) (1915–1919)
1915	Charles Mosely	7–1	3–0	T–1st (Note: Baylor forfeited claim to co-champion for using ineligible player.)			
1916	Charles Mosely	9–1	3–1	2nd			
1917	Charles Mosely	6–2–1	2–1	2nd			
1918	Charles Mosely	0–6	0–2	8th			
1919	Charles Mosely	5–3–1	1–3–1	8th			
Frank Bridges (Southwest Conference) (1920–1925)
1920	Frank Bridges	4–4–1	1–2–1	5th			
1921	Frank Bridges	8–3	2–2	4th			
1922	Frank Bridges	8–3	5–0	1st			
1923	Frank Bridges	5–1–2	1–1–2	4th			
1924	Frank Bridges	7–2–1	4–0–1	1st			
1925	Frank Bridges	3–5–2	0–3–2	7th			
Morley Jennings (Southwest Conference) (1926–1940)
1926	Morley Jennings	6–3–1	3–1–1	2nd			
1927	Morley Jennings	2–7	0–5	7th			
1928	Morley Jennings	8–2	3–2	T–3rd			
1929	Morley Jennings	7–3–1	2–2–1	T–4th			
1930	Morley Jennings	6–3–1	3–1–1	2nd			
1931	Morley Jennings	3–6	1–5	6th			
1932	Morley Jennings	3–5–1	1–4–1	T–5th			
1933	Morley Jennings	6–4	4–2	T–2nd			
1934	Morley Jennings	3–7	1–5	7th			
1935	Morley Jennings	8–3	3–3	T–3rd			
1936	Morley Jennings	6–3–1	3–2–1	T–3rd			
1937	Morley Jennings	7–3	3–3	4th			
1938	Morley Jennings	7–2–1	3–2–1	3rd			
1939	Morley Jennings	7–3	4–2	T–2nd			
1940	Morley Jennings	4–6	0–6	7th			
Frank Kimbrough (Southwest Conference) (1941–1946)
1941	Frank Kimbrough	3–6–1	1–4–1	6th			
1942	Frank Kimbrough	6–4–1	3–2–1	4th			
1943	No team						
1944	No team						
1945	Frank Kimbrough	5–5–1	2–4	6th			
1946	Frank Kimbrough	1–8	0–6	7th			
Bob Woodruff (Southwest Conference) (1947–1949)
1947	Bob Woodruff	5–5	1–5	7th			
1948	Bob Woodruff	6–3–2	3–2–1	T–3rd	W Dixie		
1949	Bob Woodruff	8–2	4–2	2nd			20
George Sauer (Southwest Conference) (1950–1955)
1950	George Sauer	7–3	4–2	2nd		15	
1951	George Sauer	8–2–1	4–1–1	2nd	L Orange	9	9
1952	George Sauer	4–4–2	1–3–2	5th			
1953	George Sauer	7–3	4–2	3rd			
1954	George Sauer	7–4	4–2	T–3rd	L Gator		18
1955	George Sauer	5–5	2–4	T–5th			
Sam Boyd (Southwest Conference) (1956–1958)
1956	Sam Boyd	9–2	4–2	3rd	W Sugar	11	11
1957	Sam Boyd	3–6–1	0–5–1	7th			
1958	Sam Boyd	3–7	1–5	7th			
John Bridgers (Southwest Conference) (1959–1968)
1959	John Bridgers	4–6	2–4	5th			
1960	John Bridgers	8–3	5–2	T–2nd	L Gator	12	12
1961	John Bridgers	6–5	2–5	T–6th	W Gotham		
1962	John Bridgers	4–6	3–4	T–4th			
1963	John Bridgers	8–3	6–1	2nd	W Bluebonnet	20	
1964	John Bridgers	5–5	4–3	3rd			
1965	John Bridgers	5–5	3–4	T–4th			
1966	John Bridgers	5–5	3–4	5th			
1967	John Bridgers	1–8–1	0–6–1	8th			
1968	John Bridgers	3–7	3–4	5th			
Bill Beall (Southwest Conference) (1969–1971)
1969	Bill Beall	0–10	0–7	8th			
1970	Bill Beall	2–9	1–6	7th			
1971	Bill Beall	1–9	0–7	8th			
Grant Teaff (Southwest Conference) (1972–1992)
1972	Grant Teaff	5–6	3–4	T–4th			
1973	Grant Teaff	2–9	0–7	8th			
1974	Grant Teaff	8–4	6–1	1st	L Cotton	14	14
1975	Grant Teaff	3–6–2	2–5	6th			
1976	Grant Teaff	7–3–1	4–3–1	4th		19	
1977	Grant Teaff	5–6	3–5	6th			
1978	Grant Teaff	3–8	3–5	7th			
1979	Grant Teaff	8–4	5–3	4th	W Peach	15	14
1980	Grant Teaff	10–2	8–0	1st	L Cotton	13	14
1981	Grant Teaff	5–6	3–5	7th			
1982	Grant Teaff	4–6–1	3–4–1	5th			
1983	Grant Teaff	7–4–1	4–3–1	T–3rd	L Bluebonnet		
1984	Grant Teaff	5–6	4–4	6th			
1985	Grant Teaff	9–3	6–2	3rd	W Liberty	15	17
1986	Grant Teaff	9–3	6–2	2nd	W Bluebonnet	13	12
1987	Grant Teaff	6–5	3–4	6th			
1988	Grant Teaff	6–5	2–5	T–4th			
1989	Grant Teaff	5–6	4–4	4th			
1990	Grant Teaff	6–4–1	5–2–1	T–3rd			
1991	Grant Teaff	8–4	5–3	T–2nd	L Copper		
1992	Grant Teaff	7–5	4–3	T–2nd	W John Hancock		
Chuck Reedy (Southwest Conference) (1993–1995)
1993	Chuck Reedy	5–6	3–4	4th			
1994	Chuck Reedy	7–5	4–3	T–1st	L Alamo		
1995	Chuck Reedy	7–4	5–2	T–2nd			
Chuck Reedy (Big 12 Conference) (1996)
1996	Chuck Reedy	4–7	1–7	6th (South)			
Dave Roberts (Big 12 Conference) (1997–1998)
1997	Dave Roberts	2–9	1–7	6th (South)			
1998	Dave Roberts	2–9	1–7	6th (South)			
Kevin Steele (Big 12 Conference) (1999–2002)
1999	Kevin Steele	1–10	0–8	6th (South)			
2000	Kevin Steele	2–9	0–8	6th (South)			
2001	Kevin Steele	3–8	0–8	6th (South)			
2002	Kevin Steele	3–9	1–7	6th (South)			
Guy Morriss (Big 12 Conference) (2003–2007)
2003	Guy Morriss	3–9	1–7	6th (South)			
2004	Guy Morriss	3–8	1–7	6th (South)			
2005	Guy Morriss	5–6	2–6	5th (South)			
2006	Guy Morriss	4–8	3–5	T–5th (South)			
2007	Guy Morriss	3–9	0–8	6th (South)			
Art Briles (Big 12 Conference) (2008–2015)
2008	Art Briles	4–8	2–6	T–5th (South)			
2009	Art Briles	4–8	1–7	6th (South)			
2010	Art Briles	7–6	4–4	4th (South)	L Texas		
2011	Art Briles	10–3	6–3	T–3rd	W Alamo	12	13
2012	Art Briles	8–5	4–5	T–5th	W Holiday		
2013	Art Briles	11–2	8–1	1st	L Fiesta^{†}	13	13
2014	Art Briles	11–2	8–1	T–1st	L Cotton^{†}	8	7
2015	Art Briles	10–3	6–3	4th	W Russell Athletic	13	13
Jim Grobe (Big 12 Conference) (2016)
2016	Jim Grobe	7–6	3–6	6th	W Cactus		
Matt Rhule (Big 12 Conference) (2017–2019)
2017	Matt Rhule	1–11	1–8	9th			
2018	Matt Rhule	7–6	4–5	6th	W Texas		
2019	Matt Rhule	11–3	8–1	T–1st	L Sugar^{†}	12	13
Dave Aranda (Big 12 Conference) (2020–present)
2020	Dave Aranda	2–7	2–7	9th			
2021	Dave Aranda	12–2	7–2	1st	W Sugar^{†}	5	6
2022	Dave Aranda	6–7	4–5	6th	L Armed Forces		
2023	Dave Aranda	3–9	2–7	T–11th			
2024	Dave Aranda	8–5	6–3	T–5th	L Texas		
2025	Dave Aranda	5–7	3–6	T–11th			
Total:		631-605–41					
National championship Conference title Conference division title or championship game berth
^{†}Indicates Bowl Coalition, Bowl Alliance, BCS, or CFP / New Years' Six bowl.; ^{#}Rankings from final Coaches Poll.
