= List of West Virginia Mountaineers head football coaches =

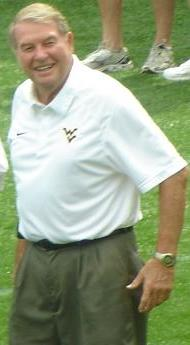
Don Nehlen both coached in and won the most games as head coach of the West Virginia Mountaineers.

The West Virginia Mountaineers college football team represents West Virginia University in the Big 12 Conference (Big 12). The Mountaineers competes as part of the NCAA Division I Football Bowl Subdivision. The program has had 38 head coaches and one interim head coach since it began play during the 1891 season. Since December 2024, Rich Rodriguez has served as West Virginia's head coach.

Through the end of the 2024 season, the Mountaineers have competed in 1,356 games and compiled an overall record of 783 wins, 528 losses, and 46 ties. In that time, 12 coaches have led the Mountaineers in postseason bowl games: Clarence Spears, Marshall Glenn, Dudley DeGroot, Art Lewis, Gene Corum, Jim Carlen, Bobby Bowden, Don Nehlen, Rodriguez, Bill Stewart, Dana Holgorsen, and Neal Brown. Seven of those coaches also won conference championships: Lewis captured five, Corum two, and Carlen one as a member of the Southern Conference; Rodriguez captured four and Nehlen, Stewart, and Holgorsen each captured one as a member of the Big East Conference.

Nehlen is the leader in seasons coached and games won, with 149 victories during his 21 years with the program. Harry E. Trout has the highest winning percentage of those who have coached more than one game, with .857. Thomas Trenchard has the lowest winning percentage of those who have coached more than one game, with .333. Of the 35 different head coaches who have led the Mountaineers, Spears, Ira Rodgers, Greasy Neale, Bowden, and Nehlen have been inducted into the College Football Hall of Fame.

== Key ==
Key to symbols in coaches list
General		Overall		Conference		Postseason (Note: Although the first Rose Bowl Game was played in 1902, it has been continuously played since the 1916 game, and is recognized as the oldest bowl game by the NCAA. "—" indicates any season prior to 1916 when postseason games were not played.)	
No.	Order of coaches (Note: A running total of the number of head coaches, with coaches who served separate tenures being counted only once. Interim head coaches are represented with "Int" and are not counted in the running total. "—" indicates the team played but either without a coach or no coach is on record. "X" indicates an interim year without play.)	GC	Games coached	CW	Conference wins	PW	Postseason wins
DC	Division championships	OW	Overall wins	CL	Conference losses	PL	Postseason losses
CC	Conference championships	OL	Overall losses	CT	Conference ties	PT	Postseason ties
NC	National championships	OT	Overall ties (Note: Overtime rules in college football were introduced in 1996, making ties impossible in the period since.)	C%	Conference winning percentage		
†	Elected to the College Football Hall of Fame	O%	Overall winning percentage (Note: When computing the win–loss percentage, a tie counts as half a win and half a loss.)				

== Coaches ==
List of head football coaches showing season(s) coached, overall records, conference records, postseason records, championships and selected awards (Note: Statistics correct as of 1/21/2026.)
No.	Name	Season(s) (Note: West Virginia did not field teams for the 1892 and 1918 seasons.)	GC	OW	OL	OT	O%	CW	CL	CT	C%	PW	PL	PT	CC	NC	Awards
1	Frederick Lincoln Emory	1891	1	0	1	0	.000	—	—	—	—	—	—	—	—	0	—
2	F. William Rane	1893–1894	7	4	3	0	0.571	—	—	—	—	—	—	—	—	0	—
3	Harry McCrory	1895	6	5	1	0	0.833	—	—	—	—	—	—	—	—	0	—
4	Thomas Trenchard	1896	12	3	7	2	0.333	—	—	—	—	—	—	—	—	0	—
5	George Krebs	1897	10	5	4	1	0.550	—	—	—	—	—	—	—	—	0	—
6	Harry Anderson	1898	7	6	1	0	0.857	—	—	—	—	—	—	—	—	0	—
7 & 9	Lewis Yeager	1899; 1901	10	5	5	0	0.500	—	—	—	—	—	—	—	—	0	—
8	John Ethan Hill	1900	7	4	3	0	0.571	—	—	—	—	—	—	—	—	0	—
10	Harold J. Davall	1902	11	7	4	0	0.636	—	—	—	—	—	—	—	—	0	—
11	Harry E. Trout	1903	8	7	1	0	0.875	—	—	—	—	—	—	—	—	0	—
12	Anthony Chez	1904	9	6	3	0	0.667	—	—	—	—	—	—	—	—	0	—
13	Carl Forkum	1905–1906	19	13	6	0	0.684	—	—	—	—	—	—	—	—	0	—
14	Clarence W. Russell	1907	10	6	4	0	0.600	—	—	—	—	—	—	—	—	0	—
15	Charles Augustus Lueder	1908–1911	33	17	13	3	0.561	—	—	—	—	—	—	—	—	0	—
16	William P. Edmunds	1912	9	6	3	0	0.667	3	0	0	1.000	—	—	—	0	0	—
17	Edwin Sweetland	1913	9	3	4	2	0.444	—	—	—	—	—	—	—	—	0	—
18	Sol Metzger	1914–1915	17	10	6	1	0.618	—	—	—	—	—	—	—	—	0	—
19	Mont McIntire	1916–1917; 1919–1920	39	24	11	4	0.667	—	—	—	—	—	—	—	—	0	—
20	Clarence Spears^{†}	1921–1924	39	30	6	3	0.808	—	—	—	—	1	0	0	—	0	—
21 & 26	Ira Rodgers^{†}	1925–1930; 1943–1945	80	41	31	8	0.563	—	—	—	—	0	0	0	—	0	—
22	Greasy Neale^{†}	1931–1933	31	12	16	3	0.435	—	—	—	—	0	0	0	—	0	—
23	Charles Tallman	1934–1936	29	15	12	2	0.552	—	—	—	—	0	0	0	—	0	—
24	Marshall Glenn	1937–1939	29	14	12	3	0.534	—	—	—	—	1	0	0	—	0	—
25 & 27	Bill Kern	1940–1942; 1946–1947	48	24	23	1	0.510	—	—	—	—	0	0	0	—	0	—
28	Dudley DeGroot	1948–1949	23	13	9	1	0.587	—	—	—	—	1	0	0	—	0	—
29	Art Lewis	1950–1959	98	58	38	2	0.602	33	9	0	0.786	0	1	0	5	0	—
30	Gene Corum	1960–1965	61	29	30	2	0.492	18	4	1	0.804	0	1	0	2	0	—
31	Jim Carlen	1966–1969	41	25	13	3	0.646	7	0	1	0.938	1	0	0	1	0	—
32	Bobby Bowden^{†}	1970–1975	68	42	26	0	0.618	—	—	—	—	1	1	0	—	0	—
33	Frank Cignetti Sr.	1976–1979	44	17	27	0	0.386	—	—	—	—	0	0	0	—	0	—
34	Don Nehlen^{†}	1980–2000	246	149	93	4	0.614	39	29	1	0.572	4	9	0	1	0	Walter Camp Coach of the Year Award (1988); Bobby Dodd Coach of the Year Award (1988); AFCA Coach of the Year (1988)
35	Rich Rodriguez	2001–2007; 2025–present	98	64	34	—	0.653	36	21	—	0.632	2	3	—	4	0	—
36	Bill Stewart	2008–2010	40	28	12	—	0.700	15	6	—	0.714	2	2	—	1	0	—
37	Dana Holgorsen	2011–2018	102	61	41	—	0.598	38	32	—	0.543	2	5	—	1	0	—
38	Neal Brown	2019–2024	72	37	35	—	0.514	25	28	—	0.472	2	1	—	0	0	—
Int.	Chad Scott (Note: Chad Scott was named interim head coach for the 2024 Frisco Bowl, following the termination of Neal Brown as head coach.)	2024	1	0	1	—	.000	0	0	—	–	0	1	—	0	0	—
