= List of Campbell Fighting Camels men's basketball head coaches =

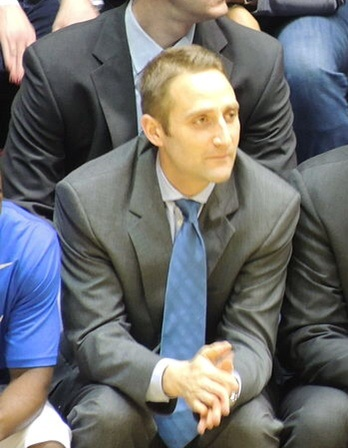
Kevin McGeehan, the current head coach of the Campbell Fighting Camels.

The following is a list of Campbell Fighting Camels basketball head coaches. There have been seven head coaches of the Fighting Camels in their 77-season history.

Campbell's current head coach is Kevin McGeehan. He was hired as the Fighting Camels' head coach in March 2013, replacing Robbie Laing, who was fired after the 2012–13 season.

No.	Tenure	Coach	Years	Record	Pct.
1	1946–1953 (Note: Records for Campbell basketball prior to 1951 are incomplete. Smith served as head coach for seven seasons, between 1946 and 1953, but the listed record only reflects the 1951–52 and 1952–53 seasons.)	Earl Smith	7	29–20	.592
2	1953–1969 (Note: McCall resigned as head coach in January 1969 to take a position as a vice president of Campbell University. Roberts was named head coach to finish the season, and remained in the job afterwards.)	Fred McCall	16	231–147	.611
3	1969–1983	Danny Roberts	15	233–178	.567
4	1983–1985	Jerry Smith	2	15–40	.273
5	1985–2003	Billy Lee	18	216–286	.430
6	2003–2013 (Note: Campbell vacated 13 wins from the 2012–13 season. Laing's on-court record is 114–185 (.381).)	Robbie Laing	10	101–185	.353
7	2013–present (Note: Campbell vacated 21 wins from the 2013–14 and 2014–15 seasons. McGeehan's on-court record is 155–164 (.486).)	Kevin McGeehan	10	134–164	.450
Totals		7 coaches	77 seasons	959–1,020	.485
Records updated through end of 2022–23 season Source
