= Mannakee =

Mannakee is a surname. Notable people with the surname include:

- Barry Mannakee (1947–1987), British police officer and bodyguard to Diana, Princess of Wales
- Nathan Mannakee (1879–1965), American college football coach
