= Fred Vail =

American football, basketball, and baseball coach (1875–1954)

Biographical details
- Born: July 31, 1875; Pennsylvania, U.S.
- Died: February 1, 1954 (aged 78); Fort Washington, Pennsylvania, U.S.
- Education: University of Pennsylvania

Coaching career (HC unless noted)

Football
- 1902: Penn (assistant)
- 1903: Richmond
- 1904–1906: Gettysburg
- 1907–1908: Earlham
- 1909–1911: Gettysburg

Basketball
- 1907–1909: Earlham
- 1908–1914: Gettysburg

Baseball
- 1908–1909: Earlham
- 1908–1911: Gettysburg

Head coaching record
- Overall: 46–31–5 (football); 52–51 (basketball); 14–25–1 (baseball)

Accomplishments and honors

Championships
- Football; 1 EVIAA (1903)

Frederick Clifton Vail (July 31, 1875 – February 1, 1954) was an American football, basketball, and baseball coach. He served as the head football coach at Richmond College—now known as the University of Richmond—in 1903, at Gettysburg College from 1904 to 1906 and again from 1909 to 1911, and at Earlham College from 1907 to 1908, compiling a career college football record of 46–31–5. At Gettysburg, Vail was also the head basketball coach from 1908 to 1914 and the head baseball coach in 1910 and 1911.

== Coaching career ==
Vail was an assistant at Germantown Academy in Philadelphia and then the University of Pennsylvania under Carl S. Williams.

Vail was the 14th head football coach at the University of Richmond in Richmond, Virginia, serving for one season, in 1903, and compiling a record of 6–3–1.

== Family and death ==
Vail was a younger brother of athlete and football coach Louis "Bucky" Vail.

Fred Vail died on February 1, 1954, in Fort Washington, Pennsylvania.

== Head coaching record ==
=== Football ===
Year	Team	Overall	Conference	Standing	Bowl/playoffs
Richmond Spiders (Eastern Virginia Intercollegiate Athletic Association) (1903)
1903	Richmond	6–3–1	3–0	1st	
Richmond:		6–3–1	3–0		
Gettysburg (Independent) (1904–1906)
1904	Gettysburg	5–3–2			
1905	Gettysburg	7–3			
1906	Gettysburg	7–1–2			
Earlham Quakers (Independent) (1907–1908)
1907	Earlham	5–3			
1908	Earlham	2–5			
Earlham:		7–8			
Gettysburg (Independent) (1909–1911)
1909	Gettysburg	4–5			
1910	Gettysburg	6–3			
1911	Gettysburg	4–5			
Gettysburg:		33–20–4			
Total:		46–31–5			
National championship Conference title Conference division title or championship game berth
