= 1903 Tampa football team =

American college football season

1903 Tampa football
- Conference: Independent
- Record: 3–2–1
- Head coach: Bobby Lynch
- Captain: Bert Steadman

The 1903 Tampa football team was an amateur American football team based in Tampa, Florida which competed during the 1903 college football season. The Tampa Football club should not be confused with the University of Tampa's football program, as the school was not established until 1933.

The Tampa team was active for several years in the early 1900s and competed against early college football squads along with amateur teams organized by military bases and other local clubs from around Florida. The club's founder and manager, local businessman J. L. Reed, was considered instrumental in bringing the game of football to Tampa.

The 1903 Tampa Football club team was coached by Bobby Lynch and posted a 3–2–1 record. The squad's colors were red and black.

The touchdown in the New Years Day game was scored by Bob Jaughin, future sheriff of Hillsborough County, Florida, during Prohibition.

== Schedule ==
Date	Time	Opponent	Site	Result	Attendance	Source
October 31	2:30 p. m.	Stetson	Tampa Bay Grounds; Tampa, FL	L 0–5		
November 3		at Jacksonville Light Infantry	Jacksonville, Florida	L 0–10		
November 26		Fort DeSoto	DeSoto Park; Tampa, FL	W 19–0	200	
December 15		Fort DeSoto	Tampa Bay Grounds; Tampa, FL	W 15–0		
December 25		East Florida Seminary	Tampa Bay Grounds; Tampa, FL	T 0–0		
January 1		East Florida Seminary	DeSoto Park; Tampa, FL	W 5–0		
All times are in Eastern time
