= George Ford (coach) =

American football player, coach, and education administrator (1871–1941)

Biographical details
- Born: January 7, 1871; Kasson, West Virginia, U.S.
- Died: August 21, 1941 (aged 70); Huntington, West Virginia, U.S.
- Education: West Virginia (1892, AB); WVU Law (1896, LLB)

Playing career

Football
- 1891: West Virginia
- 1895: West Virginia
- Position: Line

Coaching career (HC unless noted)

Football
- 1903–1904: Marshall

Baseball
- 1903–1904: Marshall

Head coaching record
- Overall: 4–4–4 (football); 3–3 (baseball)

George Michael Ford (January 7, 1871 – August 21, 1941) was an American college football player and coach and education administrator.

== Playing and coaching career ==
Ford was a member of the first football team at West Virginia University in 1891.

Ford served as the head football coach and head baseball coach from 1903 to 1904 at Marshall University in Huntington, West Virginia. He was the school's first football coach.

== Education career ==
From 1897 to 1900, Ford was the principal of Concord College, now known as Concord University, in Athens, West Virginia.

Ford was a superintendent at various school's across the state of West Virginia, including Bluefield, Beaver Pond, Brown's Creek, and Dunbar. He was also a principal at Terra Alta, Grafton, and Benwood.

Ford served as the West Virginia State Superintendent of Schools from 1921 to 1929.

== Head coaching record ==
=== Football ===
Year	Team	Overall	Conference	Standing	Bowl/playoffs
Marshall Thundering Herd (Independent) (1903–1904)
1903	Marshall	3–1–1			
1904	Marshall	1–3–3			
Marshall:		4–4–4			
Total:		4–4–4			
