= 1903 Richmond Spiders football team =

American college football season

1903 Richmond Spiders football

EVIAA champion
- Conference: Eastern Virginia Intercollegiate Athletic Association
- Record: 6–3–1 (3–0 EVIAA)
- Head coach: Fred Vail (1st season)
- Captain: Hiram M. Smith Jr.
- Home stadium: Broad Street Park

The 1903 Richmond Spiders football team was an American football team that represented Richmond College—now known as the University of Richmond—as a member of the Eastern Virginia Intercollegiate Athletic Association (EVIAA) during the 1903 college football season. Led by Fred Vail in his first and only year as head coach, Richmond compiled a record of 6–3–1.

== Schedule ==
Date	Time	Opponent	Site	Result	Attendance	Source
October 3		Petersburg YMCA*	Richmond, VA	W 38–0		
October 10		Fredericksburg College*	Broad Street Park; Richmond, VA	W 34–0		
October 19		Washington and Lee*	Broad Street Park; Richmond, VA	L 0–11	500	
October 26		Danville Military Institute*	Richmond, VA	T 6–6		
October 31		vs. Hampden–Sydney	Lafayette Field; Norfolk, VA	W 23–0		
November 7	3:30 p.m.	Columbian University*	Broad Street Park; Richmond, VA	W 22–6		
November 14		William & Mary	Broad Street Park; Richmond, VA (rivalry)	W 24–0		
November 21	3:30 p.m.	Randolph–Macon	Broad Street Park; Richmond, VA	W 16–0		
November 23		at North Carolina A&M*	Raleigh, NC	L 0–53		
November 26	4:00 p.m.	at Tulane*	Athletic Park; New Orleans, LA	L 5–18		
*Non-conference game
