= D. A. McDaniel =

American football player and coach (1876–1958)

Biographical details
- Born: January 8, 1876; Orangeville, Texas, U.S.
- Died: December 18, 1958 (aged 82); Waco, Texas, U.S.

Playing career
- 1900: Texas

Coaching career (HC unless noted)
- 1903: Arkansas

Head coaching record
- Overall: 3–4

David Albert McDaniel (January 8, 1876 – December 18, 1958) was an American college football player and coach. He served as the head football coach at the University of Arkansas in 1903, compiling a record of 3–4.

Born in 1876 to Lewis Tillman and Cornelia (née Stuart) McDaniel, he was an alumnus of the University of Texas where he was the starting center of the Texas' team that went undefeated and won the title of Champions of the Southwest in 1900. He was later a lawyer and teacher, based in Waco. He died there in 1958.

== Head coaching record ==
Year	Team	Overall	Conference	Standing	Bowl/playoffs
Arkansas Cardinals (Independent) (1903)
1903	Arkansas	3–4			
Arkansas:		3–4			
Total:		3–4			
