= William Devlin =

William Devlin may refer to:

- William Devlin (actor) (1911–1987), Scottish actor
- William Devlin (footballer, born 1891), English footballer (Stockport County, Cardiff City, Newport County)
- William Devlin (footballer, born 1899) (1899–1972), Scottish footballer (Cowdenbeath FC, Huddersfield Town, Liverpool FC, Heart of Midlothian)
- William Devlin (footballer, born 1931), Scottish footballer (Carlisle United)
- William J. Devlin (1875–1938), American Jesuit and academic administrator
- Bill Devlin (born c. 1947), American politician (North Dakota representative)
- Billy Devlin, swimmer from Northern Ireland
