= Nathan Mannakee =

American football coach (1879–1965)

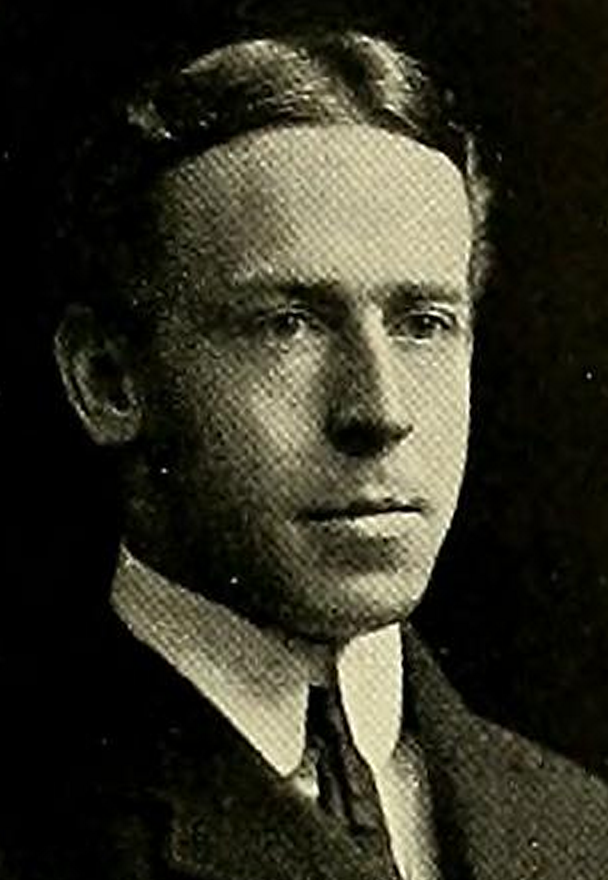
- Mannakee pictured in Halcyon 1903, Swarthmore yearbook

Biographical details
- Born: February 14, 1879; Baltimore, Maryland, U.S.
- Died: July 9, 1965 (aged 86); Ashton, Maryland, U.S.
- Education: Swarthmore College

Coaching career (HC unless noted)
- 1903–1905: Delaware

Head coaching record
- Overall: 8–7–1

Nathan Haines Mannakee (February 14, 1879 – July 9, 1965) was an American college football coach who was Delaware football program's fourth head coach. He led them to an 8–13–2 overall record between 1903 and 1905. He married Sarah Nelson Dale.

== Head coaching record ==
Year	Team	Overall	Conference	Standing	Bowl/playoffs
Delaware (Independent) (1903–1905)
1903	Delaware	4–4			
1904	Delaware	1–5–1			
1905	Delaware	3–4–1			
Delaware:		8–13–2			
Total:		8–13–2			
