= Harry E. Trout =

American football coach

Biographical details
- Born: April 4, 1876; Lykens, Pennsylvania, U.S.
- Died: January 11, 1941 (aged 64); Johnstown, Pennsylvania, U.S.
- Education: Lafayette College

Coaching career (HC unless noted)
- 1903: West Virginia

Head coaching record
- Overall: 7–1

Accomplishments and honors

Awards
- Third-team All-American (1899)

Harry Edgar Trout (April 4, 1876 – January 11, 1941) was an American college football coach. He serve as the ninth head football coach at West Virginia University in Morgantown, West Virginia and he held that position for the 1903 season. His coaching record at West Virginia was 7–1.

Trout was the first coach at West Virginia to record a victory over rival Washington and Jefferson with a 6–0 win on November 26, 1903. The game marked not only the first victory over Washington and Jefferson, but the first time after nine attempts West Virginia had managed to score against the "Presidents".

Trout graduated from Lafayette College in 1903 and married Jane McBride of Portland, Oregon in January 1913 at Chicago. Trout later worked for a steel company in Pennsylvania. From 1936 to 1938 he served on the Lafayette College board of trustees. He died January 11, 1941, in Johnstown and was buried in Granview Cemetery in that city.

== Head coaching record ==
Year	Team	Overall	Conference	Standing	Bowl/playoffs
West Virginia Mountaineers (Independent) (1903)
1903	West Virginia	7–1			
West Virginia:		7–1			
Total:		7–1			
