= Leah McCall Devlin =

American academic

Leah McCall Devlin (born August 10, 1954) is a professor in the Department of Health Policy and Management at the UNC Gillings School of Global Public Health.

The daughter of Fred and Pearle McCall, Devlin was born in Harnett County, North Carolina. She attended Buies Creek School, where she played basketball.

A dentist by training, she was the Wake County Health Director for ten years and the State Health Director for North Carolina, also for ten years.

In 2019, she was named the Chair of the CDC Foundation's Board of Directors.

Devilin has been a consultant to the Aspen Institute, the Milbank Memorial Fund, and RTI International.

Devlin is married to Joseph Devlin. They have one son.

== Education ==
- MPH, Public Health, University of North Carolina at Chapel Hill, 1984
- DDS, Dentistry, University of North Carolina at Chapel Hill, 1979
- BS, Dentistry, University of North Carolina at Chapel Hill, 1976
