= R. N. Watts =

American football and baseball coach (1873–1945)

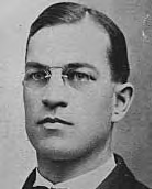

Biographical details
- Born: February 3, 1873; Bowling Green, Virginia, U.S.
- Died: December 3, 1945 (aged 72); Fort Hood, Texas, U.S.
- Education: VAMC (1898)

Playing career
- 1894–1895: VAMC
- Positions: Tackle, end

Coaching career (HC unless noted)

Football
- 1901: Austin
- 1903: Baylor

Baseball
- 1903–1904: Baylor

Head coaching record
- Overall: 13–18 (baseball)

Richard Nottingham Watts (February 3, 1873 – December 3, 1945) was an American college football and college baseball coach. He served as the fourth head football coach at Baylor University, coaching in 1903 and compiling a record of 4–3–1. Watts was also the second head baseball coach at Baylor, coaching from 1903 to 1904 and tallying a mark of 13–18. He was an alumnus of the Virginia Polytechnic Institute, where he had played football previously. He later worked for the United States Geological Survey.

== Head coaching record ==
=== Football ===
Year	Team	Overall	Conference	Standing	Bowl/playoffs
Austin Kangaroos (Independent) (1901)
1901	Austin				
Austin:					
Baylor (Independent) (1903)
1903	Baylor	4–3–1			
Baylor:		4–3–1			
Total:					
