= Ben Devlin =

Ben Devlin may refer to:

- Ben Devlin (producer), British television producer
- Ben Devlin (racing driver) (born 1982), British racing driver
