= Fred McCall =

American basketball coach and administrator (1928–2008)

Fred G. McCall, Jr. (August 12, 1923 – March 28, 2008) was the head basketball coach at Campbell University in Buies Creek, North Carolina from 1953 to 1969. He later served as an administrator of the University. Along with Bones McKinney, he co-founded the first basketball school at Campbell in 1956, which later featured instructors such as John Wooden. McCall also invented the McCall Rebounder as a practice tool for basketball.

McCall was the father of Leah McCall Devlin.
