= Charles Augustus Lueder =

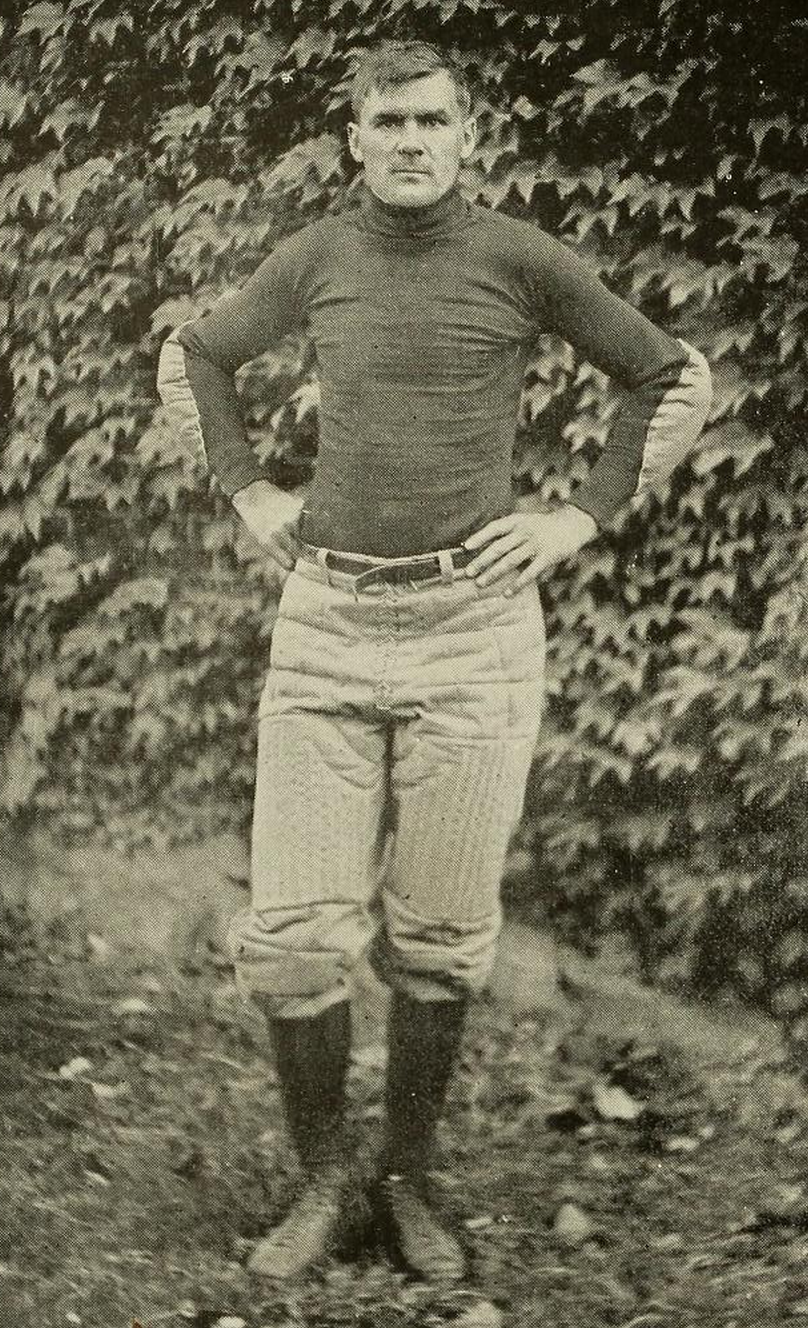
- Lueder pictured in The Monticola, West Virginia yearbook

Biographical details
- Born: May 30, 1878; Luzerne County, Pennsylvania, U.S.
- Died: August 14, 1954 (aged 76); Jacksonville, New York, U.S.

Playing career
- 1898, 1900–1902: Cornell
- Position: Left tackle

Coaching career (HC unless noted)
- 1903: VPI
- 1904–1907: Cornell (assistant)
- 1908–1911: West Virginia

Head coaching record
- Overall: 22–14–3

Charles Augustus Lueder (May 30, 1878 – August 14, 1954) was an American head coach in both rowing and college football. He was a native of Wilkes-Barre, Pennsylvania, and was known as a talented athlete while attending Cornell University.

== Cornell ==
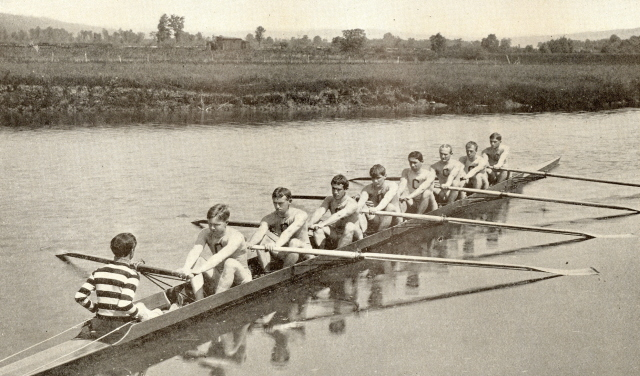
1901 Cornell Varsity 8 oared Rowing Team - Lueder is 5th from the left

Lueder graduated from Cornell University with a Doctor of Veterinary Medicine in 1902. He was one of the first students to excel in three varsity sports there, competing under three legendary coaches: football under Glenn Scobey Warner, track under Jack Moakley, and crew under Charles E. Courtney. His undergraduate success led to his membership in the Quill and Dagger society.

Lueder was at that time considered one of the strongest athletes Cornell had ever developed. In 1901, Lueder was part of Cornell’s world-record-setting varsity eight at the Intercollegiate Rowing Association Championship Regatta in Poughkeepsie, New York. This crew broke the world record for a four-mile course with a time of 18 minutes, 53 1/3 seconds. In 1956, he was an inaugural inductee into the National Rowing Hall of Fame.

== Coaching career ==
After graduation, Lueder served as head football coach at Virginia Agricultural and Mechanical College and Polytechnic Institute (VPI)—now known as Virginia Tech. Lueder was also approached by Syracuse University to coach their football team. He went to Syracuse to look over the facilities and talk to their representatives. He considered both propositions but accepted Virginal Tech.

The next year, he returned to Cornell as assistant coach of football under Warner and assistant coach of rowing under Courtney. He later became head football coach at West Virginia University (1908–1911), but returned again to Cornell as head crew coach for two seasons (1924–1926).

== Head coaching record ==
=== Football ===
Year	Team	Overall	Conference	Standing	Bowl/playoffs
VPI (Independent) (1903)
1903	VPI	5–1			
VPI:		5–1			
West Virginia Mountaineers (Independent) (1908–1911)
1908	West Virginia	5–3			
1909	West Virginia	4–3–2			
1910	West Virginia	2–4–1			
1911	West Virginia	6–3			
West Virginia:		17–13–3			
Total:		22–14–3			
