= 1903 TCU football team =

American college football season

1903 TCU football
- Conference: Independent
- Record: 0–7
- Head coach: None

1903 Southern college football independents records
	Conf.			Overall
Team	W	L	T	W		L		T
Livingstone		–		3	–	0	–	0
Kentucky University		–		7	–	1	–	0
West Virginia		–		7	–	1	–	0
VPI		–		5	–	1	–	0
South Carolina		–		8	–	2	–	0
Stetson		–		2	–	1	–	1
Virginia		–		7	–	2	–	1
Georgetown		–		7	–	3	–	0
VMI		–		2	–	1	–	0
Texas A&M		–		7	–	3	–	1
North Carolina		–		6	–	3	–	0
Maryland		–		7	–	4	–	0
East Florida Seminary		–		3	–	2	–	1
Florida State College		–		3	–	2	–	1
Oklahoma		–		5	–	4	–	3
Kendall		–		3	–	3	–	0
Louisiana Industrial		–		1	–	1	–	0
North Carolina A&M		–		4	–	4	–	0
Oklahoma A&M		–		0	–	0	–	2
Southwestern Louisiana Industrial		–		1	–	1	–	0
Tusculum		–		1	–	1	–	0
Arkansas		–		3	–	4	–	0
Navy		–		4	–	7	–	1
Howard (AL)		–		2	–	3	–	0
Columbian		–		2	–	5	–	0
Florida		–		1	–	3	–	0
Goldey College		–		0	–	1	–	1
Davidson		–		1	–	4	–	0
Tennessee Docs		–		0	–	4	–	0
TCU		–		0	–	7	–	0

The 1903 TCU football team represented Texas Christian University (TCU) as an independent during the 1903 college football season. TCU finished the season 0–7 overall. They played their home games in Waco, Texas.

== Schedule ==
Date	Opponent	Site	Result	Source
October 3	Baylor	Waco, TX (rivalry)	L 0–12	
October 17	at Daniel Baker	Brownwood, TX	L 5–10	
October 24	at Trinity (TX)	Waxahachie, TX	L 0–30	
November 14	at Texas A&M	College Station, TX (rivalry)	L 0–16	
November 21	Texas A&M	Waco, TX	L 0–11	
November 26	Baylor	Waco, TX	L 0–4	
November 28	at Texas A&M	College Station, TX	L 6–14	
