= 1903 VPI football team =

American college football season

1903 VPI football
- Conference: Independent
- Record: 5–1
- Head coach: Charles Augustus Lueder (1st season)
- Captain: Sally Miles
- Home stadium: Gibboney Field

1903 Southern college football independents records
	Conf.			Overall
Team	W	L	T	W		L		T
Livingstone		–		3	–	0	–	0
Kentucky University		–		7	–	1	–	0
West Virginia		–		7	–	1	–	0
VPI		–		5	–	1	–	0
South Carolina		–		8	–	2	–	0
Stetson		–		2	–	1	–	1
Virginia		–		7	–	2	–	1
Georgetown		–		7	–	3	–	0
VMI		–		2	–	1	–	0
Texas A&M		–		7	–	3	–	1
North Carolina		–		6	–	3	–	0
Maryland		–		7	–	4	–	0
East Florida Seminary		–		3	–	2	–	1
Florida State College		–		3	–	2	–	1
Oklahoma		–		5	–	4	–	3
Kendall		–		3	–	3	–	0
Louisiana Industrial		–		1	–	1	–	0
North Carolina A&M		–		4	–	4	–	0
Oklahoma A&M		–		0	–	0	–	2
Southwestern Louisiana Industrial		–		1	–	1	–	0
Tusculum		–		1	–	1	–	0
Arkansas		–		3	–	4	–	0
Navy		–		4	–	7	–	1
Howard (AL)		–		2	–	3	–	0
Columbian		–		2	–	5	–	0
Florida		–		1	–	3	–	0
Goldey College		–		0	–	1	–	1
Davidson		–		1	–	4	–	0
Tennessee Docs		–		0	–	4	–	0
TCU		–		0	–	7	–	0

The 1903 VPI football team represented Virginia Agricultural and Mechanical College and Polytechnic Institute in the 1903 college football season. The team was led by head coach Charles Augustus Lueder and finished with a record of five wins and one loss (5–1).

== Schedule ==
Date	Time	Opponent	Site	Result	Attendance	Source
October 13		St. Albans Lutheran Boys School	Gibboney Field; Blacksburg, VA	W 29–0		
October 17		North Carolina A&M	Gibboney Field; Blacksburg, VA	W 21–0		
October 24	3:15 p.m.	vs. Virginia	Broad Street Park; Richmond, VA (rivalry)	L 0–21	4,000	
November 7	3:20 p.m.	vs. North Carolina	Lafayette Field; Norfolk, VA	W 21–0	2,000	
November 21		at Navy	Worden Field; Annapolis, MD	W 11–0		
November 26	3:00 p.m.	vs. Davidson	Athletic Park; Roanoke, VA	W 26–0	1,200–1,500	

== Before the season ==
The 1902 VPI football team compiled a 3–2–1 record and were led by R. R. Brown in his only season as head coach.

== Game summaries ==
=== St. Albans ===
St. Albans vs. VPI

Team	1	2	Total
St. Albans	0	0	0
• VPI	23	6	29

- Date: October 13, 1903
- Location: Gibboney Field
  Blacksburg, VA
- Referee: R. R. Brown

VPI's first game of the season was a victory over St. Albans Lutheran Boys School at Gibboney Field.

The starting lineup for VPI was: Robins (left end), Willson (left tackle), Walsh (left guard), Stiles (center), Abbott (right guard), Miles (right tackle), Schaefer (right end), Carpenter (quarterback), Byrd (left halfback), Hodgson (right halfback), Counselman (fullback). The substitutes were: Brent, Fiveash, Gray, Lewis, Norfleet and Tinsley.

The starting lineup for St. Albans was: Lawrence Page (left end), Melville Melendy (left tackle), Ira Seley (left guard), Ewing Lawson (center), Mack Scott (right guard), James Baird (right tackle), James Barry (right end), Fitzhugh Venable (quarterback), Ingalls (left halfback), M. Carter Hall (right halfback), H. Cabell Maddux (fullback).

=== North Carolina A&M ===
North Carolina A&M vs. VPI

Team	1	2	Total
NC A&M	0	0	0
• VPI	16	5	21

- Date: October 17, 1903
- Location: Gibboney Field
  Blacksburg, VA
- Referee: Art Devlin

After their victory over St. Albans, VPI played the North Carolina A&M at Gibboney Field.

The starting lineup for VPI was: Robins (left end), Willson (left tackle), Walsh (left guard), Stiles (center), Abbott (right guard), Miles (right tackle), Schaefer (right end), Carpenter (quarterback), Byrd (left halfback), Hodgson (right halfback), Counselman (fullback). The substitutes were: Brent and Tinsley.

The starting lineup for North Carolina A&M was: Lykes (left end), J. H. Koon (left tackle), LeRoy Abernethy (left guard), Edgar Gaither (center), R. G. Wilson (right guard), V. L. Neal (right tackle), Joseph Gulley (right end), T. R. Buckley (quarterback), Ward Shannonhouse (left halfback), C. D. Welch (right halfback), Joseph Miller (fullback). The substitutes were: S. W. Asbury, Arthur Gregory, Fred Hadley and Charles Seifert.

=== Virginia ===
Virginia vs. VPI

Team	1	2	Total
• UVA	15	6	21
VPI	0	0	0

- Date: October 24, 1903
- Location: Broad Street Park
  Richmond, VA
- Game start: 3:15 p.m.
- Game attendance: 4,000
- Referee: M. J. Thompson (Georgetown)

The starting lineup for VPI was: Robins (left end), Willson (left tackle), Walsh (left guard), Stiles (center), Abbott (right guard), Miles (right tackle), Lewis (right end), Bear (quarterback), Byrd (left halfback), Hodgson (right halfback), Counselman (fullback). The substitute was Schaefer.

The starting lineup for Virginia was: George Hull (left end), David McColl (left tackle), James C. Elmer (left guard), Clyde R. Conner (center), William Spates (right guard), Walter Council (right tackle), Merritt Cooke Jr. (right end), John Beverly Pollard (quarterback), Wistar Heald (left halfback), Harry Wall (right halfback), Thomas Watkins (fullback). The substitutes were: George Zinn.

=== North Carolina ===
North Carolina vs. VPI

Team	1	2	Total
UNC	0	0	0
• VPI	15	6	21

- Date: November 7, 1903
- Location: Lafayette Field
  Norfolk, VA
- Game start: 3:20 p.m.
- Game attendance: 2,000
- Referee: Bill Armstrong

The starting lineup for VPI was: Robins (left end), Willson (left tackle), Walsh (left guard), Stiles (center), Abbott (right guard), Miles (right tackle), Lewis (right end), Bear (quarterback), Byrd (left halfback), Carpenter (right halfback), Counselman (fullback). The substitute was Hodgson.

The starting lineup for North Carolina was: Frank Foust (left end), J. Donnelly (left tackle), Perry (left guard), Roach Stewart (center), Charles Albright (right guard), George Jones (right tackle), Albert Lyman Cox (right end), Engle (quarterback), Green Berkeley (left halfback), J. E. Mann (right halfback), Addison Hester (fullback). The substitutes were: Wright.

=== Navy ===
VPI at Navy

Team	1	2	Total
• VPI	6	5	11
Navy	0	0	0

- Date: November 21, 1903
- Location: Worden Field
  Annapolis, MD

The starting lineup for VPI was: Robins (left end), Willson (left tackle), Walsh (left guard), Stiles (center), Abbott (right guard), Miles (right tackle), Lewis (right end), Bear (quarterback), Byrd (left halfback), Carpenter (right halfback), Counselman (fullback).

The starting lineup for Navy was: Douglas Howard (left end), Ronan Grady (left tackle), Henry Chambers (left guard), Albert Rees (center), Edson Oak (right guard), William Piersol (right tackle), Charles Soule (right end), John Wilcox (quarterback), Ralph Strassburger (left halfback), Jonathan Dowell (right halfback), William Halsey (fullback). The substitutes were: Clay and Reichmuth.

=== Davidson ===
Davidson vs. VPI

Team	1	2	Total
Davidson	0	0	0
• VPI	16	10	26

- Date: November 26, 1903
- Location: Athletic Park
  Roanoke, VA
- Game start: 3:00 p.m.
- Game attendance: 1,200–1,500
- Game weather: "cold"
- Referee: R. R. Brown (1st half), Allen, Davidson (2nd half)

The starting lineup for VPI was: Robins (left end), Willson (left tackle), Walsh (left guard), Stiles (center), Abbott (right guard), Miles (right tackle), Lewis (right end), Bear (quarterback), Byrd (left halfback), Carpenter (right halfback), Counselman (fullback). The substitutes were: Brent and Dean.

The starting lineup for Davidson was: T. J. Hutchinson (left end), John Gibson (left tackle), Sloop (left guard), Clarence Lentz (center), Robert Smallwood (right guard), R. E. Whitaker (right tackle), William Fetzer (right end), William Vardell (quarterback), E. L. McCallie (left halfback), M. L. McKinnon (right halfback), Hamilton McKay (fullback).

== Players ==
The following players were members of the 1903 football team according to the roster published in the 1904 edition of The Bugle, the Virginia Tech yearbook.

VPI 1903 roster
Quarterback: Charles Edgar Bear; Guards: Alvin Lee Abbott; Walsh; Tackles: Sally Miles (Capt.); George Cralle Willson; Center: Joseph Clay Stiles	Ends: Wilmer Nelson Robins; Thomas Walker Lewis; Halfbacks: Clarence Byrd; Hunter Carpenter; Fullback: John Counselman	Substitutes: Thomas Newton Brent; William Harper Dean; Robert Walton Fiveash; Gray; Murray Valentine Harlan; Herbert David Hodgson; Norfleet; Charles Martin Schafer; Robert Bruce Tinsley

== Coaching and training staff ==
- Head coach: Charles Augustus Lueder
- Assistant coach: R. R. Brown
- Manager: Guy Aubrey Chalkley
- Assistant managers
  - Frank Marshall Yost
  - Robert Stuart Royer
