= Art Devlin (baseball) =

American baseball player (1879–1948)

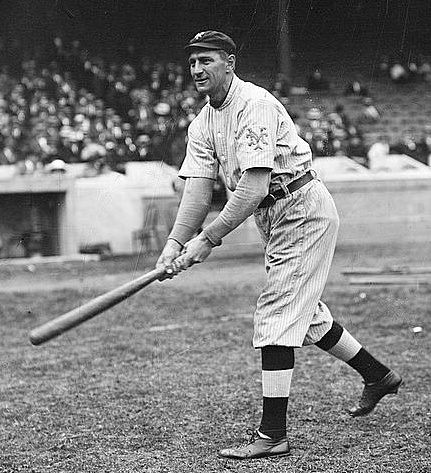
- Third baseman
- Born: October 16, 1879; Washington, D.C., U.S.
- Died: September 18, 1948 (aged 68); Jersey City, New Jersey, U.S.
- Batted: Right Threw: Right

MLB debut
- April 14, 1904, for the New York Giants

Last MLB appearance
- August 25, 1913, for the Boston Braves

MLB statistics
- Batting average: .269
- Home runs: 10
- Runs batted in: 508
- Stats at Baseball Reference

Teams
- New York Giants (1904–1911); Boston Braves (1912–1913)

Career highlights and awards
- World Series champion (1905); NL stolen base leader (1905)

Arthur McArthur Devlin (October 16, 1879 – September 18, 1948) was an American athlete and coach. He is most known for his Major League Baseball career from 1904 to 1913.

== College career ==
Devlin attended Georgetown University in Washington, D.C., where he played baseball and football. As a senior in 1900, he served as the team captain. He was a standout back, and in 1900 was considered competitive for the Walter Camp All-American team if it had not been restricted to Harvard, Yale, and Princeton players.

== Coaching career ==
He served as the head football coach at North Carolina A&M, now North Carolina State, for the 1902 and 1903 seasons. During that time, Devlin's teams compiled a 7–8–2 record for a winning percentage of .471.

In the early 1920s, Devlin served as the head baseball coach at Fordham University.

In the late 1920s, Devlin served as a basketball coach at the Naval Academy.

== Baseball career ==
Devlin spent most of his nine-year baseball career with the New York Giants, where he started as their third baseman in 1904. In 1905 Devlin stole 59 bases, sharing the National League lead with Billy Maloney of the Chicago Cubs. Devlin was traded to the Boston Braves in 1911, where he played for two years as a backup infielder until his retirement in 1913. Devlin had a short temper and on one occasion in 1910, jumped into the grandstand at the Polo Grounds to beat up a fan who called him a "dog".

In 1313 games over 10 seasons, Devlin posted a .269 batting average (1185-for-4412) with 603 runs, 10 home runs, 508 RBI and 285 stolen bases. Defensively, he recorded a .946 fielding percentage.

Devlin died in Jersey City, New Jersey a month before his 69th birthday.

== Head coaching record ==
=== Football ===
Year	Team	Overall	Conference	Standing	Bowl/playoffs
North Carolina A&M Aggies (Independent) (1902–1903)
1902	North Carolina A&M	3–4–2			
1903	North Carolina A&M	4–4			
North Carolina A&M:		7–8–2			
Total:		7–8–2			

== See also ==
- List of Major League Baseball annual stolen base leaders
