= 1903 Maryland Aggies football team =

American college football season

1903 Maryland Aggies football
- Conference: Independent
- Record: 7–4
- Head coach: D. John Markey (2nd season)
- Home stadium: Maryland Agricultural College Field

1903 Southern college football independents records
| | Conf. | | | Overall |
| Team | W | L | T | W | | L | | T |
|---|---|---|---|---|---|---|---|---|
| Livingstone | | – | | 3 | – | 0 | – | 0 |
| Kentucky University | | – | | 7 | – | 1 | – | 0 |
| West Virginia | | – | | 7 | – | 1 | – | 0 |
| VPI | | – | | 5 | – | 1 | – | 0 |
| South Carolina | | – | | 8 | – | 2 | – | 0 |
| Stetson | | – | | 2 | – | 1 | – | 1 |
| Virginia | | – | | 7 | – | 2 | – | 1 |
| Georgetown | | – | | 7 | – | 3 | – | 0 |
| VMI | | – | | 2 | – | 1 | – | 0 |
| Texas A&M | | – | | 7 | – | 3 | – | 1 |
| North Carolina | | – | | 6 | – | 3 | – | 0 |
| Maryland | | – | | 7 | – | 4 | – | 0 |
| East Florida Seminary | | – | | 3 | – | 2 | – | 1 |
| Florida State College | | – | | 3 | – | 2 | – | 1 |
| Oklahoma | | – | | 5 | – | 4 | – | 3 |
| Kendall | | – | | 3 | – | 3 | – | 0 |
| Louisiana Industrial | | – | | 1 | – | 1 | – | 0 |
| North Carolina A&M | | – | | 4 | – | 4 | – | 0 |
| Oklahoma A&M | | – | | 0 | – | 0 | – | 2 |
| Southwestern Louisiana Industrial | | – | | 1 | – | 1 | – | 0 |
| Tusculum | | – | | 1 | – | 1 | – | 0 |
| Arkansas | | – | | 3 | – | 4 | – | 0 |
| Navy | | – | | 4 | – | 7 | – | 1 |
| Howard (AL) | | – | | 2 | – | 3 | – | 0 |
| Columbian | | – | | 2 | – | 5 | – | 0 |
| Florida | | – | | 1 | – | 3 | – | 0 |
| Goldey College | | – | | 0 | – | 1 | – | 1 |
| Davidson | | – | | 1 | – | 4 | – | 0 |
| Tennessee Docs | | – | | 0 | – | 4 | – | 0 |
| TCU | | – | | 0 | – | 7 | – | 0 |

The 1903 Maryland Aggies football team represented Maryland Agricultural College (later part of the University of Maryland) in the 1903 college football season. In their second season under head coach D. John Markey, the Aggies compiled a 7–4 record and outscored their opponents, 104 to 64.

== Schedule ==
| Date | Opponent | Site | Result | Source |
|---|---|---|---|---|
| September 26 | at Georgetown | Georgetown Field; Washington, DC | L 0–28 | |
| October 3 | Clifton Athletic Club | College Park, MD | W 5–0 | |
| October 7 | Gunton Temple Church | College Park, MD | W 21–0 | |
| October 10 | Washington College | College Park, MD | W 28–0 | |
| October 17 | at St. John's (MD) | Annapolis, MD | L 0–18 | |
| October 28 | Washington Technical High School | College Park, MD | W 27–0 | |
| October 31 | at Columbian | Van Ness Field; Washington, DC | W 6–0 | |
| November 7 | at Mount St. Mary's | Emmitsburg, MD | L 0–2 | |
| November 14 | Western Maryland | College Park, MD | W 6–0 | |
| November 21 | University of Maryland, Baltimore | College Park, MD | W 11–0 | |
| November 26 | at Delaware | Front and Union Streets gridiron; Wilmington, DE | L 0–16 | |
