= 1903 Texas A&M Aggies football team =

American college football season

1903 Texas A&M Aggies football
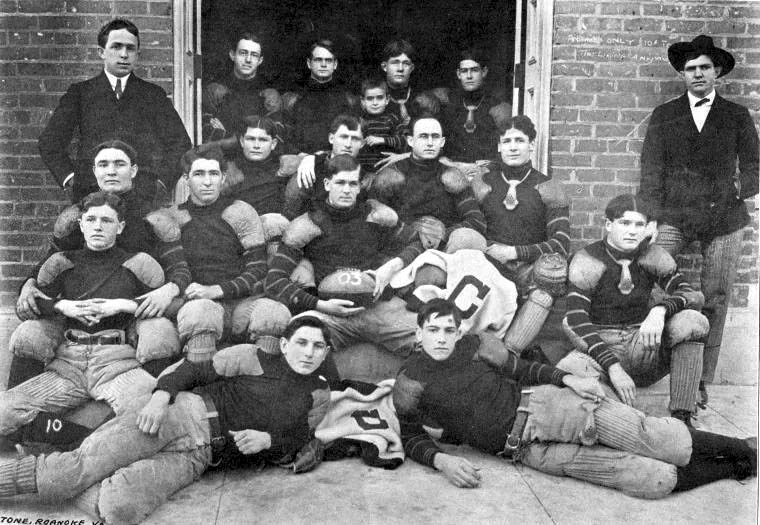
- Conference: Independent
- Record: 7–3–1
- Head coach: J. E. Platt (2nd season)

1903 Southern college football independents records
	Conf.			Overall
Team	W	L	T	W		L		T
Livingstone		–		3	–	0	–	0
Kentucky University		–		7	–	1	–	0
West Virginia		–		7	–	1	–	0
VPI		–		5	–	1	–	0
South Carolina		–		8	–	2	–	0
Stetson		–		2	–	1	–	1
Virginia		–		7	–	2	–	1
Georgetown		–		7	–	3	–	0
VMI		–		2	–	1	–	0
Texas A&M		–		7	–	3	–	1
North Carolina		–		6	–	3	–	0
Maryland		–		7	–	4	–	0
East Florida Seminary		–		3	–	2	–	1
Florida State College		–		3	–	2	–	1
Oklahoma		–		5	–	4	–	3
Kendall		–		3	–	3	–	0
Louisiana Industrial		–		1	–	1	–	0
North Carolina A&M		–		4	–	4	–	0
Oklahoma A&M		–		0	–	0	–	2
Southwestern Louisiana Industrial		–		1	–	1	–	0
Tusculum		–		1	–	1	–	0
Arkansas		–		3	–	4	–	0
Navy		–		4	–	7	–	1
Howard (AL)		–		2	–	3	–	0
Columbian		–		2	–	5	–	0
Florida		–		1	–	3	–	0
Goldey College		–		0	–	1	–	1
Davidson		–		1	–	4	–	0
Tennessee Docs		–		0	–	4	–	0
TCU		–		0	–	7	–	0

The 1903 Texas A&M Aggies football team represented the Agricultural and Mechanical College of Texas—now known as Texas A&M University—as an independent during the 1903 college football season. Led by second-year head coach J. E. Platt, the Aggies compiled a record of 7–3–1.

== Schedule ==
Date	Opponent	Site	Result	Source
October 3	Trinity (TX)	College Station, TX	W 16–0	
October 10	TCU	College Station, TX	W 14–6	
October 19	Oklahoma	Bryan, TX	L 0–6	
October 26	at Trinity (TX)	Waxahachie, TX	L 0–18	
October 31	vs. Arkansas	Houston, TX (rivalry)	W 6–0	
November 7	at Baylor	Waco, TX (rivalry)	T 0–0	
November 14	at Baylor	Waco, TX	W 16–0	
November 14	TCU	College Station, TX	W 16–0	
November 21	at TCU	Waco, TX (rivalry)	W 11–0	
November 21	Baylor	College Station, TX	W 5–0	
November 26	at Texas	Varsity Athletic Field; Austin, TX (rivalry)	L 6–29	
