= 1903 East Florida Seminary football team =

College football team

1903 East Florida Seminary football
- Conference: Independent
- Record: 3–2–1
- Head coach: Bob Kennedy
- Home stadium: The Ballpark

1903 Southern college football independents records
	Conf.			Overall
Team	W	L	T	W		L		T
Livingstone		–		3	–	0	–	0
Kentucky University		–		7	–	1	–	0
West Virginia		–		7	–	1	–	0
VPI		–		5	–	1	–	0
South Carolina		–		8	–	2	–	0
Stetson		–		2	–	1	–	1
Virginia		–		7	–	2	–	1
Georgetown		–		7	–	3	–	0
VMI		–		2	–	1	–	0
Texas A&M		–		7	–	3	–	1
North Carolina		–		6	–	3	–	0
Maryland		–		7	–	4	–	0
East Florida Seminary		–		3	–	2	–	1
Florida State College		–		3	–	2	–	1
Oklahoma		–		5	–	4	–	3
Kendall		–		3	–	3	–	0
Louisiana Industrial		–		1	–	1	–	0
North Carolina A&M		–		4	–	4	–	0
Oklahoma A&M		–		0	–	0	–	2
Southwestern Louisiana Industrial		–		1	–	1	–	0
Tusculum		–		1	–	1	–	0
Arkansas		–		3	–	4	–	0
Navy		–		4	–	7	–	1
Howard (AL)		–		2	–	3	–	0
Columbian		–		2	–	5	–	0
Florida		–		1	–	3	–	0
Goldey College		–		0	–	1	–	1
Davidson		–		1	–	4	–	0
Tennessee Docs		–		0	–	4	–	0
TCU		–		0	–	7	–	0

The 1903 East Florida Seminary football team represented the East Florida Seminary in Gainesville, Florida in the sport of American football during the 1903 college football season. This was not the modern Florida Gators of the University of Florida, which began in 1906, but one of its four predecessor institutions. The team split two games with the University of Florida at Lake City, defeated in-state rivals Florida State College and Stetson by identical scores of 16 to 0, then wrapped up the campaign with a tie and a loss to an amateur squad from Tampa.

Seminary player-coach Robert Kennedy reportedly left town with $91 in gate receipts after the contest in Tampa on Christmas Day, leaving the rest of the team scrambling to pay their hotel bill. The controversy was rectified in time for the teams' rematch on New Years Day, in which Kennedy was again Seminary's starting quarterback.

== Schedule ==
Date	Opponent	Site	Result	Attendance	Source
	University of Florida (Lake City)		W		
	University of Florida (Lake City)		L		
October 31	at Florida State College	Tallahassee, FL	W 16–0		
November 13	Stetson		W 16–0		
December 25	at Tampa	Tampa Bay Grounds; Tampa, FL	T 0–0	600	
January 1	at Tampa	DeSoto Park; Tampa, FL	L 0–5		
