= 1903 Florida State College football team =

American college football season

1903 Florida State College football
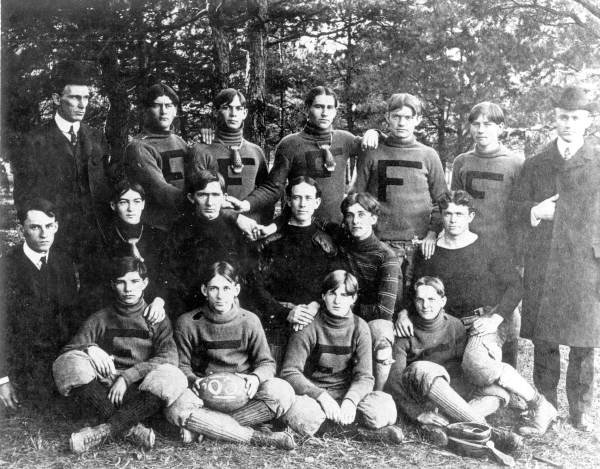

State champion
- Conference: Independent
- Record: 3–2–1
- Head coach: W. W. Hughes (2nd season)
- Captain: Ed Watson

1903 Southern college football independents records
	Conf.			Overall
Team	W	L	T	W		L		T
Livingstone		–		3	–	0	–	0
Kentucky University		–		7	–	1	–	0
West Virginia		–		7	–	1	–	0
VPI		–		5	–	1	–	0
South Carolina		–		8	–	2	–	0
Stetson		–		2	–	1	–	1
Virginia		–		7	–	2	–	1
Georgetown		–		7	–	3	–	0
VMI		–		2	–	1	–	0
Texas A&M		–		7	–	3	–	1
North Carolina		–		6	–	3	–	0
Maryland		–		7	–	4	–	0
East Florida Seminary		–		3	–	2	–	1
Florida State College		–		3	–	2	–	1
Oklahoma		–		5	–	4	–	3
Kendall		–		3	–	3	–	0
Louisiana Industrial		–		1	–	1	–	0
North Carolina A&M		–		4	–	4	–	0
Oklahoma A&M		–		0	–	0	–	2
Southwestern Louisiana Industrial		–		1	–	1	–	0
Tusculum		–		1	–	1	–	0
Arkansas		–		3	–	4	–	0
Navy		–		4	–	7	–	1
Howard (AL)		–		2	–	3	–	0
Columbian		–		2	–	5	–	0
Florida		–		1	–	3	–	0
Goldey College		–		0	–	1	–	1
Davidson		–		1	–	4	–	0
Tennessee Docs		–		0	–	4	–	0
TCU		–		0	–	7	–	0

The 1903 Florida State College football team represented Florida State College in the sport of American football during the 1903 college football season. The team was led by head coach W.W. Hughes and posted a 3–2–1 record and won a claim to the State Championship. With no formal nickname or mascot, the Florida State College football team was known simply as the "Florida State College Eleven".

== Schedule ==
Date	Opponent	Site	Result
October 16	Bainbridge Giants	Tallahassee, FL	W 22–0
October 23	at Bainbridge Giants	Bainbridge, GA	W 5–0
October 31	East Florida Seminary	Tallahassee, FL	L 0–16
November 7	at Georgia Tech	Piedmont Park; Atlanta, GA	L 0–17
November 13	University of Florida (Lake City)	Tallahassee, FL	W 12–0
November 26	at Stetson	DeLand, FL	T 5–5

== Roster ==
The original line-up played the entire game, both offense and defense.

=== Line ===
- LE –
- LT –
- LG –
- C –
- RG –
- RT –
- RE –

=== Backfield ===
- QB –
- LH –
- RH –
- FB –
