= 1903 Tennessee Docs football team =

American college football season

1903 Tennessee Docs football
- Conference: Independent
- Record: 0–4
- Home stadium: Red Elm Park

1903 Southern college football independents records
	Conf.			Overall
Team	W	L	T	W		L		T
Livingstone		–		3	–	0	–	0
Kentucky University		–		7	–	1	–	0
West Virginia		–		7	–	1	–	0
VPI		–		5	–	1	–	0
South Carolina		–		8	–	2	–	0
Stetson		–		2	–	1	–	1
Virginia		–		7	–	2	–	1
Georgetown		–		7	–	3	–	0
VMI		–		2	–	1	–	0
Texas A&M		–		7	–	3	–	1
North Carolina		–		6	–	3	–	0
Maryland		–		7	–	4	–	0
East Florida Seminary		–		3	–	2	–	1
Florida State College		–		3	–	2	–	1
Oklahoma		–		5	–	4	–	3
Kendall		–		3	–	3	–	0
Louisiana Industrial		–		1	–	1	–	0
North Carolina A&M		–		4	–	4	–	0
Oklahoma A&M		–		0	–	0	–	2
Southwestern Louisiana Industrial		–		1	–	1	–	0
Tusculum		–		1	–	1	–	0
Arkansas		–		3	–	4	–	0
Navy		–		4	–	7	–	1
Howard (AL)		–		2	–	3	–	0
Columbian		–		2	–	5	–	0
Florida		–		1	–	3	–	0
Goldey College		–		0	–	1	–	1
Davidson		–		1	–	4	–	0
Tennessee Docs		–		0	–	4	–	0
TCU		–		0	–	7	–	0

The 1903 Tennessee Docs football team represented University of Tennessee College of Medicine as an independent during the 1903 college football season. The team was beaten by the Cumberland Bulldogs, co-champions of the Southern Intercollegiate Athletic Association (SIAA), 86 to 0. The Tennessee Docs also lost to Ole Miss 17 to 0.

== Schedule ==
Date	Opponent	Site	Result	Source
October 24	at Sewanee	Hardee Field; Sewanee, TN	L 0–52	
November 2	at Cumberland (TN)	Lebanon, TN	L 0–86	
November 7	Ole Miss	Red Elm Park; Memphis, TN	L 0–17	
November 13	at Nashville	Peabody Field; Nashville, TN	L 0–26	
