= 1903 Oklahoma Sooners football team =

American college football season

1903 Oklahoma Sooners football
- Conference: Independent
- Record: 5–4–3
- Head coach: Mark McMahon (2nd season)
- Captain: Clyde Bogle

1903 Southern college football independents records
	Conf.			Overall
Team	W	L	T	W		L		T
Livingstone		–		3	–	0	–	0
Kentucky University		–		7	–	1	–	0
West Virginia		–		7	–	1	–	0
VPI		–		5	–	1	–	0
South Carolina		–		8	–	2	–	0
Stetson		–		2	–	1	–	1
Virginia		–		7	–	2	–	1
Georgetown		–		7	–	3	–	0
VMI		–		2	–	1	–	0
Texas A&M		–		7	–	3	–	1
North Carolina		–		6	–	3	–	0
Maryland		–		7	–	4	–	0
East Florida Seminary		–		3	–	2	–	1
Florida State College		–		3	–	2	–	1
Oklahoma		–		5	–	4	–	3
Kendall		–		3	–	3	–	0
Louisiana Industrial		–		1	–	1	–	0
North Carolina A&M		–		4	–	4	–	0
Oklahoma A&M		–		0	–	0	–	2
Southwestern Louisiana Industrial		–		1	–	1	–	0
Tusculum		–		1	–	1	–	0
Arkansas		–		3	–	4	–	0
Navy		–		4	–	7	–	1
Howard (AL)		–		2	–	3	–	0
Columbian		–		2	–	5	–	0
Florida		–		1	–	3	–	0
Goldey College		–		0	–	1	–	1
Davidson		–		1	–	4	–	0
Tennessee Docs		–		0	–	4	–	0
TCU		–		0	–	7	–	0

The 1903 Oklahoma Sooners football team represented the University of Oklahoma as an independent during the 1903 college football season. In their second year under head coach Mark McMahon, the Sooners compiled a 5–4–3 record, and outscored their opponents by a combined total of 93 to 35.

== Schedule ==
Date	Opponent	Site	Result	Attendance	Source
October 3	Chilocco	Norman, Oklahoma Territory	W 38–5		
October 9	at Kingfisher	Kingfisher, Oklahoma Territory	T 0–0		
October 17	at Texas	Varsity Athletic Field; Austin, TX (rivalry)	T 6–6		
October 19	at Texas A&M	Bryan, TX	W 6–0		
October 26	vs. Fairmount	Oklahoma City, Oklahoma Territory	W 11–5		
October 31	Kansas State Normal	Norman, Oklahoma Territory	T 6–6		
November 7	at Kansas	McCook Field; Lawrence, KS	L 5–17		
November 13	vs. Texas	Colcord Park; Oklahoma City, Oklahoma Territory	L 5–11	2,000	
November 19	at Arkansas	The Hill; Fayetteville, AR	L 0–12		
November 20	vs. Missouri Mines	Joplin, MO	W 12–6		
November 26	vs. Bethany (KS)	Colcord Park; Oklahoma City, Oklahoma Territory	L 10–12	6,000	
December 4	at Lawton Town Team	Lawton, Oklahoma Territory	W 27–5		
