= 1903 Kentucky University football team =

American college football season

1903 Kentucky University football

Southern champion
- Conference: Independent
- Record: 7–1
- Head coach: R. R. Sheffield (1st season)

1903 Southern college football independents records
	Conf.			Overall
Team	W	L	T	W		L		T
Livingstone		–		3	–	0	–	0
Kentucky University		–		7	–	1	–	0
West Virginia		–		7	–	1	–	0
VPI		–		5	–	1	–	0
South Carolina		–		8	–	2	–	0
Stetson		–		2	–	1	–	1
Virginia		–		7	–	2	–	1
Georgetown		–		7	–	3	–	0
VMI		–		2	–	1	–	0
Texas A&M		–		7	–	3	–	1
North Carolina		–		6	–	3	–	0
Maryland		–		7	–	4	–	0
East Florida Seminary		–		3	–	2	–	1
Florida State College		–		3	–	2	–	1
Oklahoma		–		5	–	4	–	3
Kendall		–		3	–	3	–	0
Louisiana Industrial		–		1	–	1	–	0
North Carolina A&M		–		4	–	4	–	0
Oklahoma A&M		–		0	–	0	–	2
Southwestern Louisiana Industrial		–		1	–	1	–	0
Tusculum		–		1	–	1	–	0
Arkansas		–		3	–	4	–	0
Navy		–		4	–	7	–	1
Howard (AL)		–		2	–	3	–	0
Columbian		–		2	–	5	–	0
Florida		–		1	–	3	–	0
Goldey College		–		0	–	1	–	1
Davidson		–		1	–	4	–	0
Tennessee Docs		–		0	–	4	–	0
TCU		–		0	–	7	–	0

The 1903 Kentucky University football team represented Kentucky University, today known as Transylvania University, during the 1903 college football season. The team claimed a championship of the south.

== Before the season ==
Later Lexington mayor Hogan Yancey was a star fullback on the team. A game with Purdue was scheduled; derailed by the Purdue Wreck.

== Schedule ==
Date	Time	Opponent	Site	Result	Attendance	Source
September 24		Kentucky Military Institute	Lexington, KY	W 11–2		
October 1		St. Xavier	Lexington, KY	W 21–0		
October 17		at Virginia	Charlottesville, VA	L 0–6		
October 31	3:30 p.m.	at North Carolina	Cone Athletic Park (I); Greensboro, NC	W 6–5		
November 2		at North Carolina A&M	State Fairgrounds; Raleigh, NC	W 18–0		
November 14		Williamsburg Academy	Lexington, KY	W 52–0		
November 19		Indiana	Lexington, KY	W 18–5		
November 26	2:00 p.m.	vs. Kentucky State College	South Side Park; Lexington, KY (rivalry)	W 17–0	3,000–5,000	

== Game summaries ==
=== Week 1: KMI ===
Kentucky opened the season with a 11 to 2 defeat of Kentucky Military Institute.

=== Week 2: Xavier ===
In the second week of play, Kentucky beat Xavier 21 to 0.

=== Week 3: Virginia ===
Kentucky University at Virginia

Team	1	2	Total
• Virginia	6	0	6
Kentucky U	0	0	0

- Date: October 17
- Location: Charlottesville, VA
- Referee: Daniel (Virginia)

In a drizzling rain, Virginia defeated Kentucky 6 to 0. Virginia recovered a fumble by Kentucky after four minutes of play and eventually scored.

The starting lineup for Kentucky: Knight (left end), Woodward (left tackle), Wallace (left guard), Daingerfield (center), Nickel (right guard), Ware (right tackle), Thompson (right end), Muir (quarterback), Cantrill (left halfback), H. Yancey (right halfback), W. Yancey (fullback).

=== Week 4: North Carolina ===
Kentucky University at North Carolina

Team	1	2	Total
• Kentucky U	0	6	6
North Carolina	5	0	5

- Date: October 31
- Location: Greensboro, NC

Kentucky narrowly beat the North Carolina Tar Heels by a score of 6 to 5. UNC scored in the first half, but failed to kick goal. The second half was fiercely competitive, but a "splendid trick play" resulted in a 30-yard touchdown for Kentucky.

=== Week 5: North Carolina A & M ===
Kentucky University at North Carolina A&M

Team	1	2	Total
• Kentucky U	12	6	18
North Carolina A&M	0	0	0

- Date: November 2
- Location: Raleigh, NC
- Referee: Joel Whitaker

Kentucky scored three touchdowns and defeated North Carolina A&M 18 to 0.

The starting lineup for Kentucky: Simpson (left end), Woodwith (left tackle), Kelly (left guard), Miller (center), Nichols (right guard), Wallace (right tackle), Thompson (right end), W. Yancy (quarterback), E. Yancy (left halfback), Cantrell (right halfback), Weir (fullback).

=== Week 6: Williamsburg Academy ===
Kentucky defeated Williamsburg Academy 52 to 0.

=== Week 7: Indiana ===
Indiana at Kentucky University

Team	1	2	Total
Indiana	0	5	5
• Kentucky U	0	18	18

- Date: November 19, 1903
- Location: Lexington, KY

Kentucky University defeated the Indiana Hoosiers 18 to 5. Zora Clevenger scored Indiana's lone touchdown.

The starting lineup for Kentucky University against Indiana: Simpson (left end), Woodard (left tackle), Ware (left guard), Miller (center), Kelly (right guard), Wallace (right tackle), Thompson (right end), Pyle (quarterback), Cantrill (left halfback), H. Yancey (right halfback), Knight (fullback)

=== Week 8: vs. Kentucky State College ===
Kentucky University vs. Kentucky State College

Team	1	2	Total
Kentucky State	0	0	0
• Kentucky U	11	6	17

- Date: November 26, 1903
- Location: Lexington, KY
- Game attendance: 3,000

A fear of riots plagued this contest ever since their second-team played Kentucky State College.

== Postseason ==
The team claimed a championship of the south. Nash Buckingham rated Kentucky University and Vanderbilt as best in the south.

Former Yale quarterback John de Saulles selected end Lois Thompson for his All-Southern team, crediting him as playing "a better end than any man in the South."
