= 1903 Howard Crimson and Blue football team =

American college football season

1903 Howard Crimson and Blue football
- Conference: Independent
- Record: 2–3
- Head coach: Walter T. O'Hara (1st season; first 2 games); Houston Gwin (2nd, season, final 3 games)
- Home stadium: West End Park

1903 Southern college football independents records
	Conf.			Overall
Team	W	L	T	W		L		T
Livingstone		–		3	–	0	–	0
Kentucky University		–		7	–	1	–	0
West Virginia		–		7	–	1	–	0
VPI		–		5	–	1	–	0
South Carolina		–		8	–	2	–	0
Stetson		–		2	–	1	–	1
Virginia		–		7	–	2	–	1
Georgetown		–		7	–	3	–	0
VMI		–		2	–	1	–	0
Texas A&M		–		7	–	3	–	1
North Carolina		–		6	–	3	–	0
Maryland		–		7	–	4	–	0
East Florida Seminary		–		3	–	2	–	1
Florida State College		–		3	–	2	–	1
Oklahoma		–		5	–	4	–	3
Kendall		–		3	–	3	–	0
Louisiana Industrial		–		1	–	1	–	0
North Carolina A&M		–		4	–	4	–	0
Oklahoma A&M		–		0	–	0	–	2
Southwestern Louisiana Industrial		–		1	–	1	–	0
Tusculum		–		1	–	1	–	0
Arkansas		–		3	–	4	–	0
Navy		–		4	–	7	–	1
Howard (AL)		–		2	–	3	–	0
Columbian		–		2	–	5	–	0
Florida		–		1	–	3	–	0
Goldey College		–		0	–	1	–	1
Davidson		–		1	–	4	–	0
Tennessee Docs		–		0	–	4	–	0
TCU		–		0	–	7	–	0

The 1903 Howard Crimson and Blue football team was an American football team that represented Howard College (now known as the Samford University) as an independent during the 1903 college football season. Under head coaches Walter T. O'Hara (games 1–2) and Houston Gwin (games 3–5), the team compiled a record of 2–3.

== Schedule ==
Date	Opponent	Site	Result	Source
October 7	University High School	West End Park; Birmingham, AL	W 6–0	
October 17	at Auburn	Auburn, AL	L 0–58	
October 31	Georgia Tech	West End Park; Birmingham, AL	L 0–37	
November 20	at Sheffield High School	Baseball Grounds; Sheffield, AL	W 17–0	
November 26	at Marion	Marion, AL	L 0–27	
