= 1903 North Carolina A&M Aggies football team =

American college football season

1903 North Carolina A&M Aggies football
- Conference: Independent
- Record: 4–4
- Head coach: Art Devlin (2nd season)

1903 Southern college football independents records
	Conf.			Overall
Team	W	L	T	W		L		T
Livingstone		–		3	–	0	–	0
Kentucky University		–		7	–	1	–	0
West Virginia		–		7	–	1	–	0
VPI		–		5	–	1	–	0
South Carolina		–		8	–	2	–	0
Stetson		–		2	–	1	–	1
Virginia		–		7	–	2	–	1
Georgetown		–		7	–	3	–	0
VMI		–		2	–	1	–	0
Texas A&M		–		7	–	3	–	1
North Carolina		–		6	–	3	–	0
Maryland		–		7	–	4	–	0
East Florida Seminary		–		3	–	2	–	1
Florida State College		–		3	–	2	–	1
Oklahoma		–		5	–	4	–	3
Kendall		–		3	–	3	–	0
Louisiana Industrial		–		1	–	1	–	0
North Carolina A&M		–		4	–	4	–	0
Oklahoma A&M		–		0	–	0	–	2
Southwestern Louisiana Industrial		–		1	–	1	–	0
Tusculum		–		1	–	1	–	0
Arkansas		–		3	–	4	–	0
Navy		–		4	–	7	–	1
Howard (AL)		–		2	–	3	–	0
Columbian		–		2	–	5	–	0
Florida		–		1	–	3	–	0
Goldey College		–		0	–	1	–	1
Davidson		–		1	–	4	–	0
Tennessee Docs		–		0	–	4	–	0
TCU		–		0	–	7	–	0

The 1903 North Carolina A&M Aggies football team represented the North Carolina A&M Aggies of North Carolina College of Agriculture and Mechanic Arts (now known as North Carolina State University) during the 1903 college football season. In Art Devlin's second season as head coach, the Aggies achieved a 4–4 record, tallying the most single-season wins in school history and tying the record of most losses The final two wins came on the same day, with a close, 6–5 decision against the South Carolina and a blowout of Richmond, 53–0. The Aggies outscored their opponents 152 to 74 on the season.

== Schedule ==
Date	Opponent	Site	Result	Source
October 5	Guilford	State Fairgrounds; Raleigh, NC	W 50–0	
October 12	at VMI	VMI Parade Ground; Lexington, VA	L 0–6	
October 17	at VPI	Gibboney Field; Blacksburg, VA	L 0–21	
October 19	at Danville Military Academy	Danville, VA	W 32–0	
October 28	vs. Clemson	Columbia, SC (rivalry)	L 0–24	
November 2	Kentucky University	State Fairgrounds; Raleigh, NC	L 0–18	
November 14	South Carolina	Raleigh, NC	W 6–5	
November 23	Richmond	Raleigh, NC	W 53–0	
