= 1903 West Virginia Mountaineers football team =

American college football season

1903 West Virginia Mountaineers football
- Conference: Independent
- Record: 7–1
- Head coach: Harry E. Trout (1st season)
- Captain: Harry M. Seamon

1903 Southern college football independents records
	Conf.			Overall
Team	W	L	T	W		L		T
Livingstone		–		3	–	0	–	0
Kentucky University		–		7	–	1	–	0
West Virginia		–		7	–	1	–	0
VPI		–		5	–	1	–	0
South Carolina		–		8	–	2	–	0
Stetson		–		2	–	1	–	1
Virginia		–		7	–	2	–	1
Georgetown		–		7	–	3	–	0
VMI		–		2	–	1	–	0
Texas A&M		–		7	–	3	–	1
North Carolina		–		6	–	3	–	0
Maryland		–		7	–	4	–	0
East Florida Seminary		–		3	–	2	–	1
Florida State College		–		3	–	2	–	1
Oklahoma		–		5	–	4	–	3
Kendall		–		3	–	3	–	0
Louisiana Industrial		–		1	–	1	–	0
North Carolina A&M		–		4	–	4	–	0
Oklahoma A&M		–		0	–	0	–	2
Southwestern Louisiana Industrial		–		1	–	1	–	0
Tusculum		–		1	–	1	–	0
Arkansas		–		3	–	4	–	0
Navy		–		4	–	7	–	1
Howard (AL)		–		2	–	3	–	0
Columbian		–		2	–	5	–	0
Florida		–		1	–	3	–	0
Goldey College		–		0	–	1	–	1
Davidson		–		1	–	4	–	0
Tennessee Docs		–		0	–	4	–	0
TCU		–		0	–	7	–	0

The 1903 West Virginia Mountaineers football team was an American football team that represented West Virginia University as an independent during the 1903 college football season. In its first and only season under head coach Harry E. Trout, the team compiled a 7–1 record and outscored opponents by a combined total of 146 to 45. The team's only loss was to Ohio State by a 34–6 score. Harry M. Seamon was the team captain.

== Schedule ==
Date	Opponent	Site	Result	Source
October 3	Western University of Pennsylvania	Athletic Field; Morgantown, WV (rivalry)	W 24–6	
October 10	Grove City	Morgantown, WV	W 21–0	
October 16	at Marietta	Marietta, OH	W 18–11	
October 19	vs. West Virginia Wesleyan	Clarksburg, WV	W 39–0	
October 24	Westminster (PA)	Morgantown, WV	W 21–0	
October 31	at Ohio State	Ohio Field; Columbus, OH	L 6–34	
November 14	vs. Bethany (WV)	Wheeling, WV	W 11–5	
November 21	at Washington & Jefferson	College Park; Washington, PA	W 5–5 (forfeit)	
