= 1903 Arkansas Cardinals football team =

American college football season

1903 Arkansas Cardinals football
- Conference: Independent
- Record: 3–4
- Head coach: D. A. McDaniel (1st season)
- Captain: Henry Ragland
- Home stadium: The Hill

1903 Southern college football independents records
	Conf.			Overall
Team	W	L	T	W		L		T
Livingstone		–		3	–	0	–	0
Kentucky University		–		7	–	1	–	0
West Virginia		–		7	–	1	–	0
VPI		–		5	–	1	–	0
South Carolina		–		8	–	2	–	0
Stetson		–		2	–	1	–	1
Virginia		–		7	–	2	–	1
Georgetown		–		7	–	3	–	0
VMI		–		2	–	1	–	0
Texas A&M		–		7	–	3	–	1
North Carolina		–		6	–	3	–	0
Maryland		–		7	–	4	–	0
East Florida Seminary		–		3	–	2	–	1
Florida State College		–		3	–	2	–	1
Oklahoma		–		5	–	4	–	3
Kendall		–		3	–	3	–	0
Louisiana Industrial		–		1	–	1	–	0
North Carolina A&M		–		4	–	4	–	0
Oklahoma A&M		–		0	–	0	–	2
Southwestern Louisiana Industrial		–		1	–	1	–	0
Tusculum		–		1	–	1	–	0
Arkansas		–		3	–	5	–	0
Navy		–		4	–	7	–	1
Howard (AL)		–		2	–	3	–	0
Columbian		–		2	–	5	–	0
Florida		–		1	–	3	–	0
Goldey College		–		0	–	1	–	1
Davidson		–		1	–	4	–	0
Tennessee Docs		–		0	–	4	–	0
TCU		–		0	–	7	–	0

The 1903 Arkansas Cardinals football team represented the University of Arkansas during the 1903 college football season. In their first and only season under head coach D. A. McDaniel (an alumnus of the University of Texas), the Razorbacks compiled a 3–4 record and were outscored by their opponents by a combined total of 75 to 56.

== Schedule ==
Date	Opponent	Site	Result	Attendance	Source
October 2	Springfield Normal	The Hill; Fayetteville, AR	L 5–10		
October 10	at Missouri Mines	Rolla, MO	L 6–17		
October 12	at Drury	Springfield, MO	W 10–6		
October 29	at Texas	Varsity Athletic Field; Austin, TX (rivalry)	L 0–15	800	
October 31	vs. Texas A&M	Houston, TX (rivalry)	L 0–6		
November 7	vs. Warrensburg Teachers	Joplin, MO	L 6–12		
November 7	Fort Smith High School	The Hill; Fayetteville, AR	W 17–9		
November 19	Oklahoma	The Hill; Fayetteville, AR	W 12–0		
