= 1903 Stetson Hatters football team =

American college football season

1903 Stetson Hatters football

State champion
- Conference: Independent
- Record: 2–1–1
- Head coach: Litchfield Colton (1st season)

1903 Southern college football independents records
| | Conf. | | | Overall |
| Team | W | L | T | W | | L | | T |
|---|---|---|---|---|---|---|---|---|
| Livingstone | | – | | 3 | – | 0 | – | 0 |
| Kentucky University | | – | | 7 | – | 1 | – | 0 |
| West Virginia | | – | | 7 | – | 1 | – | 0 |
| VPI | | – | | 5 | – | 1 | – | 0 |
| South Carolina | | – | | 8 | – | 2 | – | 0 |
| Stetson | | – | | 2 | – | 1 | – | 1 |
| Virginia | | – | | 7 | – | 2 | – | 1 |
| Georgetown | | – | | 7 | – | 3 | – | 0 |
| VMI | | – | | 2 | – | 1 | – | 0 |
| Texas A&M | | – | | 7 | – | 3 | – | 1 |
| North Carolina | | – | | 6 | – | 3 | – | 0 |
| Maryland | | – | | 7 | – | 4 | – | 0 |
| East Florida Seminary | | – | | 3 | – | 2 | – | 1 |
| Florida State College | | – | | 3 | – | 2 | – | 1 |
| Oklahoma | | – | | 5 | – | 4 | – | 3 |
| Kendall | | – | | 3 | – | 3 | – | 0 |
| Louisiana Industrial | | – | | 1 | – | 1 | – | 0 |
| North Carolina A&M | | – | | 4 | – | 4 | – | 0 |
| Oklahoma A&M | | – | | 0 | – | 0 | – | 2 |
| Southwestern Louisiana Industrial | | – | | 1 | – | 1 | – | 0 |
| Tusculum | | – | | 1 | – | 1 | – | 0 |
| Arkansas | | – | | 3 | – | 4 | – | 0 |
| Navy | | – | | 4 | – | 7 | – | 1 |
| Howard (AL) | | – | | 2 | – | 3 | – | 0 |
| Columbian | | – | | 2 | – | 5 | – | 0 |
| Florida | | – | | 1 | – | 3 | – | 0 |
| Goldey College | | – | | 0 | – | 1 | – | 1 |
| Davidson | | – | | 1 | – | 4 | – | 0 |
| Tennessee Docs | | – | | 0 | – | 4 | – | 0 |
| TCU | | – | | 0 | – | 7 | – | 0 |

The 1903 Stetson Hatters football team represented the private Stetson College in the sport of American football during the 1903 college football season. The team claimed a state title. The tie with Florida State prevented State from receiving the Times-Union Cup.

== Schedule ==
| Date | Time | Opponent | Site | Result | Source |
|---|---|---|---|---|---|
| October 31 | 2:30 p. m. | at Tampa | Tampa, FL | W 5–0 | |
| November 6 | | vs. University of Florida (Lake City) | Jacksonville, FL | W 6–5 | |
| November 13 | | East Florida Seminary | | L 0–16 | |
| November 26 | | Florida State College | Deland, FL | T 5–5 | |
