= 1903 North Carolina Tar Heels football team =

American college football season

1903 North Carolina Tar Heels football
- Conference: Independent
- Record: 6–3
- Head coach: Herman Olcott (2nd season)
- Captain: G. Lyle Jones
- Home stadium: Campus Athletic Field (II)

1903 Southern college football independents records
	Conf.			Overall
Team	W	L	T	W		L		T
Livingstone		–		3	–	0	–	0
Kentucky University		–		7	–	1	–	0
West Virginia		–		7	–	1	–	0
VPI		–		5	–	1	–	0
South Carolina		–		8	–	2	–	0
Stetson		–		2	–	1	–	1
Virginia		–		7	–	2	–	1
Georgetown		–		7	–	3	–	0
VMI		–		2	–	1	–	0
Texas A&M		–		7	–	3	–	1
North Carolina		–		6	–	3	–	0
Maryland		–		7	–	4	–	0
East Florida Seminary		–		3	–	2	–	1
Florida State College		–		3	–	2	–	1
Oklahoma		–		5	–	4	–	3
Kendall		–		3	–	3	–	0
Louisiana Industrial		–		1	–	1	–	0
North Carolina A&M		–		4	–	4	–	0
Oklahoma A&M		–		0	–	0	–	2
Southwestern Louisiana Industrial		–		1	–	1	–	0
Tusculum		–		1	–	1	–	0
Arkansas		–		3	–	4	–	0
Navy		–		4	–	7	–	1
Howard (AL)		–		2	–	3	–	0
Columbian		–		2	–	5	–	0
Florida		–		1	–	3	–	0
Goldey College		–		0	–	1	–	1
Davidson		–		1	–	4	–	0
Tennessee Docs		–		0	–	4	–	0
TCU		–		0	–	7	–	0

The 1903 North Carolina Tar Heels football team represented the University of North Carolina in the 1903 college football season. The team captain for the 1903 season was G. Lyle Jones.

== Schedule ==
Date	Time	Opponent	Site	Result	Attendance	Source
September 26	12:35 p.m.	Guilford	Campus Athletic Field (II); Chapel Hill, NC	W 15–0		
October 3	12:30 p.m.	Oak Ridge Military Academy	Campus Athletic Field (II); Chapel Hill, NC	W 45–0		
October 10	4:15 p.m.	at South Carolina	Davis Field; Columbia, SC (rivalry)	W 17–0		
October 17	3:00 p.m.	vs. VMI	Fair Grounds (Roanoke); Roanoke, VA	W 28–6		
October 24	2:00 p.m.	vs. Georgetown	Lafayette Field; Norfolk, VA	L 0–33	2,000	
October 31	3:30 p.m.	vs. Kentucky University	Cone Athletic Park (I); Greensboro, NC	L 5–6		
November 7	3:20 p.m.	vs. VPI	Lafayette Field; Norfolk, VA	L 0–21	2,000	
November 14		Clemson	Campus Athletic Field (II); Chapel Hill, NC	W 11–6		
November 25	2:00 p.m.	vs. Virginia	Broad Street Park (I); Richmond, VA (South's Oldest Rivalry)	W 16–0	7,000	
