= 1903 VMI Keydets football team =

American college football season

1903 VMI Keydets football
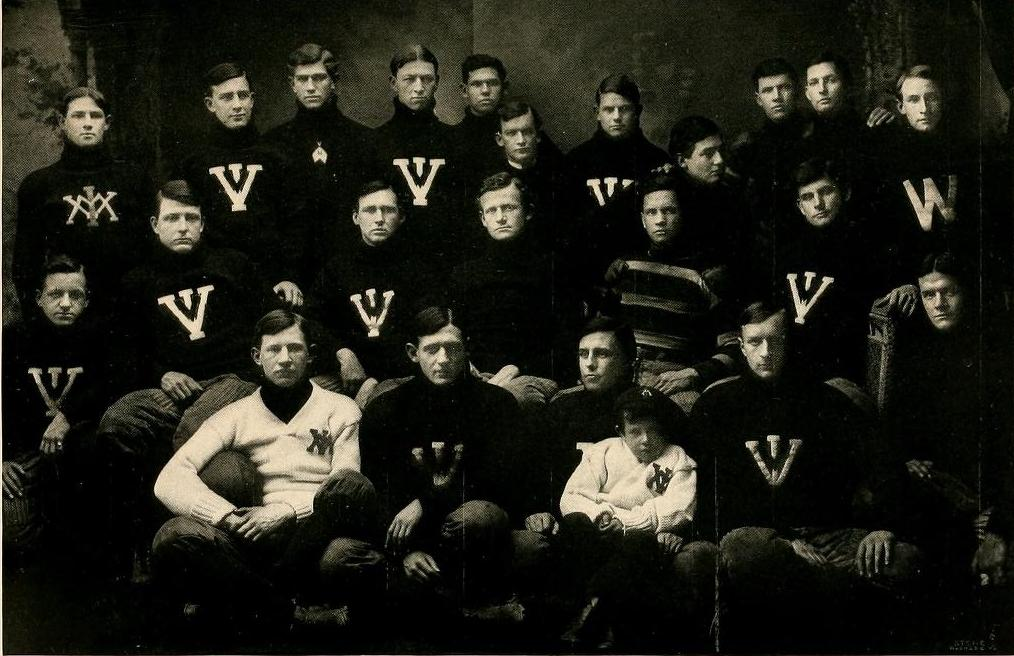
- Conference: Independent
- Record: 2–1
- Head coach: Bill Roper (1st season)

1903 Southern college football independents records
	Conf.			Overall
Team	W	L	T	W		L		T
Livingstone		–		3	–	0	–	0
Kentucky University		–		7	–	1	–	0
West Virginia		–		7	–	1	–	0
VPI		–		5	–	1	–	0
South Carolina		–		8	–	2	–	0
Stetson		–		2	–	1	–	1
Virginia		–		7	–	2	–	1
Georgetown		–		7	–	3	–	0
VMI		–		2	–	1	–	0
Texas A&M		–		7	–	3	–	1
North Carolina		–		6	–	3	–	0
Maryland		–		7	–	4	–	0
East Florida Seminary		–		3	–	2	–	1
Florida State College		–		3	–	2	–	1
Oklahoma		–		5	–	4	–	3
Kendall		–		3	–	3	–	0
Louisiana Industrial		–		1	–	1	–	0
North Carolina A&M		–		4	–	4	–	0
Oklahoma A&M		–		0	–	0	–	2
Southwestern Louisiana Industrial		–		1	–	1	–	0
Tusculum		–		1	–	1	–	0
Arkansas		–		3	–	4	–	0
Navy		–		4	–	7	–	1
Howard (AL)		–		2	–	3	–	0
Columbian		–		2	–	5	–	0
Florida		–		1	–	3	–	0
Goldey College		–		0	–	1	–	1
Davidson		–		1	–	4	–	0
Tennessee Docs		–		0	–	4	–	0
TCU		–		0	–	7	–	0

The 1903 VMI Keydets football team represented the Virginia Military Institute (VMI) in their 13th season of organized football. The Keydets finished a short year at 2–1 led by first-year head coach Bill Roper.

== Schedule ==
Date	Opponent	Site	Result	Source
October 12	North Carolina A&M	VMI Parade Ground; Lexington, VA	W 6–0	
October 17	vs. North Carolina	Roanoke, VA	L 6–28	
Unknown	Old Point Comfort College	VMI Parade Ground; Lexington, VA	W 24–0	
