= 1903 Oklahoma A&M Aggies football team =

American college football season

1903 Oklahoma A&M Aggies football
- Conference: Independent
- Record: 0–0–2
- Head coach: None

1903 Southern college football independents records
	Conf.			Overall
Team	W	L	T	W		L		T
Livingstone		–		3	–	0	–	0
Kentucky University		–		7	–	1	–	0
West Virginia		–		7	–	1	–	0
VPI		–		5	–	1	–	0
South Carolina		–		8	–	2	–	0
Stetson		–		2	–	1	–	1
Virginia		–		7	–	2	–	1
Georgetown		–		7	–	3	–	0
VMI		–		2	–	1	–	0
Texas A&M		–		7	–	3	–	1
North Carolina		–		6	–	3	–	0
Maryland		–		7	–	4	–	0
East Florida Seminary		–		3	–	2	–	1
Florida State College		–		3	–	2	–	1
Oklahoma		–		5	–	4	–	3
Kendall		–		3	–	3	–	0
Louisiana Industrial		–		1	–	1	–	0
North Carolina A&M		–		4	–	4	–	0
Oklahoma A&M		–		0	–	0	–	2
Southwestern Louisiana Industrial		–		1	–	1	–	0
Tusculum		–		1	–	1	–	0
Arkansas		–		3	–	4	–	0
Navy		–		4	–	7	–	1
Howard (AL)		–		2	–	3	–	0
Columbian		–		2	–	5	–	0
Florida		–		1	–	3	–	0
Goldey College		–		0	–	1	–	1
Davidson		–		1	–	4	–	0
Tennessee Docs		–		0	–	4	–	0
TCU		–		0	–	7	–	0

The 1903 Oklahoma A&M Aggies football team represented Oklahoma A&M College in the 1903 college football season. This was the third year of football at A&M and the team did not have a head coach. The Aggies played their home games in Stillwater, Oklahoma Territory. They finished the season 0–0–2.

== Schedule ==
Date	Opponent	Site	Result
November 2	Tonkawa Prep	Stillwater, Oklahoma Territory	T 0–0
November 21	Oklahoma City Military Institute	Stillwater, Oklahoma Territory	T 6–6
November 26	Southwestern (KS)	Stillwater, Oklahoma Territory	cancelled
