= 1903 Davidson football team =

American college football season

1903 Davidson football
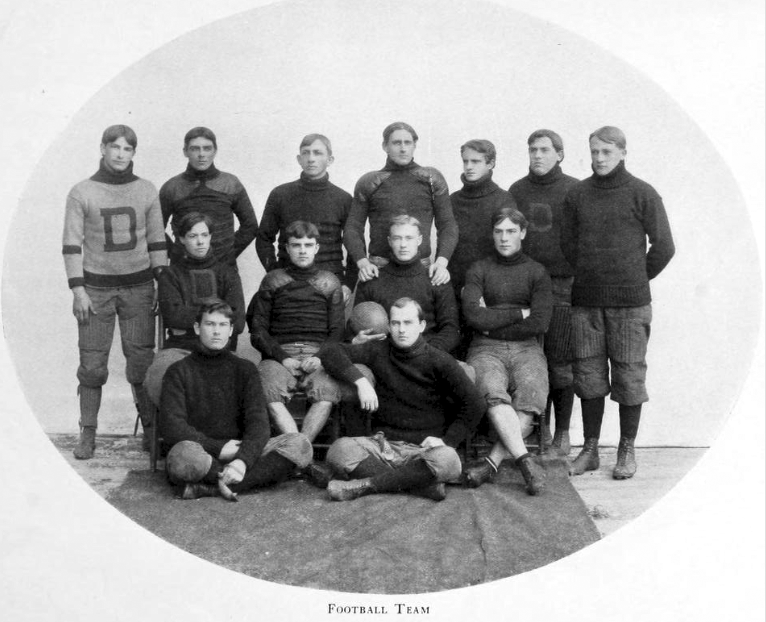
- Conference: Independent
- Record: 1–4
- Head coach: John A. Brewin (4th season)
- Home stadium: Latta Park Baseball Field

1903 Southern college football independents records
	Conf.			Overall
Team	W	L	T	W		L		T
Livingstone		–		3	–	0	–	0
Kentucky University		–		7	–	1	–	0
West Virginia		–		7	–	1	–	0
VPI		–		5	–	1	–	0
South Carolina		–		8	–	2	–	0
Stetson		–		2	–	1	–	1
Virginia		–		7	–	2	–	1
Georgetown		–		7	–	3	–	0
VMI		–		2	–	1	–	0
Texas A&M		–		7	–	3	–	1
North Carolina		–		6	–	3	–	0
Maryland		–		7	–	4	–	0
East Florida Seminary		–		3	–	2	–	1
Florida State College		–		3	–	2	–	1
Oklahoma		–		5	–	4	–	3
Kendall		–		3	–	3	–	0
Louisiana Industrial		–		1	–	1	–	0
North Carolina A&M		–		4	–	4	–	0
Oklahoma A&M		–		0	–	0	–	2
Southwestern Louisiana Industrial		–		1	–	1	–	0
Tusculum		–		1	–	1	–	0
Arkansas		–		3	–	4	–	0
Navy		–		4	–	7	–	1
Howard (AL)		–		2	–	3	–	0
Columbian		–		2	–	5	–	0
Florida		–		1	–	3	–	0
Goldey College		–		0	–	1	–	1
Davidson		–		1	–	4	–	0
Tennessee Docs		–		0	–	4	–	0
TCU		–		0	–	7	–	0

The 1903 Davidson football team was an American football team that represented the Davidson College as an independent during the 1903 college football season. In their fourth year under head coach John A. Brewin, the team compiled a 1–4 record.

== Schedule ==
Date	Opponent	Site	Result	Attendance	Source
October 8	Oak Ridge Institute	Davidson, NC	W 54–0		
October 31	vs. Virginia	Latta Park Baseball Field; Charlotte, NC	L 0–22		
November 9	vs. South Carolina	Latta Park; Charlotte, NC	L 12–29		
November 21	vs. Clemson	Latta Park; Charlotte, NC	L 0–24		
November 26	vs. VPI	Athletic Park; Roanoke, VA	L 0–26	1,200–1,500	
