= 1903 Kendall Orange and Black football team =

American college football season

1903 Kendall Orange and Black football
- Conference: Independent
- Record: 3–3

1903 Southern college football independents records
	Conf.			Overall
Team	W	L	T	W		L		T
Livingstone		–		3	–	0	–	0
Kentucky University		–		7	–	1	–	0
West Virginia		–		7	–	1	–	0
VPI		–		5	–	1	–	0
South Carolina		–		8	–	2	–	0
Stetson		–		2	–	1	–	1
Virginia		–		7	–	2	–	1
Georgetown		–		7	–	3	–	0
VMI		–		2	–	1	–	0
Texas A&M		–		7	–	3	–	1
North Carolina		–		6	–	3	–	0
Maryland		–		7	–	4	–	0
East Florida Seminary		–		3	–	2	–	1
Florida State College		–		3	–	2	–	1
Oklahoma		–		5	–	4	–	3
Kendall		–		3	–	3	–	0
Louisiana Industrial		–		1	–	1	–	0
North Carolina A&M		–		4	–	4	–	0
Oklahoma A&M		–		0	–	0	–	2
Southwestern Louisiana Industrial		–		1	–	1	–	0
Tusculum		–		1	–	1	–	0
Arkansas		–		3	–	4	–	0
Navy		–		4	–	7	–	1
Howard (AL)		–		2	–	3	–	0
Columbian		–		2	–	5	–	0
Florida		–		1	–	3	–	0
Goldey College		–		0	–	1	–	1
Davidson		–		1	–	4	–	0
Tennessee Docs		–		0	–	4	–	0
TCU		–		0	–	7	–	0

The 1903 Kendall Orange and Black football team represented Henry Kendall College—now known as the University of Tulsa—as an independent during the 1903 college football season. The team compiled a record of 3–3.

== Schedule ==
Date	Opponent	Site	Result	Source
October 16	Spaulding Institute	Kendall athletic park; Muskogee, Indian Territory	L 5–11	
October 30	at Willie Halsell College	North Park; Vinita, Indian Territory	L 0–25	
November 5	at Willie Halsell College	Vinita, Indian Territory	W 31–0 or 0–31	
	Bacone	Muskogee, Indian Territory	L 0–25	
early November	Cherokee Male Seminary	Muskogee, Indian Territory	W 5–0	
early November	at Cherokee Male Seminary	Tahlequah, Indian Territory	W 12–0	
