= 1903 South Carolina Gamecocks football team =

American college football season

1903 South Carolina Gamecocks football
- Conference: Independent
- Record: 8–2
- Head coach: Bob Williams (2nd season)
- Captain: Guy Gunter
- Home stadium: College Park

1903 Southern college football independents records
	Conf.			Overall
Team	W	L	T	W		L		T
Livingstone		–		3	–	0	–	0
Kentucky University		–		7	–	1	–	0
West Virginia		–		7	–	1	–	0
VPI		–		5	–	1	–	0
South Carolina		–		8	–	2	–	0
Stetson		–		2	–	1	–	1
Virginia		–		7	–	2	–	1
Georgetown		–		7	–	3	–	0
VMI		–		2	–	1	–	0
Texas A&M		–		7	–	3	–	1
North Carolina		–		6	–	3	–	0
Maryland		–		7	–	4	–	0
East Florida Seminary		–		3	–	2	–	1
Florida State College		–		3	–	2	–	1
Oklahoma		–		5	–	4	–	3
Kendall		–		3	–	3	–	0
Louisiana Industrial		–		1	–	1	–	0
North Carolina A&M		–		4	–	4	–	0
Oklahoma A&M		–		0	–	0	–	2
Southwestern Louisiana Industrial		–		1	–	1	–	0
Tusculum		–		1	–	1	–	0
Arkansas		–		3	–	4	–	0
Navy		–		4	–	7	–	1
Howard (AL)		–		2	–	3	–	0
Columbian		–		2	–	5	–	0
Florida		–		1	–	3	–	0
Goldey College		–		0	–	1	–	1
Davidson		–		1	–	4	–	0
Tennessee Docs		–		0	–	4	–	0
TCU		–		0	–	7	–	0

The 1903 South Carolina Gamecocks football team represented South Carolina College—now known as the University of South Carolina—as an independent during the 1903 college football season. Led by Bob Williams in his second and final season as head coach, South Carolina compiled a record of 8–2.

This was South Carolina's first eight-win season, and would be its last until 1979.

== Schedule ==
Date	Opponent	Site	Result	Source
October 2	Columbia YMCA	College Park; Columbia, SC	W 24–0	
October 6	Welsh Neck High School*	College Park; Columbia, SC	W 78–0	
October 10	North Carolina	College Park; Columbia, SC (rivalry)	L 0–17	
October 17	at Georgia	Herty Field; Athens, GA (rivalry)	W 17–0	
October 23	Guilford	College Park; Columbia, SC	W 29–0	
October 29	Tennessee	Old State Fairgrounds; Columbia, SC (rivalry)	W 24–0	
November 9	Davidson	Latta Park; Charlotte, NC	W 29–12	
November 14	at North Carolina A&M	Raleigh, NC	L 5–6	
November 21	at College of Charleston	City Baseball Park; Charleston, SC	W 6–0	
November 26	at Georgia Tech	Piedmont Park; Atlanta, GA	W 16–0	
*Non-conference game
