= 1903 Virginia Orange and Blue football team =

American college football season

1903 Virginia Orange and Blue football
- Conference: Independent
- Record: 7–2–1
- Head coach: Gresham Poe (1st season)
- Captain: Ira Johnson
- Home stadium: Madison Hall Field

1903 Southern college football independents records
	Conf.			Overall
Team	W	L	T	W		L		T
Livingstone		–		3	–	0	–	0
Kentucky University		–		7	–	1	–	0
West Virginia		–		7	–	1	–	0
VPI		–		5	–	1	–	0
South Carolina		–		8	–	2	–	0
Stetson		–		2	–	1	–	1
Virginia		–		7	–	2	–	1
Georgetown		–		7	–	3	–	0
VMI		–		2	–	1	–	0
Texas A&M		–		7	–	3	–	1
North Carolina		–		6	–	3	–	0
Maryland		–		7	–	4	–	0
East Florida Seminary		–		3	–	2	–	1
Florida State College		–		3	–	2	–	1
Oklahoma		–		5	–	4	–	3
Kendall		–		3	–	3	–	0
Louisiana Industrial		–		1	–	1	–	0
North Carolina A&M		–		4	–	4	–	0
Oklahoma A&M		–		0	–	0	–	2
Southwestern Louisiana Industrial		–		1	–	1	–	0
Tusculum		–		1	–	1	–	0
Arkansas		–		3	–	4	–	0
Navy		–		4	–	7	–	1
Howard (AL)		–		2	–	3	–	0
Columbian		–		2	–	5	–	0
Florida		–		1	–	3	–	0
Goldey College		–		0	–	1	–	1
Davidson		–		1	–	4	–	0
Tennessee Docs		–		0	–	4	–	0
TCU		–		0	–	7	–	0

The 1903 Virginia Orange and Blue football team represented the University of Virginia as an independent during the 1903 college football season. Led by Gresham Poe in his first and only season as head coach, the Orange and Blue compiled a record of 7–2–1.

== Schedule ==
Date	Time	Opponent	Site	Result	Attendance	Source
September 26		St. Albans	Madison Hall Field; Charlottesville, VA	W 16–0		
September 30		Randolph–Macon	Madison Hall Field; Charlottesville, VA	W 37–0		
October 3		Washington and Lee	Madison Hall Field; Charlottesville, VA	W 16–0		
October 10		at Navy	Worden Field; Annapolis, MD	L 5–6		
October 17		Kentucky University	Madison Hall Field; Charlottesville, VA	W 6–0		
October 24	3:15 p.m.	vs. VPI	Broad Street Park; Richmond, VA (rivalry)	W 21–0	4,000	
October 31	3:30 p.m.	vs. Davidson	Latta Park; Charlotte, NC	W 22–0		
November 7		St. John's (MD)	Madison Hall Field; Charlottesville, VA	W 48–6		
November 21	2:30 p.m.	vs. Carlisle	Lafayette Field; Norfolk, VA	T 6–6	5,000	
November 26		North Carolina	Broad Street Park; Richmond, VA (South's Oldest Rivalry)	L 0–16	7,000	
