= 1903 University of Florida Blue and White football team =

College football season

1903 University of Florida Blue and White football
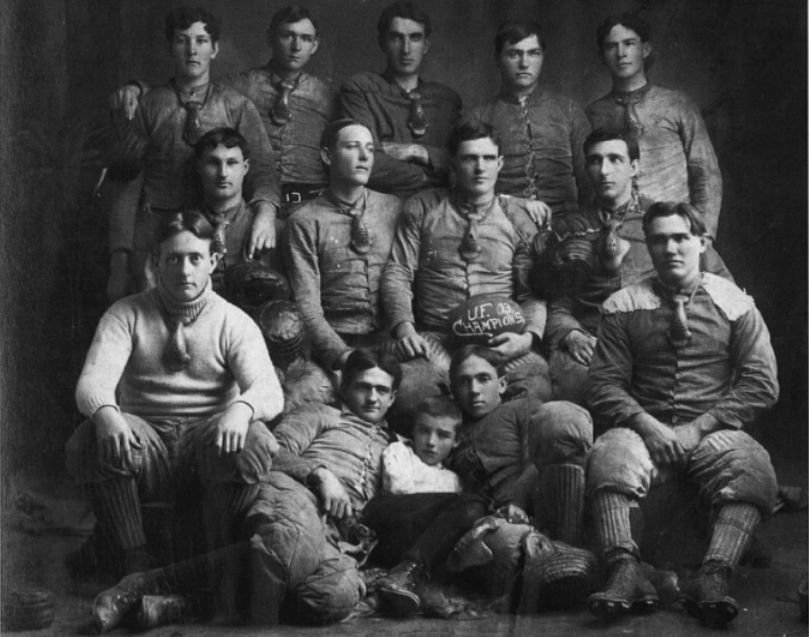
- Conference: Independent
- Record: 1–3
- Head coach: Fleming & A. B. Humphreys (1st season)

1903 Southern college football independents records
	Conf.			Overall
Team	W	L	T	W		L		T
Livingstone		–		3	–	0	–	0
Kentucky University		–		7	–	1	–	0
West Virginia		–		7	–	1	–	0
VPI		–		5	–	1	–	0
South Carolina		–		8	–	2	–	0
Stetson		–		2	–	1	–	1
Virginia		–		7	–	2	–	1
Georgetown		–		7	–	3	–	0
VMI		–		2	–	1	–	0
Texas A&M		–		7	–	3	–	1
North Carolina		–		6	–	3	–	0
Maryland		–		7	–	4	–	0
East Florida Seminary		–		3	–	2	–	1
Florida State College		–		3	–	2	–	1
Oklahoma		–		5	–	4	–	3
Kendall		–		3	–	3	–	0
Louisiana Industrial		–		1	–	1	–	0
North Carolina A&M		–		4	–	4	–	0
Oklahoma A&M		–		0	–	0	–	2
Southwestern Louisiana Industrial		–		1	–	1	–	0
Tusculum		–		1	–	1	–	0
Arkansas		–		3	–	4	–	0
Navy		–		4	–	7	–	1
Howard (AL)		–		2	–	3	–	0
Columbian		–		2	–	5	–	0
Florida		–		1	–	3	–	0
Goldey College		–		0	–	1	–	1
Davidson		–		1	–	4	–	0
Tennessee Docs		–		0	–	4	–	0
TCU		–		0	–	7	–	0

The 1903 University of Florida Blue and White football team represented the University of Florida at Lake City in the sport of American football during the 1903 college football season. This was not the modern Florida Gators football team of the University of Florida in Gainesville, which began in 1906, but one of its four predecessor institutions.

== Schedule ==
Date	Opponent	Site	Result	Source
	East Florida Seminary		L	
	East Florida Seminary		W	
November 6	Stetson		L 5–6	
November 13	at Florida State College	Tallahassee, Florida	L 0–12	
