= 1903 Livingstone football team =

American college football season

1903 Livingstone football
- Conference: Independent
- Record: 3–0?
- Head coach: Unknown

1903 Southern college football independents records
	Conf.			Overall
Team	W	L	T	W		L		T
Livingstone		–		3	–	0	–	0
Kentucky University		–		7	–	1	–	0
West Virginia		–		7	–	1	–	0
VPI		–		5	–	1	–	0
South Carolina		–		8	–	2	–	0
Stetson		–		2	–	1	–	1
Virginia		–		7	–	2	–	1
Georgetown		–		7	–	3	–	0
VMI		–		2	–	1	–	0
Texas A&M		–		7	–	3	–	1
North Carolina		–		6	–	3	–	0
Maryland		–		7	–	4	–	0
East Florida Seminary		–		3	–	2	–	1
Florida State College		–		3	–	2	–	1
Oklahoma		–		5	–	4	–	3
Kendall		–		3	–	3	–	0
Louisiana Industrial		–		1	–	1	–	0
North Carolina A&M		–		4	–	4	–	0
Oklahoma A&M		–		0	–	0	–	2
Southwestern Louisiana Industrial		–		1	–	1	–	0
Tusculum		–		1	–	1	–	0
Arkansas		–		3	–	4	–	0
Navy		–		4	–	7	–	1
Howard (AL)		–		2	–	3	–	0
Columbian		–		2	–	5	–	0
Florida		–		1	–	3	–	0
Goldey College		–		0	–	1	–	1
Davidson		–		1	–	4	–	0
Tennessee Docs		–		0	–	4	–	0
TCU		–		0	–	7	–	0

The 1903 Livingstone football team represented Livingstone College in the 1903 college football season as an independent. Results may be incomplete, but Livingstone played in at least three games, winning each. An article by The Charlotte Observer stated that "Livingstone has defeated all comers this year, and claims the championship of the colored colleges of the state."

== Schedule ==
Date	Time	Opponent	Site	Result	Source
c. November 23		Bennett College		W ?	
November 26	3:30 p.m.	Y. M. I.		W 5–0	
November 30		Bennett College	Salisbury, NC	W 23–5	
