= 1903 Navy Midshipmen football team =

American college football season

1903 Navy Midshipmen football
- Conference: Independent
- Record: 4–7–1
- Head coach: Burr Chamberlain (1st season)
- Captain: Charles Soule
- Home stadium: Worden Field

1903 Southern college football independents records
	Conf.			Overall
Team	W	L	T	W		L		T
Livingstone		–		3	–	0	–	0
Kentucky University		–		7	–	1	–	0
West Virginia		–		7	–	1	–	0
VPI		–		5	–	1	–	0
South Carolina		–		8	–	2	–	0
Stetson		–		2	–	1	–	1
Virginia		–		7	–	2	–	1
Georgetown		–		7	–	3	–	0
VMI		–		2	–	1	–	0
Texas A&M		–		7	–	3	–	1
North Carolina		–		6	–	3	–	0
Maryland		–		7	–	4	–	0
East Florida Seminary		–		3	–	2	–	1
Florida State College		–		3	–	2	–	1
Oklahoma		–		5	–	4	–	3
Kendall		–		3	–	3	–	0
Louisiana Industrial		–		1	–	1	–	0
North Carolina A&M		–		4	–	4	–	0
Oklahoma A&M		–		0	–	0	–	2
Southwestern Louisiana Industrial		–		1	–	1	–	0
Tusculum		–		1	–	1	–	0
Arkansas		–		3	–	4	–	0
Navy		–		4	–	7	–	1
Howard (AL)		–		2	–	3	–	0
Columbian		–		2	–	5	–	0
Florida		–		1	–	3	–	0
Goldey College		–		0	–	1	–	1
Davidson		–		1	–	4	–	0
Tennessee Docs		–		0	–	4	–	0
TCU		–		0	–	7	–	0

The 1903 Navy Midshipmen football team represented the United States Naval Academy during the 1903 college football season. In their first and only season under head coach Burr Chamberlain, the Midshipmen compiled a 4–7–1 record, shut out four opponents (including a scoreless tie with Baltimore Medical College), and were outscored by all opponents by a combined score of 130 to 77.

== Schedule ==
Date	Opponent	Site	Result	Source
October 10	Virginia	Worden Field; Annapolis, MD	W 6–5	
October 14	Gallaudet	Worden Field; Annapolis, MD	W 18–0	
October 17	Dickinson	Worden Field; Annapolis, MD	W 5–0	
October 21	Baltimore Medical	Worden Field; Annapolis, MD	T 0–0	
October 24	Lafayette	Worden Field; Annapolis, MD	L 5–6	
October 28	Georgetown	Worden Field; Annapolis, MD	L 5-12	
October 31	Penn State	Worden Field; Annapolis, MD	L 0-17	
November 4	New York Naval Militia	Worden Field; Annapolis, MD	W 28–0	
November 7	Washington & Jefferson	Worden Field; Annapolis, MD	L 0–16	
November 14	Bucknell	Worden Field; Annapolis, MD	L 5–23	
November 21	VPI	Worden Field; Annapolis, MD	L 0–11	
November 28	vs. Army	Franklin Field; Philadelphia, PA (Army–Navy Game)	L 5–40	
