= 1903 Georgetown Blue and Gray football team =

American college football season

1903 Georgetown Blue and Gray football
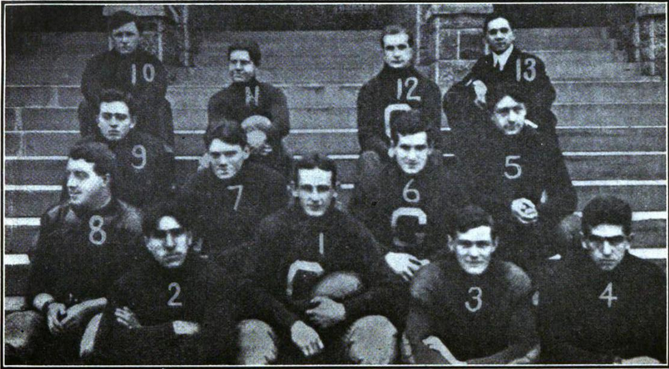

Southern champion
- Conference: Independent
- Record: 7–3
- Head coach: Philip King (1st season)
- Captain: Hub Hart
- Home stadium: Georgetown Field

1903 Southern college football independents records
	Conf.			Overall
Team	W	L	T	W		L		T
Livingstone		–		3	–	0	–	0
Kentucky University		–		7	–	1	–	0
West Virginia		–		7	–	1	–	0
VPI		–		5	–	1	–	0
South Carolina		–		8	–	2	–	0
Stetson		–		2	–	1	–	1
Virginia		–		7	–	2	–	1
Georgetown		–		7	–	3	–	0
VMI		–		2	–	1	–	0
Texas A&M		–		7	–	3	–	1
North Carolina		–		6	–	3	–	0
Maryland		–		7	–	4	–	0
East Florida Seminary		–		3	–	2	–	1
Florida State College		–		3	–	2	–	1
Oklahoma		–		5	–	4	–	3
Kendall		–		3	–	3	–	0
Louisiana Industrial		–		1	–	1	–	0
North Carolina A&M		–		4	–	4	–	0
Oklahoma A&M		–		0	–	0	–	2
Southwestern Louisiana Industrial		–		1	–	1	–	0
Tusculum		–		1	–	1	–	0
Arkansas		–		3	–	4	–	0
Navy		–		4	–	7	–	1
Howard (AL)		–		2	–	3	–	0
Columbian		–		2	–	5	–	0
Florida		–		1	–	3	–	0
Goldey College		–		0	–	1	–	1
Davidson		–		1	–	4	–	0
Tennessee Docs		–		0	–	4	–	0
TCU		–		0	–	7	–	0

The 1903 Georgetown Blue and Gray football team represented Georgetown University during the 1903 college football season. Led by Philip King in his first year as head coach, the team went 7–3 and claims a Southern championship. National champion Princeton's two closest game were against Yale and Georgetown. Captain Hub Hart had a 99-yard run from scrimmage against Maryland; this is still a school record.

== Schedule ==
Date	Time	Opponent	Site	Result	Attendance	Source
September 28		at Maryland	Maryland Agricultural College Field; College Park, MD	W 28–0		
October 3		at Princeton	University Field; Princeton, NJ	L 0–5		
October 10		St. Alban's	Georgetown Field; Washington, DC	W 25–0		
October 17		at Baltimore Medical	Oriole Park; Baltimore, MD	W 23–0		
October 24	2:00 p.m.	vs. North Carolina	Lafayette Field; Norfolk, VA	W 33–0	2,000	
October 28		at Navy	Worden Field; Annapolis, MD	W 12–5		
November 7		Carlisle	Georgetown Field; Washington, DC	L 6–28		
November 14		Columbian	Georgetown Field; Washington, DC	W 33–0		
November 21		Gallaudet	Georgetown Field; Washington, DC	W 29–0		
November 26		Lehigh	Georgetown Field; Washington, DC	L 6–12		

== Players ==
=== Line ===
Player	Position
Larry Brennan	guard
Larry Canario	end
Kangaroo Carroll	tackle
Sam Edmonston	tackle
Percy Given	center
Mike Kernan	end
Matt Mahoney	guard
Charley McGuire	center
Ed Monahan	tackle
Pop Rorke	guard
Joe Seitz	tackle
Ed Sutton	end

=== Backfield ===
Player	Position
Ray Abbatichio	halfback
Branch Bocock	quarterback
Joe Dugan	halfback
Preston Edmonston	fullback
Leo Fitzpatrick	halfback
Bill Graham	fullback
Hub Hart	halfback
Doc Martel	fullback
Charley McCarthy	halfback
Ferd McGettigan	quarterback
John Monahan	halfback
Red Morgan	fullback
Joe Reilly	halfback
John Richmond	halfback
