= 1903 Columbian Orange and Blue football team =

American college football season

1903 Columbian Orange and Blue football
- Conference: Independent
- Record: 2–5
- Head coach: David Houston (1st season)

1903 Southern college football independents records
	Conf.			Overall
Team	W	L	T	W		L		T
Livingstone		–		3	–	0	–	0
Kentucky University		–		7	–	1	–	0
West Virginia		–		7	–	1	–	0
VPI		–		5	–	1	–	0
South Carolina		–		8	–	2	–	0
Stetson		–		2	–	1	–	1
Virginia		–		7	–	2	–	1
Georgetown		–		7	–	3	–	0
VMI		–		2	–	1	–	0
Texas A&M		–		7	–	3	–	1
North Carolina		–		6	–	3	–	0
Maryland		–		7	–	4	–	0
East Florida Seminary		–		3	–	2	–	1
Florida State College		–		3	–	2	–	1
Oklahoma		–		5	–	4	–	3
Kendall		–		3	–	3	–	0
Louisiana Industrial		–		1	–	1	–	0
North Carolina A&M		–		4	–	4	–	0
Oklahoma A&M		–		0	–	0	–	2
Southwestern Louisiana Industrial		–		1	–	1	–	0
Tusculum		–		1	–	1	–	0
Arkansas		–		3	–	4	–	0
Navy		–		4	–	7	–	1
Howard (AL)		–		2	–	3	–	0
Columbian		–		2	–	5	–	0
Florida		–		1	–	3	–	0
Goldey College		–		0	–	1	–	1
Davidson		–		1	–	4	–	0
Tennessee Docs		–		0	–	4	–	0
TCU		–		0	–	7	–	0

The 1903 Columbian Orange and Blue football team was an American football team that represented Columbian University (now known as George Washington University) as an independent during the 1903 college football season. In their first season under head coach David Houston, the team compiled a 2–5 record.

== Schedule ==
Date	Time	Opponent	Site	Result	Source
October 17		Western Maryland	Van Ness Field; Washington, DC	L 0–6	
October 24		Gallaudet	Van Ness Field; Washington, DC	W 6–0	
October 31		Maryland	Van Ness Field; Washington, DC	L 0–6	
November 7	3:30 p.m.	at Richmond	Broad Street Park; Richmond, VA	L 6–22	
November 9		at Randolph–Macon	Ashland, VA	W 6–0	
November 14		at Georgetown	Georgetown Field; Washington, DC	L 0–33	
November 26		Gallaudet	Washington, DC	L 0–5	
