= 1903 Southern Intercollegiate Athletic Association football season =

- League: NCAA
- Sport: College football
- Duration: September 25, 1903 through November 29, 1903
- Teams: 18

Regular Season
- Season champions: Clemson; Cumberland
- East champions: Clemson Tigers
- West champions: Cumberland Bulldogs

Football seasons
- ← 1902 1904 →

1903 Southern Intercollegiate Athletic Association football standings
	Conf.					Overall
Team	W		L		T	W		L		T
Clemson +	2	–	0	–	1	4	–	1	–	1
Cumberland (TN) +	4	–	1	–	1	6	–	1	–	1
Sewanee	5	–	1	–	0	7	–	1	–	0
Vanderbilt	5	–	1	–	1	6	–	1	–	1
Mississippi A&M	2	–	0	–	2	3	–	0	–	2
Georgia	3	–	2	–	0	3	–	4	–	0
Ole Miss	1	–	1	–	1	2	–	1	–	1
Texas	0	–	0	–	1	5	–	1	–	2
Kentucky State	0	–	0	–	0	6	–	1	–	0
Alabama	3	–	4	–	0	3	–	4	–	0
Auburn	2	–	3	–	0	4	–	3	–	0
Tennessee	2	–	4	–	0	4	–	5	–	0
Georgia Tech	1	–	4	–	0	3	–	5	–	0
Tulane	0	–	1	–	1	2	–	2	–	1
Mercer	0	–	1	–	0	0	–	1	–	0
Nashville	0	–	2	–	0	1	–	3	–	0
LSU	0	–	5	–	0	4	–	5	–	0
SW Presbyterian			–					–
+ – Conference co-champions

The 1903 Southern Intercollegiate Athletic Association football season was the college football games played by the member schools of the Southern Intercollegiate Athletic Association as part of the 1903 college football season. The season began on September 25.

1903 met difficulty in determining an SIAA champion. Clemson had the best record, but lost to an inferior North Carolina team; and in the game to secure the SIAA title were tied by Cumberland. Clemson's John Heisman pushed strongly for Cumberland to share the SIAA title. Cumberland's strongest victory was its win over Vanderbilt.

However, Sewanee beat Cumberland, yet suffered its only loss to Vanderbilt. Heisman originally challenged the winner of the Vanderbilt-Sewanee game. John J. Tigert was a star player for Vanderbilt. Nash Buckingham rated Kentucky University and Vanderbilt as best in the south.

== Season overview ==
=== Results and team statistics ===
Conf. Rank	Team	Head coach	Overall record	Conf. record	PPG	PAG
1 (tie)	Clemson	John Heisman	4–1–1	2–0–1	27.8	3.7
1 (tie)	Cumberland	A. L. Phillips	6–1–1	4–1–1	**38.5**	2.2
3	Sewanee	George S. Whitney	7–1	5–1	22.4	**1.2**
4	Vanderbilt	James H. Henry	6–1–1	5–1–1	24.0	2.0
5	Mississippi A&M	Daniel S. Martin	3–0–2	2–0–2	14.2	**1.2**
6	Georgia	Marvin D. Dickinson	3–4	3–2	9.3	14.0
7	Mississippi	M. S. Harvey	2–1–1	1–1–1	8.5	9.8
8	Texas	Ralph Hutchinson	5–1–2	0–0–1	16.4	3.5
9	Kentucky State	Jack Wright	7–1	0–0		
10	Alabama	W. A. Blount	3–4	3–4	8.6	16.3
11	Auburn	William Penn Bates	4–3	2–3	17.9	13.1
12 (tie)	Tennessee	H. F. Fisher	4–5	2–4	8.4	12.2
12 (tie)	Georgia Tech	Oliver Huie	4–5	1–4	8.4	21.1
14 (tie)	Tulane	Charles Eshleman	2–2–1	0–1–1	12.8	11.2
14 (tie)	Mercer		0–1	0–1	0.0	46.0
16	Nashville	Wreidt/Bradley Walker/Childress	2–2	0–2	10.8	5.3
17	LSU	W. S. Borland	4–5	0–4	7.8	10.3

Key

PPG = Average of points scored per game
PAG = Average of points allowed per game

=== Regular season ===
Index to colors and formatting
Non-conference matchup; SIAA member won
Non-conference matchup; SIAA member lost
Non-conference matchup; tie
Conference matchup

SIAA teams in bold.

==== Week One ====
Date	Visiting team	Home team	Site	Result	Attendance	Reference
September 25	Cynthiana	**Kentucky State**	State College Park • Lexington, KY	**W** 39–0		

==== Week Two ====
Date	Visiting team	Home team	Site	Result	Attendance	Reference
October 3	Montgomery Athletic Club	**Auburn**	Drill Field • Auburn, AL	**W** 26–0		
October 3	**Cumberland**	**Vanderbilt**	Dudley Field • Nashville, TN	**CUM** 6–0		
October 3	Mooney	**Sewanee**	Hardee Field • Sewanee, TN	**W** 23–0		
October 3	Texas Deaf School	**Texas**	Varsity Athletic Field • Austin, TX	**W** 17–0		
October 3	Maryville (TN)	**Tennessee**	Baldwin Park • Knoxville, TN	**W** 17–0		

==== Week Three ====
Date	Visiting team	Home team	Site	Result	Attendance	Reference
October 9	Haskell	Texas	State Fairgrounds • Dallas, TX	**L** 6–0	3,000	
October 10	**Clemson**	Georgia	Herty Field • Athens, GA	**CLEM** 29–0		
October 10	**Mercer**	Georgia Tech	Piedmont Park • Atlanta, GA	**GT** 46–0		
October 10	Carson–Newman	Tennessee	Baldwiin Park • Knoxville, TN	**W** 38–0		
October 10	**Alabama**	Vanderbilt	Dudley Field • Nashville, TN	**VAN** 30–0	1,000	
October 10	Berea	Kentucky State	State College Park • Lexington, KY	**W** 17–0		

==== Week Four ====
Date	Time	Visiting team	Home team	Site	Result	Attendance	Reference
October 14		LSU Alumni	**LSU**	State Field • Baton Rouge, LA	**W** 16–0		
October 16		**Alabama**	**Mississippi A&M**	Columbus Fairgrounds • Columbus, MS	**MSA&M** 11–0	5,000	
October 17		Howard (AL)	**Auburn**	Drill Field • Auburn, AL	**W** 58–0		
October 17		**Clemson**	**Georgia Tech**	Piedmont Park • Atlanta, GA	**CLEM** 73–0		
October 17		Kentucky Military Institute	**Kentucky State**	State College Park • Lexington, KY	**W** 18–0		
October 17		Oklahoma	**Texas**	Varsity Athletic Field • Austin, TX	**T** 6–6		
October 17		South Carolina	**Georgia**	Herty Field • Athens, GA	**L** 27–7		
October 17		**Tennessee**	**Vanderbilt**	Dudley Field • Nashville, TN	**VAN** 40–0		
October 17		**Nashville**	Mooney School	Mooney Field • Murfreesboro, TN	**L** 5–17		
October 20	3:00 p. m.	**Cumberland**	**Sewanee**	Hardee Field • Sewanee, TN	**SEW** 6–0		

==== Week Five ====
Date	Visiting team	Home team	Site	Result	Attendance	Reference
October 23	**Auburn**	**Alabama**	Riverside Park • Montgomery, AL	**ALA** 18–0	1,200	
October 24	**Georgia**	**Georgia Tech**	Piedmont Park • Atlanta, GA	**UGA** 38–0		
October 24	Baylor	**Texas**	Varsity Athletic Field • Austin, TX	**W** 48–0		
October 24	**Ole Miss**	**Vanderbilt**	Dudley Field • Nashville, TN	**VAN** 33–0		
October 24	**Mississippi A&M**	Meridian Athletic Club	Meridian, MS	**W** 43–0		
October 24	Eagles-New Orleans	**LSU**	State Field • Baton Rouge, LA	**W** 33–0		
October 24	Miami (OH)	**Kentucky State**	State College Park • Lexington, KY	**W** 47–0		
October 24	Tennessee Docs	**Sewanee**	Hardee Field • Sewanee, TN	**W** 52–0		

==== Week Six ====
Date	Visiting team	Home team	Site	Result	Attendance	Reference
October 28	North Carolina A&M	**Clemson**	Columbia, SC	**W** 24–0		
October 29	**Tennessee**	South Carolina	State Fairgrounds • Columbia, SC	**L** 0–24		
October 30	**LSU**	Louisiana Industrial	Ruston, LA	**W** 16–0		
October 30	Arkansas	**Texas**	Varsity Athletic Field • Austin, TX	**W** 15–0	800	
October 31	**LSU**	Shreveport Athletic Association	Ball Park • Shreveport, LA	**W** 5–0		
October 31	**Georgia Tech**	Howard (AL)	West End Park • Birmingham, AL	**W** 37–0		
October 31	**Sewanee**	**Auburn**	Oak Park • Montgomery, AL	**SEW** 47–0		
October 31	**Tennessee**	**Nashville**	Peabody Field • Nashville, TN	**TENN** 10–0		
October 31	**Vanderbilt**	**Georgia**	Brisbine Park • Atlanta, GA	**VAN** 33–0		
October 31	Meridian Athletic Club	**Tulane**	Athletic Park • New Orleans, LA	**W** 46–0	400	
November 2	**Sewanee**	**Alabama**	West End Park • Birmingham, AL	**SEW** 23–0	2,400	
November 2	Georgetown (KY)	**Kentucky State**	State College Park • Lexington, KY	**W** 51–0		
November 2	Tennessee Docs	**Cumberland**	Lebanon, TN	**W** 86–0		

==== Week Seven ====
Date	Visiting team	Home team	Site	Result	Attendance	Reference
November 6	**Vanderbilt**	**Texas**	Varsity Athletic Field • Austin, TX	**T** 5–5	1,200	
November 7	**Georgia**	**Tennessee**	Baldwin Park • Knoxville, TN	**UGA** 5–0		
November 7	**Sewanee**	**Nashville**	Peabody Field • Nashville, TN	**SEW** 6–0		
November 7	Florida State College	**Georgia Tech**	Piedmont Park • Atlanta, GA	**W** 17–0		
November 7	Shreveport Athletic Club	**Tulane**	Athletic Park • New Orleans, LA	**L** 0–23		
November 7	Marietta	**Kentucky State**	State College Park • Lexington, KY	**W** 11–0		
November 7	**Ole Miss**	Tennessee Docs	Red Elm Park • Memphis, TN	**W** 17–0		
November 7	**LSU**	**Mississippi A&M**	Starkville Fairgrounds • Starkville, MS	**MSA&M** 11–0		
November 7	Grant University of Athens	**Cumberland**	Lebanon, TN	**W** 92–0		
November 9	**LSU**	**Alabama**	The Quad • Tuscaloosa, AL	**ALA** 18–0		

==== Week Eight ====
Date	Visiting team	Home team	Site	Result	Attendance	Reference
November 11	**LSU**	**Auburn**	Drill Field • Auburn, AL	**AUB** 12–0		
November 13	**Texas**	Oklahoma	Colcord Park • Oklahoma City, Oklahoma Territory	**W** 11–5		
November 13	Tennessee Medicos	**Nashville**	Peabody Field • Nashville, TN	**W** 26–0		
November 14	**Auburn**	**Georgia Tech**	Piedmont Park • Atlanta, GA	**AUB** 10–5		
November 14	**Cumberland**	**Alabama**	The Quad • Tuscaloosa, AL	**CUM** 44–0		
November 14	**Clemson**	North Carolina	Campus Athletic Field • Chapel Hill, NC	**L** 6–11		
November 14	**Sewanee**	**Tennessee**	Baldwin Park • Knoxville, TN	**SEW** 17–0		
November 14	Washington University	**Vanderbilt**	Dudley Field • Nashville, TN	**W** 41–0		
November 14	**Georgia**	Savannah Athletic Association	Bolton Street Park • Savannah, GA	**L** 0–6		
November 14	**Mississippi A&M**	**Ole Miss**	University Park • Oxford, MS	**T** 6–6		
November 16	**Cumberland**	**LSU**	State Field • Baton Rouge, LA	**CUM** 41–0		

==== Week Nine ====
Date	Visiting team	Home team	Site	Result	Attendance	Reference
November 18	**Cumberland**	**Tulane**	Athletic Park • New Orleans, LA	**CUM** 28–0		
November 21	**Clemson**	Davidson	Latta Park • Charlotte, NC	**W** 24–0		
November 21	**Georgia Tech**	**Tennessee**	Baldwin Park • Knoxville, TN	**TENN** 11–0		
November 21	**Ole Miss**	**LSU**	Athletic Park • New Orleans, LA	**LSU** 11–0		
November 21	**Sewanee**	**Vanderbilt**	Dudley Field • Nashville, TN	**VAN** 10–5	4,000	

==== Week Ten ====
Date	Visiting team	Home team	Site	Result	Attendance	Reference
November 26	**Tennessee**	Alabama	West End Park • Birmingham, AL	**ALA** 24–0		
November 26	**Auburn**	Georgia	Brisbine Park • Atlanta, GA	**UGA** 22–13		
November 26	South Carolina	Georgia Tech	Piedmont Park • Atlanta, GA	**L** 0–16		
November 26	Kentucky University	Kentucky State	South Side Park • Lexington, KY	**L** 0–17		
November 26	Richmond	Tulane	Athletic Field • New Orleans, LA	**W** 18–5		
November 29	Texas A&M	Texas	Varsity Athletic Field • Austin, TX	**W** 29–6		

==== Week Eleven ====
Date	Visiting team	Home team	Site	Result	Attendance	Reference
December 5	**Mississippi A&M**	**Tulane**	Athletic Field • New Orleans, LA	**T** 0–0		

=== Postseason ===
==== SIAA Championship Game ====
Date	Time	Visiting team	Home team	Site	Result	Attendance	Reference
November 26	3:00 p. m.	**Cumberland**	**Clemson**	Oak Park • Montgomery, AL	**T** 11–11		

== All-Southern team ==
Walker Reynolds Tichenor's All-Southern team:

Position	Name	Team
QB	John Maxwell	Clemson
HB	John J. Tigert	Vanderbilt
HB	J. C. Anderson	Cumberland
FB	Jock Hanvey	Clemson
E	Bob Blake	Vanderbilt
T	Joseph Lee Kirby-Smith	Sewanee
G	Henry D. Phillips	Sewanee
C	Red Smith	Cumberland
G	Puss Derrick	Clemson
G/T	Marvin O. Bridges	Cumberland
E	Carl Sitton	Clemson
