= Cumberland Phoenix football =

Football team of Cumberland University

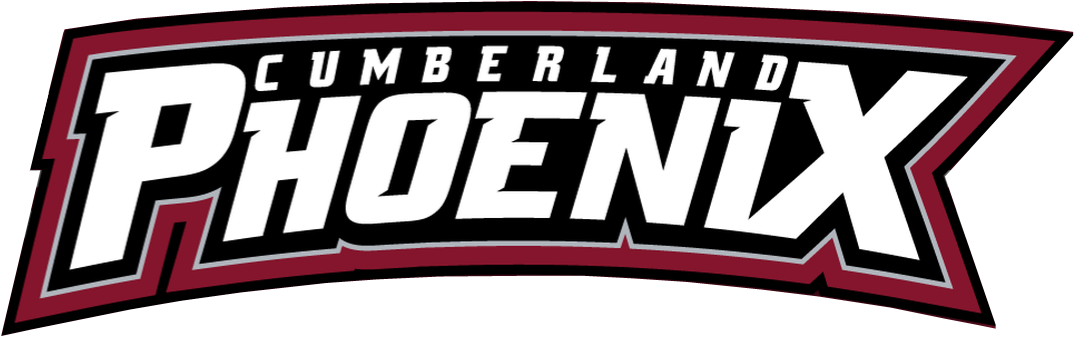
- First season: 1894; 132 years ago
- Athletic director: Ron Pavan
- Head coach: Tim Mathis; 6th season, 24–34 (.414)
- Location: Lebanon, Tennessee
- Stadium: Nokes-Lasater Field
- Conference: Mid-South Conference
- Colors: Cardinal and white

Conference championships
- 2
- Website: gocumberlandathletics.com

The Cumberland Phoenix football team represents Cumberland University in National Association of Intercollegiate Athletics (NAIA), primarily competing in the Mid-South Conference. The Phoenix formerly competed in the TranSouth Athletic Conference and Southern Intercollegiate Athletic Association.

== History ==
Cumberland football began on October 26, 1894 with a 6–6 tie with Peabody and finished that first year with a 2–1–1 season record.

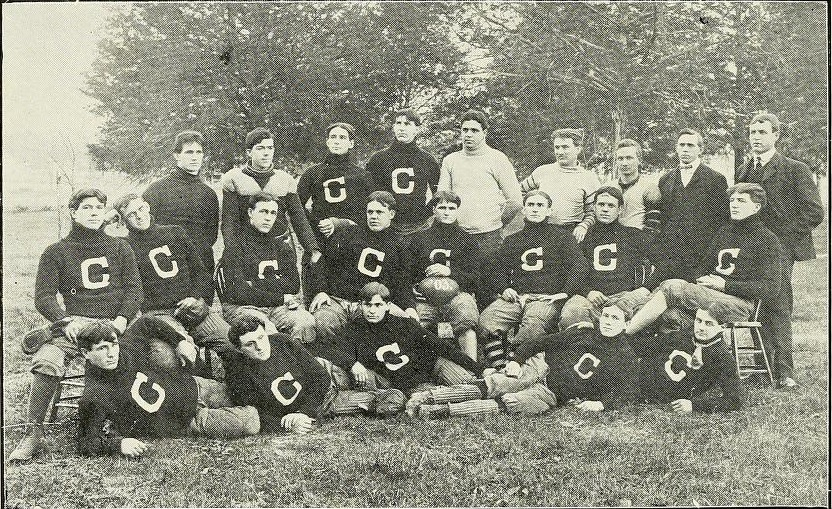
Cumberland team of 1903

The early days of Cumberland football were very promising. The 1901 team played three games, with one recorded loss, but the following year, the 1902 team had a 3-5 record, with a victory over Mississippi A&M (now Mississippi State University).

The pinnacle of the early days of CU football was the 1903 team. The season that began with a (6–0) win over Vanderbilt then a (0–6) loss to Sewanee and continued with a five-day road trip with victories over Alabama (44–0) November 14, 1903, LSU (41–0) November 16, 1903, and Tulane (28–0) November 18, 1903. Cumberland would play a postseason game against Coach John Heisman's Clemson team on Thanksgiving Day that ended in an 11–11 tie and a record of 4–1–1 which gave Coach A. L. Phillips and Cumberland University the Championship of the Southern Intercollegiate Athletic Association.

The 1904 team went 3–1, a victory over Mississippi A&M (now Mississippi State University). The 1905 team had a 3–4 record, with victories over Georgia and Ole Miss.

The 1916 game against Georgia Tech is famous as the most lopsided-scoring game in the history of college football; Georgia Tech defeated Cumberland by a score of 222–0.

In 2001, Jacksonville State University Gamecocks placekicker Ashley Martin became the first woman to play and score in an NCAA Division I football game when she kicked an extra point in the first quarter of a game against Cumberland.

For the 2008 season, CU's football earned a share of the Mid-South Conference West Division.

In 2016, the team changed its name from Bulldogs to the Phoenix.

== Conference championships ==
Year	Conference	Coach	Overall record	Conference record
1903	Southern Intercollegiate Athletic Association	A. L. Phillips	6–1–1	4–1–1
1935	Smoky Mountain Conference	Gus Morrow	7–3	5–0

== Notable individual achievements ==
Cumberland Athletics Hall of Fame

- Joe Black Hayes
- Garland Morrow
- Thug Murray
- Red Smith

All-Southerns

- 1903: J. C. Anderson, halfback
- 1903: Marvin O. Bridges, guard
- 1903: Red Smith, center
- 1904: Willard Steele, halfback
- 1905: Red Smith, center
