= Hope Sadler =

American football player (1882–1931)

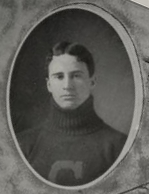
- Sadler in The Oroneean, 1903

Profile
- Position: End

Personal information
- Born: October 12, 1882; York County, South Carolina, U.S.
- Died: August 29, 1931 (aged 48); Rock Hill, South Carolina, U.S.
- Listed weight: 154 lb (70 kg)

Career information
- College: Clemson (1900–1903)

Awards and highlights
- SIAA championship (1902, 1903); All-Southern (1902, 1903)

David Hope Sadler (October 12, 1882 – August 29, 1931) was an American football player for John Heisman's Clemson Tigers of Clemson University. He was captain of the SIAA champion 1902 and 1903 Clemson Tigers football teams coached by Heisman, selected All-Southern the same years. One publication reads "Vetter Sitton and Hope Sadler were the finest ends that Clemson ever had perhaps." Sitton played on the left; Sadler on the right.

== Early life ==
Sadler was born on October 12, 1882, in York County, South Carolina, to Rufus Earle Sadler and Lillian Emily Crawford.

== College football ==
In the "1903 SIAA championship game" against the Cumberland Bulldogs, which opened its season with an upset of Vanderbilt, the winning team was to be awarded the ball. The game ended in an 11–11 tie. Captain W. W. Suddarth of Cumberland wanted captain Sadler to get the ball, and Sadler insisted Suddarth should have it. Some ten minutes of bickering was resolved when the ball was given to patrolman Patrick J. Sweeney, for warning the media and fans to stay down in front and allow spectators to see the game.

== High school football ==
Sadler coached the University School for Boys in Stone Mountain, Georgia, in 1904. Later Oglethorpe coach Frank B. Anderson was an assistant.
