= W. W. Suddarth =

American football player and minister (1880–1971)

- Church: Presbyterian

Orders
- Ordination: 1906

Personal details
- Born: November 18, 1880
- Died: March 15, 1971 (aged 90) Lebanon, Tennessee, U.S.

William Wallace Suddarth, II (November 18, 1880 – March 15, 1971) was a Presbyterian minister and college football player.

== College ==
Suddarth attended Cumberland University from 1900 to 1905. He was captain and lineman on one of the school's best football teams in 1903. That team beat Vanderbilt and tied John Heisman's Clemson. In the tie with Clemson, the winning team was to be awarded the ball. Captain Suddarth wanted captain Hope Sadler of Clemson to get the ball, and Sadler insisted Suddarth should have it. Some ten minutes of bickering was resolved when the ball was given to patrolman Patrick J. Sweeney, for warning the media and fans to stay down in front and allow spectators to see the game. Suddarth was selected to Nash Buckingham's All-Southern team in the Memphis Commercial Appeal. He was inducted into the Cumberland Sports Hall of Fame in 1977.

== Ministry ==
Ordained in 1906, he served churches in the Middle Tennessee area on a full-time basis from 1906 to 1957, and continued to preach on a supply basis after retirement.
