= 1903 Cumberland Bulldogs football team =

American college football season

1903 Cumberland Bulldogs football
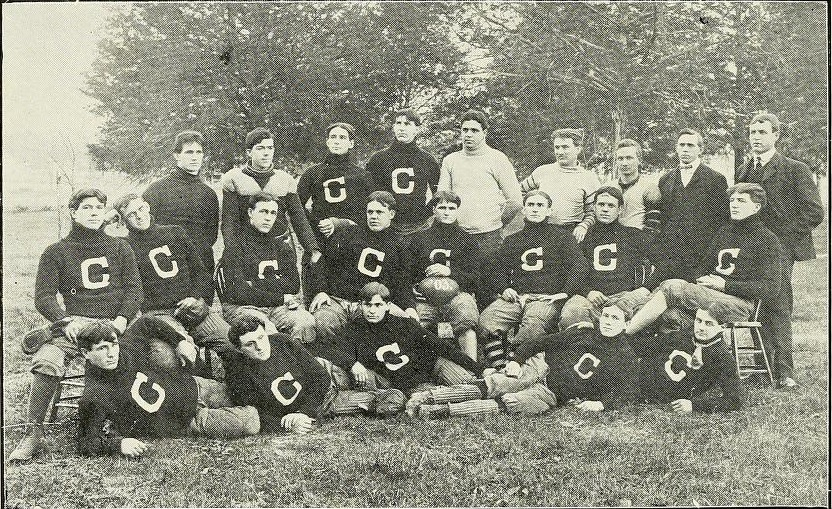

SIAA co-champion
- Conference: Southern Intercollegiate Athletic Association
- Record: 6–1–1 (4–1–1 SIAA)
- Head coach: A. L. Phillips (2nd season)
- Captain: W. W. Suddarth

1903 Southern Intercollegiate Athletic Association football standings
| | Conf. | | | | | Overall |
| Team | W | | L | | T | W | | L | | T |
|---|---|---|---|---|---|---|---|---|---|---|
| Clemson + | 2 | – | 0 | – | 1 | 4 | – | 1 | – | 1 |
| Cumberland (TN) + | 4 | – | 1 | – | 1 | 6 | – | 1 | – | 1 |
| Sewanee | 5 | – | 1 | – | 0 | 7 | – | 1 | – | 0 |
| Vanderbilt | 5 | – | 1 | – | 1 | 6 | – | 1 | – | 1 |
| Mississippi A&M | 2 | – | 0 | – | 2 | 3 | – | 0 | – | 2 |
| Georgia | 3 | – | 2 | – | 0 | 3 | – | 4 | – | 0 |
| Ole Miss | 1 | – | 1 | – | 1 | 2 | – | 1 | – | 1 |
| Texas | 0 | – | 0 | – | 1 | 5 | – | 1 | – | 2 |
| Kentucky State | 0 | – | 0 | – | 0 | 6 | – | 1 | – | 0 |
| Alabama | 3 | – | 4 | – | 0 | 3 | – | 4 | – | 0 |
| Auburn | 2 | – | 3 | – | 0 | 4 | – | 3 | – | 0 |
| Tennessee | 2 | – | 4 | – | 0 | 4 | – | 5 | – | 0 |
| Georgia Tech | 1 | – | 4 | – | 0 | 3 | – | 5 | – | 0 |
| Tulane | 0 | – | 1 | – | 1 | 2 | – | 2 | – | 1 |
| Mercer | 0 | – | 1 | – | 0 | 0 | – | 1 | – | 0 |
| Nashville | 0 | – | 2 | – | 0 | 1 | – | 3 | – | 0 |
| LSU | 0 | – | 5 | – | 0 | 4 | – | 5 | – | 0 |
| SW Presbyterian | | | – | | | | | – |
+ – Conference co-champions

The 1903 Cumberland Bulldogs football team represented Cumberland University in the 1903 college football season. The team was a member of the Southern Intercollegiate Athletic Association (SIAA), compiling a 6–1–1 record. The Bulldogs notably beat Vanderbilt and tied John Heisman's Clemson at year's end in a game billed as the "SIAA Championship Game." They also beat Alabama, LSU, and Tulane in five days. The school claims a share of the SIAA title. It has been called "the best football team in the history of Cumberland."

== Schedule ==
| Date | Time | Opponent | Site | Result | Source |
|---|---|---|---|---|---|
| October 3 | 3:00 p.m. | at Vanderbilt | Dudley Field; Nashville, TN | W 6–0 | |
| October 20 | 3:00 p.m. | at Sewanee | Hardee Field; Sewanee, TN | L 0–6 | |
| November 2 | | Tennessee Docs* | Lebanon, TN | W 86–0 | |
| November 7 | | Grant University of Athens* | Lebanon, TN | W 92–0 | |
| November 14 | | at Alabama | The Quad; Tuscaloosa, AL | W 44–0 | |
| November 16 | 3:00 p.m. | at LSU | State Field; Baton Rouge, LA | W 41–0 | |
| November 18 | 3:30 p.m. | at Tulane | Athletic Park; New Orleans, LA | W 28–0 | |
| November 26 | | vs. Clemson | Oak Park; Montgomery, AL | T 11–11 | |
*Non-conference game; All times are in Central time

Games with Kentucky State College and Kentucky University were canceled.

== Before the season ==
For the 1903 season, point values were different from those used in contemporary games. In 1903 a touchdown was worth five points, a field goal was worth five points and a conversion (PAT) was worth one point.

== Game summaries ==
=== At Vanderbilt ===
Cumberland at Vanderbilt

| Team | 1 | 2 | Total |
|---|---|---|---|
| • Cumberland | 6 | 0 | 6 |
| Vanderbilt | 0 | 0 | 0 |

- Date: October 3
- Location: Nashville, Tennessee
- Game start: 3:00 p. m.
- Referee: Wreidt

Cumberland upset the Vanderbilt Commodores 6–0. Four minutes after the game started, Waterhouse had the decisive touchdown. M. O. Bridges had his right collarbone broken.

The starting lineup was Waterhouse (left end), M. L. Bridges (left tackle), James (left guard), Smith (center), Cragwall (right guard), Suddarth (right tackle), Spencer (right end), Smiser (quarterback), Head (left halfback), Newton (right halfback), M. O. Bridges (fullback).

=== Sewanee ===
Cumberland at Sewanee

| Team | 1 | 2 | Total |
|---|---|---|---|
| Cumberland | 0 | 0 | 0 |
| • Sewanee | 0 | 6 | 6 |

- Date: October 20
- Location: Sewanee, Tennessee
- Game start: 3:00 p. m.
- Referee: Roszel

Cumberland suffered the season's only loss to the Sewanee Tigers. Henry D. Phillips plowed through the line for the deciding score.

The starting lineup was Waterhouse (left end), M. L. Bridges (left tackle), James (left guard), Smith (center), Cragwall (right guard), Suddarth (right tackle), Spencer (right end), Smiser (quarterback), Head (left halfback), Anderson (right halfback), Minton (fullback).

=== Tennessee Medical College ===
Cumberland defeated Tennessee Medical College 86–0. Spencer scored three touchdowns.

=== Grant University ===
Cumberland then walloped Grant University of Athens 92–0.

=== Alabama ===
To close the regular season, Cumberland beat Alabama, LSU, and Tulane all by shutout in five days. Red Smith and Head starred in the 44–0 defeat of Alabama. Cumberland outweighed Alabama by an average of nearly 30 pounds.

The starting lineup was Waterhouse (left end), M. L. Bridges (left tackle), M. O. Bridges (left guard), Smith (center), Cragwall (right guard), Suddarth (right tackle), Spencer (right end), Smiser (quarterback), Head (left halfback), Anderson (right halfback), Minton (fullback).

=== LSU ===
Cumberland at LSU

| Team | 1 | 2 | Total |
|---|---|---|---|
| • Cumberland | 18 | 23 | 41 |
| LSU | 0 | 0 | 0 |

- Date: November 16
- Location: Baton Rouge, Louisiana
- Game start: 3:00 p. m.
- Referee: Connell

Just two days later, Cumberland beat W. S. Borland's LSU Tigers 41–0. The starting lineup was Ashley (left end), M. O. Bridges (left tackle), Lieper (left guard), Smith (center), Cragwall (right guard), Suddarth (right tackle), Sanders (right end), Smiser (quarterback), Head (left halfback), Anderson (right halfback), Minton (fullback).

=== Tulane ===
Two days later still, Cumberland outweighed and defeated Tulane 28–0. The starting lineup was Waterhouse (left end), M. L. Bridges (left tackle), M. O. Bridges (left guard), Smith (center), Lieper (right guard), Suddarth (right tackle), Spencer (right end), Smiser (quarterback), Anderson (left halfback), Head (right halfback), Minton (fullback).

== Postseason ==
=== "SIAA championship game" ===
Clemson vs. Cumberland

| Team | 1 | 2 | Total |
|---|---|---|---|
| Clemson | 0 | 11 | 11 |
| Cumberland | 11 | 0 | 11 |

- Date: November 26
- Location: Montgomery, Alabama
- Referee: W. R. Tichenor

Cumberland tied John Heisman's Clemson Tigers in a game billed as the SIAA championship. Cumberland rushed out to an early 11 to 0 lead. Wiley Lee Umphlett in Creating the Big Game: John W. Heisman and the Invention of American Football writes, "During the first half, Clemson was never really in the game due mainly to formidable line play of the Bridges brothers–giants in their day at 6 feet 4 inches–and a big center named "Red" Smith, was all over the field backing up the Cumberland line on defense. Clemson had been outweighed before, but certainly not like this."

A contemporary account reads "The Clemson players seemed mere dwarfs as they lined up for the kickoff. To the crowd on the sidelines it didn't seem that Heisman's charges could possibly do more than give a gallant account of themselves in a losing battle." A touchdown was scored by fullback E. L. Minton (touchdowns were worth 5 points). Guard M. O. Bridges kicked the extra point. Halfback J. A. Head made another touchdown, but Bridges missed the try.

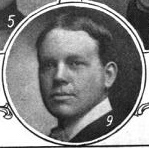
M. O. Bridges

After halftime, Clemson quarterback John Maxwell raced 100 yards for a touchdown. Clemson missed the try. Cumberland fumbled a punt and Clemson recovered. Cumberland expected a trick play when Fritz Furtick simply ran up the middle and scored. One account of the play reads "Heisman saw his chance to exploit a weakness in the Cumberland defense: run the ball where the ubiquitous Red Smith wasn't. So the next time Sitton started out on one of his slashing end runs, at the last second he tossed he ball back to the fullback who charges straight over center (where Smith would have been except that he was zeroing in on the elusive Sitton) and went all the way for he tying touchdown." Jock Hanvey kicked the extra point and the game ended in an 11–11 tie. The winning team was to be awarded the ball. Captain W. W. Suddarth of Cumberland wanted captain Hope Sadler of Clemson to get the ball, and Sadler insisted Suddarth should have it. Some ten minutes of bickering was resolved when the ball was given to patrolman Patrick J. Sweeney, for warning the media and fans to stay down in front and allow spectators to see the game. Heisman pushed for Cumberland to be named SIAA champions at year's end, and the school claims a share of the title. It was Heisman's last game as Clemson head coach.

The starting lineup was Waterhouse (left end), M. L. Bridges (left tackle), M. O. Bridges (left guard), Smith (center), Cragwall (right guard), Suddarth (right tackle), Spencer (right end), Smiser (quarterback), Head (left halfback), Anderson (right halfback), Minton (fullback).

== Players ==
=== Line ===
| Player | Position | Games started | Hometown | Prep school | Height | Weight | Age |
|---|---|---|---|---|---|---|---|
| Milton L. Bridges | tackle | | Cornersville, Tennessee | | 6'4" | 225 | |
| Marvin O. Bridges | guard | | Cornersville, Tennessee | | 6'4" | 200 | 25 |
| William Cragwell | guard | | | | | 175 | |
| E. C. Lieper | guard | | | | | 186 | |
| Red Smith | center | | | Mooney | 6'0" | 170 | 22 |
| Collis M. Spencer | end | | | | | 136 | |
| W. W. Suddarth | tackle | | | Castle Heights | | 170 | 23 |
| Clarence E. Waterhouse | end | | | | | 150 | |

=== Backfield ===
| Player | Position | Games started | Hometown | Prep school | Height | Weight | Age |
|---|---|---|---|---|---|---|---|
| J. C. Anderson | halfback | | | | | 170 | |
| J. Allen Head | halfback | | | Mooney | | 160 | |
| E. L. Minton | fullback | | | Jackson | | 165 | |
| Booker Smiser | quarterback | | | Mooney | | 150 | |

== Awards and honors ==
- Captain: W. W. Suddarth
- All-Southern: M. O. Bridges, W. W. Suddarth, Red Smith, J. C. Anderson.

== Sources ==
- Woodruff, Fuzzy (1928). A History of Southern Football 1890–1928. Vol. 1.
- "Football Team: Team of '03". The Phoenix. Lebanon, Tennessee: Students of Cumberland University. 1904. pp. 118–121 – via Internet Archive.
