= 1903 Auburn Tigers football team =

American college football season

1903 Auburn Tigers football
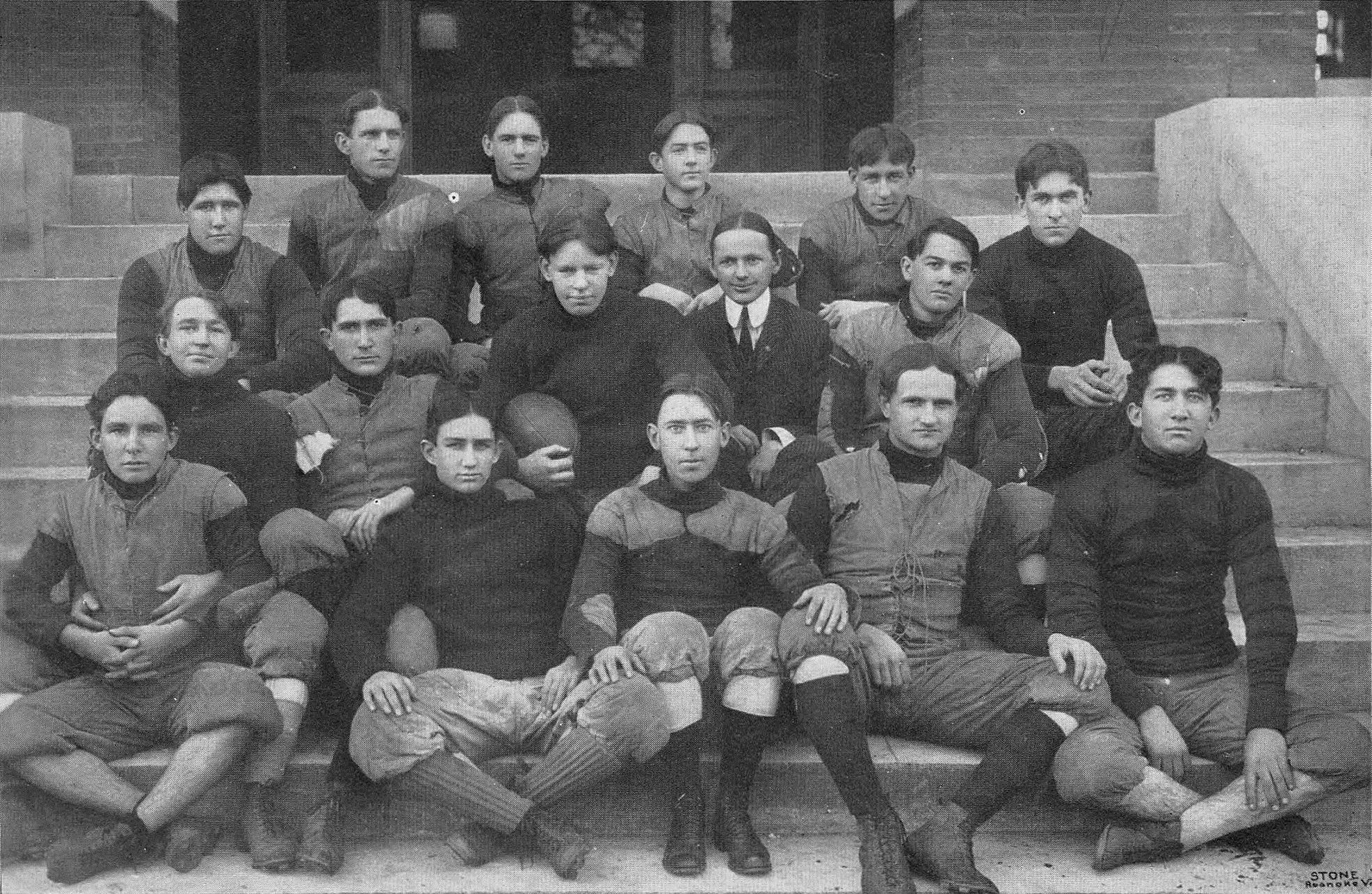
- The 1903 football team of the Alabama Polytechnic Institute (now Auburn University).
- Conference: Southern Intercollegiate Athletic Association
- Record: 4–3 (2–3 SIAA)
- Head coach: William Penn Bates (1st season)
- Captain: James P. Paterson
- Home stadium: Drill Field

1903 Southern Intercollegiate Athletic Association football standings
	Conf.					Overall
Team	W		L		T	W		L		T
Clemson +	2	–	0	–	1	4	–	1	–	1
Cumberland (TN) +	4	–	1	–	1	6	–	1	–	1
Sewanee	5	–	1	–	0	7	–	1	–	0
Vanderbilt	5	–	1	–	1	6	–	1	–	1
Mississippi A&M	2	–	0	–	2	3	–	0	–	2
Georgia	3	–	2	–	0	3	–	4	–	0
Ole Miss	1	–	1	–	1	2	–	1	–	1
Texas	0	–	0	–	1	5	–	1	–	2
Kentucky State	0	–	0	–	0	6	–	1	–	0
Alabama	3	–	4	–	0	3	–	4	–	0
Auburn	2	–	3	–	0	4	–	3	–	0
Tennessee	2	–	4	–	0	4	–	5	–	0
Georgia Tech	1	–	4	–	0	3	–	5	–	0
Tulane	0	–	1	–	1	2	–	2	–	1
Mercer	0	–	1	–	0	0	–	1	–	0
Nashville	0	–	2	–	0	1	–	3	–	0
LSU	0	–	5	–	0	4	–	5	–	0
SW Presbyterian			–					–
+ – Conference co-champions

The 1903 Auburn Tigers football team represented Auburn University in the 1903 college football season. The team was coached by William Penn Bates in his only season as Auburn's head coach. The next year Mike Donahue took over for the first of his two coaching stints at Auburn.

== Schedule ==
Date	Opponent	Site	Result	Source
October 3	Montgomery Athletic Club*	Drill Field; Auburn, AL	W 26–0	
October 17	Howard (AL)*	Drill Field; Auburn, AL	W 58–0	
October 23	vs. Alabama	Riverside Park; Montgomery, AL (rivalry)	L 6–18	
October 31	Sewanee	Riverside Park; Montgomery, AL	L 0–47	
November 11	LSU	Drill Field; Auburn, AL (rivalry)	W 12–0	
November 14	at Georgia Tech	Piedmont Park; Atlanta, GA (rivalry)	W 10–5	
November 26	at Georgia	Brisbane Park; Atlanta, GA (rivalry)	L 13–22	
*Non-conference game
