= 1903 Georgia Tech football team =

American college football season

1903 Georgia Tech football
- Conference: Southern Intercollegiate Athletic Association
- Record: 3–5 (1–4 SIAA)
- Head coach: Oliver Huie (1st season)
- Captain: Jesse Thrash
- Home stadium: Piedmont Park

1903 Southern Intercollegiate Athletic Association football standings
	Conf.					Overall
Team	W		L		T	W		L		T
Clemson +	2	–	0	–	1	4	–	1	–	1
Cumberland (TN) +	4	–	1	–	1	6	–	1	–	1
Sewanee	5	–	1	–	0	7	–	1	–	0
Vanderbilt	5	–	1	–	1	6	–	1	–	1
Mississippi A&M	2	–	0	–	2	3	–	0	–	2
Georgia	3	–	2	–	0	3	–	4	–	0
Ole Miss	1	–	1	–	1	2	–	1	–	1
Texas	0	–	0	–	1	5	–	1	–	2
Kentucky State	0	–	0	–	0	6	–	1	–	0
Alabama	3	–	4	–	0	3	–	4	–	0
Auburn	2	–	3	–	0	4	–	3	–	0
Tennessee	2	–	4	–	0	4	–	5	–	0
Georgia Tech	1	–	4	–	0	3	–	5	–	0
Tulane	0	–	1	–	1	2	–	2	–	1
Mercer	0	–	1	–	0	0	–	1	–	0
Nashville	0	–	2	–	0	1	–	3	–	0
LSU	0	–	5	–	0	4	–	5	–	0
SW Presbyterian			–					–
+ – Conference co-champions

The 1903 Georgia Tech football team represented the Georgia Institute of Technology during the 1903 Southern Intercollegiate Athletic Association football season. Despite Tech sources not recording it, Mercer sources insist Georgia Tech defeated Mercer in 1903 by a score of 46 to 0.

== Schedule ==
Date	Opponent	Site	Result	Source
October 10	Mercer	Piedmont Park; Atlanta, GA	W 46–0	
October 17	Clemson	Piedmont Park; Atlanta, GA (rivalry)	L 0–73	
October 24	Georgia	Piedmont Park; Atlanta, GA (rivalry)	L 0–38	
October 31	at Howard (AL)*	West End Park; Birmingham, AL	W 37–0	
November 7	Florida State College*	Piedmont Park; Atlanta, GA	W 17–0	
November 14	Auburn	Piedmont Park; Atlanta, GA (rivalry)	L 5–10	
November 21	at Tennessee	Baldwin Park; Knoxville, TN (rivalry)	L 0–11	
November 26	South Carolina*	Piedmont Park; Atlanta, GA	L 0–16	
*Non-conference game

== Game summaries ==
=== Week 1: Clemson ===
Clemson's 73–0 victory over Georgia Tech led Clemson to name a street on the campus for John Heisman and to Georgia Tech's hiring him the next season. The week before Clemson beat Georgia 29 to 0. Georgia offered a bushel of apples for every point Clemson could score over its rival Tech. Clemson rushed for 615 yards.
