= Joe Black Hayes =

American football player and coach (1915–2013)

Profile
- Position: Guard

Personal information
- Born: September 20, 1915; Murfreesboro, Tennessee, U.S.
- Died: December 9, 2013 (aged 98); Murfreesboro, Tennessee, U.S.

Career information
- College: University of Tennessee

Career history

Playing
- 1935−1937: Tennessee

Coaching
- 1941−1943: Tennessee−Martin (assistant)
- 1946−1948: Cumberland
- 1949−1954: Middle Tennessee State (assistant)

Awards and highlights
- Cumberland Athletics Hall of Fame; MTSU Hall of Fame

Joe Black Hayes Sr. (September 20, 1915 – December 9, 2013) was an American football player and coach.

Born in Murfreesboro, Tennessee, Hayes played for the Tennessee Volunteers team. Hayes was an assistant coach under Charles "Bubber" Murphy for the Middle Tennessee State Blue Raiders team from 1935 to 1937. He was married to Karen of Murfreesboro, with whom he had two sons.

Hayes died on December 9, 2013, at the age of 98, in a nursing home in his hometown of Murfreesboro, Tennessee.
