= 1903 Texas Longhorns football team =

American college football season

1903 Texas Longhorns football
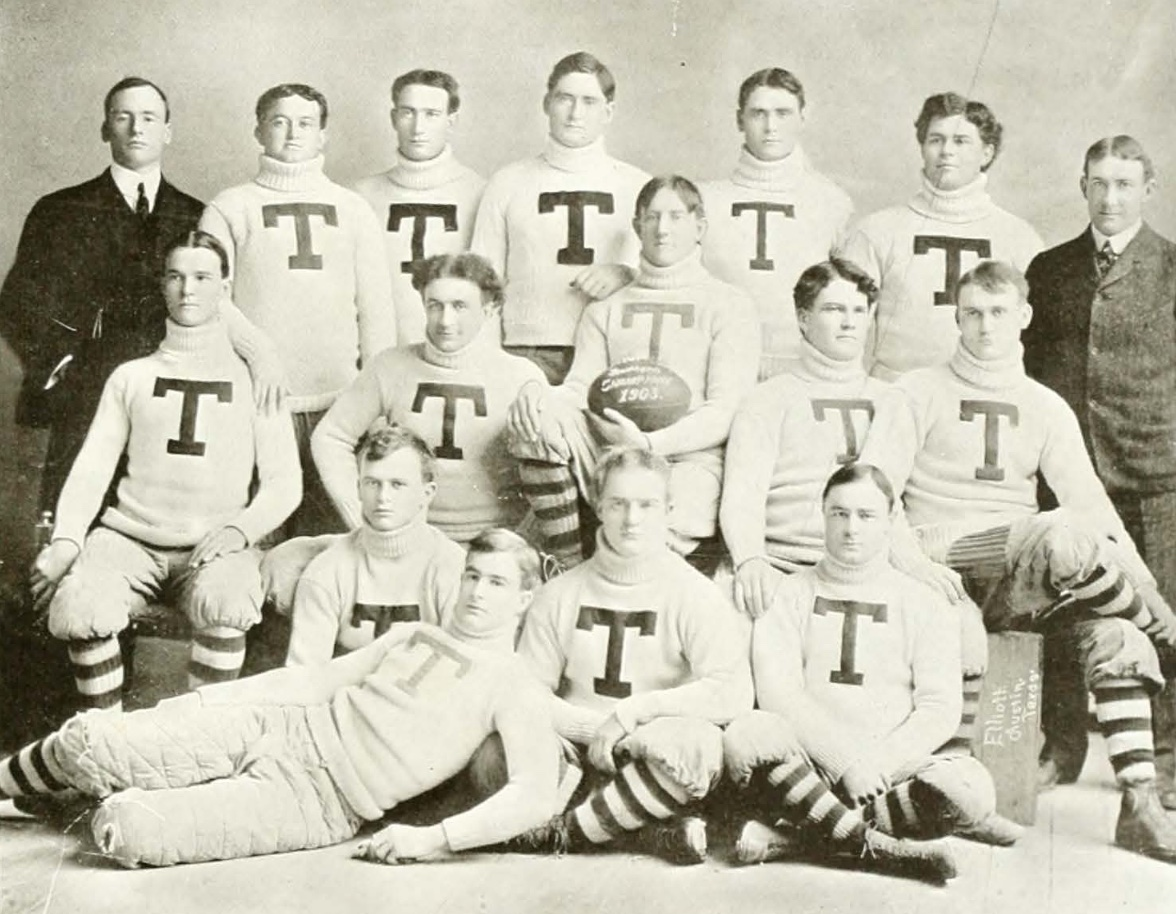
- Conference: Southern Intercollegiate Athletic Association
- Record: 5–1–2 (0–0–1 SIAA)
- Head coach: Ralph Hutchinson (1st season)
- Captain: R. G. Watson
- Home stadium: Varsity Athletic Field

1903 Southern Intercollegiate Athletic Association football standings
	Conf.					Overall
Team	W		L		T	W		L		T
Clemson +	2	–	0	–	1	4	–	1	–	1
Cumberland (TN) +	4	–	1	–	1	6	–	1	–	1
Sewanee	5	–	1	–	0	7	–	1	–	0
Vanderbilt	5	–	1	–	1	6	–	1	–	1
Mississippi A&M	2	–	0	–	2	3	–	0	–	2
Georgia	3	–	2	–	0	3	–	4	–	0
Ole Miss	1	–	1	–	1	2	–	1	–	1
Texas	0	–	0	–	1	5	–	1	–	2
Kentucky State	0	–	0	–	0	6	–	1	–	0
Alabama	3	–	4	–	0	3	–	4	–	0
Auburn	2	–	3	–	0	4	–	3	–	0
Tennessee	2	–	4	–	0	4	–	5	–	0
Georgia Tech	1	–	4	–	0	3	–	5	–	0
Tulane	0	–	1	–	1	2	–	2	–	1
Mercer	0	–	1	–	0	0	–	1	–	0
Nashville	0	–	2	–	0	1	–	3	–	0
LSU	0	–	5	–	0	4	–	5	–	0
SW Presbyterian			–					–
+ – Conference co-champions

The 1903 Texas 'Varsity football team, also popularized for the first time as the Longhorns by Daily Texan editor Alex Weisberg, represented The University of Texas (now known as the University of Texas at Austin) in the 1903 Southern Intercollegiate Athletic Association football season. In their first year under head coach Ralph Hutchinson, the Longhorns compiled an overall record of 5-1-2 (0-0-1 SIAA) and outscored their opponents 131-28.

== Schedule ==
Date	Time	Opponent	Site	Result	Attendance	Source
October 3		Texas School for the Deaf*	Varsity Athletic Field; Austin, TX	W 17–0		
October 9	3:00 p.m.	vs. Haskell*	State fair grounds; Dallas, TX	L 0–6	3,000	
October 17		Oklahoma*	Varsity Athletic Field; Austin, TX (Red River Rivalry)	T 6–6		
October 24		Baylor*	Varsity Athletic Field; Austin, TX (rivalry)	W 48–0		
October 29		Arkansas*	Varsity Athletic Field; Austin, TX (rivalry)	W 15–0	800	
November 6		Vanderbilt	Varsity Athletic Field; Austin, TX	T 5–5	1,200	
November 13		vs. Oklahoma*	Colcord Park; Oklahoma City, Oklahoma Territory	W 11–5	2,000	
November 26		Texas A&M*	Varsity Athletic Field; Austin, TX (rivalry)	W 29–6		
*Non-conference game

== Personnel ==
All players on the 1903 team, subs included, were awarded varsity letters.

=== Line ===
Player	Position	Games played	Home town	Height	Weight	Age	Letter #
Grover Jones	Left End	8	Houston, Texas	5'9"	150 lbs	19	1st
N.J. Marshall	Left Tackle	8	Bonham, Texas	6'2"	186 lbs	23	3rd
W.D. Scarbrough	Left Tackle	5	Abilene, Texas	5'10"	175 lbs	21	1st
Lucian W. Parrish	LG & C	8	Joy, Texas	6'2"	188 lbs	25	1st
B.L. Glasscock	Left Guard	3	Elgin, Texas	5'11"	190 lbs	20	1st
Dan J. Harrison	Center	6	Bartlett, Texas	5'10"	168 lbs	24	2nd
S.M. Adams	Right Guard	8	Nacogdoches, Texas	5'10"	180 lbs	26	1st
A.M. Frazier	Right Tackle	8	Brandon, Texas	6'1"	163 lbs	26	1st
Marrs McLean	Right End	8	Beaumont, Texas	6'0"	152 lbs	20	1st

=== Backfield ===
Player	Position	Games played	Home town	Height	Weight	Age	Letter #
S.S. Searcy	Quarterback	8	Brenham, Texas	4'11"	140 lbs	22	1st
Don Robinson	Left Halfback	8	Missoula, Montana	5'7"	158 lbs	23	1st
Rembert Watson	Right Halfback	7	Waxahachie, Texas	5'10"	160 lbs	22	3rd
W.J. Bowen	Right Halfback	8	Pleasanton, Texas	5'7"	132 lbs	22	1st
R.C. Pantermuehl	Fullback	8	New Braunfels, Texas	5'9"	160 lbs	22	1st
Edward Crane	Fullback	3	Dallas, Texas	5'10"	158 lbs	20	1st
