= 1903 Mississippi A&M Aggies football team =

American college football season

1903 Mississippi A&M Aggies football
- Conference: Southern Intercollegiate Athletic Association
- Record: 3–0–2 (2–0–2 SIAA)
- Head coach: Daniel S. Martin (1st season)
- Home stadium: Starkville Fairgrounds, Columbus Fairgrounds

1903 Southern Intercollegiate Athletic Association football standings
	Conf.					Overall
Team	W		L		T	W		L		T
Clemson +	2	–	0	–	1	4	–	1	–	1
Cumberland (TN) +	4	–	1	–	1	6	–	1	–	1
Sewanee	5	–	1	–	0	7	–	1	–	0
Vanderbilt	5	–	1	–	1	6	–	1	–	1
Mississippi A&M	2	–	0	–	2	3	–	0	–	2
Georgia	3	–	2	–	0	3	–	4	–	0
Ole Miss	1	–	1	–	1	2	–	1	–	1
Texas	0	–	0	–	1	5	–	1	–	2
Kentucky State	0	–	0	–	0	6	–	1	–	0
Alabama	3	–	4	–	0	3	–	4	–	0
Auburn	2	–	3	–	0	4	–	3	–	0
Tennessee	2	–	4	–	0	4	–	5	–	0
Georgia Tech	1	–	4	–	0	3	–	5	–	0
Tulane	0	–	1	–	1	2	–	2	–	1
Mercer	0	–	1	–	0	0	–	1	–	0
Nashville	0	–	2	–	0	1	–	3	–	0
LSU	0	–	5	–	0	4	–	5	–	0
SW Presbyterian			–					–
+ – Conference co-champions

The 1903 Mississippi A&M Aggies football team represented Mississippi Agricultural & Mechanical College—now known as Mississippi State University—during the 1903 Southern Intercollegiate Athletic Association football season. Led by first-year head coach Daniel S. Martin, the Aggies compiled an overall record of 3–0–2 with a mark of 2–0–2 in conference play.

== Schedule ==
Date	Time	Opponent	Site	Result	Source
October 16		Alabama	Columbus Fairgrounds; Columbus, MS (rivalry)	W 11–0	
October 24		at Meridian Athletic Club*	Meridian, MS	W 43–0	
November 7		LSU	Starkville Fairgrounds; Starkville, MS	W 11–0	
November 14		at Ole Miss	University Park; Oxford, MS (rivalry)	T 6–6	
December 5	3:30 p.m.	at Tulane	Athletic Park; New Orleans, LA	T 0–0	
*Non-conference game; All times are in Central time
