= Red Smith (American football) =

American football player (1881–1931)

Cumberland Bulldogs
- Position: Center
- Class: 1905

Personal information
- Born: October 10, 1881; Tennessee, U.S.
- Died: April 2, 1931; Columbia, Tennessee, U.S.
- Listed height: 6 ft 0 in (1.83 m)
- Listed weight: 170 lb (77 kg)

Career information
- High school: Mooney School
- College: Cumberland (1903–1905)

Awards and highlights
- SIAA championship (1903); All-Southern (1903, 1905); Cumberland Sports Hall of Fame

Frank Dorsey "Red" Smith (October 10, 1881 – April 2, 1931) was an American college football player and farmer from near Columbia, Tennessee.

== Early life ==
He attended preparatory school at Mooney School in Franklin, Tennessee along with Ed Hamilton and Frank Kyle.

== Cumberland ==
Smith was a prominent center for the Cumberland Bulldogs of Cumberland University in Lebanon, Tennessee, inducted into the Cumberland Sports Hall of Fame in 1978. Cumberland coach A. L. Phillips said Smith was the "only man he ever saw who has reduced football to a science." In 1915, John Heisman selected the 30 greatest Southern football players, and mentioned Smith seventh.

=== 1903 ===
At Cumberland he was a member of Pi Kappa Alpha, praised for his athleticism along with M. O. Bridges. Smith, M. O. Bridges, and M. L. Bridges helped lead Cumberland to a share of the 1903 Southern Intercollegiate Athletic Association (SIAA) title. Smith was selected All-Southern.

That year, Cumberland defeated Vanderbilt and tied coach John Heisman's Clemson Tigers football team at the end of the year in the game billed as the "SIAA championship game" in Montgomery, Alabama on Thanksgiving Day. Cumberland rushed out to an early 11 to 0 lead. Wiley Lee Umphlett in Creating the Big Game: John W. Heisman and the Invention of American Football writes, "During the first half, Clemson was never really in the game due mainly to formidable line play of the Bridges brothers–giants in their day at 6 feet 4 inches–and a big center named "Red" Smith, was all over the field backing up the Cumberland line on defense. Clemson had been outweighed before, but certainly not like this."

=== 1904 ===
He was captain of its 1904 team. Smith was called the South's greatest center.

=== 1905 ===
Smith was again selected All-Southern in 1905.
