= 1903 Clemson Tigers football team =

American college football season

1903 Clemson Tigers football
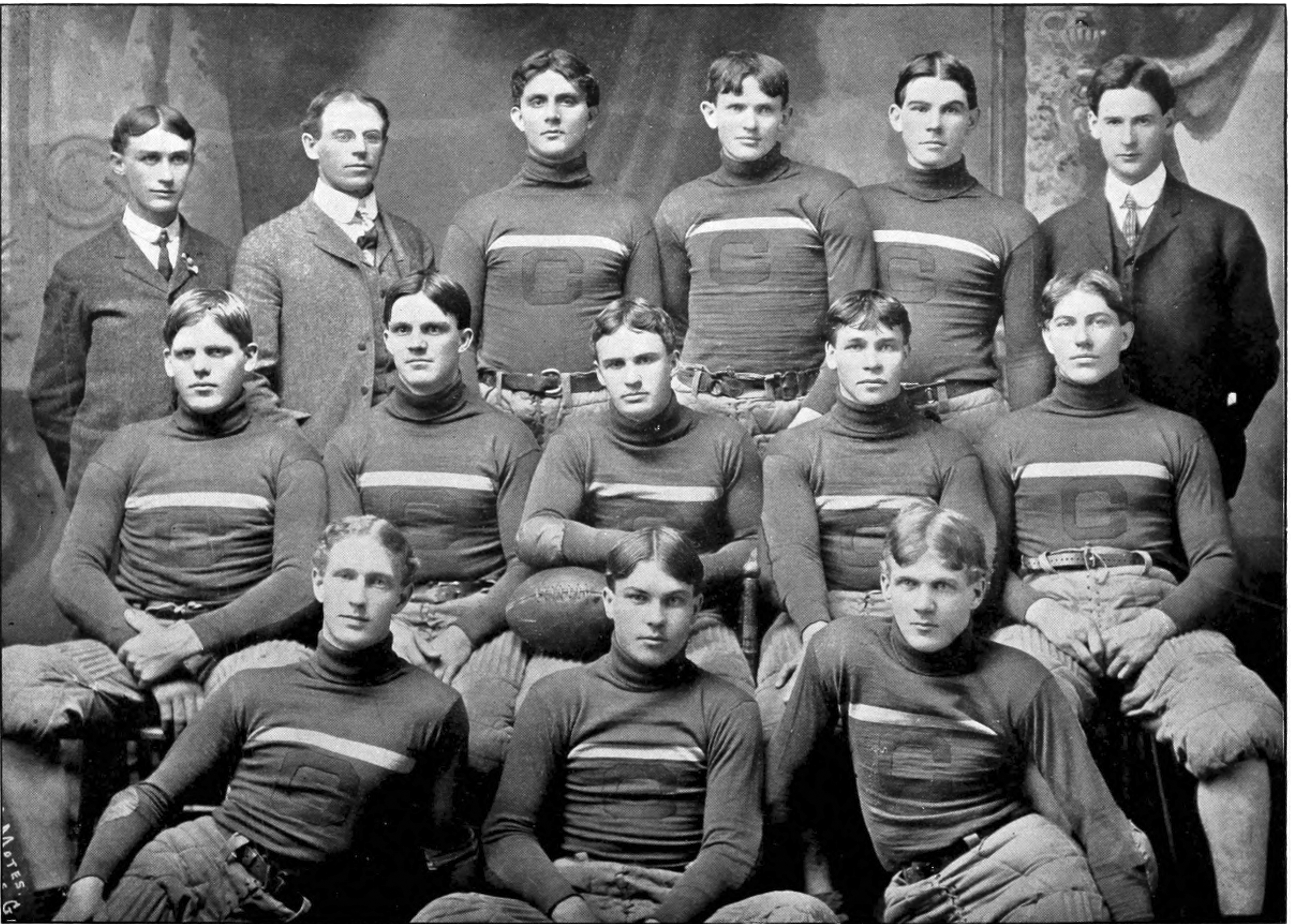

SIAA co-champion
- Conference: Southern Intercollegiate Athletic Association
- Record: 4–1–1 (2–0–1 SIAA)
- Head coach: John Heisman (4th season)
- Captain: Hope Sadler
- Home stadium: Bowman Field

1903 Southern Intercollegiate Athletic Association football standings
	Conf.					Overall
Team	W		L		T	W		L		T
Clemson +	2	–	0	–	1	4	–	1	–	1
Cumberland (TN) +	4	–	1	–	1	6	–	1	–	1
Sewanee	5	–	1	–	0	7	–	1	–	0
Vanderbilt	5	–	1	–	1	6	–	1	–	1
Mississippi A&M	2	–	0	–	2	3	–	0	–	2
Georgia	3	–	2	–	0	3	–	4	–	0
Ole Miss	1	–	1	–	1	2	–	1	–	1
Texas	0	–	0	–	1	5	–	1	–	2
Kentucky State	0	–	0	–	0	6	–	1	–	0
Alabama	3	–	4	–	0	3	–	4	–	0
Auburn	2	–	3	–	0	4	–	3	–	0
Tennessee	2	–	4	–	0	4	–	5	–	0
Georgia Tech	1	–	4	–	0	3	–	5	–	0
Tulane	0	–	1	–	1	2	–	2	–	1
Mercer	0	–	1	–	0	0	–	1	–	0
Nashville	0	–	2	–	0	1	–	3	–	0
LSU	0	–	5	–	0	4	–	5	–	0
SW Presbyterian			–					–
+ – Conference co-champions

The 1903 Clemson Tigers football team represented Clemson Agricultural College—now known as Clemson University—as a member of the Southern Intercollegiate Athletic Association (SIAA) during the 1903 college football season. Led by John Heisman in his fourth and final season as head coach, the Tigers compiled an overall record of 4–1–1 with mark of 2–0–1 in SIAA play.

The team competed in an early conference championship game, tying the Cumberland Bulldogs, 11–11; in the contest. The Tigers thrashed Georgia Tech, 73–0, leading to Heisman's job offer at Tech. Clemson played all its games on the road.

== Before the season ==
For the 1903 season, point values were different from those used in contemporary games. In 1903 a touchdown was worth five points, a field goal was worth five points and a conversion (PAT) was worth one point.

The team's captain was Hope Sadler. This was the last season with both Sadler and Carl Sitton at ends. One writer recalls, "Sitton and Hope Sadler were the finest ends that Clemson ever had perhaps."

== Schedule ==
Date	Time	Opponent	Site	Result	Source
October 10		at Georgia	Herty Field; Athens, GA (rivalry)	W 29–0	
October 17	3:30 p. m.	at Georgia Tech	Piedmont Park; Atlanta, GA (rivalry)	W 73–0	
October 28		vs. North Carolina A&M*	Columbia, SC (rivalry)	W 24–0	
November 14		at North Carolina*	Campus Athletic Field; Chapel Hill, NC	L 6–11	
November 21		at Davidson*	Latta Park; Charlotte, NC	W 24–0	
November 26		vs. Cumberland (TN)	Oak Park; Montgomery, AL (SIAA Championship)	T 11–11	
*Non-conference game

== Game summaries ==
=== Week 1: at Georgia ===
The season opened with a defeat of the Georgia Bulldogs 29–0. Clemson fumbled on a number of plays.

The starting lineup was Sitton (left end), Forsythe (left tackle), McKeown (left guard), Garrison (center), Derrick (right guard), Cogburn (right tackle), Sadler (right end), Maxwell (quarterback), Furtick (left halfback), Wood (right halfback), Hanvey (fullback).

=== Week 2: at Georgia Tech ===
Clemson at Georgia Tech

Team	1	2	Total
• Clemson	51	22	73
Ga. Tech	0	0	0

- Date: October 17
- Location: Atlanta
- Game start: 3:30 p. m.
- Referee: W. R. Tichenor

The Bulldogs offered Clemson a bushel of apples for every point over 29 it scored against rival Georgia Tech. Clemson won 73 to 0 on a mud-soaked field, leading to Heisman's later job at Tech. Sitton had to sit out the game.

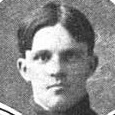
Jock Hanvey

Clemson as a team rushed for 615 yards, and fullback Jock Hanvey rushed for 104 yards in the first half. The first score came on a 20-yard run by Hanvey.

The starting lineup was Ellison (left end), Cogburn (left tackle), Derrick (left guard), Garrison (center), Forsythe (right guard), McKeown (right tackle), Sadler (right end), Maxwell (quarterback), Furtick (left halfback), Wood (right halfback), Hanvey (fullback).

=== Week 3: North Carolina A&M ===
In the third week of play, North Carolina A&M was beaten by Clemson 24 to 0. While A&M gained much using conventional football, Clemson had to use many trick plays. Oliver Gardner played for A&M. Heisman got married soon after the game.

=== Week 4: at North Carolina ===
Clemson at North Carolina

Team	1	2	Total
Clemson	6	0	6
• UNC	11	0	11

- Date: November 14
- Location: Chapel Hill, North Carolina

The North Carolina Tar Heels handed Clemson its only loss of the season, 11–6. Carolina's Newton scored first, with a bloody nose. He also scored the second touchdown. Clemson had one touchdown by Johnny Maxwell called back due to an offside penalty.

The starting lineup was Sitton (left end), Cogburn (left tackle), Derrick (left guard), Garrison (center), Forsythe (right guard), McKeown (right tackle), Sadler (right end), Maxwell (quarterback), Wood (left halfback), Furtick (right halfback), Hanvey (fullback).

=== Week 5: at Davidson ===
Clemson at Davidson

Team	1	2	Total
• Clemson	18	6	24
Davidson	0	0	0

- Date: November 21
- Location: Latta Park
  Charlotte, North Carolina

Clemson won easily over Davidson, 24–0. One writer noted "Clemson playing against eleven wooden men, would attract attention." Carl Sitton had a 60-yard touchdown run.

The starting lineup was Sitton (left end), Cogburn (left tackle), Derrick (left guard), Garrison (center), Forsythe (right guard), McKeown (right tackle), Sadler (right end), Maxwell (quarterback), Wood (left halfback), Furtick (right halfback), Hanvey (fullback).

== Postseason ==
=== "SIAA championship game" ===
Clemson vs. Cumberland

Team	1	2	Total
Clemson	0	11	11
Cumberland	11	0	11

- Date: November 26
- Location: Montgomery, Alabama
- Referee: W. R. Tichenor

Clemson tied Cumberland 11–11 in a game billed as the "SIAA Championship Game." Cumberland rushed out to an early 11–0 lead. Wiley Lee Umphlett in Creating the Big Game: John W. Heisman and the Invention of American Football writes, "During the first half, Clemson was never really in the game due mainly to formidable line play of the Bridges brothers–giants in their day at 6 feet 4 inches–and a big center named "Red" Smith, was all over the field backing up the Cumberland line on defense. Clemson had been outweighed before, but certainly not like this."

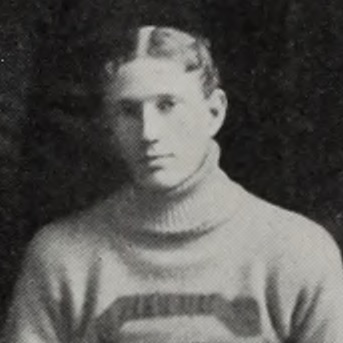
Quarterback John Maxwell returned a kickoff for a touchdown.

A contemporary account reads "The Clemson players seemed mere dwarfs as they lined up for the kickoff. To the crowd on the sidelines it didn't seem that Heisman's charges could possibly do more than give a gallant account of themselves in a losing battle." A touchdown was scored by fullback E. L. Minton (touchdowns were worth 5 points). Guard M. O. Bridges kicked the extra point. Halfback J. A. Head made another touchdown, but Bridges missed the try. After halftime, Clemson quarterback John Maxwell raced 100 yards for a touchdown. Clemson missed the try. Cumberland fumbled a punt and Clemson recovered. Cumberland expected a trick play when Fritz Furtick simply ran up the middle and scored. One account of the play reads "Heisman saw his chance to exploit a weakness in the Cumberland defense: run the ball where the ubiquitous Red Smith wasn't. So the next time Sitton started out on one of his slashing end runs, at the last second he tossed he ball back to the fullback who charges straight over center (where Smith would have been except that he was zeroing in on the elusive Sitton) and went all the way for he tying touchdown." Jock Hanvey kicked the extra point and the game ended in an 11–11 tie.

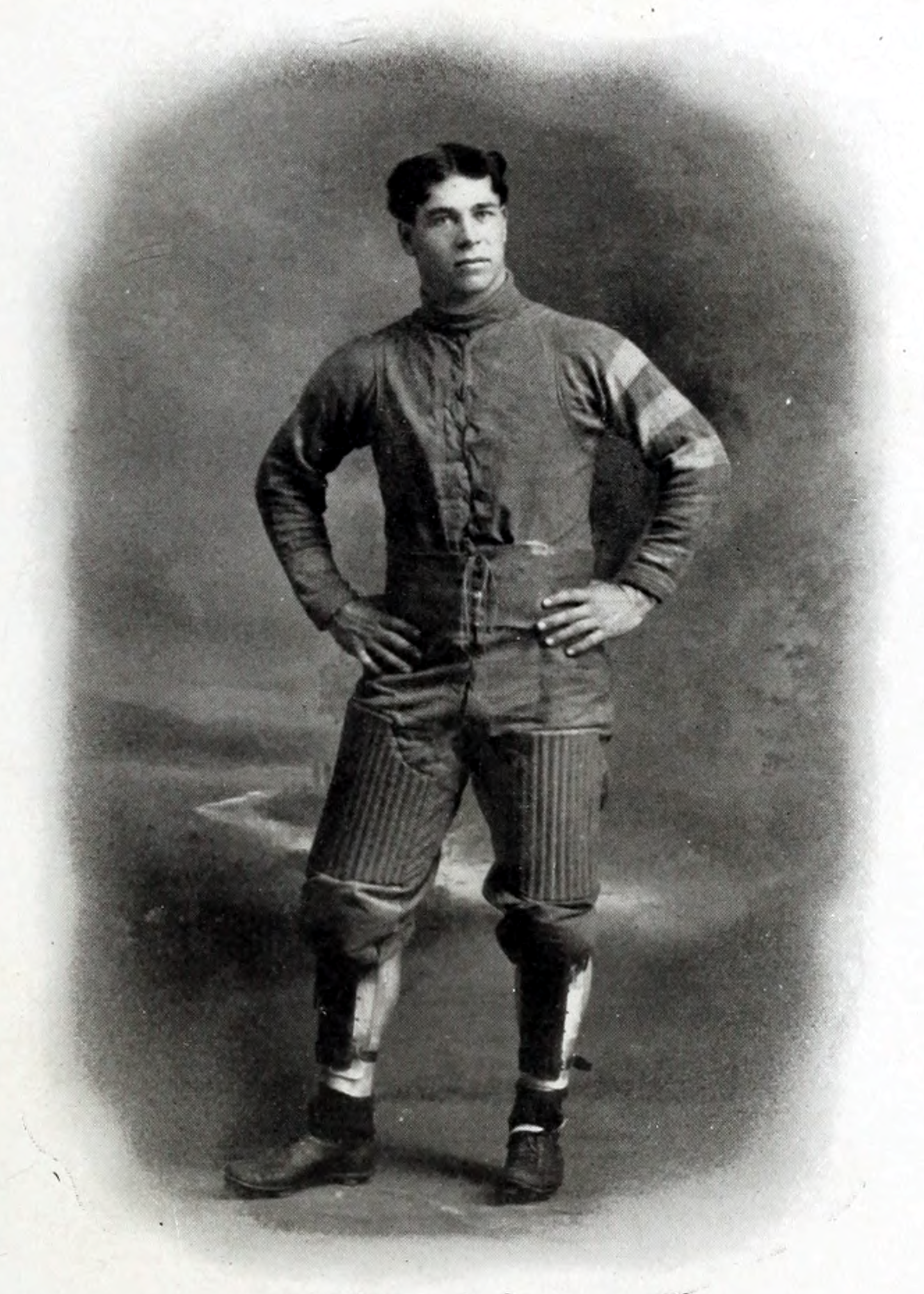
Fritz Furtick

The winning team was to be awarded the ball. Captain W. W. Suddarth of Cumberland wanted captain Hope Sadler of Clemson to get the ball, and Sadler insisted Suddarth should have it. Some ten minutes of bickering was resolved when the ball was given to patrolman Patrick J. Sweeney, for warning the media and fans to stay down in front and allow spectators to see the game. The school claims a share of the title; Heisman pushed for Cumberland to be named SIAA champions at year's end. It was Heisman's last game as Clemson head coach, who was hired at Georgia Tech.

The starting lineup was Sitton (left end), Cogburn (left tackle), Derrick (left guard), Garrison (center), Forsythe (right guard), McKeown (right tackle), Sadler (right end), Maxwell (quarterback), Wood (left halfback), Furtick (right halfback), Hanvey (fullback).

=== Florida coaches ===
Marvin Bridges and Clemson players Jock Hanvey and Jack Forsythe all coached at Florida colleges the next season. Bridges coached at the University of Florida at Lake City, and Forsythe was the head coach of the Florida State College with Hanvey as his assistant. Forsythe went on in 1906 to be the first coach of the Florida Gators.

== Personnel ==
=== Depth chart ===
The following chart provides a visual depiction of Clemson's lineup during the 1903 season with games started at the position reflected in parentheses. The chart mimics the offense in a T formation

LE
Carl Sitton (4)
Gil Ellison (1)

LT	LG	C	RG	RT
H. L. Cogburn (4)	Puss Derrick (1)	Bill Garrison (5)	Pee Wee Forsythe (4)	Max McKeown (4)
Pee Wee Forsythe (1)	J. A. McKeown (1)		Puss Derrick (1)	H. L. Cogburn (1)

RE
Hope Sadler (5)

QB
John Maxwell (5)

LHB	FB	RHB
L. S. Wood (3)	Jock Hanvey (5)	Fritz Furtick (3)
Fritz Furtick (2)		L. S. Wood (2)

-

=== Line ===
Player	Position	Games started	Hometown	Prep school	Height	Weight	Age
H. L. Cogburn	tackle	5					
Puss Derrick	guard	2	Chapin, South Carolina			195	
Gil Ellison	end	1					
Jack Forsythe	tackle	5	Brevard, North Carolina				
Bill Garrison	center	5					
Max McKeown	guard	5					
Hope Sadler	end	5	York Co., South Carolina			154	
Carl Sitton	end	4	Pendleton, South Carolina		5'10"	170	

=== Backfield ===
Player	Position	Games started	Hometown	Prep school	Height	Weight	Age
Fritz Furtick	halfback	5	Sandy Run, South Carolina			170	
Jock Hanvey	fullback	5	Abbeville Co., South Carolina				
John Maxwell	quarterback	5	Anderson, South Carolina		5'9"	149	
L. S. Wood	halfback	5					

== Books ==
- Blackman, Sam (2001). Clemson: Where the Tigers Play. ISBN 9781582613697.
- Blackman, Sam (2016). If These Walls Could Talk. Triumph Books. ISBN 9781633196896 – via Google Books.
- Heisman, John M. (2012). Heisman: The Man Behind the Trophy. Simon and Schuster. ISBN 9781451682915.
- Langum, David J (2010). From Maverick to Mainstream: Cumberland School of Law, 1847-1997. ISBN 9780820336183.
- Sahadi, Lou (2014). 100 Things Clemson Fans Should Know & Do Before They Die. ISBN 9781623689490.
- Umphlett, Wiley Lee (1992). Creating the Big Game: John W. Heisman and the Invention of American Football. Greenwood Publishing Group. ISBN 9780313284045.
- Woodruff, Fuzzy (1928). A History of Southern Football 1890–1928. Vol. 1.
