= Jock Hanvey =

American football player and coach (1882–1935)

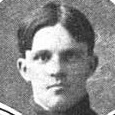
- Hanvey, c. 1903

Profile
- Position: Fullback

Personal information
- Born: October 15, 1882; Abbeville County, South Carolina, U.S.
- Died: January 15, 1935 (aged 52); Portsmouth, Virginia, U.S.

Career information
- College: Clemson (1902–1903)

Awards and highlights
- SIAA championship (1902, 1903); All-Southern (1902, 1903)

Connor "Jock" Hanvey (October 15, 1882 – January 15, 1935) was an American college football player and coach.

== Early life ==
Many of Hanvey's brothers played for Clemson. George A. Hanvey, Jr. was a lieutenant colonel in the Army.

== Clemson ==
=== Football ===
He was a prominent fullback for the Clemson Tigers of Clemson University in 1902 and 1903, winning 2 SIAA titles with John Heisman as coach and selected All-Southern in both years.

==== 1902 ====
He scored 3 touchdowns on Georgia in 1902, and started every game that year.

==== 1903 ====
Clemson beat the Georgia Bulldogs 29 to 0; Frank M. Ridley assisted the Bulldogs and praised Hanvey's work against his team, stating he was the most remarkable player in the south with the possible exception of Frank Kyle. Georgia offered Clemson a bushel of apples for every point over 29 it scored against rival Georgia Tech. Clemson would win 73 to 0, leading to Heisman's job at Tech the next year. Hanvey rushed for 104 yards in the first half. The account in the Atlanta Constitution read "Hanvey, the Clemson full back, outclassed them all. Time and time again he was sent through the line for gains of 10, 15 and 20 yards, and his tackles were spectacular." In Heisman's last game at Clemson, Hanvey kicked the tying extra point in the 11 to 11 tie game at the end of the year with Cumberland billed as the championship of the south. Hanvey at one point during the season injured his shoulder.

== After Clemson ==
Hanvey also was involved with football at Florida State College and Virginia Polytechnic Institute. He assisted Jack Forsythe at the former.
