= 1903 Ole Miss Rebels football team =

American college football season

1903 Ole Miss Rebels football
- Conference: Southern Intercollegiate Athletic Association
- Record: 2–1–1 (1–1–1 SIAA)
- Head coach: M. S. Harvey (1st season)

1903 Southern Intercollegiate Athletic Association football standings
	Conf.					Overall
Team	W		L		T	W		L		T
Clemson +	2	–	0	–	1	4	–	1	–	1
Cumberland (TN) +	4	–	1	–	1	6	–	1	–	1
Sewanee	5	–	1	–	0	7	–	1	–	0
Vanderbilt	5	–	1	–	1	6	–	1	–	1
Mississippi A&M	2	–	0	–	2	3	–	0	–	2
Georgia	3	–	2	–	0	3	–	4	–	0
Ole Miss	1	–	1	–	1	2	–	1	–	1
Texas	0	–	0	–	1	5	–	1	–	2
Kentucky State	0	–	0	–	0	6	–	1	–	0
Alabama	3	–	4	–	0	3	–	4	–	0
Auburn	2	–	3	–	0	4	–	3	–	0
Tennessee	2	–	4	–	0	4	–	5	–	0
Georgia Tech	1	–	4	–	0	3	–	5	–	0
Tulane	0	–	1	–	1	2	–	2	–	1
Mercer	0	–	1	–	0	0	–	1	–	0
Nashville	0	–	2	–	0	1	–	3	–	0
LSU	0	–	5	–	0	4	–	5	–	0
SW Presbyterian			–					–
+ – Conference co-champions

The 1903 Ole Miss Rebels football team represented the University of Mississippi during the 1903 Southern Intercollegiate Athletic Association football season. The season's only loss was to Vanderbilt.

== Schedule ==
Date	Opponent	Site	Result	Source
October 24	at Vanderbilt	Dudley Field; Nashville, TN (rivalry)	L 0–33	
November 7	at Tennessee Docs*	Red Elm Park; Memphis, TN	W 17–0	
November 14	Mississippi A&M	University Park; Oxford, MS (rivalry)	T 6–6	
November 21	at LSU	Athletic Park; New Orleans, LA (rivalry)	W 11–0	
*Non-conference game
