= Tim Mathis =

American football coach

Current position
- Title: Head coach
- Team: Cumberland (TN)
- Conference: MSC
- Record: 37–42

Biographical details
- Education: Georgia Southern University (1996); Shorter University (2010)

Coaching career (HC unless noted)
- 1992–1994: Georgia Southern (SA)
- 1995–1996: Rome HS (GA) (assistant)
- 1997–2000: Trion HS (GA) (assistant)
- 2005–2009: Shorter (OL)
- 2010–2011: Shorter (AHC/OC/QB)
- 2012–2014: Shorter (AHC/OC/FB)
- 2015: Franklin County HS (FL)
- 2016–2017: St. Francis HS (GA)
- 2018–present: Cumberland (TN)

Head coaching record
- Overall: 37–42 (college); 9–21 (high school)

Tim Mathis is an American college football coach. He is the head football coach for Cumberland University, a position he has held since 2018.

Mathis was hired as the head football coach for Cumberland after Donnie Suber was hired as the defensive coordinator for Tennessee Tech. Prior to Mathis' hiring, he served as the head coach for St. Francis High School for two years.

== Head coaching record ==
=== College ===
Year	Team	Overall	Conference	Standing	Bowl/playoffs
Cumberland Phoenix (Mid-South Conference) (2018–present)
2018	Cumberland	5–6	3–3	T–4th (Bluegrass)	
2019	Cumberland	5–5	3–4	5th (Bluegrass)	
2020–21	Cumberland	2–5	2–4	T–6th (Bluegrass)	
2021	Cumberland	3–7	2–5	T–6th (Bluegrass)	
2022	Cumberland	3–7	1–7	8th	
2023	Cumberland	5–5	2–4	T–4th	
2024	Cumberland	7–3	3–3	T–3rd	
2025	Cumberland	7–4	3–3	T–4th	
2026	Cumberland	0–0	0–0		
Cumberland:		37–42	19–33		
Total:		37–42			
