= 1903 Tennessee Volunteers football team =

American college football season

1903 Tennessee Volunteers football
- Conference: Southern Intercollegiate Athletic Association
- Record: 4–5 (2–4 SIAA)
- Head coach: Hubert Fisher (2nd season)
- Captain: T. B. Green
- Home stadium: Baldwin Park

1903 Southern Intercollegiate Athletic Association football standings
	Conf.					Overall
Team	W		L		T	W		L		T
Clemson +	2	–	0	–	1	4	–	1	–	1
Cumberland (TN) +	4	–	1	–	1	6	–	1	–	1
Sewanee	5	–	1	–	0	7	–	1	–	0
Vanderbilt	5	–	1	–	1	6	–	1	–	1
Mississippi A&M	2	–	0	–	2	3	–	0	–	2
Georgia	3	–	2	–	0	3	–	4	–	0
Ole Miss	1	–	1	–	1	2	–	1	–	1
Texas	0	–	0	–	1	5	–	1	–	2
Kentucky State	0	–	0	–	0	6	–	1	–	0
Alabama	3	–	4	–	0	3	–	4	–	0
Auburn	2	–	3	–	0	4	–	3	–	0
Tennessee	2	–	4	–	0	4	–	5	–	0
Georgia Tech	1	–	4	–	0	3	–	5	–	0
Tulane	0	–	1	–	1	2	–	2	–	1
Mercer	0	–	1	–	0	0	–	1	–	0
Nashville	0	–	2	–	0	1	–	3	–	0
LSU	0	–	5	–	0	4	–	5	–	0
SW Presbyterian			–					–
+ – Conference co-champions

The 1903 Tennessee Volunteers football team represented the University of Tennessee in the 1903 Southern Intercollegiate Athletic Association football season. The team was coached by Hubert Fisher in his second and final season at Tennessee. The Volunteers went 4–5 overall with a record of 2–4 in the Southern Intercollegiate Athletic Association (SIAA).

== Schedule ==
Date	Opponent	Site	Result	Source
October 3	Maryville (TN)*	Baldwin Park; Knoxville, TN	W 17–0	
October 10	Carson–Newman*	Baldwin Park; Knoxville, TN	W 38–0	
October 17	at Vanderbilt	Dudley Field; Nashville, TN (rivalry)	L 0–40	
October 29	at South Carolina*	Old State Fairgrounds; Columbia, SC (rivalry)	L 0–24	
October 31	at Nashville	Peabody Field; Nashville, TN	W 10–0	
November 7	Georgia	Baldwin Park; Knoxville, TN (rivalry)	L 0–5	
November 14	Sewanee	Baldwin Park; Knoxville, TN	L 0–17	
November 21	Georgia Tech	Baldwin Park; Knoxville, TN (rivalry)	W 11–0	
November 26	at Alabama	West End Park; Birmingham, AL (rivalry)	L 0–24	
*Non-conference game
