= 1903 Nashville Garnet and Blue football team =

American college football season

1903 Nashville Garnet and Blue football
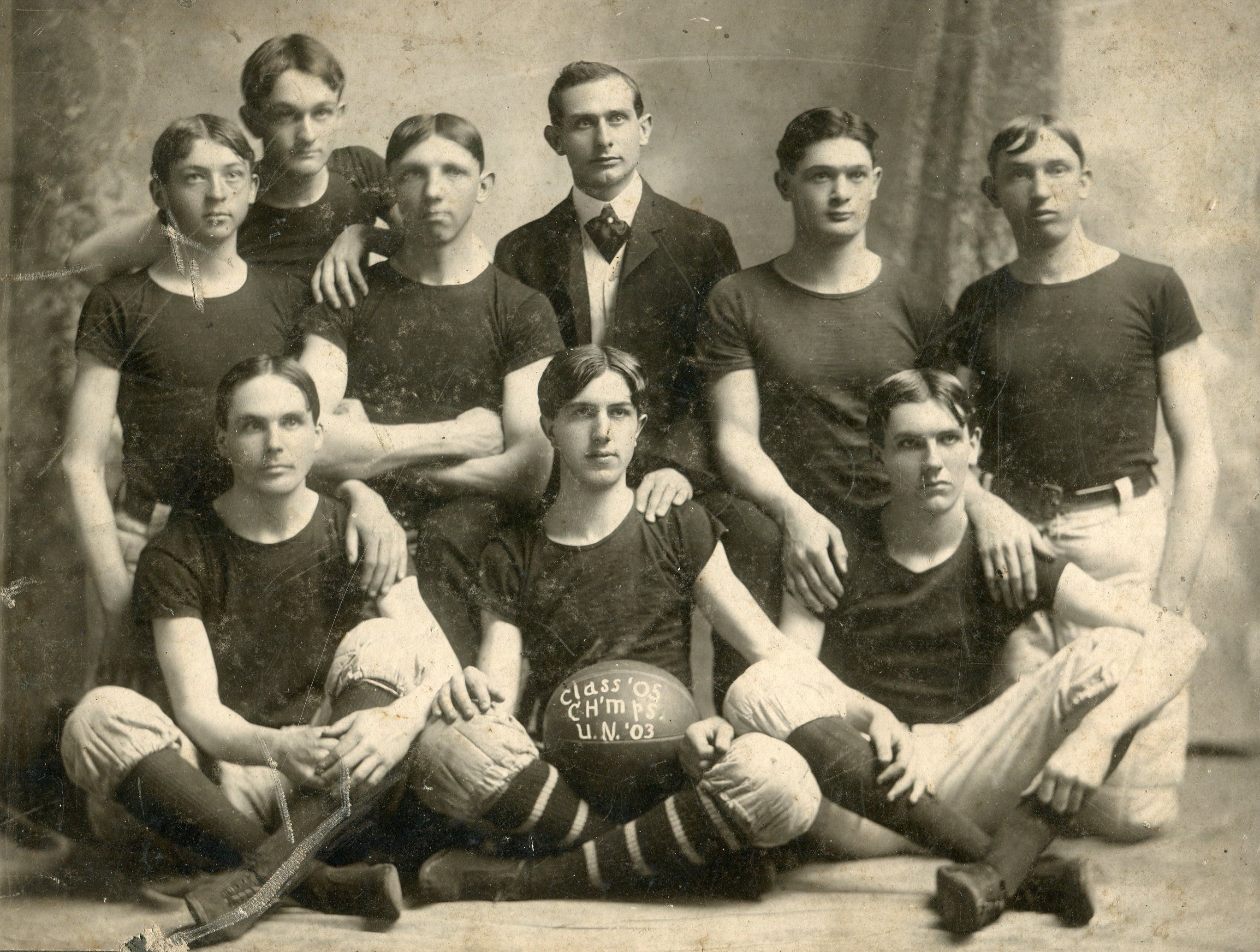
- Conference: Southern Intercollegiate Athletic Association
- Record: 1–3 (0–2 SIAA)
- Head coach: E. A. Wreidt (2 games); Bradley Walker (1 game); Avent Childress (1 game)
- Home stadium: Peabody Field

1903 Southern Intercollegiate Athletic Association football standings
| | Conf. | | | | | Overall |
| Team | W | | L | | T | W | | L | | T |
|---|---|---|---|---|---|---|---|---|---|---|
| Clemson + | 2 | – | 0 | – | 1 | 4 | – | 1 | – | 1 |
| Cumberland (TN) + | 4 | – | 1 | – | 1 | 6 | – | 1 | – | 1 |
| Sewanee | 5 | – | 1 | – | 0 | 7 | – | 1 | – | 0 |
| Vanderbilt | 5 | – | 1 | – | 1 | 6 | – | 1 | – | 1 |
| Mississippi A&M | 2 | – | 0 | – | 2 | 3 | – | 0 | – | 2 |
| Georgia | 3 | – | 2 | – | 0 | 3 | – | 4 | – | 0 |
| Ole Miss | 1 | – | 1 | – | 1 | 2 | – | 1 | – | 1 |
| Texas | 0 | – | 0 | – | 1 | 5 | – | 1 | – | 2 |
| Kentucky State | 0 | – | 0 | – | 0 | 6 | – | 1 | – | 0 |
| Alabama | 3 | – | 4 | – | 0 | 3 | – | 4 | – | 0 |
| Auburn | 2 | – | 3 | – | 0 | 4 | – | 3 | – | 0 |
| Tennessee | 2 | – | 4 | – | 0 | 4 | – | 5 | – | 0 |
| Georgia Tech | 1 | – | 4 | – | 0 | 3 | – | 5 | – | 0 |
| Tulane | 0 | – | 1 | – | 1 | 2 | – | 2 | – | 1 |
| Mercer | 0 | – | 1 | – | 0 | 0 | – | 1 | – | 0 |
| Nashville | 0 | – | 2 | – | 0 | 1 | – | 3 | – | 0 |
| LSU | 0 | – | 5 | – | 0 | 4 | – | 5 | – | 0 |
| SW Presbyterian | | | – | | | | | – |
+ – Conference co-champions

The 1903 Nashville Garnet and Blue football team represented the University of Nashville during the 1903 Southern Intercollegiate Athletic Association football season. The team was disbanded, and then started back again.

== Schedule ==
| Date | Opponent | Site | Result | Source |
|---|---|---|---|---|
| October 17 | at Mooney School* | Mooney Field; Murfreesboro, TN | L 5–17 | |
| October 31 | Tennessee | Peabody Field; Nashville, TN | L 0–10 | |
| November 7 | Sewanee | Peabody Field; Nashville, TN | L 0–6 | |
| November 13 | Tennessee Docs* | Peabody Field; Nashville, TN | W 26–0 | |
*Non-conference game
