= 1903 Alabama Crimson White football team =

American college football season

1903 Alabama Crimson White football
- Conference: Southern Intercollegiate Athletic Association
- Record: 3–4 (3–4 SIAA)
- Head coach: W. A. Blount (1st season)
- Captain: W. S. Wyatt
- Home stadium: The Quad; West End Park

1903 Southern Intercollegiate Athletic Association football standings
	Conf.					Overall
Team	W		L		T	W		L		T
Clemson +	2	–	0	–	1	4	–	1	–	1
Cumberland (TN) +	4	–	1	–	1	6	–	1	–	1
Sewanee	5	–	1	–	0	7	–	1	–	0
Vanderbilt	5	–	1	–	1	6	–	1	–	1
Mississippi A&M	2	–	0	–	2	3	–	0	–	2
Georgia	3	–	2	–	0	3	–	4	–	0
Ole Miss	1	–	1	–	1	2	–	1	–	1
Texas	0	–	0	–	1	5	–	1	–	2
Kentucky State	0	–	0	–	0	6	–	1	–	0
Alabama	3	–	4	–	0	3	–	4	–	0
Auburn	2	–	3	–	0	4	–	3	–	0
Tennessee	2	–	4	–	0	4	–	5	–	0
Georgia Tech	1	–	4	–	0	3	–	5	–	0
Tulane	0	–	1	–	1	2	–	2	–	1
Mercer	0	–	1	–	0	0	–	1	–	0
Nashville	0	–	2	–	0	1	–	3	–	0
LSU	0	–	5	–	0	4	–	5	–	0
SW Presbyterian			–					–
+ – Conference co-champions

The 1903 Alabama Crimson White football team (Note: Alabama football teams were not referred to as the "Crimson Tide" until the 1907 season. Prior to 1907, the team was called the "Crimson White" from 1893 to 1906 and the "Cadets" in 1892.) (variously "Alabama", "UA" or "Bama") represented the University of Alabama in the 1903 college football season. The team was led by head coach W. A. Blount, in his first season, and played their home games at The Quad in Tuscaloosa and at West End Park in Birmingham, Alabama. In what was the eleventh season of Alabama football, the team finished with a record of three wins and four losses (3–4, 3–4 SIAA). Alabama did not have another losing season until their 1951 season.

Alabama opened the season with a pair of shutout losses on the road. After their loss at Vanderbilt, they were defeated by Mississippi A&M at Columbus in what was their first all-time win against Alabama. They then won their first game against Auburn at Montgomery. Alabama then played back-to-back Monday games and lost to Sewanee at Birmingham and defeated LSU in the first Tuscaloosa game of the season. They then closed the season with a loss to eventual SIAA co-champion Cumberland and their first all-time victory over Tennessee in their final game on Thanksgiving.

== Schedule ==
Date	Opponent	Site	Result	Attendance	Source
October 10	at Vanderbilt	Dudley Field; Nashville, TN	L 0–30	1,000	
October 16	at Mississippi A&M	Columbus Fairgrounds; Columbus, MS (rivalry)	L 0–11	5,000	
October 23	vs. Auburn	Riverside Park; Montgomery, AL (rivalry)	W 18–6	1,200	
November 2	Sewanee	West End Park; Birmingham, AL	L 0–23	2,400	
November 9	LSU	The Quad; Tuscaloosa, AL (rivalry)	W 18–0		
November 14	Cumberland (TN)	The Quad; Tuscaloosa, AL	L 0–44		
November 26	Tennessee	West End Park; Birmingham, AL (rivalry)	W 24–0		

- Scoring note: (Note: For the 1903 season, point values were different from those used in contemporary games. In 1903 a touchdown was worth five points, a field goal was worth five points and a conversion (PAT) was worth one point.)

== Game summaries ==
=== Vanderbilt ===
Team	1	2	Total
Alabama	0	0	0
• Vanderbilt	18	12	30

- Date: October 10
- Location: Dudley Field
  Nashville, Tennessee
- Game attendance: 1,000
- Referee: Crawford

Alabama opened the 1903 season with a 30–0 loss against Vanderbilt in the first all-time meeting between the schools at Dudley Field. Vanderbilt took an 18–0 halftime lead after first half touchdowns were scored twice by Ed Hamilton and followed by John J. Tigert. The Commodores then closed the game with two touchdowns in the second half scored by Dan Blake and Bob Blake for the 30–0 victory. Tigert converted all five PAT's in their victory. Frank Kyle starred for the Commodores in the contest with runs of 30, 35, 48 and 50-yards against the Crimson White.

The starting lineup was: R. L. Lodge (left end), Aubrey Boyles (left tackle), W. C. Oates (left guard), James C. Gwin (center), J. C. Fortune (right guard), John Roberts Peavy (right tackle), W. S. Sherrill (right end), W. S. Wyatt (quarterback), Auxford Burks (left halfback), Truman Smith (right halfback), Frank B. Clark (fullback).

=== Mississippi A&M ===
Team	1	2	Total
Alabama	0	0	0
• Mississippi A&M	0	11	11

- Date: October 16
- Location: Columbus Fairgrounds
  Columbus, Mississippi
- Game attendance: 5,000

A week after their loss to Vanderbilt, Alabama was defeated the Aggies of Mississippi A&M (now known as Mississippi State University) 11–0 at the Columbus Fairgrounds in Columbus, Mississippi. The game was played before 5,000 fans in a light drizzle with the Aggies scoring all of their points in the second half after a scoreless first.

=== Auburn ===
Team	1	2	Total
• Alabama	6	12	18
Auburn	0	6	6

- Date: October 23
- Location: Riverside Park
  Montgomery, Alabama
- Game attendance: 1,200

After being shut out for their first two games, Alabama upset the Alabama Polytechnic Institute (now known as Auburn University) 18–6 before 1,200 fans at Riverside Park in Montgomery. J. V. Boyles scored a touchdown for Alabama to cap a 19-play, 79-yard drive on their opening possession and with the extra point took a 6–0 lead.

In the second half, Alabama extended their lead to 12–0 after Truman Smith scored on a 45-yard touchdown run. After Auburn cut the lead to 12–6 with a W. G. Boyd touchdown run, Alabama scored the final points of the game on a 25-yard Smith run for the 18–6 victory.

The starting lineup was: R. L. Lodge (left end), Aubrey Boyles (left tackle), W. C. Oates (left guard), James C. Gwin (center), J. C. Fortune (right guard), John Roberts Peavy (right tackle), W. S. Sherrill (right end), W. S. Wyatt (quarterback), Auxford Burks (left halfback), Truman Smith (right halfback), Frank B. Clark (fullback).

=== Sewanee ===
Team	1	2	Total
• Sewanee	18	5	23
Alabama	0	0	0

- Date: November 2
- Location: West End Park
  Birmingham, Alabama
- Game attendance: 2,400

Playing Sewanee for the first time since the 1896 season, Alabama was shut out 23–0 at West End Park in Birmingham. John Schaffer starred for the Tigers with three separate runs of 40-yards in the victory. The game was originally scheduled to be played in Tuscaloosa, but was subsequently moved to Birmingham in an effort to increase gate receipts. The loss brought Alabama's all-time record against Sewanee to 1–3.

The starting lineup was: R. L. Lodge (left end), Aubrey Boyles (left tackle), W. C. Oates (left guard), James C. Gwin (center), Guy Redden (right guard), John C. McCorquodale (right tackle), W. S. Sherrill (right end), W. S. Wyatt (quarterback), Auxford Burks (left halfback), Truman Smith (right halfback), W. McMahon (fullback).

=== LSU ===
Team	1	2	Total
LSU	0	0	0
• Alabama	12	6	18

- Date: November 9
- Location: The Quad
  Tuscaloosa, Alabama

Alabama secured their first all-time victory over LSU with its 18–0 win at Tuscaloosa. Both John Roberts Peavy and W. S. Sherrill scored first half touchdowns, and Truman Smith scored on a fake punt returned 65-yards for the 18–0 victory. The starting lineup was: R. L. Lodge (left end), Aubrey Boyles (left tackle), W. C. Oates (left guard), James C. Gwin (center), Guy Redden (right guard), John Roberts Peavy (right tackle), W. S. Sherrill (right end), W. S. Wyatt (quarterback), Auxford Burks (left halfback), Truman Smith (right halfback), W. McMahon (fullback).

=== Cumberland (TN) ===
Against Cumberland of Lebanon, Tennessee, Alabama lost 44–0 on The Quad in Tuscaloosa.

The starting lineup was: W. S. Sherrill (left end), John Roberts Peavy (left tackle), W. C. Oates (left guard), James C. Gwin (center), Guy Redden (right guard), Aubrey Boyles (right tackle), R. L. Lodge (right end), W. S. Wyatt (quarterback), Auxford Burks (left halfback), Truman Smith (right halfback), W. McMahon (fullback).

=== Tennessee ===
Team	1	2	Total
Tennessee	0	0	0
• Alabama	24	0	24

- Date: November 26
- Location: West End Park
  Birmingham, Alabama

A week after their 44–0 loss to Cumberland, Alabama defeated Tennessee 24–0 at Birmingham. Alabama scored touchdowns on runs of three-yards by W. McMahon, one-yard by John Roberts Peavy, one-yard by Auxford Burks and two-yards by Truman Smith.

The starting lineup was: R. L. Lodge (left end), Aubrey Boyles (left tackle), Guy Redden (left guard), James C. Gwin (center), W. C. Oates (right guard), John Roberts Peavy (right tackle), W. S. Sherrill (right end), W. S. Wyatt (quarterback), Auxford Burks (left halfback), Truman Smith (right halfback), W. McMahon (fullback).

== Players ==
=== Line ===
Player	Position
Aubrey Boyles	tackle
J. C. Fortune	guard
J. C. Granade	tackle
James C. Gwin	center
R. L. Lodge	end
W. C. Oates	guard
John Roberts Peavy	tackle
Guy Redden	guard
W. S. Sherrill	end

=== Backfield ===
Player	Position
Auxford Burks	halfback
Frank B. Clark
Floy Hall
W. McMahon
Truman Smith
W. S. Wyatt
