= 1903 Kentucky State College Blue and White football team =

American college football season

1903 Kentucky State College Blue and White football
- Conference: Southern Intercollegiate Athletic Association
- Record: 6–1 (0–0 SIAA)
- Head coach: Jack Wright (1st season)
- Captain: David Maddox
- Home stadium: State College Park

1903 Southern Intercollegiate Athletic Association football standings
	Conf.					Overall
Team	W		L		T	W		L		T
Clemson +	2	–	0	–	1	4	–	1	–	1
Cumberland (TN) +	4	–	1	–	1	6	–	1	–	1
Sewanee	5	–	1	–	0	7	–	1	–	0
Vanderbilt	5	–	1	–	1	6	–	1	–	1
Mississippi A&M	2	–	0	–	2	3	–	0	–	2
Georgia	3	–	2	–	0	3	–	4	–	0
Ole Miss	1	–	1	–	1	2	–	1	–	1
Texas	0	–	0	–	1	5	–	1	–	2
Kentucky State	0	–	0	–	0	6	–	1	–	0
Alabama	3	–	4	–	0	3	–	4	–	0
Auburn	2	–	3	–	0	4	–	3	–	0
Tennessee	2	–	4	–	0	4	–	5	–	0
Georgia Tech	1	–	4	–	0	3	–	5	–	0
Tulane	0	–	1	–	1	2	–	2	–	1
Mercer	0	–	1	–	0	0	–	1	–	0
Nashville	0	–	2	–	0	1	–	3	–	0
LSU	0	–	5	–	0	4	–	5	–	0
SW Presbyterian			–					–
+ – Conference co-champions

The 1903 Kentucky State College Blue and White football team represented Kentucky State College—now known as the University of Kentucky—during the 1903 Southern Intercollegiate Athletic Association football season. Led by Jack Wright in his first and only season as head coach, the Blue and White compiled an overall record of 6–1.

== Schedule ==
Date	Time	Opponent	Site	Result	Attendance	Source
September 25		Cynthiana*	State College Park; Lexington, KY	W 39–0		
October 10		Berea*	State College Park; Lexington, KY	W 17–0		
October 17		Kentucky Military Institute*	State College Park; Lexington, KY	W 18–0		
October 29		Miami (OH)*	State College Park; Lexington, KY	W 47–0		
November 2		Georgetown (KY)*	State College Park; Lexington, KY	W 51–0		
November 7		Marietta*	State College Park; Lexington, KY	W 11–5		
November 26	2:00 p.m.	vs. Kentucky University*	South Side Park; Lexington, KY (rivalry)	L 0–17	3,000–5,000	
*Non-conference game
