= 1903 Sewanee Tigers football team =

American college football season

1903 Sewanee Tigers football
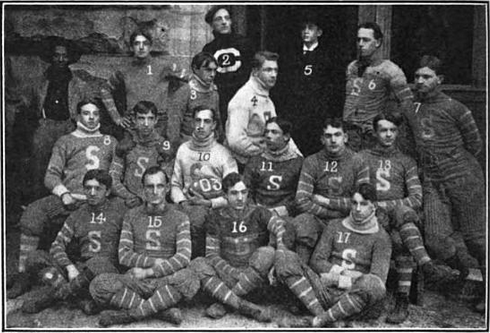
- Conference: Southern Intercollegiate Athletic Association
- Record: 7–1 (5–1 SIAA)
- Head coach: George S. Whitney (1st season)
- Captain: Joseph Lee Kirby-Smith
- Home stadium: Hardee Field

1903 Southern Intercollegiate Athletic Association football standings
	Conf.					Overall
Team	W		L		T	W		L		T
Clemson +	2	–	0	–	1	4	–	1	–	1
Cumberland (TN) +	4	–	1	–	1	6	–	1	–	1
Sewanee	5	–	1	–	0	7	–	1	–	0
Vanderbilt	5	–	1	–	1	6	–	1	–	1
Mississippi A&M	2	–	0	–	2	3	–	0	–	2
Georgia	3	–	2	–	0	3	–	4	–	0
Ole Miss	1	–	1	–	1	2	–	1	–	1
Texas	0	–	0	–	1	5	–	1	–	2
Kentucky State	0	–	0	–	0	6	–	1	–	0
Alabama	3	–	4	–	0	3	–	4	–	0
Auburn	2	–	3	–	0	4	–	3	–	0
Tennessee	2	–	4	–	0	4	–	5	–	0
Georgia Tech	1	–	4	–	0	3	–	5	–	0
Tulane	0	–	1	–	1	2	–	2	–	1
Mercer	0	–	1	–	0	0	–	1	–	0
Nashville	0	–	2	–	0	1	–	3	–	0
LSU	0	–	5	–	0	4	–	5	–	0
SW Presbyterian			–					–
+ – Conference co-champions

The 1903 Sewanee Tigers football team represented the Sewanee Tigers of Sewanee: The University of the South in the 1903 Southern Intercollegiate Athletic Association football season.

== Schedule ==
Date	Opponent	Site	Result	Attendance	Source
October 3	Mooney*	Hardee Field; Sewanee, TN	W 23–0		
October 20	Cumberland (TN)	Hardee Field; Sewanee, TN	W 6–0		
October 24	Tennessee Docs*	Hardee Field; Sewanee, TN	W 52–0		
October 31	at Auburn	Riverside Park; Montgomery, AL	W 47–0		
November 2	at Alabama	West End Park; Birmingham, AL	W 23–0		
November 7	at Nashville	Peabody Field; Nashville, TN	W 6–0		
November 14	at Tennessee	Baldwin Park; Knoxville, TN	W 17–0		
November 26	at Vanderbilt	Dudley Field; Nashville, TN (rivalry)	L 5–10	4,000	
*Non-conference game

== Game summaries ==
=== Mooney ===
The season opened with a defeat of Mooney School by a 23–0 score.

=== Tennessee Medical ===
The Tennessee Medicos were beaten 6–0.

=== Cumberland ===
Cumberland at Sewanee

Team	1	2	Total
Cumberland	0	0	0
• Sewanee	0	6	6

- Date: October 20
- Location: Sewanee, Tennessee
- Game start: 3:00 p. m.
- Referee: Roszel

Sewanee gave the greatest team in Cumberland history its only loss.. Henry D. Phillips plowed through the line for the deciding score.

The starting lineup was Wheless (left end), L. Kirby-Smith (left tackle), Blount (left guard), Watkins (center), Phillips (right guard), Brong (right tackle), Jones (right end), Scarbrough (quarterback), Colmore (left halfback), E. Kirby Smith (right halfback), Stewart (fullback).

=== Auburn ===
Sewanee at Auburn

Team	1	2	Total
• Sewanee	23	24	47
Auburn	0	0	0

- Date: November 12
- Location: Montgomery, Alabama

Sewanee easily beat Auburn 47–0. The first half was all Sewanee. Phillips made the first touchdown. After an Auburn fumble, Shaffer made the next touchdown. Phillips soon made the next touchdown. Kirby-Smith the next. In the second half, Auburn played better, but got nowhere near Sewanee's goal. Phillips had three touchdowns in the second half, "by some of the finest line bucking ever seen here."

The starting lineup was Wheless (left end), L. Kirby-Smith (left tackle), Harper (left guard), Watkins (center), Phillips (right guard), Brong (right tackle), Jones (right end), Scarbrough (quarterback), Colmore (left halfback), Shaffer (right halfback), Stewart (fullback).

=== Alabama ===
Sewanee beat Alabama 23–0 in the first match between the two schools since 1896. The game was originally scheduled to be played in Tuscaloosa, but was subsequently moved to West End Park in Birmingham in an effort to increase gate receipts. Phillips made the first score.

The starting lineup was Wheless (left end), Brong (left tackle), Harper (left guard), Watkins (center), Phillips (right guard), L. Kirby-Smith (right tackle), Jones (right end), Scarbrough (quarterback), Colmore (left halfback), E. Kirby Smith (right halfback), Stewart (fullback).

=== Nashville ===
Sewanee defeated the Nashville Garnet and Blue 6–0. In 1903, Wreidt, the team's coach, resigned and Nashville football was threatened with its end, but it survived for a few more years.

=== Tennessee ===
Tennessee was beaten 17–0.

=== Vanderbilt ===
Sewanee at Vanderbilt

Team	1	2	Total
Sewanee	0	5	5
• Vanderbilt	5	5	10

- Date: November 26
- Location: Dudley Field
  Nashville, Tennessee
- Game attendance: 4,000
- Referee: Robothen

Sewanee was defeated by rival Vanderbilt, 10–5, the first team to even score on the Tigers. Sewanee was crippled in the first half by the loss of Stewart, who fractured his ankle in a scrimmage before the game. He tried to play through it, but had to be helped off the field. John J. Tigert, later a prominent educator, got Vanderbilt's first touchdown. Sewanee tied the score with a touchdown in the second half. Later, Vanderbilt had the ball at the 4-yard line third down. "As great a stand of a football elevve was that of Sewaee before Vanderbilt's winning touchdown was made." On third down from the 1-yard line the center Perry fell on a fumble. Sewanee protested that the runner was down, but Vanderbilt was awarded the touchdown. "Vanderbilt, in fact all Nashville, is wild with joy tonight. Sewanee is looking forward to next Thanksgiving."

The starting lineup was Wheless (left end), Brong (left tackle), Harper (left guard), Watkins (center), Phillips (right guard), E. Kirby-Smith (right tackle), Jones (right end), Scarbrough (quarterback), Sawrie (left halfback), Colmore (right halfback), Stewart (fullback).

== Players ==
=== Varsity lettermen ===
==== Line ====
Player	Position	Games started	Hometown	Prep school	Height	Weight	Age
J. L. Brong	tackle						
Emile Harper	guard						
J. W. Jones	end						
Joseph Lee Kirby-Smith	tackle		Sewanee, Tennessee			156	21
Ephraim Kirby-Smith	tackle		Sewanee, Tennessee			156	19
Henry D. Phillips	guard				6'2"	185	21
Miles Watkins	center						
Wesley E. Wheless	end						

==== Backfield ====
Player	Position	Games started	Hometown	Prep school	Height	Weight	Age
John Scarbrough	quarterback		Rockdale, Texas			135	18
Rupert Colmore	halfback		Sewanee, Tennessee			155	20
Nate Sawrie	back						
W. Meacham Stewart	back						

==== Subs ====
Player	Position	Hometown	Prep school	Height	Weight	Age
G. A. Blount
Robert Bostrom
Roland Crownover
William Poyner
J. W. Price
I. J. Rosebrough
John Schaffer
Henry Sneed
David Wettlin
