= Oliver Huie =

American football player and coach (1877–1951)

Biographical details
- Born: September 9, 1878; Clayton County, Georgia
- Died: December 22, 1951 (aged 73); Atlanta, Georgia

Playing career
- 1901: Georgia Tech
- Position: Left halfback

Coaching career (HC unless noted)
- 1903: Georgia Tech

Head coaching record
- Overall: 3–5

Oliver Jones Huie (September 9, 1878 – December 22, 1951) was an American college football player and coach. He served as the head coach for Georgia Tech in 1903.

Huie was born in Clayton County, Georgia. He attended Georgia School of Technology (later Georgia Institute of Technology) and played on the football team in 1901. He later attended Davidson College (later University). After graduation, Huie worked for the Southern Bell Telephone and Telegraph Company. On July 20, 1903, he was selected by Georgia Tech's athletic association to coach the football team for the 1903 Georgia Tech season. Under Huie, the team registered only its second multi-win season since 1893. Georgia Tech finished 3–5. Huie did not return to coach the following year as Georgia Tech hired John Heisman.

Huie continued to work for Southern Bell at least through World War I. He died in Atlanta, Georgia on December 24, 1951.

== Head coaching record ==
| Year | Team | Overall | Conference | Standing | Bowl/playoffs |
|---|---|---|---|---|---|
Georgia Tech (Southern Intercollegiate Athletic Association) (1903)
| 1903 | Georgia Tech | 3–5 | 1–4 | 13th | |
| Georgia Tech: | | 3–5 | 1–4 | | |
| Total: | | 3–5 | | | |
