= John Maxwell (American football) =

American college football player (1884–1953)

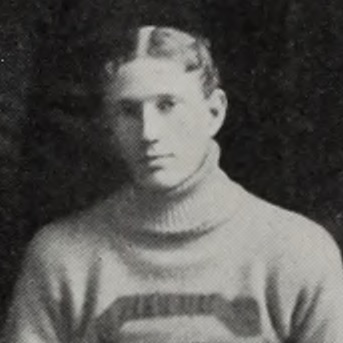
- Maxwell cropped from 1902 Clemson football team photo

Clemson Tigers
- Position: Quarterback
- Class: 1904

Personal information
- Born: August 14, 1884; Anderson, South Carolina, U.S.
- Died: September 19, 1953 (aged 69) near Cobbs Creek, Virginia, U.S.
- Listed height: 5 ft 9 in (1.75 m)
- Listed weight: 149 lb (68 kg)

Career information
- College: Clemson (1902–1903)

Awards and highlights
- SIAA championship (1902, 1903); All-Southern (1902, 1903); Clemson Athletics Hall of Fame

John Maxwell (August 13, 1884 – September 18, 1953) was an American college football and college baseball player. He played football as a quarterback at Clemson Agricultural College—now known as Clemson University—from 1902 to 1903.

== Early life ==
Maxwell was born on August 13, 1884, in Anderson, South Carolina.

== College career ==
=== Football ===
Maxwell was a quarterback for coach John Heisman's Clemson Tigers of Clemson University, and is a member of Clemson's athletic Hall of Fame. In 1915, Heisman selected Maxwell as one of just two quarterbacks for his list of the 30 greatest Southern football players. Heisman noted he learned fast, "never have I seen a man develop at the rate he did."

==== 1902 ====
Maxwell started every game in 1902. One account from his first game against North Carolina A&M reads "Maxwell, the new quarterback, is a jewel." The Tigers closed the season with an 11 to 0 win over the Tennessee Volunteers. Tennessee back "Toots" Douglas holds the record for the longest punt in his school's history, when he punted a ball 109 yards (the field length was 110 yards in those days) with the help of the wind during the Clemson game. Heisman described the kick:

...One quick glance he cast overhead– no doubt to make sure that howling was still the same old hurricane. I knew at once what he proposed to do. The snap was perfect. "Toots" caught the ball, took two smart steps and – BLAM!–away shot the ball as though from the throat of Big Bertha. And, say, in his palmiest mathematical mood, I don't believe Sir Isaac Newton himself could have figured a more perfect trajectory to fit with that cyclone. Onward and upward, upward and onward, the crazy thing flew like a brainchild of Jules Verne. I thought it would clear the Blue Ridge Mountains. Our safety man, the great Johnny Maxwell, was positioned 50 yards behind our rush line, yet the punt sailed over his head like a phantom aeroplane. Finally, it came down, but still uncured of its wanderlust it started in to roll–toward our goal, of course, with Maxwell chasing and damning it with every step and breath. Finally it curled up and died on our one-foot line, after a bowstring journey of just 109 yards.

Both Maxwell and Douglas were selected All-Southern in different publications.

==== 1903 ====
The 1903 team faced Cumberland in a game billed as the championship of the South, which ended in an 11–11 tie. At the start of the second half, Maxwell returned the kickoff 100 yards for Clemson's first touchdown. It was John Heisman's last game as Clemson head coach. Maxwell was selected All-Southern.

=== Baseball ===
Maxwell was also a catcher on the Clemson Tigers baseball team.

== Later life and death ==
Maxwell lived for many years in Richmond, Virginia, where he was president of the phosphate division of the Virginia-Carolina Chemical Corporation. He retired in the 1940s, and purchased the Hesse Farm on the Piankatank River, near Cobbs Creek, Virginia. He resided there in his retirement until his sudden death there, on September 18, 1953.
