= 1903 LSU Tigers football team =

American college football season

1903 LSU Tigers football
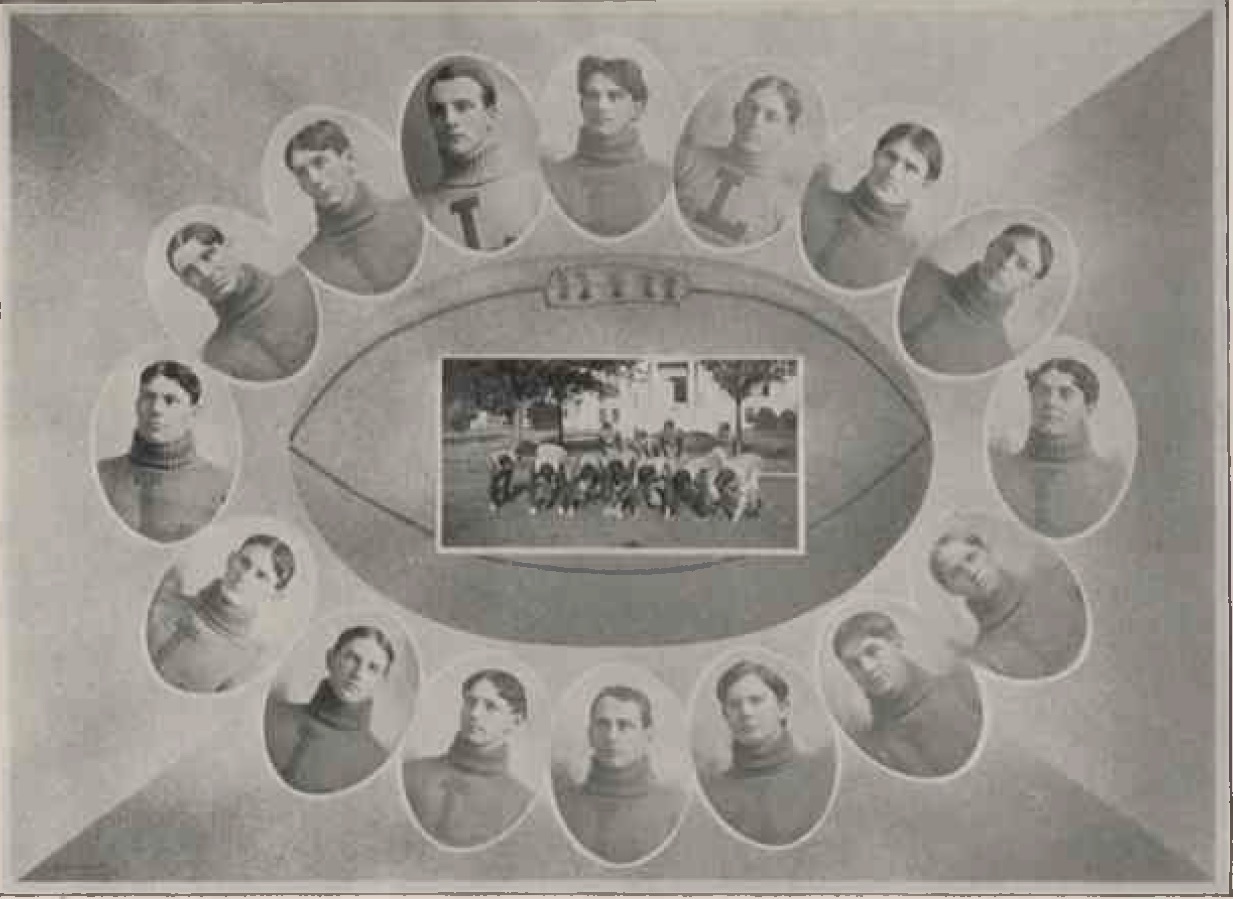
- Conference: Southern Intercollegiate Athletic Association
- Record: 4–5 (0–5 SIAA)
- Head coach: W. S. Borland (3rd season)
- Captain: John J. Coleman
- Home stadium: State Field

1903 Southern Intercollegiate Athletic Association football standings
	Conf.					Overall
Team	W		L		T	W		L		T
Clemson +	2	–	0	–	1	4	–	1	–	1
Cumberland (TN) +	4	–	1	–	1	6	–	1	–	1
Sewanee	5	–	1	–	0	7	–	1	–	0
Vanderbilt	5	–	1	–	1	6	–	1	–	1
Mississippi A&M	2	–	0	–	2	3	–	0	–	2
Georgia	3	–	2	–	0	3	–	4	–	0
Ole Miss	1	–	1	–	1	2	–	1	–	1
Texas	0	–	0	–	1	5	–	1	–	2
Kentucky State	0	–	0	–	0	6	–	1	–	0
Alabama	3	–	4	–	0	3	–	4	–	0
Auburn	2	–	3	–	0	4	–	3	–	0
Tennessee	2	–	4	–	0	4	–	5	–	0
Georgia Tech	1	–	4	–	0	3	–	5	–	0
Tulane	0	–	1	–	1	2	–	2	–	1
Mercer	0	–	1	–	0	0	–	1	–	0
Nashville	0	–	2	–	0	1	–	3	–	0
LSU	0	–	5	–	0	4	–	5	–	0
SW Presbyterian			–					–
+ – Conference co-champions

The 1903 LSU Tigers football team represented the LSU of Louisiana State University during the 1903 Southern Intercollegiate Athletic Association football season. 1903 was W. S. Borland's third and final season as LSU head coach as he finished 4–5 for the season (15–7 in all three years as head coach). The 1903 season broke the previous season's record for most games played (seven) with nine games. The Tigers played four home games; three in Baton Rouge and one in New Orleans, but were on the road the rest of the season. For the 1903 season, point values were different from those used in contemporary games. In 1903 a touchdown was worth five points, a field goal was worth five points and a conversion (PAT) was worth one point.

== Schedule ==
Date	Opponent	Site	Result	Source
October 14	LSU alumni*	State Field; Baton Rouge, LA	W 16–0	
October 24	Eagles-New Orleans*	State Field; Baton Rouge, LA	W 33–0	
October 30	at Louisiana Industrial*	Ruston, LA	W 16–0	
October 31	at Shreveport Athletic Association*	Ball Park; Shreveport, LA	W 5–0	
November 7	at Mississippi A&M	Starkville Fairgrounds; Starkville, MS (rivalry)	L 0–11	
November 9	at Alabama	The Quad; Tuscaloosa, AL (rivalry)	L 0–18	
November 11	at Auburn	Drill Field; Auburn, AL (rivalry)	L 0–12	
November 16	Cumberland (TN)	State Field; Baton Rouge, LA	L 0–41	
November 21	vs. Ole Miss	Athletic Park; New Orleans, LA (rivalry)	L 0–11	
*Non-conference game
