= Marvin O. Bridges =

American athlete and coach (1878–1962)

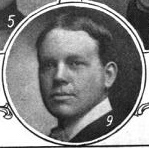
- Bridges c. 1903

Biographical details
- Born: April 1, 1878; Bedford County, Tennessee, US
- Died: January 13, 1962 (aged 83); Nashville, Tennessee, US

Playing career
- 1902–1903: Cumberland
- 1905: Allegheny
- 1905: Washington & Jefferson
- Positions: Guard, fullback

Coaching career (HC unless noted)
- 1904: University of Florida at Lake City

Head coaching record
- Overall: 0–5

Accomplishments and honors

Awards
- All-Southern (1903)

Marvin Orestus Bridges (April 1, 1878 – January 13, 1962) was an American football, basketball, and baseball player and football coach. He served in the Spanish-American War, and is buried at Arlington National Cemetery.

== Cumberland ==
Marvin Bridges was prominent guard for the Cumberland Bulldogs of Cumberland University. His brother M. L. Bridges also played on the team. Both he and his brother were listed as from "Cornersville," and stood some 6 foot 4 inches, weighing some 225 pounds. Marvin was also known as a fine punter, and kicked the extra points.

=== 1903 ===
Marvin Bridges was selected All-Southern from his guard position in 1903. That year Bridges and Red Smith helped lead Cumberland to a defeat of Vanderbilt and a tie of coach John Heisman's Clemson Tigers football team to finish the season in the game billed at the "SIAA championship game" in Montgomery, Alabama on Thanksgiving Day. It was Heisman's last game as Clemson's coach. At Cumberland, Bridges was a member of the Rho chapter of the Pi Kappa Alpha fraternity. The fraternity's football prestige was said to rest on Red Smith and the two Bridges brothers, noting Marvin was "as handsome as the gods."

== University of Florida ==
He later coached for the football team at the University of Florida at Lake City in 1904, one of the four predecessor institutions to the modern University of Florida and the contemporary Florida Gators football team, which started in 1906. Bridges' "White and Blue" teams compiled an 0–5 record and were outscored 224 to 0 by the likes of Mike Donahue's first year at Alabama Polytechnic Institute, Georgia, and John Heisman's first year at Georgia Tech. He founded UF's Alpha Eta chapter of Pi Kappa Alpha at Lake City on November 17, 1904.

That same year, coach Branch Rickey was happy to get Bridges to Allegheny College, but Bridges bolted for pay to Washington & Jefferson. Bridges played a handful of years in the minor leagues as a pitcher.
