= 1903 Georgia Bulldogs football team =

American college football season

1903 Georgia Bulldogs football
- Conference: Southern Intercollegiate Athletic Association
- Record: 3–4 (3–2 SIAA)
- Head coach: Marvin M. Dickinson (1st season)
- Captain: Harold Ketron
- Home stadium: Herty Field

1903 Southern Intercollegiate Athletic Association football standings
	Conf.					Overall
Team	W		L		T	W		L		T
Clemson +	2	–	0	–	1	4	–	1	–	1
Cumberland (TN) +	4	–	1	–	1	6	–	1	–	1
Sewanee	5	–	1	–	0	7	–	1	–	0
Vanderbilt	5	–	1	–	1	6	–	1	–	1
Mississippi A&M	2	–	0	–	2	3	–	0	–	2
Georgia	3	–	2	–	0	3	–	4	–	0
Ole Miss	1	–	1	–	1	2	–	1	–	1
Texas	0	–	0	–	1	5	–	1	–	2
Kentucky State	0	–	0	–	0	6	–	1	–	0
Alabama	3	–	4	–	0	3	–	4	–	0
Auburn	2	–	3	–	0	4	–	3	–	0
Tennessee	2	–	4	–	0	4	–	5	–	0
Georgia Tech	1	–	4	–	0	3	–	5	–	0
Tulane	0	–	1	–	1	2	–	2	–	1
Mercer	0	–	1	–	0	0	–	1	–	0
Nashville	0	–	2	–	0	1	–	3	–	0
LSU	0	–	5	–	0	4	–	5	–	0
SW Presbyterian			–					–
+ – Conference co-champions

The 1903 Georgia Bulldogs football team represented the University of Georgia during the 1903 Southern Intercollegiate Athletic Association football season. The Bulldogs completed the season with a 3–4 record. Georgia lost to Clemson, but beat rivals Georgia Tech and Auburn. This was the Georgia Bulldogs' first season under the guidance of head coach Marvin M. Dickinson.

John Heisman last year as head coach of Clemson was 1903. During his four years at Clemson, Georgia was unable to muster a single win, was shut out twice and scored only 10 points. While Heisman was head coach of Auburn, Georgia had fared a little better, managing a win and a tie and recording a 1–2–1 record. Nevertheless, during the eight meetings with Heisman-coached teams from 1895 to 1903, Georgia was 1–6–1.

== Schedule ==
Date	Opponent	Site	Result	Source
October 10	Clemson	Herty Field; Athens, GA (rivalry)	L 0–29	
October 17	South Carolina*	Herty Field; Athens, GA (rivalry)	L 0–17	
October 24	at Georgia Tech	Piedmont Park; Atlanta, GA (rivalry)	W 38–0	
October 31	vs. Vanderbilt	Brisbine Park; Atlanta, GA (rivalry)	L 0–33	
November 7	at Tennessee	Baldwin Park; Knoxville, TN (rivalry)	W 5–0	
November 14	at Savannah Athletic Association*	Bolton Street Park; Savannah, GA	L 0–6	
November 26	vs. Auburn	Brisbane Park; Atlanta, GA (rivalry)	W 22–13	
*Non-conference game
