= Charles Eshleman =

American physician and football coach (1880–1976)

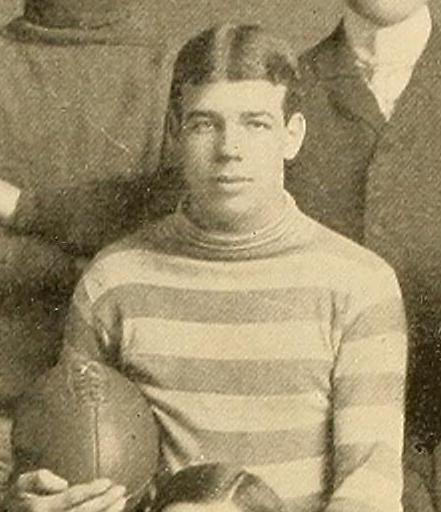
- Eshleman as Tulane captain in 1898

Biographical details
- Born: May 18, 1880; New Orleans, Louisiana, U.S.
- Died: June 6, 1976 (aged 96); Louisiana, U.S.

Playing career
- 1898–1900: Tulane
- Positions: Fullback, halfback

Coaching career (HC unless noted)
- 1903: Tulane

Head coaching record
- Overall: 2–2–1

Charles Leverich Eshleman (May 18, 1880 – June 6, 1976) was an American physician and college football coach. He served as the Tulane University football coach for one season, and amassed a 2–2–1 record in 1903.

== Biography ==
Eshleman was born in New Orleans, Louisiana on May 18, 1880 to parents Benjamin Franklin and Fannie (née Leverich) Eshleman. He attended Tulane University, where he played college football from 1898 to 1900 as a fullback and halfback. He served as the team captain in 1898 and 1899. Eshleman returned to coach Tulane for the 1903 season, and his team amassed a 2–2–1 record. While at Tulane, he set the Southern Intercollegiate Athletic Association record in the 220-yard dash at 23.2 seconds. He was a member of Alpha Tau Omega.

In 1900, he studied literature at Tulane, and in 1904, Eshleman received his medical doctorate from Tulane. In the spring of 1904, he attended the Johns Hopkins University School of Medicine in Baltimore, Maryland to take graduate medical courses. Eshleman was "known for his altruism as well as for his notable achievements in the highly specialized field of Internal Medicine." He taught at the Tulane School of Medicine. In 1918, he was an associate professor of clinical medicine and the acting medical officer at Tulane's Newcomb College.

Eshleman sat on the Board of Tulane from 1936 to 1959, and was an emeritus member of the board from 1959 until 1976. In 1979, Tulane inducted Eshleman into the Tulane Athletics Hall Of Fame. He died in 1976.

== Head coaching record ==
Year	Team	Overall	Conference	Standing	Bowl/playoffs
Tulane Olive and Blue (Southern Intercollegiate Athletic Association) (1903)
1903	Tulane	2–2–1	0–1–1	15th	
Tulane:		2–2–1	0–1–1		
Total:		2–2–1			
