= 1903 Tulane Olive and Blue football team =

American college football season

1903 Tulane Olive and Blue football
- Conference: Southern Intercollegiate Athletic Association
- Record: 2–2–1 (0–1–1 SIAA)
- Head coach: Charles Eshleman (1st season)
- Captain: Ralph Wood
- Home stadium: Athletic Park

1903 Southern Intercollegiate Athletic Association football standings
	Conf.					Overall
Team	W		L		T	W		L		T
Clemson +	2	–	0	–	1	4	–	1	–	1
Cumberland (TN) +	4	–	1	–	1	6	–	1	–	1
Sewanee	5	–	1	–	0	7	–	1	–	0
Vanderbilt	5	–	1	–	1	6	–	1	–	1
Mississippi A&M	2	–	0	–	2	3	–	0	–	2
Georgia	3	–	2	–	0	3	–	4	–	0
Ole Miss	1	–	1	–	1	2	–	1	–	1
Texas	0	–	0	–	1	5	–	1	–	2
Kentucky State	0	–	0	–	0	6	–	1	–	0
Alabama	3	–	4	–	0	3	–	4	–	0
Auburn	2	–	3	–	0	4	–	3	–	0
Tennessee	2	–	4	–	0	4	–	5	–	0
Georgia Tech	1	–	4	–	0	3	–	5	–	0
Tulane	0	–	1	–	1	2	–	2	–	1
Mercer	0	–	1	–	0	0	–	1	–	0
Nashville	0	–	2	–	0	1	–	3	–	0
LSU	0	–	5	–	0	4	–	5	–	0
SW Presbyterian			–					–
+ – Conference co-champions

The 1903 Tulane Olive and Blue football team represented Tulane University during the 1903 Southern Intercollegiate Athletic Association football season.

== Schedule ==
Date	Time	Opponent	Site	Result	Attendance	Source
October 31		Meridian Athletic Club*	Athletic Park; New Orleans, LA	W 46–0	400	
November 7	3:30 p.m.	Shreveport Athletic Club*	Athletic Park; New Orleans, LA	L 0–23		
November 18	3:30 p.m.	Cumberland (TN)	Athletic Park; New Orleans, LA	L 0–28		
November 26	3:00 p.m.	Richmond*	Athletic Park; New Orleans, LA	W 18–5		
December 5	3:30 p.m.	Mississippi A&M	Athletic Park; New Orleans, LA	T 0–0		
*Non-conference game; All times are in Central time
