= William Penn Bates =

American athlete and coach (1879–1956)

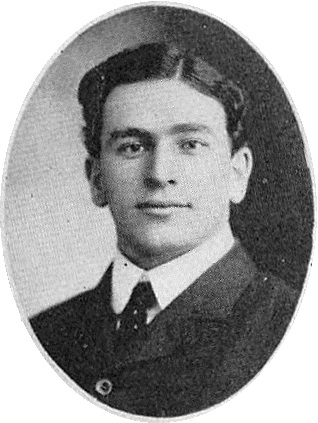
- Bates at Auburn in 1903

Biographical details
- Born: June 7, 1879; Providence, Rhode Island, U.S.
- Died: March 2, 1956 (aged 76); Sarasota, Florida, U.S.

Playing career

Football
- 1898–1901: Brown

Baseball
- c. 1900: Brown
- Positions: Fullback (football); First baseman, pitcher (baseball)

Coaching career (HC unless noted)

Football
- 1902: Northwestern Academy (IL)
- 1903: Auburn
- 1904–1905: Franklin & Marshall

Basketball
- 1903–1905: Franklin & Marshall

Baseball
- 1905–1906: Franklin & Marshall

Administrative career (AD unless noted)
- 1902–1903: Northwestern Academy (IL)

Head coaching record
- Overall: 8–19 (college football); 11–9 (college basketball); 6–14–1 (college baseball)

William Penn Bates (June 7, 1879 – March 2, 1956) was an American college football player, coach of college football, college basketball, and college baseball, engineer, and hospital administrator. He played football as a fullback at Brown University for four years, including as team captain in 1901. Bates served as the head football coach at Auburn University in 1903 and at Franklin & Marshall College from 1904 to 1905, compiling a career coaching record of 8–19. Bates was also the head basketball coach at Franklin & Marshall from 1903 to 1905, tallying a mark of 11–9, and the head baseball coach at the school from 1905 to 1906, notching a record of 6–14–1.

== Early life and college career ==
Bates was born on June 7, 1879, in Providence, Rhode Island, to Dr. William Lincoln and Dr. Martha Boyce Bates.

== Coaching career ==
After graduating from Brown in 1902, Bates went to Northwestern University as a graduate student. In the fall of 1902, he coached the football team at Northwestern Academy. He also served as athletic director for Northwestern Academy into 1903, when he was offered a coaching position by the University of Kentucky. The University of Texas was also interested in hiring him.

In late February 1903, Bates accepted an offer to coached the football team at Auburn University for a salary of $1,000. He led the 1903 Auburn Tigers football team to a record of 4–3.

The following year, Bates became the head football coach at Franklin & Marshall College located in Lancaster, Pennsylvania. He held that position for the 1904 and 1905 seasons, compiling a record of 4–16.

== Later life and death ==
Bates worked as an engineer on the design of the Holland Tunnel. In 1928, he moved to Jamestown, Rhode Island to his assist his father in managing Bates Sanitorium. Upon his father's death in 1931, he became manager of the sanitorium. In 1944, Bates moved to Wakefield, Rhode Island. He died of a heart attack, on March 2, 1956, while vacationing in Sarasota, Florida.

== Head coaching record ==
=== College football ===
Year	Team	Overall	Conference	Standing	Bowl/playoffs
Auburn Tigers (Southern Intercollegiate Athletic Association) (1903)
1903	Auburn	4–3	2–3	10th	
Auburn:		4–3	2–3		
Franklin & Marshall (Independent) (1904–1905)
1904	Franklin & Marshall	0–10			
1905	Franklin & Marshall	4–6			
Franklin & Marshall:		4–16			
Total:		8–19			
