= Auxford Burks =

American football player and physician (1883–1938)

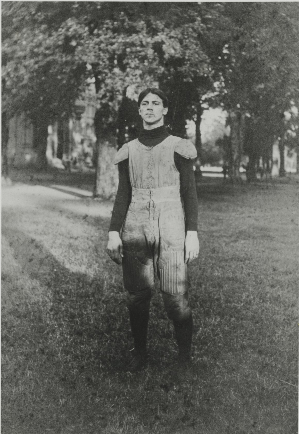
- Burks in his football uniform c. 1905

Profile
- Position: Running back

Personal information
- Born: January 24, 1883; Tuscaloosa, Alabama, U.S.
- Died: February 24, 1938 (aged 55); Orlando, Florida, U.S.

Career information
- College: Alabama (1902–1906)

Awards and highlights
- All-Southern (1905)

Bennett Auxford "B. A." Burks, Jr. (January 24, 1883 – February 24, 1938) was a college football player and physician.

== University of Alabama ==
Burks was a prominent running back for the Alabama Crimson White of the University of Alabama from 1902 to 1906. He was said to be the school's "first running back hero" who would "carry whole teams on his back." In 1915, John Heisman selected his 30 best Southern football players, and Burks was mentioned 16th. He was nominated though not selected for an Associated Press All-Time Southeast 1869-1919 era team. At Alabama he was a member of the Alpha Tau Omega fraternity.

=== 1905 ===
Burks was captain of the 1905 team, selected All-Southern the same year. Burks starred in the opening win of 17 to 0 over Maryville. A number of Alabama turnovers kept the game scoreless through halftime. T. S. Sims scored the first touchdown and Burks added a 95-yard return for a touchdown. "The overworked Burks, who appeared to bear the entire brunt of Alabama's offense," collapsed on the field during the second half of a 12 to 5 loss to Georgia Tech. Burks scored in the 30 to 0 victory over Auburn in what was then the largest crowd ever to see a game in Birmingham (4,000).

=== 1906 ===
In the Iron Bowl of 1906 he scored all of Alabama's points in a 10 to 0 victory.

== High school football ==
In 1908 he coached the Barton Academy high school football team.

== Physician ==
Burks was the college physician of Rollins College for 12 years. When Rollins opened a 7-bed infirmary in 1933, he and one Dr. Ruth Hart cared for students, assisted by a staff of nurses.

He died of a throat malady on February 24, 1938.
