= Joseph Lee Kirby-Smith =

American football player and dermatologist (1882–1939)

- Born: April 16, 1882; Sewanee, Tennessee, U.S.
- Died: November 5, 1939 (aged 57); Jacksonville, Florida, U.S.
- Occupation: Dermatologist
- Football career

Profile
- Position: Tackle

Personal information
- Listed weight: 156 lb (71 kg)

Career information
- College: Sewanee (1899–1903)

Awards and highlights
- SIAA championship (1899, 1903); All-Southern (1902, 1903)

Joseph Lee Kirby-Smith (April 16, 1882 – November 5, 1939) was an American college football player and dermatologist. He was once instructor of dermatology at New York University.

== Early life ==
Kirby-Smith was born on April 16, 1882, in Sewanee, Tennessee, the son of American Civil War general Edmund Kirby-Smith and his wife Cassie Selden.

=== Sewanee ===
Kirby-Smith was an All-Southern tackle for the Sewanee Tigers of Sewanee: The University of the South, a member of its undefeated 1899 "Iron Men." He was selected All-Southern in 1902 and 1903; and was captain in the latter year. He graduated with an M.D. in 1906. At Sewanee he was a member of the Phi Delta Theta fraternity.

== World War I ==
Kirby-Smith served in the Public Health Service during the First World War.

== Jacksonville ==
Kirby-Smith moved to Jacksonville, Florida, in 1911, practicing as a dermatologist and gaining distinction throughout Florida and the south. In 1926, he was invited to lecture to the London Medical Association on the subject of tropical medicine.

=== Death ===
Kirby-Smith died in his Jacksonville home, on November 5, 1939, following a brief illness.
