= 1903 Vanderbilt Commodores football team =

American college football season

1903 Vanderbilt Commodores football
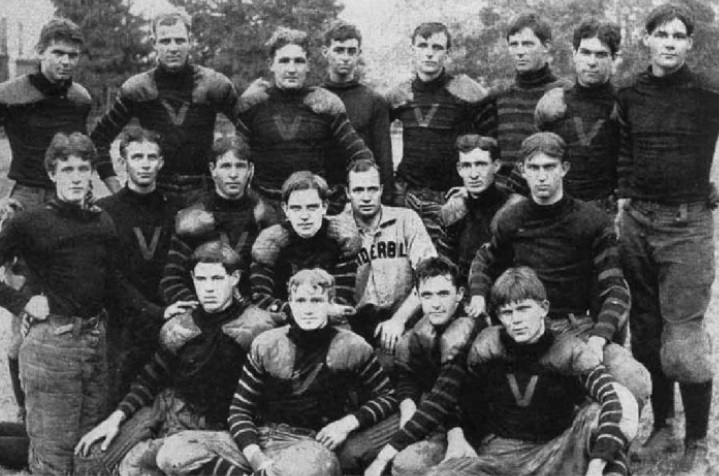
- Conference: Southern Intercollegiate Athletic Association
- Record: 6–1–1 (5–1–1 SIAA)
- Head coach: James R. Henry (1st season)
- Captain: Frank Kyle
- Home stadium: Dudley Field

1903 Southern Intercollegiate Athletic Association football standings
	Conf.					Overall
Team	W		L		T	W		L		T
Clemson +	2	–	0	–	1	4	–	1	–	1
Cumberland (TN) +	4	–	1	–	1	6	–	1	–	1
Sewanee	5	–	1	–	0	7	–	1	–	0
Vanderbilt	5	–	1	–	1	6	–	1	–	1
Mississippi A&M	2	–	0	–	2	3	–	0	–	2
Georgia	3	–	2	–	0	3	–	4	–	0
Ole Miss	1	–	1	–	1	2	–	1	–	1
Texas	0	–	0	–	1	5	–	1	–	2
Kentucky State	0	–	0	–	0	6	–	1	–	0
Alabama	3	–	4	–	0	3	–	4	–	0
Auburn	2	–	3	–	0	4	–	3	–	0
Tennessee	2	–	4	–	0	4	–	5	–	0
Georgia Tech	1	–	4	–	0	3	–	5	–	0
Tulane	0	–	1	–	1	2	–	2	–	1
Mercer	0	–	1	–	0	0	–	1	–	0
Nashville	0	–	2	–	0	1	–	3	–	0
LSU	0	–	5	–	0	4	–	5	–	0
SW Presbyterian			–					–
+ – Conference co-champions

The 1903 Vanderbilt Commodores football team represented Vanderbilt University during the 1903 Southern Intercollegiate Athletic Association football season. James R. Henry coached Vanderbilt for one season in 1903. His squad finished the season with a 6–1–1 record. The season was marred only by the upset loss to Cumberland. John J. Tigert and Bob Blake were both Rhodes Scholars.

== Schedule ==
Date	Opponent	Site	Result	Attendance	Source
October 3	Cumberland (TN)	Dudley Field; Nashville, TN	L 0–6		
October 10	Alabama	Dudley Field; Nashville, TN	W 30–0		
October 17	Tennessee	Dudley Field; Nashville, TN (rivalry)	W 40–0		
October 24	Ole Miss	Dudley Field; Nashville, TN (rivalry)	W 33–0		
October 31	vs. Georgia	Brisbane Park; Atlanta, GA (rivalry)	W 33–0		
November 6	at Texas	Varsity Athletic Field; Austin TX	T 5–5	1,200	
November 14	Washington University*	Dudley Field; Nashville, TN	W 41–0		
November 26	Sewanee	Dudley Field; Nashville, TN (rivalry)	W 10–5	4,000	
*Non-conference game

== Before the season ==
After the last game of the 1902 seasomn, Walter H. Watkins announced his resignation of his position as head coach of the Vanderbilt football and baseball teams in order that he devote attention to the study of law. Vanderbilt made an effort to secure the services of coach Neil Snow, who was the University of Nashville (Peabody) coach. (Note: Snow resigned from Nashville never to coach again, accepting a construction position in New York.)

== Game summaries ==
=== Cumberland (TN) ===
Cumberland at Vanderbilt

Team	1	2	Total
• Cumberland	6	0	6
Vanderbilt	0	0	0

- Date: October 3
- Location: Nashville, Tennessee
- Game start: 3:00 p. m.
- Referee: E. A. Wreidt

Cumberland upset the Commodores 6–0, the first time Cumberland ever scored on Vanderbilt. Four minutes after the game started, Waterhouse had the decisive touchdown. M. O. Bridges had his right collarbone broken.

The starting lineup was B. Blake (left end), Pritchard (left tackle), Brown (left guard), Perry (center), Patterson (right guard), Graham (right tackle), Bryan (right end), Kyle (quarterback), D. Blake (left halfback), Hamilton (right halfback), Tigert (fullback).

=== Alabama ===
Vanderbilt, outweighing Alabama 15 pounds to the man, beat Alabama 30–0, in the first all-time meeting between the schools at Dudley Field. Frank Kyle starred with runs of 35, 30, 50, and 48 yards.

Vanderbilt took a 12–0 halftime lead after first half touchdowns were scored first by Ed Hamilton and followed by John J. Tigert. The Commodores then closed the game with three touchdowns in the second half scored by Hamilton, Dan Blake and Bob Blake for the 30–0 victory. Tigert converted all five PAT's in their victory.

The starting lineup was B. Blake (left end), Graham (left tackle), Brown (left guard), Perry (center), Patterson (right guard), Pritchard (right tackle), G. Jones (right end), Howell (quarterback), Kyle (left halfback), Hamilton (right halfback), Tigert (fullback).

=== Tennessee ===
Jones and John J. Tigert starred as the Tennessee Volunteers were beaten 40–0.

The starting lineup was B. Blake (left end), Pritchard (left tackle), B. Brown (left guard), Perry (center), Patterson (right guard), Graham (right tackle), D. Blake (right end), Kyle (quarterback), Tigert (left halfback), Jones (right halfback), Hamilton (fullback).

=== Ole Miss ===
In Mississippi, the Commodores beat Ole Miss 33–0.

=== Georgia ===
The Georgia Bulldogs could not check Vanderbilt's end runs and were easily beaten 33–0.

=== Texas ===
Vanderbilt tied the Texas Longhorns 5–5.

=== Washington University ===
Vanderbilt defeated Washington University by as core of 41–0.

=== Sewanee ===
Sewanee at Vanderbilt

Team	1	2	Total
Sewanee	0	5	5
• Vanderbilt	5	5	10

- Date: November 26
- Location: Dudley Field
  Nashville, Tennessee
- Game attendance: 4,000
- Referee: Robothen

Vanderbilt gave rival Sewanee its only loss, 10–5, the first team to even score on the Tigers. Sewanee was crippled in the first half by the loss of Stewart, who fractured his ankle in a scrimmage before the game. He tried to play through it, but had to be helped off the field. John J. Tigert, later a prominent educator, got Vanderbilt's first touchdown. Sewanee tied the score with a touchdown in the second half. Later, Vanderbilt had the ball at the 4-yard line third down. "As great a stand of a football elevve was that of Sewaee before Vanderbilt's winning touchdown was made." On third down from the 1-yard line the center Perry fell on a fumble. Sewanee protested that the runner was down, but Vanderbilt was awarded the touchdown. "Vanderbilt, in fact all Nashville, is wild with joy tonight. Sewanee is looking forward to next Thanksgiving."

The starting lineup was B. Blake (left end), Pritchard (left tackle), Brown (left guard), Perry (center), Patterson (right guard), Graham (right tackle), D. Blake (right end), Kyle (quarterback), Tigert (left halfback), Bryan (right halfback), and Hamilton (fullback).

== SIAA championship ==
1903 met difficulty in determining an SIAA champion. Clemson had the best record, but lost to an inferior North Carolina team; and in the game to secure the SIAA title were tied by Cumberland. Clemson's John Heisman pushed strongly for Cumberland to share the SIAA title. Cumberland's strongest victory was its win over Vanderbilt. However, Sewanee beat Cumberland, yet suffered its only loss to Vanderbilt.

== Bibliography ==
- Vanderbilt University (1904). Vanderbilt University Quarterly. Vol. 4.
