= KBST =

KBST may refer to:

- KBST (AM), a radio station (1490 AM) licensed to Big Spring, Texas, United States
- KBST-FM, a radio station (95.7 FM) licensed to Big Spring, Texas, United States
- Barun Sengupta metro station (Kolkata Metro station code KBST), in Kolkata, West Bengal, India
- Belfast Municipal Airport (ICAO code KBST) in Belfast, Maine, United States
