= B21 =

B21 may refer to:

== Places ==
- Kepong–Selayang Highway (Selangor state route B21), Malaysia
- Autovía B-21, Spain; a motorway
- Harumi Chūō (station code B21), Tokyo BRT, Tokyo, Japan
- Mikamo Station (station code B21), Higashimiyoshi, Miyoshi, Tokushima, Japan; a train station
- Shin-Hōsono Station (station code B21), Seika, Kyoto, Japan; a train station
- Sugarloaf Regional Airport (FAA airport code B21), Franklin County, Maine, USA

== Transportation and vehicular ==
- B21 (New York City bus), a bus route serving Brooklyn, New York City, New York State, USA
- Unterseeboot B-21, a WW1 German submarine

=== Automotive ===
- BSA B21 (1937–1939), a British motorcycle made by Birmingham Small Arms Company, Birmingham, England
- Leyland B21 (1979–1985), a bus chassis manufactured by Leyland
- Volvo Redblock Engine (B21), an automotive engine
- Chevron B21, a racing prototype Group 5 sports car built by Chevron Cars Ltd

=== Aviation ===
- Northrop Grumman B-21 Raider, a 21st-century American stealth bomber
- North American XB-21 ("B-21"), an experimental bomber aircraft developed in the late 1930s
- B.21/35, British interwar twin-engined bomber

== Arts, entertainment, media ==
- B. 21 (Czech: Král a uhlíř, lit. 'King and Collier'), a Czech comic opera by Dvorak
- B21 (band), a British bhangra group

== Other uses ==
- B-21 (machine), a cypher machine invented by Boris Hagelin
- Burroughs B21, a variant of the Burroughs B20 microcomputer
- HLA-B21, an HLA - B serotype
- Boron-21 (B-21 or ^{21}B), an isotope of boron
- B21, a nuclear reactor at Dungeness nuclear power stations, Dungeness headland, southern Kent, England, UK

== See also ==
- Must B 21, a 2003 album by American singer will.i.am
- 21B (disambiguation)
