= List of airports in Maine =

This is a list of airports in Maine (a U.S. state), grouped by type and sorted by location. It contains all public-use and military airports in the state. Some private-use and former airports may be included where notable, such as airports that were previously public-use, those with commercial enplanements recorded by the FAA or airports assigned an IATA airport code.

== Airports ==
This list contains the following information:

- **City served** – The city generally associated with the airport, as per the airport's master record with the Federal Aviation Administration. This is not always the actual location since some airports are located in smaller towns outside of the city they serve. It is not meant to be a complete list of cities served, which can be found in or added to each airport's Wikipedia article.
- **FAA** – The location identifier assigned by the Federal Aviation Administration (FAA).
- **IATA** – The airport code assigned by the International Air Transport Association (IATA). Those that do not match the FAA code are shown in bold.
- **ICAO** – The location indicator assigned by the International Civil Aviation Organization (ICAO).
- **Airport name** – The official airport name. Those shown in **bold** indicate the airport has scheduled passenger service on commercial airlines.
- **Role** – One of four FAA airport categories, as per the 2021-2025 National Plan of Integrated Airport Systems (NPIAS) report released October 2019:
  - P-s: Commercial service – primary are publicly owned airports that receive scheduled passenger service and have more than 10,000 passenger boardings (enplanements) each year. Each primary airport is sub-classified by the FAA as one of the following four "hub" types (s):
    - L: Large hub that accounts for at least 1% of total U.S. passenger enplanements.
    - M: Medium hub that accounts for between 0.25% and 1% of total U.S. passenger enplanements.
    - S: Small hub that accounts for between 0.05% and 0.25% of total U.S. passenger enplanements.
    - N: Nonhub that accounts for less than 0.05% of total U.S. passenger enplanements, but more than 10,000 annual enplanements.
  - CS: Commercial service – nonprimary are publicly owned airports that receive scheduled passenger service and have at least 2,500 passenger boardings each year.
  - R: Reliever airports are designated by the FAA to relieve congestion at a large commercial service airport and to provide more general aviation access to the overall community.
  - GA: General aviation airports are the largest single group of airports in the U.S. airport system. They are public-use airports that do not have scheduled service or have scheduled service with less than 2,500 passenger boardings each year.
- **Enplanements** – The number of enplanements (commercial passenger boardings) that occurred at the airport in calendar year 2024, as per FAA records released 2025.

City served	FAA	IATA	ICAO	Airport name	Role	Enplanements (2024)
				**Commercial service – primary airports**		
Bangor	BGR	BGR	KBGR	**Bangor International Airport**	P-N	376,456
Portland	PWM	PWM	KPWM	**Portland International Jetport**	P-S	1,221,913
Presque Isle	PQI	PQI	KPQI	**Presque Isle International Airport**	P-N	21,633
Rockland	RKD	RKD	KRKD	**Knox County Regional Airport**	P-N	13,309
				**Commercial service – nonprimary airports**		
Augusta	AUG	AUG	KAUG	**Augusta State Airport**	CS	5,241
Bar Harbor	BHB	BHB	KBHB	**Hancock County–Bar Harbor Airport**	CS	11,042
				**Reliever airports**		
Auburn / Lewiston	LEW	LEW	KLEW	Auburn/Lewiston Municipal Airport	R	69
Sanford	SFM	SFM	KSFM	Sanford Seacoast Regional Airport (was Sanford Regional)	R	43
				**General aviation airports**		
Belfast	BST		KBST	Belfast Municipal Airport	GA	83
Bethel	0B1			Bethel Regional Airport	GA	15
Biddeford	B19			Biddeford Municipal Airport	GA	8
Brunswick	BXM	NHZ	KBXM	Brunswick Executive Airport	GA	39
Caribou	CAR	CAR	KCAR	Caribou Municipal Airport	GA	84
Carrabassett Valley	B21			Sugarloaf Regional Airport	GA	3
Dexter	1B0			Dexter Regional Airport	GA	0
Dover-Foxcroft	44B			Charles A. Chase Jr. Memorial Field	GA	0
Eastport	EPM		KEPM	Eastport Municipal Airport	GA	0
Frenchville	FVE	WFK	KFVE	Northern Aroostook Regional Airport	GA	28
Fryeburg	IZG	FRY	KIZG	Eastern Slopes Regional Airport	GA	22
Greenville	3B1			Greenville Municipal Airport	GA	0
Houlton	HUL	HUL	KHUL	Houlton International Airport	GA	29
Islesboro	57B			Islesboro Airport	GA	145
Jackman	59B			Newton Field	GA	2
Lincoln	LRG		KLRG	Lincoln Regional Airport	GA	1
Machias	MVM		KMVM	Machias Valley Airport	GA	1
Millinocket	MLT	MLT	KMLT	Millinocket Municipal Airport	GA	11
Norridgewock	OWK	OWK	KOWK	Central Maine Airport of Norridgewock	GA	0
Old Town	OLD	OLD	KOLD	Old Town Municipal Airport and Seaplane Base (Dewitt Field)	GA	17
Oxford	81B			Oxford County Regional Airport	GA	0
Pittsfield	2B7			Pittsfield Municipal Airport	GA	4
Princeton	PNN	PNN	KPNN	Princeton Municipal Airport	GA	40
Rangeley	8B0			Stephen A. Bean Municipal Airport	GA	44
Stonington	93B			Stonington Municipal Airport	GA	3
Waterville	WVL	WVL	KWVL	Waterville Robert LaFleur Airport	GA	73
Wiscasset	IWI	ISS	KIWI	Wiscasset Airport	GA	48
				**Other public-use airports** (not listed in NPIAS)		
Ashland	ME3			Bradford Camps Seaplane Base		
Augusta	M00			Augusta Seaplane Base		
Bangor	06B			Lucky Landing Marina and Seaplane Base		
Bowdoinham	08B			Merrymeeting Field		
Brewer	0B2			Brewer Airport		
Chesuncook	1ME			Chesuncook Lake House Seaplane Base		
Chesuncook	39B			Nugent Chamberlain Lake Seaplane Base		
Cutler	ME2			Cutler Regional Airport		
Deblois	43B			Deblois Flight Strip		
Dixfield	3S2			Swans Field		
East Winthrop	03M			Lakeside Marina Seaplane Base		
Eliot	3B4			Littlebrook Air Park		
Greenville	52B			Moosehead Aero Marine Seaplane Base		
Greenville Junction	21M			Currier's Seaplane Base		
Jackman	60B			Moose River Seaplane Base		
Levant	PG1			Griffin Field		
Limington	63B			Limington-Harmon Airport		
Livermore Falls	B10			Bowman Field		
Lubec	65B			Lubec Municipal Airport		
Meddybemps	66B			Gillespie Field		
Millinocket	70B			Millinocket Seaplane Base		
Mount Vernon	75B			Seven G's Seaplane Base		
Naples	5ME			Brandy Pond Seaplane Base		
Naples	76B			Long Lake Seaplane Base		
Norcross / Millinocket	78B			Buckhorn Camps Seaplane Base		
Patten	85B			Shin Pond Seaplane Base		
Portage Lake	87B			Portage Lake Municipal Seaplane Base		
Presque Isle	83B			Presque Isle Seaplane Base		
Rangeley	M57			Rangeley Lake Seaplane Base		
Saco	98M			Greaton Airfield		
Sinclair	92B			Long Lake Seaplane Base		
Swans Island	ME5			Banks Airport		7
Turner	3B5			Twitchell Airport		
Van Buren	05B			Van Buren Seaplane Base		
Wales	ME6			Wales Airport		
				**Notable private-use airports**		
Ashland	ME86			Libby Camps Seaplane Base		
Carmel	14ME			Ring Hill Airport (was public-use, FAA: 38B)		
Limestone	ME16	LIZ		Loring International Airport		
				**Notable former airports**		
Baring				St. Croix Airport (closed 1996-2004)		
Blue Hill	~~07B~~			Blue Hill Airport		
Brunswick	~~NHZ~~	~~NHZ~~	~~KNHZ~~	NAS Brunswick (closed 2011, now Brunswick Executive Airport)		

== See also ==
- Essential Air Service
- Maine World War II Army Airfields
