= Long Lake Seaplane Base =

Long Lake Seaplane Base may refer to:

- Long Lake Seaplane Base (Naples, Maine), in Naples, Maine, United States (FAA: 76B)
- Long Lake Seaplane Base (Sinclair, Maine), in Sinclair, Maine, United States (FAA: 92B)
- Long Lake Helms Seaplane Base, in Long Lake, New York, United States (FAA: NY9)
- Long Lake Sagamore Seaplane Base & Marina, in Long Lake, New York, United States (FAA: K03)

== See also ==
- Long Lake (disambiguation)
