= B50 =

B50 or B-50 may refer to:

- Boeing B-50 Superfortress, an strategic bomber airplane
- BSA B50, 500cc motorcycle
- International Statistical Classification of Diseases and Related Health Problems (ICD-10), code for Plasmodium falciparum malaria
- Leyland Royal Tiger, a UK bus
- Sicilian Defence, an Encyclopaedia of Chess Openings code
- A Vietnamese RPG-2 rocket-propelled grenade launcher
- B-50, alias of Gap-43 protein
- HLA-B50, a HLA-B serotype
- Bestune B50, a compact sedan
