= B49 =

B49 or B-49 may refer to:

- Bundesstraße 49, a German road
- B49 (New York City bus) in Brooklyn in the United States
- HLA-B49, an HLA-B serotype
- A postcode area in Alcester, Warwickshire, England
- Northrop YB-49, an American aircraft
- B-49 (submarine), a Soviet Foxtrot class diesel-electric hunter-killer submarine
- Persiaran Mokhtar Dahari, in Selangor, Malaysia
