= Bethel Airport (disambiguation) =

Bethel Airport may refer to:

- Bethel Airport in Bethel, Alaska, United States
  - Bethel Air Base, a former Army airfield that predated the airport
- Bethel Regional Airport in Bethel, Maine, United States
- Grimes Airport in Bethel, Pennsylvania, United States
- Sullivan County International Airport in Bethel, New York, United States
