= 1903 Springfield Training School football team =

American college football season

1903 Springfield Training School football
- Conference: Independent
- Record: 1–3–1
- Head coach: James H. McCurdy (9th season)
- Captain: J. Harry Gray

1903 Eastern college football independents records
	Conf.			Overall
Team	W	L	T	W		L		T
Princeton		–		11	–	0	–	0
Yale		–		11	–	1	–	0
Columbia		–		9	–	1	–	0
Dartmouth		–		9	–	1	–	0
Geneva		–		9	–	1	–	0
Holy Cross		–		8	–	2	–	0
Temple		–		4	–	1	–	0
Washington & Jefferson		–		8	–	2	–	0
Lehigh		–		9	–	2	–	1
Harvard		–		9	–	3	–	0
Penn		–		9	–	3	–	0
Army		–		6	–	2	–	1
Carlisle		–		6	–	2	–	1
Amherst		–		7	–	3	–	0
Lafayette		–		7	–	3	–	0
Cornell		–		6	–	3	–	1
Colgate		–		4	–	2	–	1
Penn State		–		5	–	3	–	0
Swarthmore		–		6	–	4	–	0
Dickinson		–		7	–	5	–	0
Brown		–		5	–	4	–	1
Syracuse		–		5	–	4	–	0
Fordham		–		1	–	1	–	0
Franklin & Marshall		–		5	–	5	–	1
Buffalo		–		4	–	4	–	0
Rutgers		–		4	–	4	–	1
Delaware		–		4	–	4	–	0
Villanova		–		2	–	2	–	0
Bucknell		–		4	–	5	–	0
Vermont		–		4	–	5	–	0
Tufts		–		5	–	8	–	0
Wesleyan		–		3	–	6	–	1
Springfield Training School		–		1	–	3	–	1
NYU		–		2	–	5	–	0
New Hampshire		–		2	–	6	–	1
Pittsburgh College		–		1	–	5	–	1
Western U. Penn.		–		1	–	8	–	1

The 1903 Springfield Training School football team was an American football team that represented the International Young Men's Christian Association Training School—now known as Springfield College–as an independent during the 1903 college football season. Led by ninth-year head coach James H. McCurdy, the team compiled a record of 1–3–1.

== Schedule ==
Date	Opponent	Site	Result	Attendance	Source
October 10	at Yale	Yale Field; New Haven, CT	L 0–22		
October 17	Massachusetts	Springfield, MA	L 0–12		
October 24	Worcester Tech	Springfield, MA	W 10–6		
November 7	at Holy Cross	Holy Cross Field; Worcester, MA	L 5–27	1,000	
November 18	at Brown	Andrews Field; Providence, RI	T 6–6		
