= KNJO =

KNJO may refer to:

- the ICAO code for Millinocket Municipal Airport in Millinocket, Maine, United States
- KAIV, an FM radio station in Thousand Oaks, California, that formerly used the call sign KNJO
