= Princeton Airport =

Princeton Airport may refer to:

- Princeton Aerodrome in Princeton, British Columbia, Canada
- Princeton Airport (New Jersey) near Princeton, New Jersey, United States

== See also ==
- Princeton Municipal Airport (disambiguation)
