= Gillespie Field (disambiguation) =

Gillespie Field may refer to:

- Gillespie Field in El Cajon, California, United States (FAA/IATA: SEE)
  - Gillespie Field station
- Gillespie Field (Maine) in Meddybemps, Maine, United States (FAA: 66B)

== See also ==
- Gillespie County Airport in Fredericksburg, Texas, United States (FAA: T82)
- Gillespie Airport (Tennessee), a former airfield in Nashville, Tennessee, United States
