= Old Airport =

Old Airport may refer to:

- Old Airport (Doha)
- Old Airport, Brunei
- The IATA code for Old Town Municipal Airport and Seaplane Base, Maine.
