= Deblois Flight Strip =

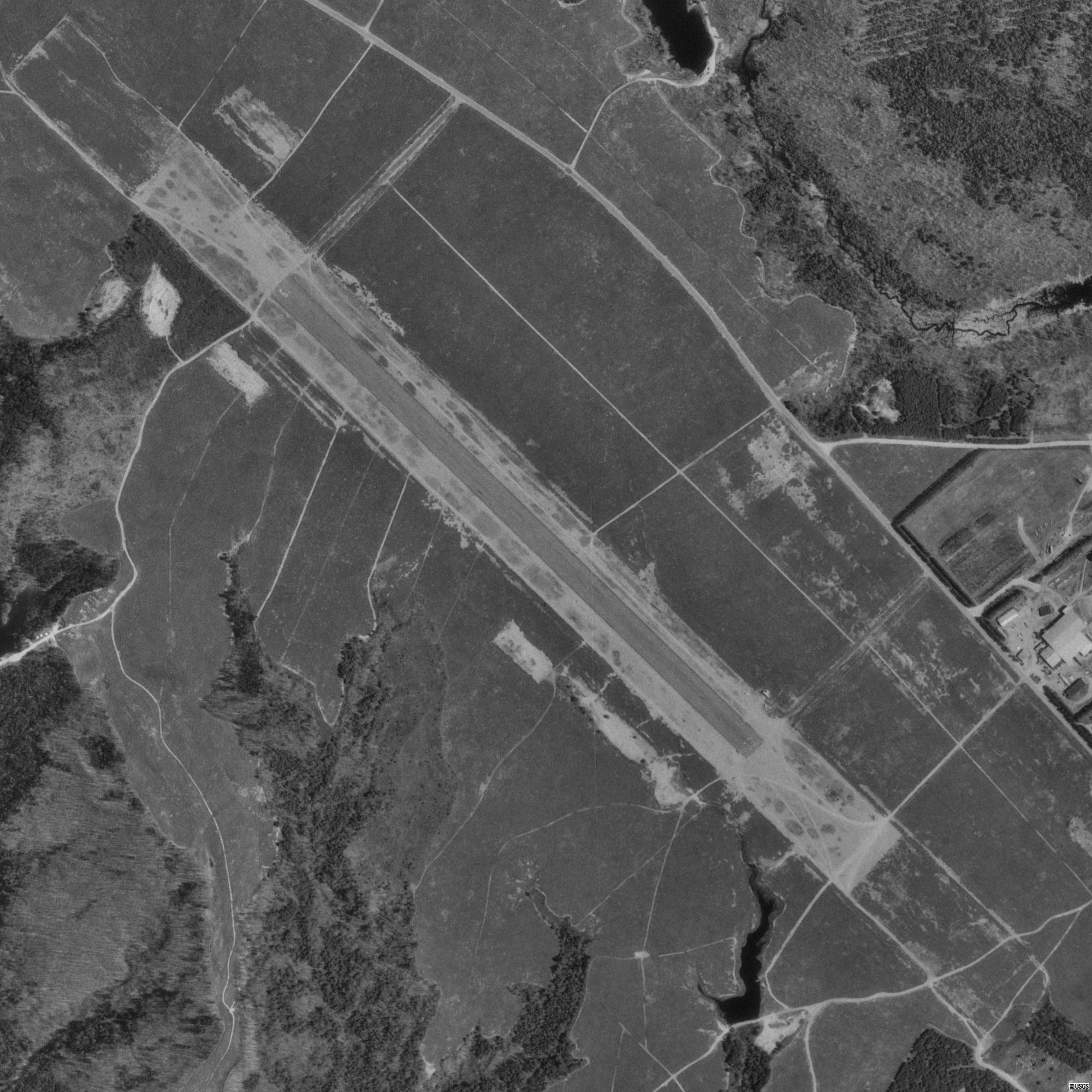
- USGS aerial image, 1996
- IATA: none; ICAO: none; FAA LID: 43B

Summary
- Airport type: Public
- Owner: State of Maine DOT
- Serves: Deblois, Maine
- Elevation AMSL: 217 ft (66 m)
- Coordinates: 44°43′36″N 067°59′23″W
- Interactive map of Deblois Flight Strip

Runways
Direction	Length		Surface
Direction	ft	m	Surface
15/33	3,520	1,073	Asphalt

Statistics (2008)
- Aircraft operations: 100
- Source: Federal Aviation Administration

Deblois Flight Strip (FAA LID: 43B) is a public-use airport located two nautical miles (3.7 km) southeast of the central business district of Deblois, a town in Washington County, Maine, United States. It is currently owned by the Maine Department of Transportation, and managed by Randy Gray, Superintendent of Operations for the Eastern Region.

== History ==
The airport was built by the United States Army Air Forces about 1942 as an emergency landing airfield for military aircraft on training flights. It was closed after World War II, and was turned over for local government use by the War Assets Administration (WAA).

== Facilities and aircraft ==
Deblois Flight Strip covers an area of 153 acres (62 ha) at an elevation of 217 feet (66 m) above mean sea level. It has one runway designated 15/33 with an asphalt surface measuring 3,520 by 75 feet (1,073 x 23 m). For the 12-month period ending August 12, 2008, the airport had 100 general aviation aircraft operations, an average of 8 per month.

== See also ==
- List of airports in Maine
