= Pittsfield Municipal Airport =

Pittsfield Municipal Airport may refer to:

- Pittsfield Municipal Airport (Maine) in Pittsfield, Maine, United States
- Pittsfield Municipal Airport (Massachusetts) in Pittsfield, Massachusetts, United States
