= Limington–Harmon Airport =

Airport in Limington, Maine, USA

- IATA: none; ICAO: none; FAA LID: 63B

Summary
- Airport type: Public
- Owner: Starkweather Airport Authority, LLC
- Operator: Kyle Starkweather
- Serves: Limington, Maine
- Location: Limington, Maine
- Elevation AMSL: 292.3 ft (89.1 m)
- Coordinates: 43°45′47″N 070°40′21″W
- Website: https://www.fly63b.com/
- Interactive map of Limington–Harmon Airport

Runways
Direction	Length		Surface
Direction	ft	m	Surface
11/29	2,973	906	Asphalt

Limington–Harmon Airport (IATA: none; ICAO: none; FAA LID: 63B) is a privately-owned, public-use general aviation airport located 3 miles (2.6 nautical miles; 4.8 kilometers) north of the center of Limington, a town in York County, Maine, United States. It is owned by Starkweather Airport Authority, LLC and managed by Kyle Starkweather, both based in Rochester, New Hampshire.

== Facilities ==
Limington–Harmon Airport is located at an elevation of 292.3 feet (89.1 meters) above mean sea level. It has one asphalt paved runway in poor condition (severely cracked, shallow potholes, and loose aggregate on the runway) designated 11/29 (true alignment of 93° for Runway 11 and 273° for Runway 29), which measures 2,973 feet long by 50 feet wide (906 x 15 meters). The airport has a left traffic pattern, has basic markings in poor condition, and no lights or instrument landing system (ILS). The airport has no air traffic control tower.

== Accidents and incidents ==
- On August 30, 2013, a 56-year-old four-seat Cessna aircraft (built in 1957) crashed while attempting to take off from Runway 29 at around 1:40 PM. Witnesses reported hearing loud noises just before the plane crashed. The pilot and only person on board, 58-year-old Anthony Longley from Naples, was killed in the crash. The crash caused a fuel leak that had to be cleaned up by a hazardous-materials crew.
- On July 12, 2014, a Culver LFA took off at around 4:45 PM headed for Twitchell Airport in Turner. According to witnesses, the plane stalled and crashed into trees. The witnesses reported that they heard the engine sputter and then regain power before the crash, that the aircraft was lower than usual at the end of the runway, and banked sharply to the left and went down after takeoff. The wreckage of the plane was located around 200 yards from the runway. 52-year-old Clarke Tate from Gray, the pilot and only person on board, was killed in the crash.
- On April 14, 2019, a gust of wind caused a small plane to crash after landing. According to officials, the pilot was uninjured.
- On November 16, 2023 at around 12:30 PM, a small yellow plane crashed nose-first into a wooded area less than a mile west of the airport after experiencing an engine failure shortly after takeoff. The pilot and only person on board, 62-year-old Bradley Marston of Windham, survived with only minor injuries and was treated at a local hospital.

== See also ==
- List of airports in Maine
