= Caribou Municipal Airport =

- IATA: CAR; ICAO: KCAR; FAA LID: CAR

Summary
- Airport type: Public
- Operator: City of Caribou
- Location: Caribou, Maine
- Elevation AMSL: 626 ft / 190.8 m
- Coordinates: 46°52′17.4″N 68°01′04.5″W
- Interactive map of Caribou Municipal Airport

Runways
Direction	Length		Surface
Direction	ft	m	Surface
1/19	4,003	1,220	Asphalt
11/29	3,017	920	Asphalt

Caribou Municipal Airport (IATA: CAR, ICAO: KCAR, FAA LID: CAR) is a general aviation airport located 1 mile (2 km) northwest of the city of Caribou in Aroostook County, Maine, USA.

The airport is owned by the city of Caribou and was established in 1929.

== Facilities ==
Caribou Municipal Airport covers 75 acres (300,000 m^{2}) and has two runways:

- Runway 1/19: 4,003 x 100 ft (1,220 x 30 m), Surface: Asphalt
- Runway 11/29: 3,017 x 75 ft (920 x 23 m), Surface: Asphalt

== See also ==
- List of airports in Maine
