= Lincoln Regional Airport (Maine) =

- IATA: none; ICAO: KLRG; FAA LID: LRG

Summary
- Airport type: Public
- Owner: Town of Lincoln
- Serves: Lincoln, Maine
- Elevation AMSL: 208 ft / 63 m
- Coordinates: 45°21′44″N 068°32′05″W
- Interactive map of Lincoln Regional Airport

Runways
Direction	Length		Surface
Direction	ft	m	Surface
17/35	2,804	855	Asphalt
6W/24W	2,400	732	Water

Statistics (2006)
- Aircraft operations: 3,800
- Based aircraft: 34
- Source: Federal Aviation Administration

Lincoln Regional Airport (ICAO: KLRG, FAA LID: LRG) is a public airport located 2 mi (3.2 km) southwest of the central business district of Lincoln, a town in Penobscot County, Maine, United States. It is owned by the Town of Lincoln.

Although most U.S. airports use the same three-letter location identifier for the FAA and IATA, this airport is assigned LRG by the FAA but has no designation from the IATA (which assigned LRG to Lora Lai, Pakistan).

== Facilities and aircraft ==
Lincoln Regional Airport covers an area of 59 acres (24 ha) which contains one asphalt paved runways (17/35) measuring 2,804 x 75 ft (855 x 23 m). It also has one seaplane landing area (6W/24W) measuring 2,400 x 100 ft (732 x 30 m).

For the 12-month period ending July 31, 2006, the airport had 3,800 aircraft operations, an average of 10 per day, 100% of which were general aviation. There are 34 aircraft based at this airport: 91% single engine, 3% multi-engine and 6% ultralight.

== See also ==
- List of airports in Maine
