= Lucky Landing Marina and Seaplane Base =

- IATA: none; ICAO: none; FAA LID: 06B

Summary
- Airport type: Public
- Owner: Timothy D. Hodgkins
- Serves: Bangor, Maine
- Elevation AMSL: 115 ft / 35 m
- Coordinates: 44°54′25″N 068°48′18″W
- Interactive map of Lucky Landing Marina and Seaplane Base

Runways
| Direction | Length | | Surface |
| Direction | ft | m | Surface |
|---|---|---|---|
| 2/20 | 15,000 | 4,572 | Water |

Statistics (2006)
- Aircraft operations: 1,850
- Source: Federal Aviation Administration

Lucky Landing Marina and Seaplane Base (FAA LID: 06B) is a privately owned, public-use seaplane base located seven nautical miles (13 km) north of the central business district of Bangor, a city in Penobscot County, Maine, United States. It is located on Pushaw Lake.

== Facilities and aircraft ==
Lucky Landing Marina and Seaplane Base has one landing area designated 2/20 which measures 15,000 x 4,000 ft (4,572 x 1,219 m). For the 12-month period ending July 31, 2006, the airport had 1,850 aircraft operations, an average of 154 per month: 86% general aviation and 14% air taxi.

== See also ==
- List of airports in Maine
