= Biddeford Municipal Airport =

- IATA: none; ICAO: none; FAA LID: B19

Summary
- Airport type: Public
- Owner: City of Biddeford
- Serves: Biddeford, Maine
- Elevation AMSL: 157 ft (48 m)
- Coordinates: 43°27′50.8″N 070°28′20.6″W
- Interactive map of Biddeford Municipal Airport

Runways
Direction	Length		Surface
Direction	ft	m	Surface
06/24	3,000	914	Asphalt

Statistics (2008)
- Aircraft operations: 23,150
- Based aircraft: 48
- Source: Federal Aviation Administration

Biddeford Municipal Airport (FAA LID: B19) is a public use airport in York County, Maine, United States. It is owned by the City of Biddeford and is located two nautical miles (3.70 km) south of the central business district.

== Facilities and aircraft ==
Biddeford Municipal Airport covers an area of 126 acres (51 ha) at an elevation of 157 feet (48 m) above mean sea level. It has one runway designated 06/24 with an asphalt surface measuring 3,000 by 75 feet (914 x 23 m).

For the 12-month period ending August 19, 2008, the airport had 23,150 aircraft operations, an average of 63 per day: 100% general aviation with a few military. At that time there were 48 aircraft based at this airport: 96% single-engine and 4% multi-engine.

== See also ==
- List of airports in Maine
