= Marsh Island (Maine) =

Island in Penobscot County, Maine, United States

Native name: Wasahpskek Mənəhan
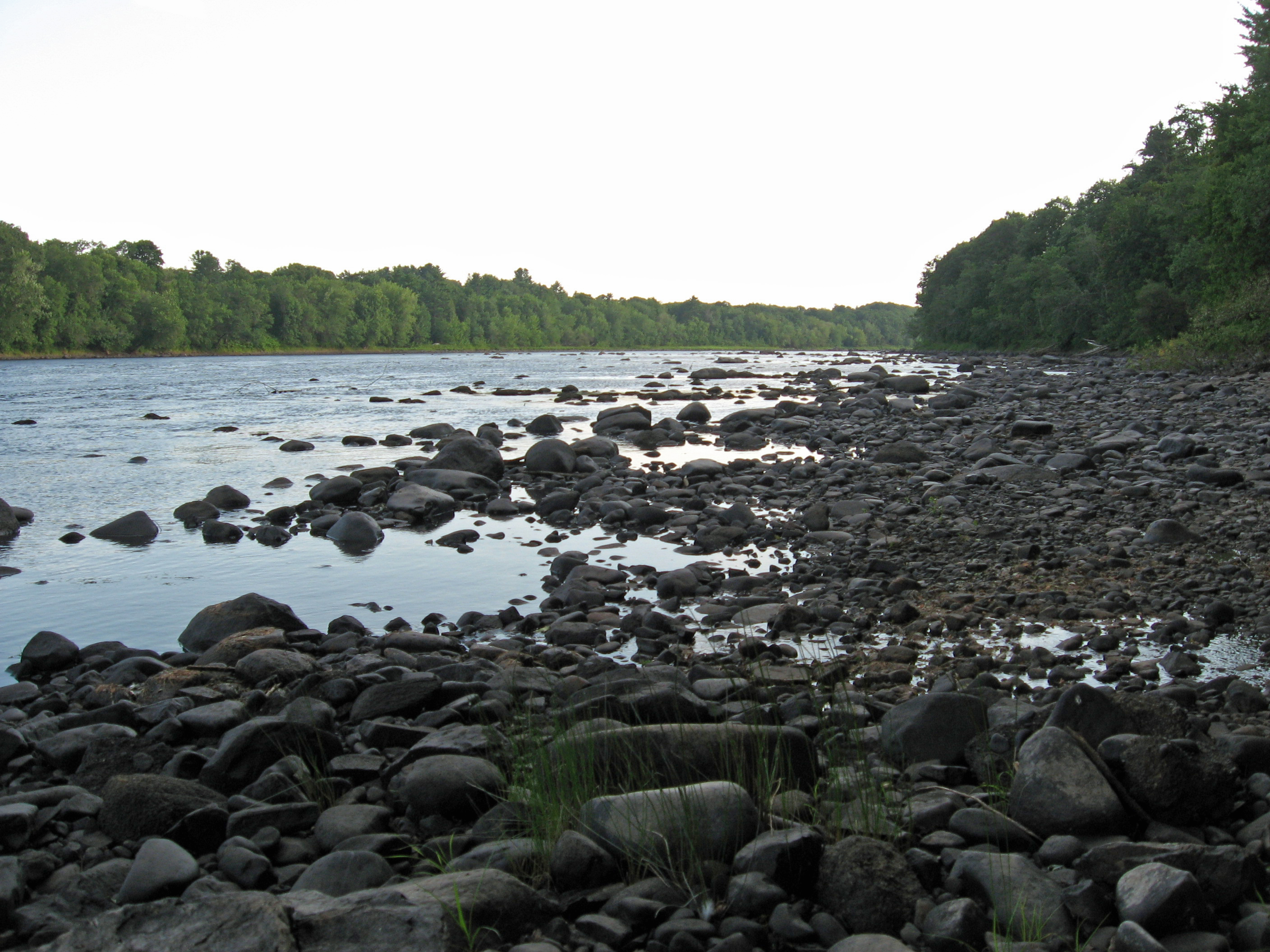
- Penobscot River from Marsh Island

- Location within Maine

Geography
- Coordinates: 44°55′N 68°39′W
- Length: 5.23 mi (8.42 km)
- Width: 2.52 km (1.566 mi)
- Highest elevation: 190 ft (58 m)

Administration
- United States
- State: Maine
- County: Penobscot

Marsh Island (Eastern Abenaki: Wasahpskek Mənəhan) is an island on the Penobscot River in Penobscot County. The Penobscot River borders the eastern side of the island, while the Stillwater River, a side arm of the Penobscot, borders the western side of the island.

== Overview ==
Portions of Old Town and Orono occupy Marsh Island. The University of Maine campus occupies the southwestern corner of the island while Old Town Municipal Airport and Seaplane Base are at the island's northern end. U.S. Route 2 crosses the island and connects Old Town and Orono.

A former Georgia-Pacific paper mill is located on the island in Old Town. In 2011 Marsh Island was opened to bow deer hunting.

== Gallery ==
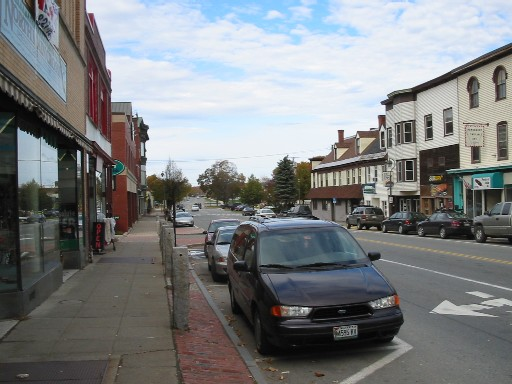
Main Street in Old Town on Marsh Island

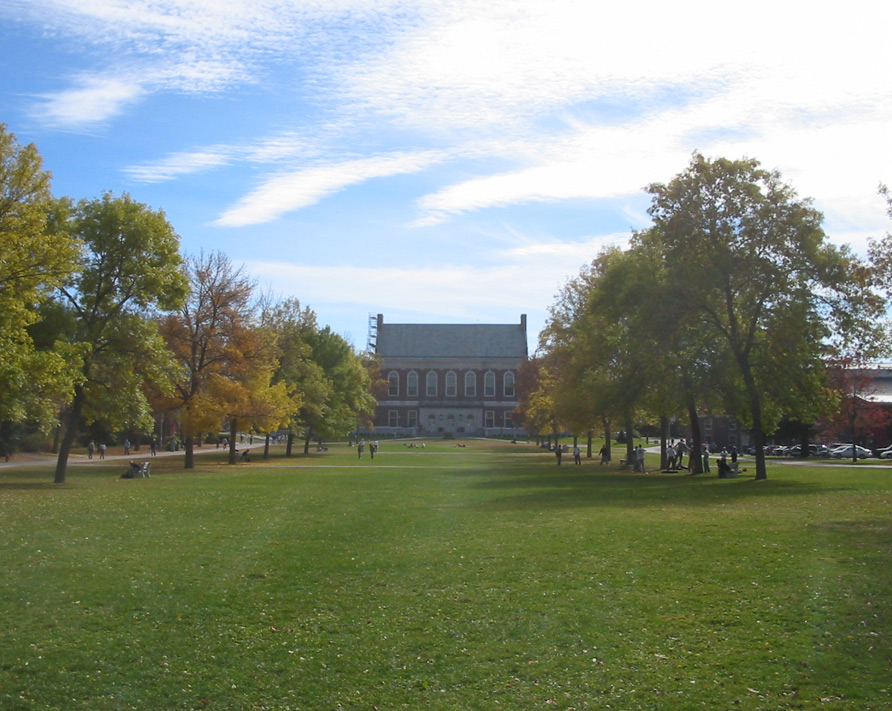
The University of Maine on Marsh Island

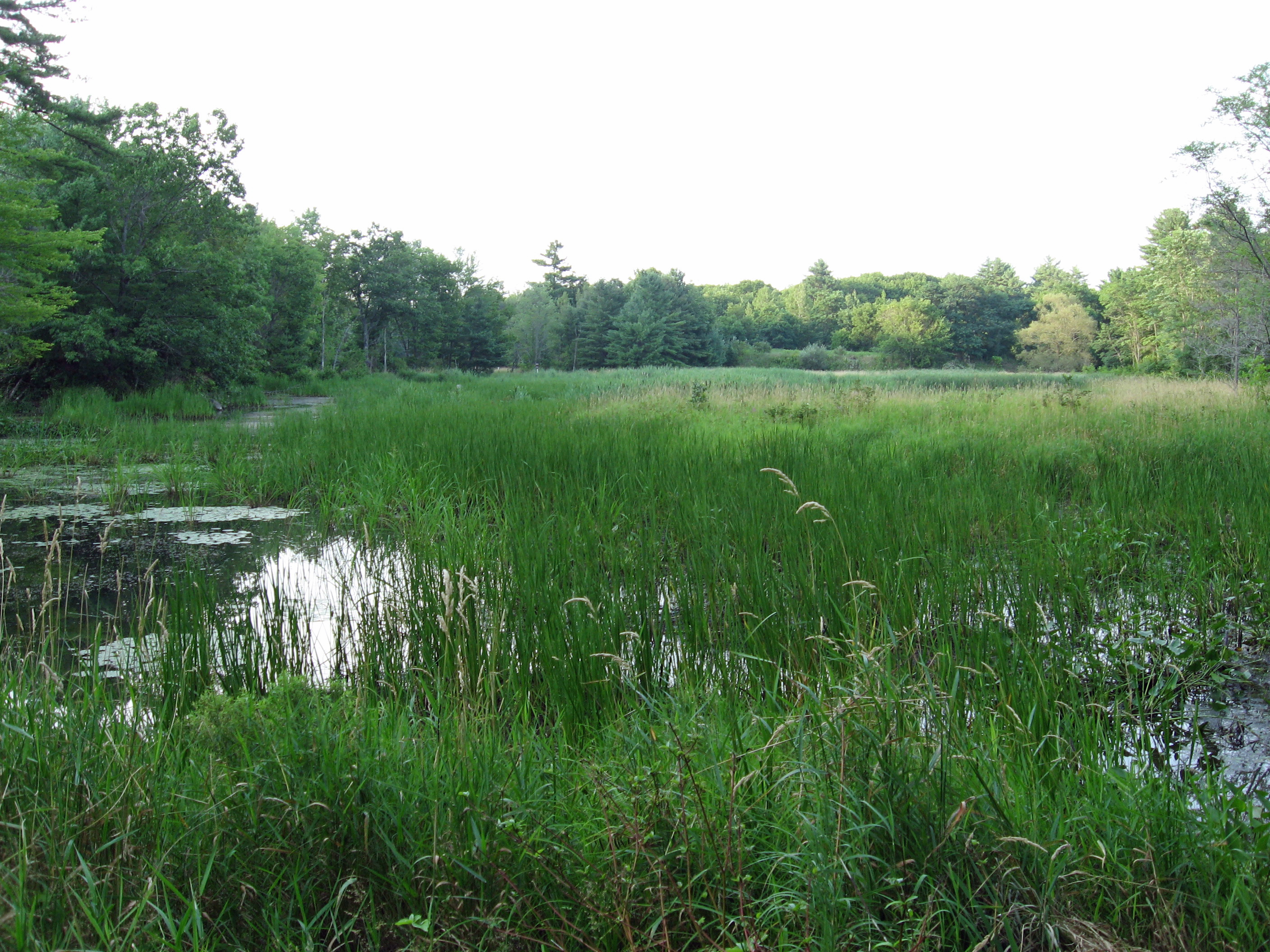
Wetland on Marsh Island

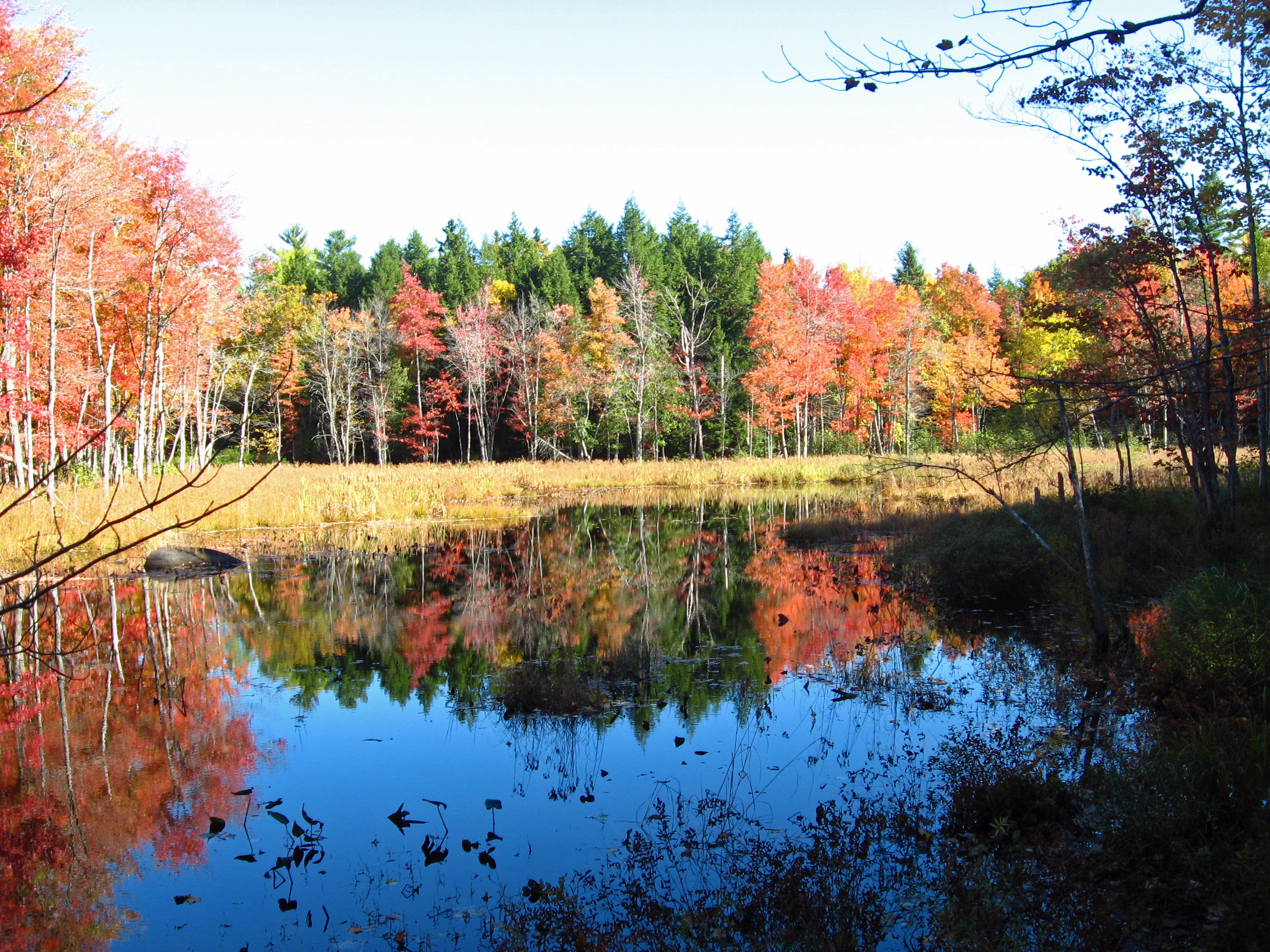
Fall on Marsh Island
