= Millinocket Seaplane Base =

- IATA: none; ICAO: none; FAA LID: 70B

Summary
- Airport type: Public
- Owner: Katadin Air Inc.
- Serves: Millinocket, Maine
- Elevation AMSL: 492 ft / 150 m
- Coordinates: 45°43′42″N 068°50′40″W
- Interactive map of Millinocket Seaplane Base

Runways
| Direction | Length | | Surface |
| Direction | ft | m | Surface |
|---|---|---|---|
| ALL/WAY | 4,000 | 1,219 | Water |

Statistics (2006)
- Aircraft operations: 7,000
- Source: Federal Aviation Administration

Millinocket Seaplane Base (FAA LID: 70B) is a privately owned, public-use seaplane base located on Ambajejus Lake in Piscataquis County, Maine, United States, seven nautical miles (13 km) northwest of the central business district of Millinocket, a town in Penobscot County.

== Facilities and aircraft ==
Millinocket Seaplane Base has one landing area measuring 4,000 x 500 feet (1,219 x 152 m). For the 12-month period ending August 19, 2006, the airport had 7,000 aircraft operations, an average of 19 per day: 60% general aviation, 20% scheduled commercial and 20% air taxi.

== See also ==
- List of airports in Maine
- Millinocket Municipal Airport
