= Oxford County Regional Airport =

- IATA: none; ICAO: none; FAA LID: 81B

Summary
- Airport type: Public
- Owner: Oxford County
- Serves: Oxford, Maine
- Elevation AMSL: 345 ft / 105 m
- Coordinates: 44°09′27″N 070°28′53″W

Map
- Location of airport in Maine 81B (the United States)

Runways
Direction	Length		Surface
Direction	ft	m	Surface
15/33	2,997	913	Asphalt

Statistics (2007)
- Aircraft operations: 34,070
- Based aircraft: 9
- Source: Federal Aviation Administration

Oxford County Regional Airport (FAA LID: 81B) is a county-owned, public-use airport in Oxford County, Maine, United States. It is located two nautical miles (4 km) east of the central business district of Oxford, Maine. This airport is included in the National Plan of Integrated Airport Systems for 2011–2015, which categorized it as a general aviation facility.

== Facilities and aircraft ==
Oxford County Regional Airport covers an area of 70 acres (28 ha) at an elevation of 345 feet (105 m) above mean sea level. It has one runway designated 15/33 with an asphalt surface measuring 2,997 by 75 feet (913 x 23 m).

For the 12-month period ending August 13, 2007, the airport had 34,070 aircraft operations, an average of 93 per day: 99.8% general aviation and 0.2% air taxi. At that time there were 9 aircraft based at this airport: 89% single-engine and 11% multi-engine.

== See also ==
- List of airports in Maine
