= 21B =

21B may refer to:

- 2-1B, a droid character in Star Wars
- Boron-21 (B-21 or ^{21}B), an isotope of boron

== See also ==
- B21 (disambiguation)
