= James H. McCurdy =

American football coach (1866–1940)

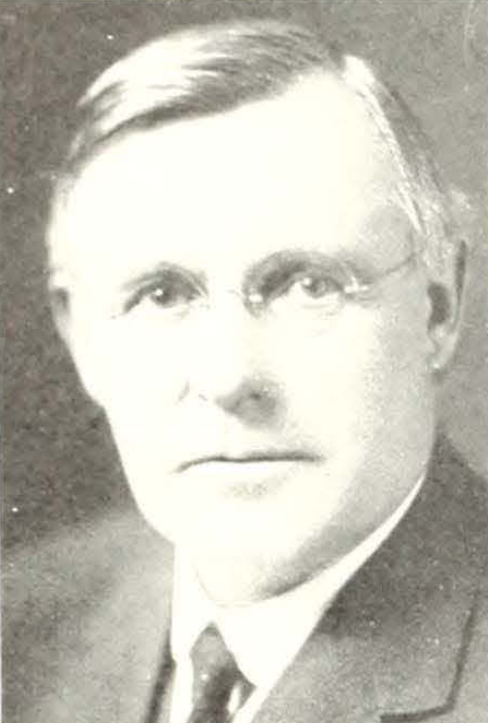
- McCurdy pictured in The Massasoit 1922, Springfield College yearbook

Biographical details
- Born: December 2, 1866; Princeton, Maine, U.S.
- Died: September 4, 1940 (aged 73); Springfield, Massachusetts, U.S.
- Education: NYU (MD, 1893)

Coaching career (HC unless noted)
- 1895–1903: Springfield YMCA
- 1907–1916: Springfield YMCA

Administrative career (AD unless noted)
- 1887–1889: Lewiston YMCA (ME)
- 1890–1895: 23rd Street YMCA (NY)

Head coaching record
- Overall: 69–41–14

James Huff McCurdy (December 2, 1866 – September 4, 1940) was an American football coach. He served as the head football coach at Springfield College (then known as the Springfield YMCA Training School) in Springfield, Massachusetts from 1895 to 1903 and again from 1907 to 1916, compiling a record of 69–41–14.

Dr. McCurdy was elected Fellow #7 in the National Academy of Kinesiology (née American Academy of Physical Education).

Huff was born on December 2, 1866, in Princeton, Maine. He died on September 4, 1940, at Springfield Hospital in Springfield, Massachusetts.
