= Eastport Municipal Airport =

- IATA: none; ICAO: KEPM; FAA LID: EPM

Summary
- Airport type: Public
- Owner: City of Eastport
- Serves: Eastport, Maine
- Elevation AMSL: 45 ft (14 m)
- Coordinates: 44°54′36″N 067°00′46″W

Map
- Location of airport in Maine EPM (the United States)

Runways
Direction	Length		Surface
Direction	ft	m	Surface
14/32	4,002	1,219	Asphalt

Statistics (2008)
- Aircraft operations: 1,200
- Based aircraft: 7
- Source: Federal Aviation Administration

Eastport Municipal Airport (ICAO: KEPM, FAA LID: EPM) is a city-owned public-use airport located one nautical mile (1.85 km) west of the central business district of Eastport, a city in Washington County, Maine, United States.

Although most U.S. airports use the same three-letter location identifier for the FAA and IATA, this airport is assigned EPM by the FAA but has no designation from the IATA.

On October 13, 2020, the airport announced in a ceremony that it had received a $5.2 million grant from the U.S. Federal Aviation Administration. The grant will be used to build a new runway and improve lighting and infrastructure. Expected completion date of the new runway is late 2021. The airport also announced that it will be applying for a federal small airport development grant and that it is in active discussions with Cape Air for future non-stop service to Boston Logan International Airport.

== Facilities and aircraft ==
Eastport Municipal Airport covers an area of 252 acres (102 ha) at an elevation of 45 feet (14 m) above mean sea level. It has one runway designated 15/33 with an asphalt surface measuring 4,000 by 75 feet (1,219 x 23 m).

For the 12-month period ending August 13, 2008, the airport had 1,200 general aviation aircraft operations, an average of 100 per month. At that time there were 5 aircraft based at this airport: 80% single-engine and 20% ultralight.

== See also ==
- List of airports in Maine
