= Ring Hill Airport =

- IATA: none; ICAO: none; FAA LID: 38B

Summary
- Airport type: Public use
- Owner: Charles B. Nute
- Serves: Carmel, Maine
- Elevation AMSL: 340 ft / 104 m
- Coordinates: 44°47′29″N 69°04′18″W

Map
- Location of airport in Maine 38B (the United States)

Runways
Direction	Length		Surface
Direction	ft	m	Surface
16/34	1,100	335	Turf
- Source: Federal Aviation Administration

Ring Hill Airport (FAA LID: 38B) is a privately owned, public use airport in Penobscot County, Maine, United States. It is located one nautical mile (2 km) west of the central business district of Carmel, Maine.

== Facilities ==
Ring Hill Airport covers an area of 8 acres (3 ha) at an elevation of 340 feet (104 m) above mean sea level. It has one runway designated 16/34 with a turf surface measuring 1,100 by 60 feet (335 x 18 m).

== See also ==
- List of airports in Maine
