= Princeton Municipal Airport (Maine) =

- IATA: PNN; ICAO: KPNN; FAA LID: PNN

Summary
- Airport type: Public
- Owner: Town of Princeton
- Serves: Princeton, Maine
- Elevation AMSL: 266 ft / 81 m
- Coordinates: 45°12′02″N 067°33′52″W
- Interactive map of Princeton Municipal Airport

Runways
Direction	Length		Surface
Direction	ft	m	Surface
15/33	4,004	1,220	Asphalt

Statistics (2007)
- Aircraft operations: 2,250
- Based aircraft: 9
- Source: Federal Aviation Administration

Princeton Municipal Airport (IATA: PNN, ICAO: KPNN, FAA LID: PNN) is a town-owned public-use airport located two nautical miles (3.7 km) south of the central business district of Princeton, a town in Washington County, Maine, United States.

== Facilities and aircraft ==
Princeton Municipal Airport covers an area of 420 acres (170 ha) at an elevation of 265 feet (81 m) above mean sea level. It has one runway designated 15/33 with an asphalt surface measuring 4,004 by 100 feet (1,220 x 30 m). A second paved runway designated 06/24 is abandoned.

For the 12-month period ending July 31, 2007, the airport had 2,250 aircraft operations, an average of 187 per month: 98% general aviation and 2% air taxi. At that time there were 9 aircraft based at this airport: 78% single-engine and 22% ultralight.

== See also ==
- List of airports in Maine
