= Brunswick Executive Airport =

Airport in Maine, United States

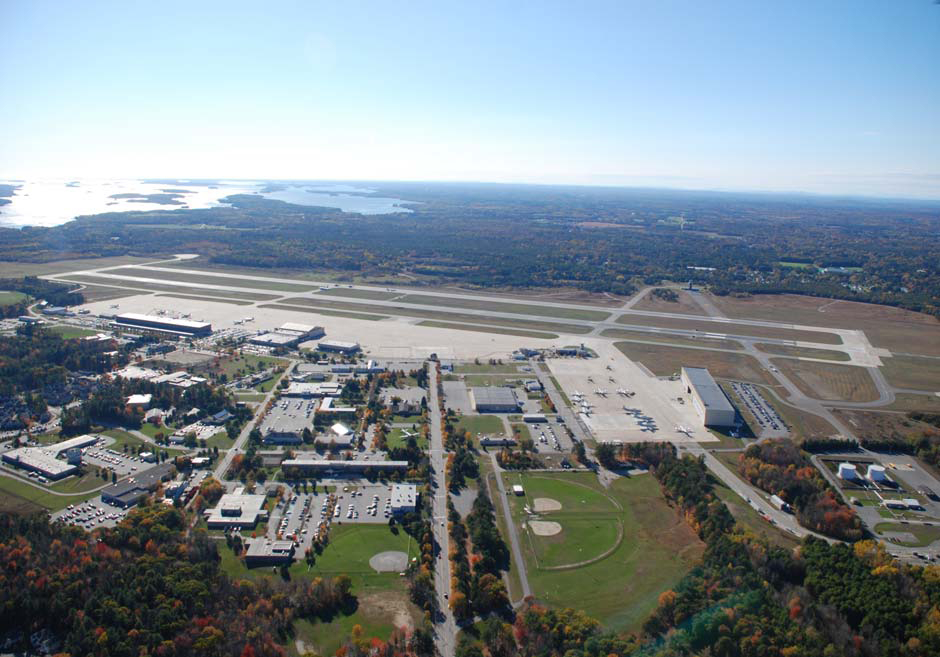
- Looking south, 2009
- IATA: NHZ; ICAO: KBXM; FAA LID: BXM

Summary
- Airport type: Public
- Owner: Midcoast Regional Redevelopment Authority
- Serves: Brunswick, Maine
- Elevation AMSL: 75 ft (23 m)
- Coordinates: 43°53′32″N 069°56′20″W
- Website: www.brunswickexecutiveairport.com
- Interactive map of Brunswick Executive Airport

Runways
Direction	Length		Surface
Direction	ft	m	Surface
1L/19R (Closed)	8,000	2,438	Asphalt
1R/19L	8,000	2,438	Asphalt
- Source: Federal Aviation Administration

Brunswick Executive Airport (IATA: NHZ, ICAO: KBXM, FAA LID: BXM) is a public use general aviation airport located 2 nmi (3.7 km) southeast of the central business district of Brunswick, Maine, United States. It is owned by the Midcoast Regional Redevelopment Authority.

The airport is located on the site of the former Naval Air Station Brunswick. The 2005 Base Realignment and Closure committee recommended the closure of NAS Brunswick, which was opened for civilian aircraft use in June 2011.

The airport is the central focus of Brunswick Landing: Maine's Center for Innovation, a business park.

Although most U.S. airports use the same three-letter location identifier for the FAA and IATA, Brunswick Executive Airport is assigned BXM by the FAA and NHZ by the IATA (which assigned BXM to Batom Airport in Indonesia). The airport's ICAO identifier is KBXM.

== Presidential visits ==
On July 28, 2023, Air Force One landed on the runway with President Joe Biden, for him to then be escorted to Auburn by a V-22 Osprey aircraft.

== Facilities ==
Brunswick Executive Airport covers an area of 920 acres (372 ha) at an elevation of 75 feet (23 m) above mean sea level. It has an asphalt paved runway, 1R/19L, measuring 8,000 by 200 feet (2,438 x 61 m). There is also former runway 1L/19R that is closed and now marked with an X. There also several closed taxiways.

== Environmental issues ==
On August 19, 2024, a malfunctioning fire-suppression system in Hangar 4 discharged 1,600 gallons of aqueous film-forming foam (AFFF) containing toxic PFAS chemicals. The Midcoast Regional Redevelopment Authority had been previously warned of the "tremendous" potential for an accidental discharge due to deficiencies in the fire suppression systems. The incident was the sixth-largest accidental discharge of AFFF in the United States in 30 years.

== See also ==
- List of airports in Maine
