= Machias Valley Airport =

- IATA: none; ICAO: KMVM; FAA LID: MVM

Summary
- Airport type: Public
- Owner: Town of Machias
- Serves: Machias, Maine
- Elevation AMSL: 96 ft / 29 m
- Coordinates: 44°42′11″N 067°28′43″W

Map
- Location of airport in Maine MVM (the United States)

Runways
Direction	Length		Surface
Direction	ft	m	Surface
18/36	2,909	887	Asphalt

Statistics (2011)
- Aircraft operations: 1,600
- Based aircraft: 9
- Source: Federal Aviation Administration

Machias Valley Airport (ICAO: KMVM, FAA LID: MVM) is a town owned, public use airport located one nautical mile (2 km) southwest of the central business district of Machias, a town in Washington County, Maine, United States. It is included in the National Plan of Integrated Airport Systems for 2011–2015, which categorized it as a general aviation facility. The airport was once served by commercial airline service on Northeast Airlines.

Although most U.S. airports use the same three-letter location identifier for the FAA and IATA, this airport is assigned MVM by the FAA but has no designation from the IATA (which assigned MVM to Kayenta Airport in Kayenta, Arizona). The airport's ICAO identifier is KMVM.

== Facilities and aircraft ==
Machias Valley Airport covers an area of 30 acres (12 ha) at an elevation of 96 feet (29 m) above mean sea level. It has one runway designated 18/36 with an asphalt surface measuring 2,909 by 60 feet (887 x 18 m).

For the 12-month period ending August 16, 2011, the airport had 1,600 general aviation aircraft operations, an average of 133 per month. At that time there were 9 aircraft based at this airport, all single-engine.

Instrument Approach Procedure:

- RNAV (GPS) RWY 36

== See also ==
- List of airports in Maine
