= Charles A. Chase Jr. Memorial Field =

Airport in Maine, United States

Charles A. Chase Jr. Memorial Field Airport
- IATA: none; ICAO: none; FAA LID: 44B

Summary
- Airport type: Public
- Owner: Town of Dover-Foxcroft
- Operator: Brian Kelly
- Serves: Dover-Foxcroft
- Location: Maine
- Elevation AMSL: 520 ft (160 m)
- Coordinates: 45°10′38″N 69°14′40″W
- Interactive map of Charles A. Chase Jr. Memorial Field Airport

Runways
Direction	Length		Surface
Direction	ft	m	Surface
9/27	2,926	892	Turf

Statistics (2008)
- Aircraft operations: 696
- Based aircraft: 5
- Source: Federal Aviation Administration

Charles A. Chase Jr. Memorial Field (FAA LID: 44B), is located in Dover-Foxcroft, Maine, United States.

== Facilities and aircraft ==
Charles A. Chase Jr. Memorial Field is situated one mile southwest of the central business district, and contains one runway. The runway, 9/27, is turf measuring 2,926 ft × 75 ft (892 m × 23 m).

For the 12-month period ending August 10, 2008, the airport had 696 aircraft operations, an average of 58 per month: 86% local general aviation, and 14% transient general aviation. At that time there were five aircraft based at this airport: 80% single-engine and 20% ultralight.

== See also ==
- List of airports in Maine
