= Midcoast Regional Redevelopment Authority =

- Company type: Municipal corporation(non-profit)
- Industry: Military base redevelopment
- Founded: 2006
- Founder: Maine State Legislature.
- Headquarters: Brunswick, Maine, United States
- Key people: Kristine Logan, Executive Director
- Number of employees: 10 (as of 2023)
- Website: brunswicklanding.us

The Midcoast Regional Redevelopment Authority (MRRA) is a public municipal corporation created in 2007 by the Maine State Legislature to manage the conversion of the former Naval Air Station Brunswick to civilian use. MRRA is overseen by an 11-member board of trustees appointed by the Governor of Maine and confirmed by the legislature. MRRA is located at the former United States Navy base, now called Brunswick Landing, in Brunswick, Maine. MRRA is responsible for implementation of the Reuse Master Plans. for both the Naval Air Station Brunswick and the former Topsham Annex, located in the town of Topsham, Maine across the Androscoggin River from Brunswick. MRRA also owns and manages the Brunswick Executive Airport.

== Land Transfers ==
MRRA acquires former Navy property through what are known as Economic Development Conveyances (EDC) and Public Benefit Conveyances (PBC). Before land is transferred, it must be cleared of any environmental issues by the Navy, the Maine Department of Environmental Protection and the federal Environmental Protection Agency. Overall, MRRA will receive about 2,100 acres from the Navy when all conveyances are complete. In the case of Brunswick Executive Airport, MRRA was given the property, almost 1,000 acres, via a PBC. With EDCs, MRRA purchases the property from the Navy through a somewhat complex payment schedule that includes a revenue sharing mechanism. As of Nov. 1, 2013, MRRA owns 722.19 acres of 1,098 acres of non-airport property and 992.2 acres of airport property. The Town of Brunswick and Bowdoin College will receive the remaining Navy property.

Under its land transfer agreement with the Navy, MRRA was required to enter into a $3 million loan agreement with the U.S. government for transfer of EDC property. MRRA plans to begin paying off the loan in 2014, although it is not required to pay until 2015.

The Navy Covenant arrangement includes further contingencies for MRRA in that the 25 percent annual share is required for real estate proceeds in excess of $7 million and up to $37,400,000. If proceeds are excess of $37,400,000 and less than $42,400,000, MRRA is not required to pay the government any portion of the proceeds.

If the real estate proceeds exceed $42,400,000, MRRA must pay the government 50 percent of all gross real estate proceeds annually. These requirements will be in effect for 23 years, starting after the initial closing or January 1, 2018, whichever is earlier.

== Redevelopment ==
MRRA has identified five target industry sectors on which to focus its economic development efforts—aviation/aerospace, biotech/biomed, composites and advance materials, information technology, and renewable energy. MRRA has been recognized for its success compared to its 2005 BRAC peers in rapidly repurposing the former Navy base. The authority says it has 25 businesses on the Brunswick Landing campus, including Southern Maine Community College. Other businesses located at Brunswick Landing include Mölnlycke Health Care, Tempus Jets, Kestrel Aviation, American Bureau of Shipping, Oxford Networks, and Providence Service Corporation. Those businesses have created 350 jobs. as of November 1, 2013. MRRA helped host the Association of Defense Communities (ADC) Base Redevelopment Forum September 24 to Sept. 26, 2013 in Portland, Maine. It has been lauded for its accomplishments by both the ADC and the U.S. Department of Defense, Office of Economic Adjustment.

== AFFF (PFAS) Release ==
On August 19, 2024, an accidental release of over 1,400 gallons of PFAS-laden aqueous film-forming foam (AFFF)] took place at the Brunswick Executive Airport at Hangar 4.

The Maine Centers for Disease Control (CDC) has issued "Advisories on Eating Freshwater Fish Due to PFAS Contamination" following the incident.

After the spill, it was reported that MRRA had been previously warned of the "tremendous" potential for an accidental discharge at Hangar 4 due to deficiencies in the fire suppression systems. The Executive Director of MRRA later resigned in October, 2024.

The Town Council of Brunswick, Maine passed a resolution in September, 2024 resolving that MRRA shut off its AFFF fire suppression systems in Hangar 6 due to concerns of another spill that could potentially contaminate the public drinking water supply. MRRA cited its contractual obligations to its tenants at the airport as the reason why the AFFF fire suppression systems would not be immediately shut off.
