= Cutler Regional Airport =

- IATA: none; ICAO: none; FAA LID: ME2

Summary
- Airport type: Public
- Owner: Andrew Patterson
- Serves: Cutler, Maine
- Elevation AMSL: 55 ft (17 m)
- Coordinates: 44°40′48″N 067°15′52″W
- Interactive map of Cutler Regional Airport

Runways
Direction	Length		Surface
Direction	ft	m	Surface
9/27	2,950	899	gravel

Statistics (2010)
- Aircraft operations: 300
- Based aircraft: 4
- Source: Federal Aviation Administration

Cutler Regional Airport (FAA LID: ME2) is a public use airport located two nautical miles (4 km) west of the central business district of Cutler, a town in Washington County, Maine, United States.

== Facilities and aircraft ==
Cutler Regional Airport covers an area of 50 acres (20 ha) at an elevation of 55 feet (17 m) above mean sea level. It has one runway designated 9/27 with a gravel surface measuring 2,950 by 40 feet (899 x 12 m).

For the 12-month period ending August 19, 2010, the airport had 300 general aviation aircraft operations, an average of 25 per month. At that time there were 4 aircraft based at this airport: 50% single-engine, 25% multi-engine, and 25% helicopter.

== See also ==
- List of airports in Maine
