= Islesboro Airport =

- IATA: none; ICAO: none; FAA LID: 57B

Summary
- Airport type: Public
- Owner: Town of Islesboro
- Serves: Islesboro, Maine
- Elevation AMSL: 92 ft (28 m)
- Coordinates: 44°18′09″N 068°54′38″W

Map
- Location of airport in Maine 57B (the United States)

Runways
Direction	Length		Surface
Direction	ft	m	Surface
1/19	2,400	732	Asphalt

Statistics (2008)
- Aircraft operations: 1,144
- Source: Federal Aviation Administration

Islesboro Airport (FAA LID: 57B) is a town owned public use airport located one nautical mile (1.85 km) west of the central business district of Islesboro, a town in Waldo County, Maine, United States. This airport is included in the FAA's National Plan of Integrated Airport Systems for 2009–2013, which categorized it as a general aviation facility.

== Facilities and aircraft ==
Islesboro Airport covers an area of 41 acres (17 ha) at an elevation of 92 feet (28 m) above mean sea level. It has one runway designated 1/19 with an asphalt surface measuring 2,400 by 50 feet (732 x 15 m). For the 12-month period ending August 10, 2008, the airport had 1,144 general aviation aircraft operations, an average of 95 per month.

== See also ==
- List of airports in Maine
