= Central Maine Airport of Norridgewock =

- IATA: OWK; ICAO: KOWK; FAA LID: OWK

Summary
- Airport type: Public
- Owner: Town of Norridgewock
- Serves: Norridgewock, Maine
- Elevation AMSL: 270 ft (82 m)
- Coordinates: 44°42′55.8″N 069°51′59.3″W
- Interactive map of Central Maine Airport of Norridgewock

Runways
Direction	Length		Surface
Direction	ft	m	Surface
03/21	3,999	1,219	Asphalt
15/33	3,999	1,219	Asphalt

Statistics (2006)
- Aircraft operations: 9,824
- Based aircraft: 53
- Source: Federal Aviation Administration

Central Maine Airport of Norridgewock (IATA: OWK, ICAO: KOWK, FAA LID: OWK) is a public use airport in Somerset County, Maine, United States. It is owned by the Town of Norridgewock and is located four nautical miles (7.4 km) west of the central business district.

== Facilities and aircraft ==
Central Maine Airport of Norridgewock covers an area of 426 acres (172 ha) at an elevation of 270 feet (82 m) above mean sea level. It has two asphalt runways designated 03/21 and 15/33, both with surfaces measuring 3,999 by 90 feet (1,219 x 27 m).

For the 12-month period ending July 31, 2006, the airport had 9,824 aircraft operations, an average of 27 per day: 100% general aviation with a few military and ultralights. At that time there were 53 aircraft based at this airport: 84% single-engine, 8% multi-engine and 8% ultralights.

== See also ==
- List of airports in Maine
