= KBTS =

Radio station in Big Spring, Texas

- Big Spring, Texas; United States
- Broadcast area: Big Spring-Snyder, Texas
- Frequency: 94.3 MHz
- Branding: 94.3 The Fuse

Programming
- Format: Hot adult contemporary

Ownership
- Owner: Ryan Media, LLC
- Sister stations: KBST-AM, KBST-FM

History
- First air date: August 14, 1995

Technical information
- Licensing authority: FCC
- Facility ID: 15827
- Class: C3
- ERP: 8,300 watts
- HAAT: 171 meters
- Transmitter coordinates: 32°13′13″N 101°26′25″W

Links
- Public license information: Public file; LMS

KBTS (94.3 FM, "The Fuse") is a radio station licensed to serve Big Spring, Texas, United States. The station is currently owned by Ryan Media, LLC.

KBTS broadcasts a hot adult contemporary music format to the greater Big Spring-Snyder, Texas, area.

The station was assigned the KBTS call sign by the Federal Communications Commission on August 6, 1993.
