= Princeton Municipal Airport =

Princeton Municipal Airport may refer to:

- Princeton Municipal Airport (Maine) in Princeton, Maine, United States (FAA: PNN)
- Princeton Municipal Airport (Minnesota) in Princeton, Minnesota, United States (FAA: PNM)
