= Stonington Municipal Airport =

Airport in Maine, US

- IATA: none; ICAO: none; FAA LID: 93B

Summary
- Airport type: Public
- Operator: Town of Stonington
- Location: Stonington, Maine
- Elevation AMSL: 30 ft / 9.1 m
- Coordinates: 44°10′24″N 68°40′49″W
- Interactive map of Stonington Municipal Airport

Runways
Direction	Length		Surface
Direction	ft	m	Surface
7/25	2,099	640	Asphalt

Stonington Municipal Airport (FAA LID: 93B) is a public airport located one mile (1.6 km) northwest of the central business district (CBD) of Stonington, a town in Hancock County, Maine, USA. The airport covers 12 acres and has one runway. It provides service to private and charter aircraft traffic only. Stonington is located on an island named Deer Isle which is only reachable by automobile via a long, narrow suspension bridge.

== See also ==
- List of airports in Maine
