= Wiscasset Municipal Airport =

- IATA: ISS; ICAO: KIWI; FAA LID: IWI

Summary
- Airport type: Public
- Operator: Town of Wiscasset
- Location: Wiscasset, Maine
- Opened: 1961
- Elevation AMSL: 70 ft / 21 m
- Coordinates: 43°57′41″N 069°42′45″W
- Website: www.wiscassetairport.com

Map
- Location of airport in Maine ISS (the United States)

Runways
Direction	Length		Surface
Direction	ft	m	Surface
7/25	3,397	1,035	Asphalt

Wiscasset Municipal Airport (IATA: ISS, ICAO: KIWI, FAA LID: IWI) is a public-use airport located three miles (5 km) southwest of the central business district of Wiscasset, a town in Lincoln County, Maine, United States. This general aviation airport is publicly owned by Town of Wiscasset. As of 2007 it is not served by commercial aircraft, though scheduled air service was once available on Downeast Airlines.

Although most U.S. airports use the same three-letter location identifier for the FAA and IATA, Wiscasset Airport is assigned IWI by the FAA and ISS by the IATA. The airport's ICAO identifier is KIWI.

== Facilities ==
Wiscasset Municipal Airport covers an area of 196 acres (79 ha) and has one runway:

- Runway 7/25: 3,397 x 75 ft (1,035 x 23 m), Asphalt surface

Land was purchased for the airport in 1957. The airport opened in 1961 with a 2,800 foot runway. In 1968 the runway was length was extended.

On April 27, 2020, the FAA announced an award of $3.2 million to repave runway 7/25.

== See also ==
- List of airports in Maine
