= Belfast Municipal Airport =

- IATA: none; ICAO: KBST; FAA LID: BST

Summary
- Airport type: Public
- Owner: City of Belfast
- Serves: Belfast, Maine
- Elevation AMSL: 198 ft (60 m)
- Coordinates: 44°24′34″N 069°00′43″W
- Interactive map of Belfast Municipal Airport

Runways
| Direction | Length | | Surface |
| Direction | ft | m | Surface |
|---|---|---|---|
| 15/33 | 4,000 | 1,219 | Asphalt |

Statistics (2023)
- Aircraft operations (year ending 12/31/2023)*: 3,200
- Based aircraft: 28
- Source: Federal Aviation Administration

Belfast Municipal Airport (ICAO: KBST, FAA LID: BST) is a public use airport in Waldo County, Maine, United States. It is owned by the City of Belfast and is located one nautical mile (1.85 km) southwest of its central business district.

Although most U.S. airports use the same three-letter location identifier for the FAA and IATA, this airport is assigned BST by the FAA but has no designation from the IATA (which assigned BST to Bost Airport in Lashkar Gah, Afghanistan).

== Facilities and aircraft ==
Belfast Municipal Airport covers an area of 218 acres (88 ha) at an elevation of 198 feet (60 m) above mean sea level. It has one runway designated 15/33 with an asphalt surface measuring 4,000 by 100 feet (1,219 x 30 m).

For the 12-month period ending December 31, 2023*, the airport had 3,200 aircraft operations, an average of 61 per week: 84% general aviation and 16% air taxi. At that time there were 28 aircraft based at this airport: all single-engine.

- Note: Error in FAA data fiscal year.

== See also ==
- List of airports in Maine
