= Bestune B50 =

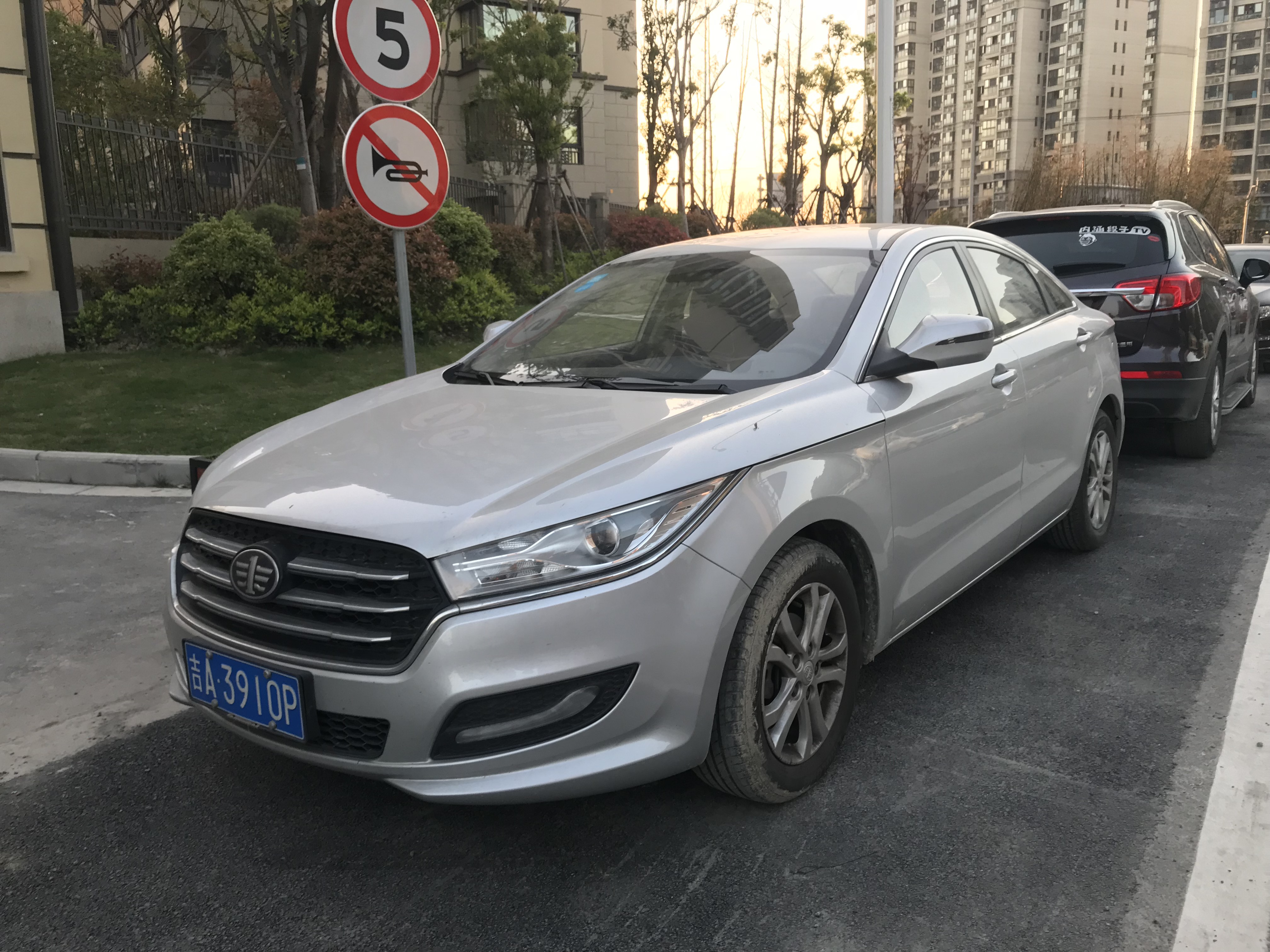
- Bestune B50 II

Overview
- Manufacturer: FAW Group
- Production: 2009–2019

Body and chassis
- Class: Mid-size car (D)

The Bestune B50 (formerly Besturn B50) is a mid-size sedan produced by the Chinese car manufacturer Bestune from 2009 to 2019. Bestune began to sell its vehicles in the Russian market in 2012 with the B50 as the first model to be sold there, which debuted at the 2012 Moscow International Automobile Salon.

== First generation ==
Besturn B50 I
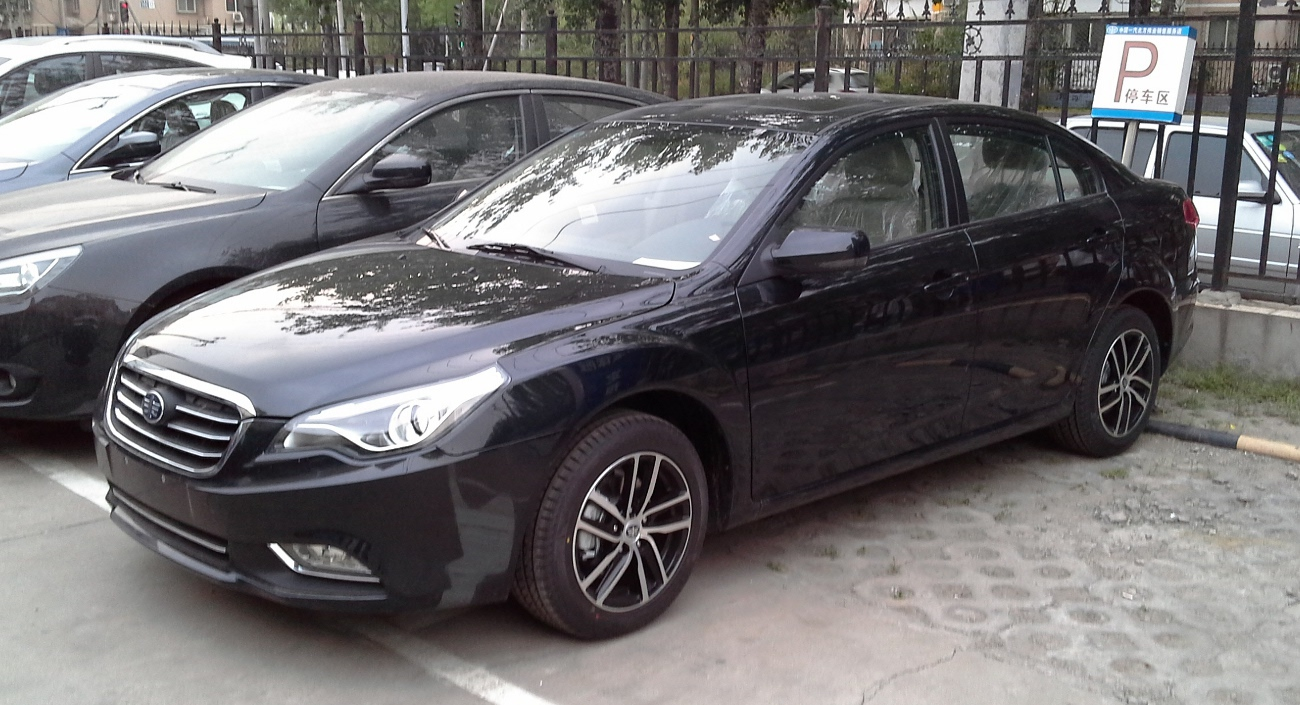
- Besturn B50 Facelift

Overview
- Manufacturer: FAW Group - Besturn
- Also called: B50; Pyeonghwa Hwiparam 1610 (North Korea)
- Production: 2009–2016

Body and chassis
- Class: Mid-size car (D)
- Body style: 4-door sedan
- Layout: Front-engine, front-wheel-drive
- Platform: Ford CD3 platform
- Related: Ford Edge; Ford Fusion; Lincoln MKX; Lincoln MKZ; Mazda6; Mazda8; Mazda CX-9; Mercury Milan

Powertrain
- Engine: 1.6 L BWH I4; 1.8 L ET3 I4
- Transmission: 5-speed manual; 6-speed automatic

Dimensions
- Wheelbase: 2,675 mm (105 in)
- Length: 4,600–4,615 mm (181–182 in)
- Width: 1,785 mm (70 in)
- Height: 1,435 mm (56 in)

Chronology
- Successor: Besturn B50 II

The first generation Besturn B50 was designed by Italdesign Giugiaro, and based on the old Mazda 6 that is still in production at the FAW-Mazda joint venture, and the 1.6-liter engine comes from the Volkswagen Bora made by the FAW-Volkswagen joint venture. It is powered by a naturally aspirated 1.6-liter I4 engine. In 2013, with 62,342 sales, the B50 was the most popular model in the Besturn range, and in the year 2014, 72,259 units were sold. The transmission is manufactured by Aisin Seiki.

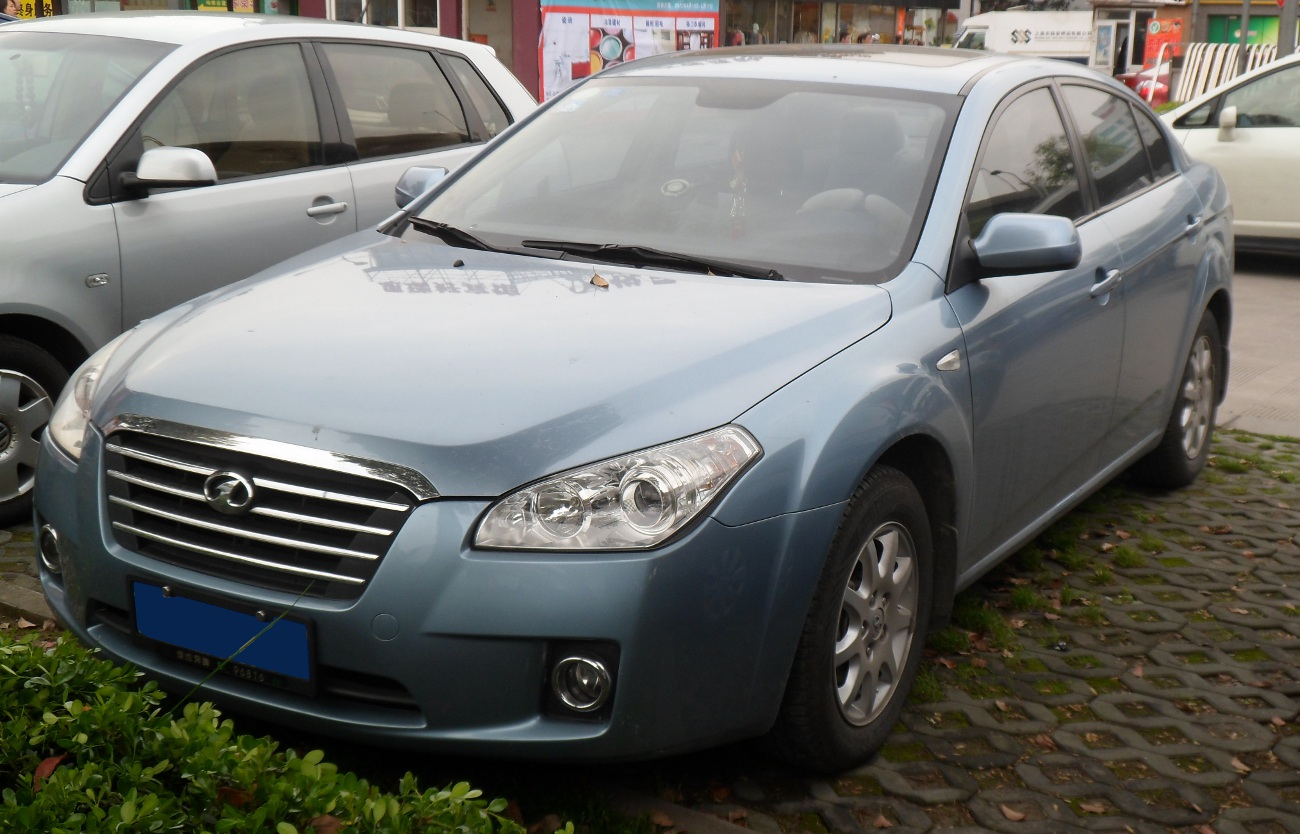
Besturn B50 pre-facelift front.

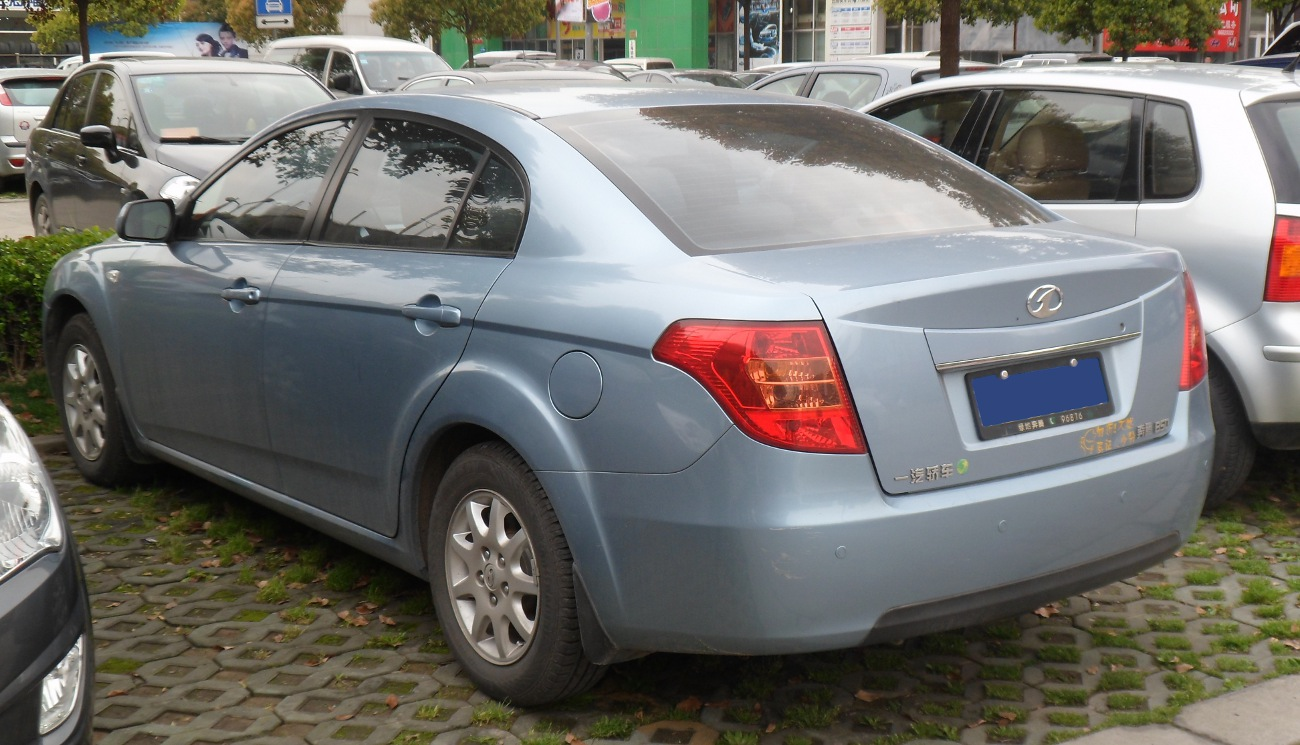
Besturn B50 pre-facelift rear.

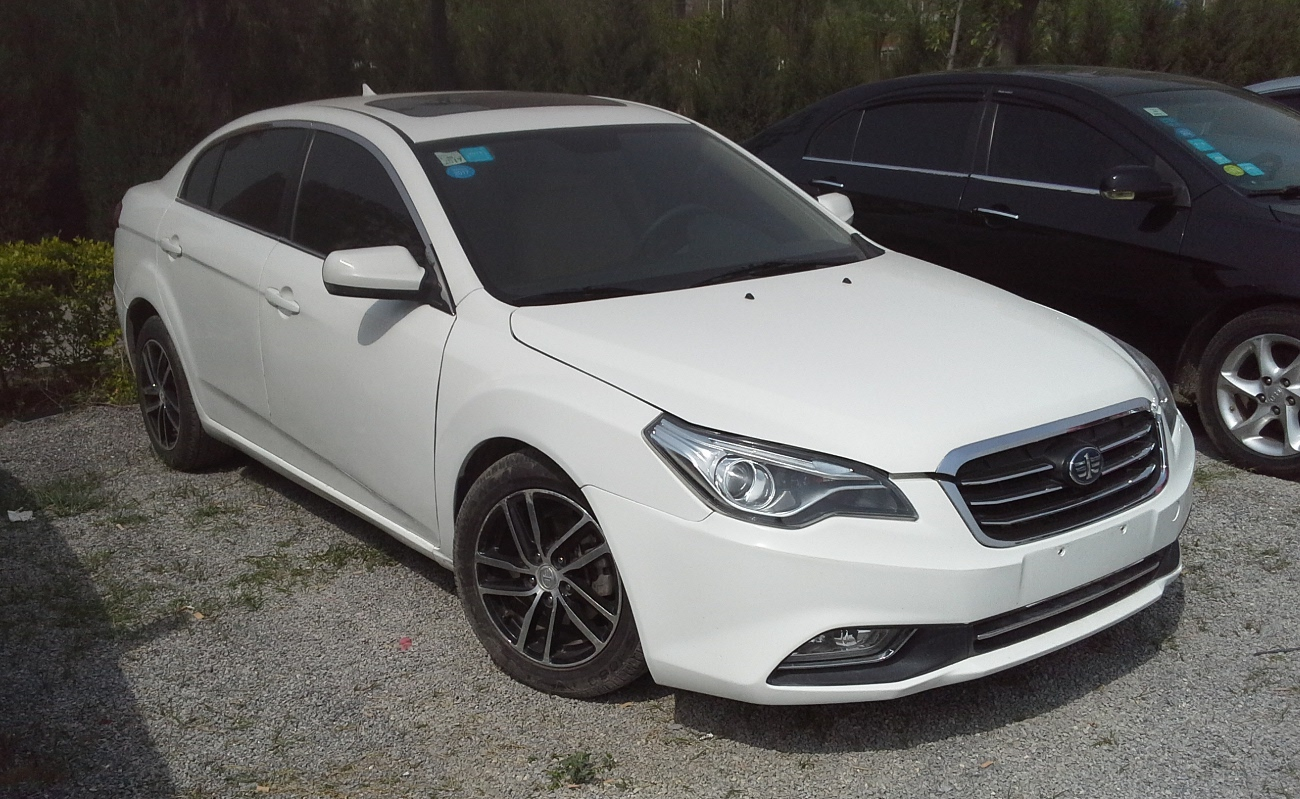
Besturn B50 post-facelift front.

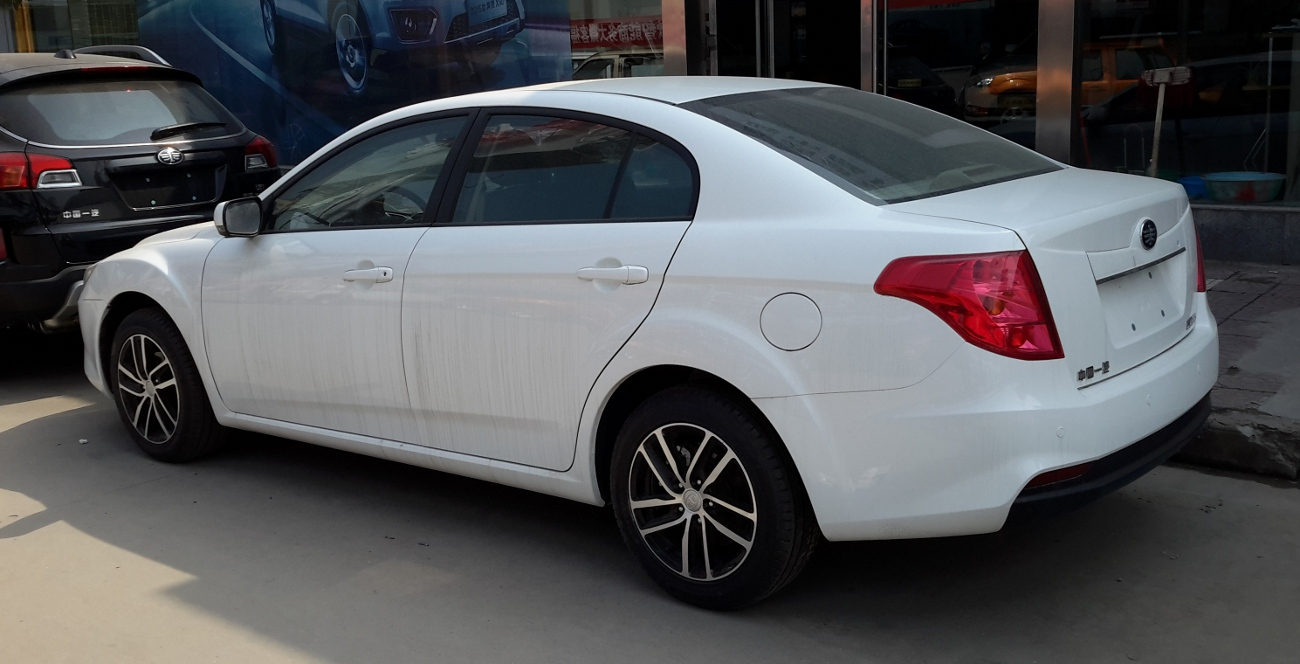
Besturn B50 post-facelift rear.

=== Safety ===
The B50 received a 4-star crash test rating from C-NCAP.

== Second generation ==
Besturn B50 II
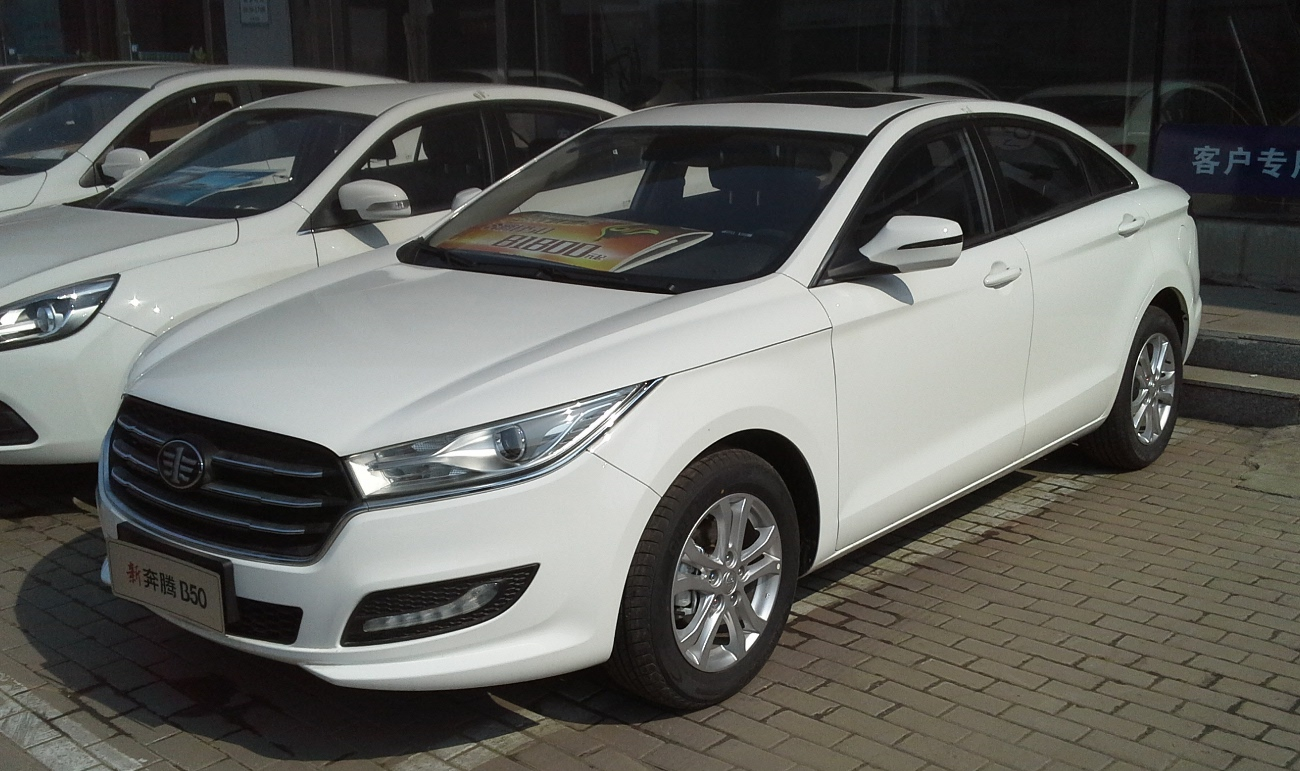
- Besturn B50 Second Generation

Overview
- Manufacturer: FAW Group - Besturn
- Production: 2016–2019

Body and chassis
- Class: Mid-size car (D)
- Body style: 4-door sedan
- Layout: Front-engine, front-wheel-drive

Powertrain
- Engine: 1.4 L CA4GB14TD I4; 1.6 L CA4GB16 I4
- Transmission: 5-speed manual; 6-speed automatic

Dimensions
- Wheelbase: 2,725 mm (107 in)
- Length: 4,695 mm (185 in)
- Width: 1,795 mm (71 in)
- Height: 1,460 mm (57 in)

Chronology
- Predecessor: Besturn B50 I

The second generation Besturn B50 was launched on the Chinese car market in mid-2016. Prices range from 81,800 yuan to 117,800 yuan. The second generation Besturn B50 is also available in an RS sport version. The RS has a black grille with red trim, a tinted roof, an extra spoiler on the trunk lid, RS badges, and a slightly different interior.

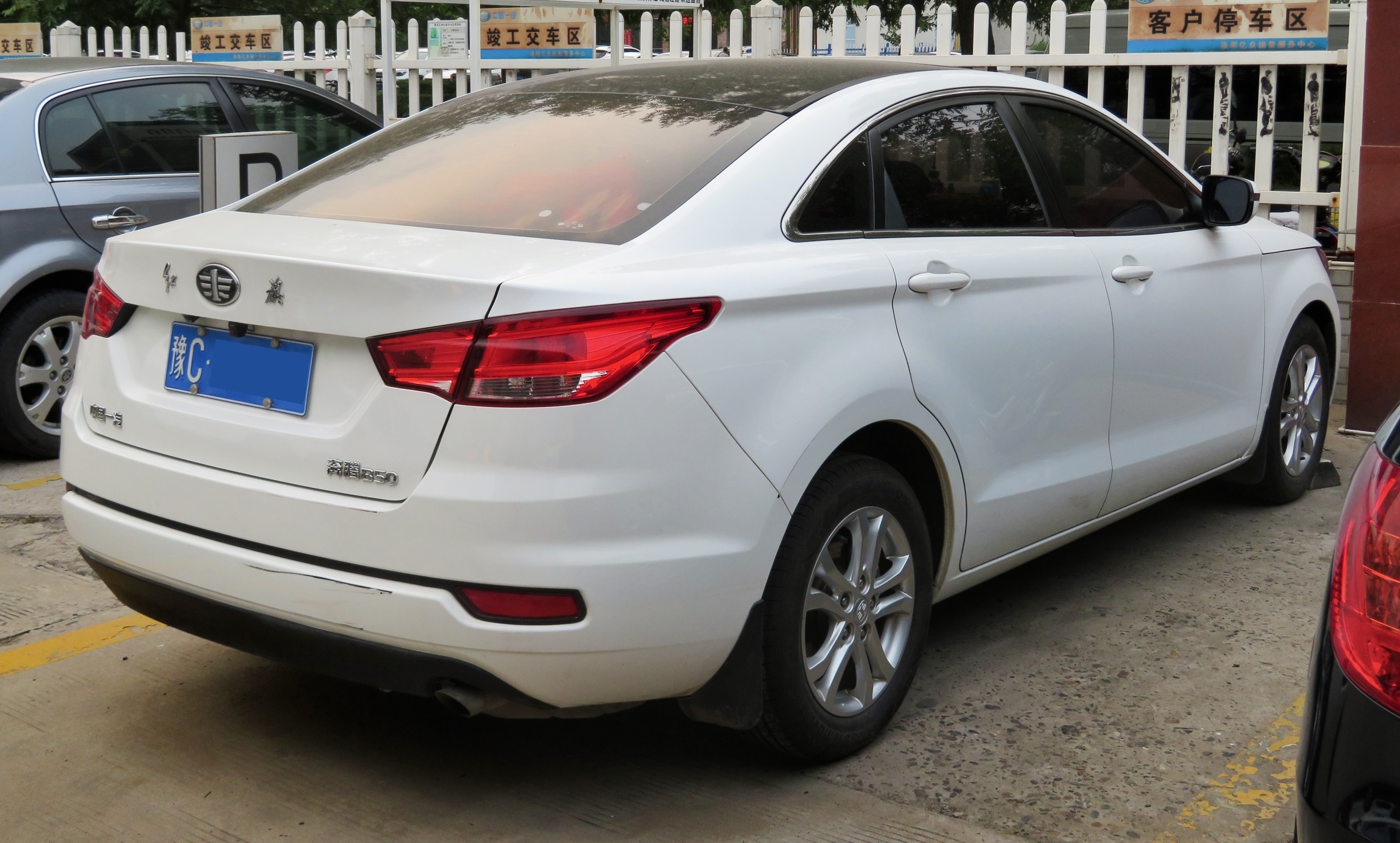
Besturn B50 II rear.

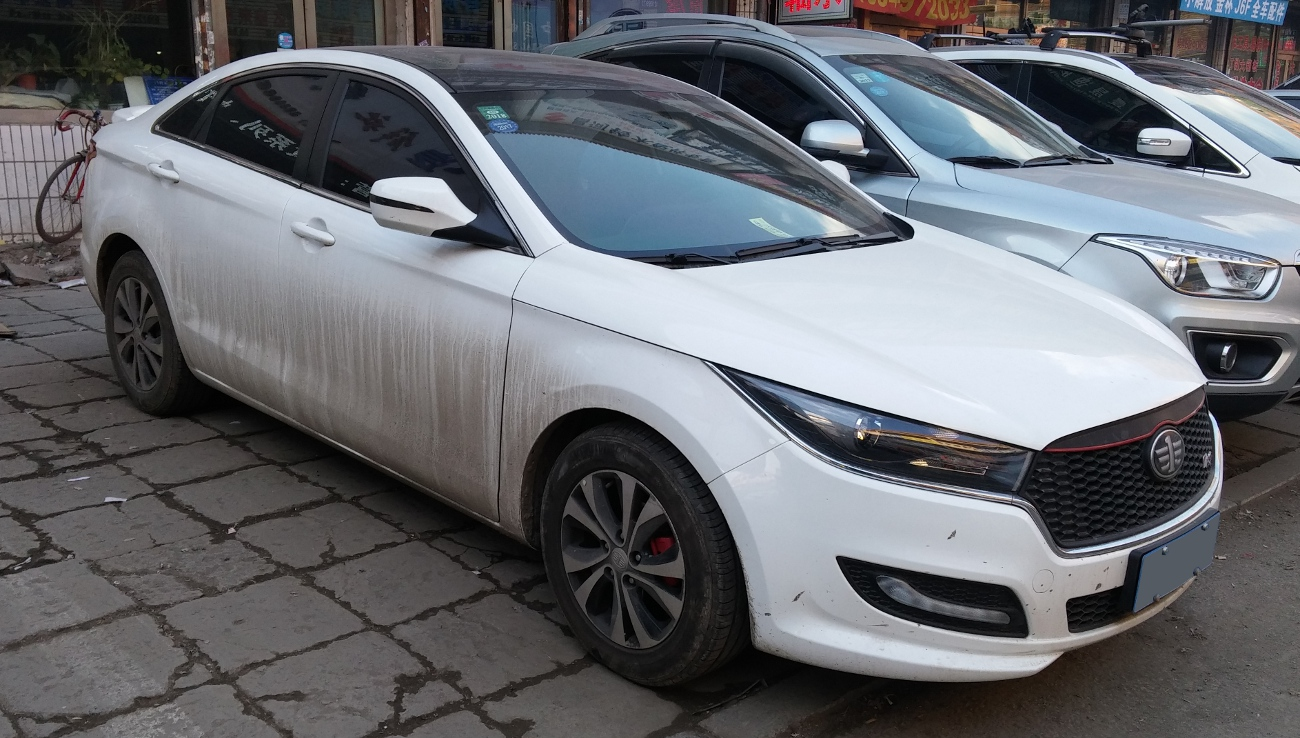
Besturn B50 II RS front.
