= Twitchell Airport =

- IATA: none; ICAO: none; FAA LID: 3B5

Summary
- Airport type: Public
- Operator: Dirigo Aerospace Solutions, LLC (FBO)
- Location: Turner, Maine
- Elevation AMSL: 356 ft / 108.5 m
- Coordinates: 44°11′20.200″N 70°13′58.30″W
- Interactive map of Twitchell Airport

Runways
| Direction | Length | | Surface |
| Direction | ft | m | Surface |
|---|---|---|---|
| 12/30 | 2,104 | 641 | Asphalt |
| 11/29 | 2,151 | 656 | Turf |
| 4W/22W | 10,000 | 3,048 | Water |
| 15W/33W | 5,000 | 1,524 | Water |

Twitchell Airport (FAA LID: 3B5) (aka Twitchell's Airport/Seaplane Base) in Turner, Maine, United States, was a public, privately owned airport. It had one asphalt runway, one turf, and Androscoggin River access for water landings. It averaged 98 flights per day, and had approximately 73 aircraft based on its field.

Twitchell Airport had a fixed-base operator (FBO), Dirigo Aerospace Solutions, LLC. It offered major and minor maintenance jobs, fleet maintenance, fuel, hangar space for rent, and a Skyhawk for rent. DAS also supported seaplane operations with 100LL at the seaplane dock and all seaplane maintenance needs.

Twitchell Airport closed November 2022.

== See also ==
- List of airports in Maine
