= Bethel Regional Airport =

- IATA: none; ICAO: none; FAA LID: 0B1

Summary
- Airport type: Public
- Owner: Town of Bethel
- Location: Bethel, Maine
- Elevation AMSL: 654 ft (199 m)
- Coordinates: 44°25′31″N 070°48′36″W
- Interactive map of Bethel Regional Airport

Runways
Direction	Length		Surface
Direction	ft	m	Surface
14/32	3,818	1,164	Asphalt

Statistics (2006)
- Aircraft operations: 4,520
- Based aircraft: 13
- Source: Federal Aviation Administration

Bethel Regional Airport (FAA LID: 0B1) is a public airport located two miles (3 km) northwest of the central business district of Bethel, a town in Oxford County, Maine, United States. It is owned by the Town of Bethel.

The airport is currently not served by any commercial airline, though on-demand service is available through local charter operators. A free shuttle runs between the town of Bethel and Sunday River ski resort, stopping at the airport on-demand and for occasional scheduled stops.

== Facilities and aircraft ==
Bethel Regional Airport covers an area of 225 acres (91 ha) which contains one asphalt paved runway (14/32) measuring 3,818 x 75 ft (1,164 x 23 m).

For the 12-month period ending August 26, 2006, the airport had 4,520 aircraft operations, an average of 12 per day: 99.6% general aviation and 0.4% military. There are 13 aircraft based at this airport: 77% single-engine, 15% ultralight and 8% multi-engine.

== See also ==
- List of airports in Maine
