= KBST-FM =

- Big Spring, Texas; United States
- Frequency: 95.7 MHz
- Branding: K-Best 95.7

Programming
- Format: Country

Ownership
- Owner: Ryan Media, LLC
- Sister stations: KBST, KBTS

History
- First air date: 1961
- Former call signs: KWKI, KWKI-FM
- Call sign meaning: Big Spring, Texas

Technical information
- Licensing authority: FCC
- Facility ID: 33685
- Class: C2
- ERP: 33,000 watts
- HAAT: 140 meters (460 ft)
- Transmitter coordinates: 32°13′13″N 101°26′25″W

Links
- Public license information: Public file; LMS

KBST-FM (95.7 FM, "K-Best 95.7") is a radio station licensed to serve Big Spring, Texas. The station is owned by Kbest Media, LLC. It airs a new country music format.

The station was assigned the KBST-FM call letters by the Federal Communications Commission on March 17, 1989.

The station began in 1961 as independently owned KFNE (K-Fine) on 95.3 MHz. The studios and transmitter were in a downtown building. Longtime Texas broadcaster John B. Walton, Jr. had a one-third ownership interest in the 1960s until the station was sold to crosstown 1270 KHEM (AM) (now deleted). The transmitter was moved to the nearby hill above Big Spring.
