= Old Town Municipal Airport and Seaplane Base =

Old Town Municipal Airport Dewitt Field
- IATA: OLD; ICAO: KOLD; FAA LID: OLD

Summary
- Airport type: Public
- Owner: City of Old Town
- Serves: Old Town, Maine
- Elevation AMSL: 126 ft / 38 m
- Coordinates: 44°57′09″N 068°40′28″W
- Interactive map of Old Town Municipal Airport

Runways
Direction	Length		Surface
Direction	ft	m	Surface
4/22	3,199	975	Asphalt
12/30	3,999	1,219	Asphalt
17W/35W	8,400	2,560	Water

Statistics (2006)
- Aircraft operations: 47,160
- Based aircraft: 51
- Source: Federal Aviation Administration

Old Town Municipal Airport and Seaplane Base (IATA: OLD, ICAO: KOLD, FAA LID: OLD), also known as Dewitt Field, is a public use airport located two nautical miles (4 km) northwest of the central business district of Old Town, in Penobscot County, Maine, United States. It is owned by the City of Old Town. The seaplane base is located on Marsh Island on the Penobscot River.

== Facilities and aircraft ==
Dewitt Field covers an area of 360 acres (150 ha) at an elevation of 126 feet (38 m) above mean sea level. It has two asphalt paved runways: 12/30 measuring 3,999 x 100 ft (1,219 x 30 m) and 4/22 measuring: 3,199 x 75 ft (975 x 23 m). It also has one seaplane landing area (17W/35W) measuring 8,400 x 100 ft (2,560 x 30 m).

For the 12-month period ending July 31, 2006, the airport had 47,160 aircraft operations, an average of 129 per day: 99% general aviation and 1% military. At that time there were 51 aircraft based at this airport: 80% single-engine, 8% multi-engine, 10% helicopter and 2% ultralight.

== See also ==
- List of airports in Maine
