= HLA-B50 =

Human leukocyte antigen serotype

major histocompatibility complex (human), class I, B50
Alleles	B*5001, B*5002,
Structure (See HLA-B)
Symbol(s)	HLA-B
EBI-HLA	B*5001
EBI-HLA	B*5002
Locus	chr.6 6p21.31

HLA-B50 (B50) is an HLA-B serotype. B50 is a split antigen from the B21 broad antigen, the sister serotype B49. The serotype identifies the more common HLA-B*50 gene products. (For terminology help see: HLA-serotype tutorial)

== Serotype ==
B50 and B21 serotype recognition of some more common HLA B*50 alleles
B*50	B50	B21	Sample
allele	%	%	size (N)
5001	85	3	1700

The B*5002 by serotype definition is a B45 serotype.

== Allele distribution ==
HLA B*5001 frequencies
		freq
ref.	Population	(%)
	Saudi Arabia Guraiat and Hail	17.3
	Tunisia	10.0
	Israel Arab Druse	8.5
	Morocco Nador Metalsa (Berber)	7.3
	Tunisia Tunis	6.3
	Israel Ashkenazi and Non Ashkenazi Jews	5.5
	Azores Terceira Island	5.1
	Georgia Svaneti Svans	3.8
	India North Delhi	3.8
	Italy Bergamo	3.6
	Georgia Tbilisi Kurds	3.4
	Italy North (1)	3.3
	Brazil Belo Horizonte	3.2
	Madeira	3.2
	Italy North Pavia	3.1
	Portugal South	3.1
	Oman	3.0
	Georgia Tbilisi Georgians	2.8
	Bulgaria	2.7
	Azores Santa Maria and Sao Miguel	2.6
	Spain Eastern Andalusia Gipsy	2.5
	Sudanese	2.5
	Czech Republic	2.4
	Spain Eastern Andalusia	2.4
	Spain Mallorca and Menorca	2.2
	Burkina Faso Fulani	2.0
	China Inner Mongolia	2.0
	China North Han	1.9
	India North Hindus	1.9
	China Qinghai Hui	1.8
	Jordan Amman	1.7
	Russia Tuva (2)	1.7
	Spain Catalonia Girona	1.7
	Senegal Niokholo Mandenka	1.6
	Guinea Bissau	1.5
	India New Delhi	1.5
	Croatia	1.3
	Cuban Mulatto	1.2
	France South East	1.2
	Burkina Faso Rimaibe	1.1
	Mali Bandiagara	1.1
	Belgium	1.0
	Ireland Northern	1.0
	Ireland South	1.0
	Italy Sardinia pop3	1.0
	South Africa Natal Tamil	1.0
	B*5002
	Morocco Nador Metalsa (Berber)	4.3
	Portugal North	1.1
	Portugal South	1.0
	Madeira	0.8
	Tunisia Tunis	0.6
