= HLA-B21 =

Human leukocyte antigen serotype

HLA-B21 (B21) is an HLA - B serotype. B21 is a broad antigen serotype that recognizes the B49 and B50 split antigen serotypes.
