= Gillespie Field (Maine) =

Airport in Maine, United States

- IATA: none; ICAO: none; FAA LID: 66B

Summary
- Airport type: Public use
- Owner: Bruce Bailey
- Serves: Meddybemps, Maine
- Elevation AMSL: 200 ft (61 m)
- Coordinates: 45°02′00″N 067°20′58″W

Map
- Location of airport in Maine 66B (the United States)

Runways
| Direction | Length | | Surface |
| Direction | ft | m | Surface |
|---|---|---|---|
| 16/34 | 1,635 | 498 | Turf |

Statistics (2010)
- Aircraft operations: 700
- Source: Federal Aviation Administration

Gillespie Field (FAA LID: 66B) is a public use airport located one nautical mile (2 km) west of the central business district of Meddybemps, a town in Washington County, Maine, United States.

== Facilities and aircraft ==
Gillespie Field covers an area of 60 acres (24 ha) at an elevation of 200 feet (61 m) above mean sea level. It has one runway designated 16/34 with a turf surface measuring 1,635 by 50 feet (498 x 15 m). For the 12-month period ending August 19, 2010, the airport had 700 general aviation aircraft operations, an average of 58 per month.

== See also ==
- List of airports in Maine
