= KBST (AM) =

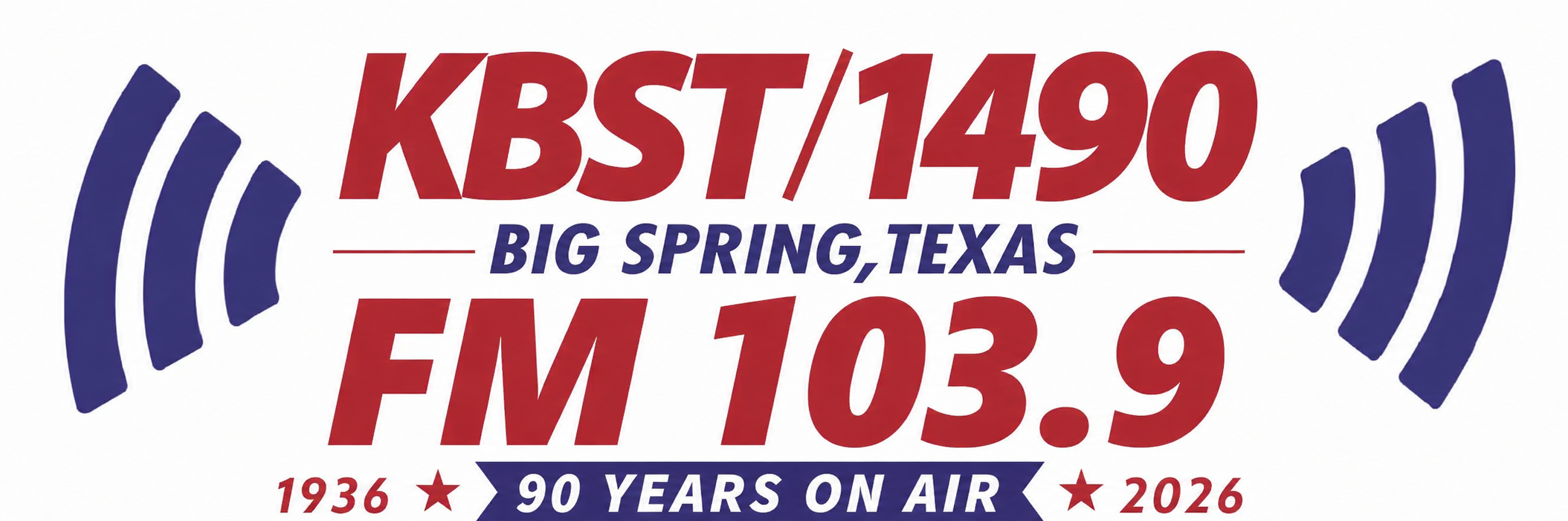
- Big Spring, Texas; United States
- Broadcast area: Big Spring-Snyder
- Frequency: 1490 kHz
- Branding: 103.9 FM & 1490 KBST AM

Programming
- Format: Talk radio
- Affiliations: ABC News Radio; Compass Media Networks; Fox Sports Radio; Premiere Networks; Westwood One

Ownership
- Owner: Ryan Media, LLC
- Sister stations: KBTS, KBST-FM

History
- First air date: December 21, 1936
- Call sign meaning: Big Spring, Texas

Technical information
- Licensing authority: FCC
- Facility ID: 33684
- Class: C
- Power: 1,000 watts (unlimited)
- Transmitter coordinates: 32°15′44″N 101°27′37″W
- Translator: 103.9 K280GW (Big Spring)

Links
- Public license information: Public file; LMS
- Webcast: Listen live
- Website: Official website

Logo before translator sign on

KBST (1490 AM) is a radio station broadcasting a talk format. Licensed to Big Spring, Texas, United States, the station serves the Big Spring-Snyder area. The station is currently owned by Ryan Media, LLC, and includes programming from ABC News Radio, Fox Sports Radio, Compass Media Networks, Premiere Networks, and Westwood One.

KBST signed on in 1936. It was an early affiliate of the Texas State Network (1938). The station was co-owned with the Big Spring Herald for many years, and was spun off in 1959 to "The Snyder Corporation" owned by Ted Snider and Winston Wrinkle.

KBST began as a 100-watt full-time operation. It raised day power to 250 watts in 1959, 1,000 watts days in 1964, and 1,000 watts at nights in 1984. It broadcast in AM stereo, using the C-QUAM system, in 1985.
