= HLA-B49 =

Human leukocyte antigen serotype

major histocompatibility complex (human), class I, B49
Alleles	B*4901, B*4902, B*4903
Structure (See HLA-B)
Symbol(s)	HLA-B
EBI-HLA	B*4901
EBI-HLA	B*4902
EBI-HLA	B*4903
Locus	chr.6 6p21.31

HLA-B49 (B49) is an HLA-B serotype. B49 is a split antigen from the B21 broad antigen, the sister serotype B50. The serotype identifies the more common HLA-B*50 gene products. (For terminology help see: HLA-serotype tutorial)

== Serotype ==
B49 and B21 serotype recognition of some more common HLA B*49 alleles
B*49	B49	B21	Sample
allele	%	%	size (N)
4901	94	1	3002

== Allele distribution ==
HLA B*4901 frequencies
		freq
ref.	Population	(%)
	Portugal North	8.7
	Spain Basque Gipuzkoa Province	6.1
	Madeira	5.9
	Cameroon Yaounde	5.4
	Morocco Nador Metalsa (Berber)	5.1
	Kenya Nandi	4.6
	Sudanese	4.3
	Portugal South	4.1
	Tunisia Tunis	4.0
	India Jalpaiguri Toto	3.8
	Senegal Niokholo Mandenka	3.7
	Uganda Kampala	3.7
	Spain Eastern Andalusia	3.5
	Tunisia	3.5
	Georgia Tbilisi Kurds	3.4
	Spain Catalonia Girona	3.4
	Italy North (1)	3.3
	Cameroon Beti	3.2
	Israel Ashkenazi and Non Ashkenazi Jews	3.2
	Guinea Bissau	3.1
	France South East	2.7
	Israel Arab Druse	2.5
	Mali Bandiagara	2.5
	Jordan Amman	2.4
	Tunisia Ghannouch	2.4
	Georgia Tbilisi Georgians	2.3
	Saudi Arabia Guraiat and Hail	2.2
	Cameroon Bamileke	1.9
	Czech Republic	1.9
	Georgia Svaneti Svans	1.9
	Macedonia (4)	1.9
	Bulgaria	1.8
	Romanian	1.6
	Italy Bergamo	1.1
	Zambia Lusaka	1.1
	Belgium	1.0
	China North Han	1.0
	India Andhra Pradesh Golla	1.0
	Ireland Northern	1.0
	South African Natal Zulu	1.0
