= Long Lake Seaplane Base (Sinclair, Maine) =

Airport in Maine, United States of America

- IATA: none; ICAO: none; FAA LID: 92B

Summary
- Airport type: Public
- Owner: Ken Martin
- Serves: Sinclair, Maine
- Elevation AMSL: 581 ft / 177 m
- Coordinates: 47°11′35″N 068°13′53″W
- Interactive map of Long Lake Seaplane Base

Runways
Direction	Length		Surface
Direction	ft	m	Surface
15/33	25,000	7,620	Water
7/25	15,800	4,816	Water

Statistics (2009)
- Aircraft operations: 25
- Source: Federal Aviation Administration

Long Lake Seaplane Base (FAA LID: 92B) is a privately owned, public use seaplane base on Long Lake in Aroostook County, Maine, United States. It is located at the Long Lake Sporting Club, three nautical miles (6 km) northeast of the central business district of Sinclair, Maine.

== Facilities and aircraft ==
Long Lake Seaplane Base has two seaplane landing areas on the water: 15/33 is 25,000 by 4,000 feet (7,620 x 1,219 m) and 7/25 is 15,800 by 2,640 feet (4,816 x 805 m). For the 12-month period ending August 13, 2009, the airport had 25 general aviation aircraft operations, an average of 2 per month.

== See also ==
- List of airports in Maine
- Long Lake Seaplane Base (Naples, Maine) at 43°59′13″N 070°37′06″W
