= Millinocket Municipal Airport =

- IATA: MLT; ICAO: KMLT; FAA LID: MLT

Summary
- Airport type: Public
- Owner: Town of Millinocket
- Serves: Millinocket, Maine
- Elevation AMSL: 408 ft / 124 m
- Coordinates: 45°38′52″N 068°41′08″W
- Interactive map of Millinocket Municipal Airport

Runways
Direction	Length		Surface
Direction	ft	m	Surface
11/29	4,713	1,437	Asphalt
16/34	4,008	1,222	Asphalt

Statistics (2006)
- Aircraft operations: 7,700
- Based aircraft: 15
- Source: Federal Aviation Administration

Millinocket Municipal Airport (IATA: MLT, ICAO: KMLT, FAA LID: MLT) is a town-owned, public-use airport located one nautical mile (2 km) southeast of the central business district of Millinocket, a town in Penobscot County, Maine, United States. It once offered commercial airline service on Northeast Airlines.

== Facilities and aircraft ==
Millinocket Municipal Airport covers an area of 322 acres (130 ha) at an elevation of 408 feet (124 m) above mean sea level. It has two asphalt paved runways: 11/29 measuring 4,713 x 100 feet (1,437 x 30 m) and 16/34 measuring 4,008 x 100 feet (1,222 x 30 m).

For the 12-month period ending August 18, 2006, the airport had 7,700 aircraft operations, an average of 21 per day: 82% general aviation, 13% military and 5% air taxi. At that time there were 15 aircraft based at this airport: 93% single-engine and 7% ultralight.

== See also ==
- List of airports in Maine
- Millinocket Seaplane Base
