= Pittsfield Municipal Airport (Maine) =

- IATA: none; ICAO: none; FAA LID: 2B7

Summary
- Airport type: Public
- Owner: Town of Pittsfield
- Serves: Pittsfield, Maine
- Elevation AMSL: 197 ft / 60 m
- Coordinates: 44°46′07″N 069°22′28″W

Map
- Location of airport in Maine 2B7 (the United States)

Runways
Direction	Length		Surface
Direction	ft	m	Surface
18/36	4,003	1,220	Asphalt

Statistics (2011)
- Aircraft operations: 8,700
- Based aircraft: 43
- Source: Federal Aviation Administration

Pittsfield Municipal Airport (FAA LID: 2B7) is a town owned, public use airport located one nautical mile (2 km) southeast of the central business district of Pittsfield, a town in Somerset County, Maine, United States. It is included in the National Plan of Integrated Airport Systems for 2011–2015, which categorized it as a general aviation facility.

== Facilities and aircraft ==
Pittsfield Municipal Airport covers an area of 325 acres (132 ha) at an elevation of 197 feet (60 m) above mean sea level. It has one runway designated 18/36 with an asphalt surface measuring 4,003 by 100 feet (1,220 x 30 m).

For the 12-month period ending August 13, 2011, the airport had 8,700 aircraft operations, an average of 23 per day: 99% general aviation and 1% air taxi. At that time there were 43 aircraft based at this airport: 77% single-engine, 14% multi-engine, and 9% glider.

== See also ==
- List of airports in Maine
