= Sugarloaf Regional Airport =

- IATA: none; ICAO: none; FAA LID: B21

Summary
- Airport type: Public
- Owner: Town of Carrabassett Valley
- Serves: Carrabassett Valley, Maine
- Elevation AMSL: 885 ft / 270 m
- Coordinates: 45°05′07.2″N 070°12′58.8″W
- Interactive map of Sugarloaf Regional Airport

Runways
Direction	Length		Surface
Direction	ft	m	Surface
17/35	2,800	853	Asphalt

Statistics (2006)
- Aircraft operations: 6,000
- Based aircraft: 11
- Source: Federal Aviation Administration

Sugarloaf Regional Airport is a public use airport in Franklin County, Maine, United States. It is owned by the Town of Carrabassett Valley and is located one nautical mile (1.85 km) north of the central business district.

== Facilities and aircraft ==
Sugarloaf Regional Airport covers an area of 65 acres (26 ha) at an elevation of 885 feet (270 m) above mean sea level. It has one runway designated 17/35 with an asphalt surface measuring 2,800 by 75 feet (853 x 23 m).

For the 12-month period ending August 25, 2006, the airport had 6,000 aircraft operations, an average of 16 per day: 100% general aviation. At that time there were 11 aircraft based at this airport: 100% single-engine.

== See also ==
- List of airports in Maine
