= Long Lake Seaplane Base (Naples, Maine) =

- IATA: none; ICAO: none; FAA LID: 76B

Summary
- Airport type: Public use
- Owner: James M. Build
- Serves: Naples, Maine
- Elevation AMSL: 268 ft / 82 m
- Coordinates: 43°59′13″N 070°37′06″W
- Interactive map of Long Lake Seaplane Base

Runways
| Direction | Length | | Surface |
| Direction | ft | m | Surface |
|---|---|---|---|
| 16/34 | 15,000 | 4,572 | Water |

Statistics (2010)
- Aircraft operations: 260
- Source: Federal Aviation Administration

Long Lake Seaplane Base (FAA LID: 76B) is a privately owned, public use seaplane base on Long Lake in Cumberland County, Maine, United States. It is located one nautical mile (2 km) northeast of the central business district of Naples, Maine.

== Facilities and aircraft ==
Long Lake Seaplane Base has one seaplane landing area designated 16/34 with a water surface measuring 15,000 by 3,960 feet (4,572 x 1,207 m). For the 12-month period ending August 13, 2010, the airport had 260 general aviation aircraft operations, an average of 21 per month.

== See also ==
- List of airports in Maine
- Long Lake Seaplane Base (Sinclair, Maine) at 47°11′35″N 068°13′53″W
