= Deblois, Maine =

Town in Maine, United States

- Town
- Location within Maine Location within the United States
- Coordinates: 44°43′53″N 67°59′21″W
- Country: United States
- State: Maine
- County: Washington

Area
  - Total: 36.09 sq mi (93.47 km^{2})
  - Land: 35.84 sq mi (92.83 km^{2})
  - Water: 0.25 sq mi (0.65 km^{2})
- Elevation: 210 ft (64 m)

Population (2020)
  - Total: 74
  - Density: 2.1/sq mi (0.8/km^{2})
- Time zone: UTC-5 (Eastern (EST))
  - Summer (DST): UTC-4 (EDT)
- ZIP code: 04622
- Area code: 207
- FIPS code: 23-16865
- GNIS feature ID: 582435

Deblois is a town in Washington County, Maine, United States. The town was named after T.A. Deblois, president of the Bank of Portland. The population was 74 at the 2020 census.

== Geography ==
According to the United States Census Bureau, the town has a total area of 36.09 square miles (93.47 km^{2}), of which 35.84 square miles (92.83 km^{2}) is land and 0.25 square miles (0.65 km^{2}) is water.

== Demographics ==
Historical population
Census	Pop.	Note	%±
1860	131		—
1870	139		6.1%
1880	105		−24.5%
1890	76		−27.6%
1900	73		−3.9%
1910	69		−5.5%
1920	75		8.7%
1930	62		−17.3%
1940	55		−11.3%
1950	59		7.3%
1960	26		−55.9%
1970	20		−23.1%
1980	44		120.0%
1990	73		65.9%
2000	49		−32.9%
2010	57		16.3%
2020	74		29.8%
U.S. Decennial Census

=== 2010 census ===
As of the census of 2010, there were 57 people, 27 households, and 17 families living in the town. The population density was 1.6 inhabitants per square mile (0.6/km^{2}). There were 65 housing units at an average density of 1.8 per square mile (0.7/km^{2}). The racial makeup of the town was 94.7% White, 1.8% Native American, and 3.5% from two or more races.

There were 27 households, of which 22.2% had children under the age of 18 living with them, 44.4% were married couples living together, 11.1% had a female householder with no husband present, 7.4% had a male householder with no wife present, and 37.0% were non-families. 33.3% of all households were made up of individuals, and 11.1% had someone living alone who was 65 years of age or older. The average household size was 2.11 and the average family size was 2.65.

The median age in the town was 45.8 years. 19.3% of residents were under the age of 18; 0% were between the ages of 18 and 24; 28.1% were from 25 to 44; 28% were from 45 to 64; and 24.6% were 65 years of age or older. The gender makeup of the town was 52.6% male and 47.4% female.

=== 2000 census ===
As of the census of 2000, there were 49 people, 20 households, and 15 families living in the town. The population density was 1.5 inhabitants per square mile (0.58/km^{2}). There were 57 housing units at an average density of 1.7 per square mile (0.66/km^{2}). The racial makeup of the town was 98% White and 2% Native American.

There were 20 households, out of which 30% had children under the age of 18 living with them, 45% were married couples living together, 10% had a female householder with no husband present, and 25% were non-families. 25% of all households were made up of individuals, and 5% had someone living alone who was 65 years of age or older. The average household size was 2.5 and the average family size was 2.7.

In the town, the population was spread out, with 22% under the age of 18, 8% from 18 to 24, 33% from 25 to 44, 31% from 45 to 64, and 6% who were 65 years of age or older. The median age was 36 years. For every 100 females, there were 113 males. For every 100 females age 18 and over, there were 124 males.

The median income for a household in the town was $18,750, and the median income for a family was $16,875. Males had a median income of $17,083 versus $0 for females. The per capita income for the town was $11,814. 20% of the population and 20% of families were below the poverty line. 0% of those under the age of 18 and 43% of those 65 and older were living below the poverty line.
