= Hewitt (surname) =

Hewitt is a surname. Notable people with the name include:

== A ==
- Abram Hewitt (1822–1903), American politician, lawyer and iron manufacturer
- Alan Hewitt (1915–1986), American actor
- Alan Hewitt (musician), American composer, producer and recording and performing artist
- Andrea Hewitt (born 1982), New Zealand triathlete
- Andrew Hewitt (born 1976), British composer for film and television
- Angela Hewitt (born 1958), Canadian pianist
- Ann Cooper Hewitt (1914–1956), American heiress who was a party in involuntary sterilization legal cases
- Anthony Hewitt (pianist) (born 1971), English pianist
- Anthony Hewitt (baseball) (born 1989), American baseball player
- Arthur Hathaway Hewitt (1858–1929), American lawyer and politician from California
- Ashton Hewitt (born 1994), Welsh rugby union footballer

== B ==
- Beatrice Pauline Hewitt (1873–1956), British painter
- Bec Hewitt (born 1983), Australian actress and singer
- Bill Hewitt (American football) (1909–1947), American football player
- Bill Hewitt (basketball) (1944–2026), American basketball player
- Bill Hewitt (politician) (1930–2016), Australian politician from Queensland
- Bill Hewitt (sportscaster) (1928–1996), Canadian radio and television sportscaster
- Bob Hewitt (born 1940), Australian tennis player; convicted rapist
- Brian George Hewitt (born 1949), English academic linguist

== C ==
- Carl Hewitt (1944–2022), American computer scientist
- C. R. Hewitt (Cecil Rolph Hewitt) (1901–1994), British police officer and writer
- Charles Hewitt (rower) (born 1949), American rower and reinsurance broker
- Charles Gordon Hewitt (1885–1920), Canadian entomologist
- Charles J. Hewitt (1867–1940), businessman, banker and politician from New York
- Charlie Hewitt (artist) (born 1946), American painter, printmaker and sculptor
- Charlie Hewitt (footballer) (1884–1966), English football player and manager
- Charlie Hewitt (rugby union) (born 1995), English rugby union footballer
- Chich Hewitt (born 1945), Anglican cleric
- Chris Hewitt (born 1974), American football player and coach
- Chris Hewitt (journalist), British film critic, journalist and broadcaster
- Corin Hewitt (born 1971), American artist
- Cruz Hewitt (born 2008), Australian tennis player

== D ==
- Dafydd Hewitt (born 1985), Welsh rugby union footballer
- Dalayna Hewitt (born 2000), American tennis player
- Daniel Hewitt, British journalist and presenter
- Darryl Hewitt (born 1958), Australian rules footballer
- Dave Hewitt (rugby league) (born 1995), English rugby league footballer
- Dave Hewitt (writer) (1961–2025), British magazine editor
- David Hewitt (rugby union, born 1939) (born 1939), Irish rugby union footballer
- David Hewitt (rugby union, born 1980) (born 1980), Irish rugby union footballer
- David L. Hewitt (born 1939), American film director and producer
- Dean Hewitt (born 1994), Australian curler
- Debbie Hewitt (born 1963), British businesswoman and sports administrator
- Dennis George Wyldbore Hewitt (1897–1917), British Army officer, Victoria Cross recipient
- Dick Hewitt (1943–2017), English footballer
- Don Hewitt (1922–2009), American television news producer

== E ==
- Edgar Ludlow-Hewitt (1886–1973), British Royal Air Force commander
- Edwin Hewitt (1920–1999), American mathematician
- Edwin Hewitt (rugby union) (born 1988), South African rugby union footballer
- Edwin Hawley Hewitt (1874–1939), American architect
- Eliza Edmunds Hewitt (1851–1920), American Presbyterian hymn writer
- Elliott Hewitt (born 1994), Welsh football player
- Emily C. Hewitt (born 1944), American lawyer, judge and minister
- Emma Hewitt (born 1988), Australian singer-songwriter
- Emma Churchman Hewitt (1850–1921), American writer and journalist
- Eric Hewitt (1935–2008), English cricketer
- Eric John Hewitt (1919–2001), British plant physiologist
- Evan Hewitt (born 1978), Australian rules footballer

== F ==
- Fayette Hewitt (1831–1909), American lawyer and official from Kentucky
- Fenelon D. Hewitt (1883–1961), American lawyer and politician from Mississippi
- Florence Ellen Hewitt (1910–1979), South African botanist
- Foster Hewitt (1902–1985), Canadian radio sports broadcaster
- Frank Hewitt (musician) (1935–2002), American jazz pianist
- Frank Hewitt (rugby union) (born 1906), Irish rugby union footballer
- Frankie Hewitt (1931–2003), American theater producer
- Fred Hewitt (1883–1951), Australian rules footballer
- Frederic William Hewitt (1857–1916), British anaesthetist
- Frederick Hewitt (1908–1976), Australian company director and politician
- Frederick Hewitt (field hockey) (1916–2010), American field hockey player

== G ==
- Gareth Hewitt (born 1976), British rugby league footballer
- Garth Hewitt (born 1946), English Anglican priest and singer‑songwriter
- Gavin Hewitt (born 1951), British journalist and presenter
- Geoffrey Hewitt (1934–2019), British chemical engineer and academic
- George Hewitt (footballer) (born 1878), English footballer
- George Wattson Hewitt (1841–1916), American architect
- Gigi Hewitt (born 1972), United States Virgin Islands equestrian
- Gloria Conyers Hewitt (born 1935), American mathematician
- Glynn Hewitt (born 1953), Australian football player
- Godfrey Hewitt (1940–2013), British evolutionary geneticist and academic
- Goldsmith W. Hewitt (1834–1895), American politician from Alabama
- Graily Hewitt (1864–1952), British calligrapher and novelist
- Guy Hewitt (born 1967), Barbadian-British Anglican priest

== H ==
- Harold Hewitt (rowing) (born 1938), Australian rowing coxswain
- Harold Hewitt (trade unionist) (1899–1968), British trade unionist and politician
- Harry Hewitt (c. 1861–1907), Indigenous Australian cricketer and Australian rules footballer
- Harry Hewitt (English footballer) (1919–2011), English footballer
- Harry Lovell-Hewitt (born 1998), English judoka
- Helen Margaret Hewitt (1900–1977), American musicologist and educator
- Helene Hewitt, British climate scientist
- Henry Hewitt (painter) (1818–1879), English landscape painter
- Henry Charles Hewitt (1885–1968), British actor
- Henry Kent Hewitt (1887–1972), United States Navy admiral
- Hugh Hewitt (born 1956), American radio talk show host

== I ==
- Ibrahim Hewitt, British journalist and activist

== J ==
- Jack Hewitt (born 1951), American dirt track racing driver
- Jacqueline Hewitt (born 1958), American astrophysicist
- Jake Hewitt (1870–1959), American baseball pitcher
- James Hewitt (born 1958), British Army officer, lover of Diana, Princess of Wales
- James Hewitt (musician) (1770–1827), American conductor, composer and music publisher
- James Hewitt, 1st Viscount Lifford (1712–1789), Irish lawyer and judge, and Lord Chancellor of Ireland
- James Hewitt, 2nd Viscount Lifford (1750–1830), Anglo-Irish peer and Church of Ireland cleric
- James Hewitt, 4th Viscount Lifford (1811–1887), Irish peer
- Jamie Hewitt (cricketer) (born 1976), English cricketer
- Jamie Hewitt (footballer) (born 1968), English football player
- Jarrod Hewitt (born 1997), American football player
- Jaslyn Hewitt (born 1983), Australian tennis player
- Jason Hewitt (born 1983), English ice hockey player
- Jason Hewitt (baseball) (born 1974), Australian baseball player
- Jean Hewitt (1925–1997), English-American food writer and home economist
- Jeff Hewitt (American football), American football player
- Jeff Hewitt (politician) (born 1953), American politician from California
- Jennifer Love Hewitt (born 1979), American actress, producer and singer
- Jessica Hewitt (born 1986), Canadian speed skater
- Jim Hewitt (born 1933), Canadian politician from British Columbia
- Joanna Hewitt (born 1949), Australian public servant
- Joe Hewitt (baseball) (1885–1948), American baseball player
- Joe Hewitt (footballer, born 1881) (1881–1971), English footballer
- Joe Hewitt (footballer, born 1902) (1902–?), English footballer
- Joe Hewitt (programmer) (born 1978), American software developer
- Joe Hewitt (RAAF officer) (1901–1985), Royal Australian Air Force officer
- John Hewitt (antiquary) (1807–1878), English antiquarian, organist and official
- John Hewitt (priest, born 1755) (1755–1804), Anglican priest in Ireland
- John Hewitt (entrepreneur) (born 1949), American businessman
- John Hewitt (footballer) (born 1963), Scottish footballer and manager
- John Hewitt (herpetologist) (1880–1961), South African zoologist
- John Hewitt (mayor) (1943–2011), New Zealand local politician
- John Hewitt (pentathlete) (born 1925), British Olympic pentathlete
- John Hewitt (poet) (1907–1987), poet from Northern Ireland
- John Hewitt (priest, died 1588) (died 1588), English Catholic priest and martyr
- John Hewitt (rugby union, born 1928) (1928–2019), Irish rugby union footballer
- John Hewitt (rugby union, born 1960), Irish rugby union footballer
- John Hill Hewitt (1801–1890), newspaper editor
- John Haskell Hewitt (1835–1920), American classical scholar and educator
- John Hill Hewitt (1801–1890), American composer, playwright and poet
- John Marshall Hewitt (1841–1888), American politician from Arkansas
- John Napoleon Brinton Hewitt (1859–1937), American linguist and ethnographer
- John K. Hewitt (born 1952), English behavioural geneticist
- Jon Hewitt (born 1959), Australian film director
- Joseph Hewitt (judge) (1754–1794), Anglo-Irish barrister, politician and judge
- Sir Joseph Hewitt, 1st Baronet (1865–1923), English solicitor and mine owner
- Judi Hewitt, Finnish-New Zealand bio-statistician and ecologist

== K ==
- Kathleen Hewitt (1893–1980), British author and playwright
- Kerr Hewitt, Canadian actor and writer

== L ==
- Lauren Hewitt (born 1978), Australian sprinter
- Lee Hewitt (born 1960), American politician from South Carolina
- Len Hewitt (1920–1979), Welsh football player
- Lenox Hewitt (1917–2020), Australian public servant
- Leslie Hewitt (born 1977), American visual artist
- Leslie R. Hewitt (1867–1936), American lawyer, judge and politician
- Lisa Hewitt, Canadian country music singer
- Lleyton Hewitt (born 1981), Australian tennis player

== M ==
- Machel St Patrick Hewitt, Jamaican cricket analyst and journalist
- Margaret Hewitt (sociologist) (1928–1991), British sociologist, academic and churchwoman
- Margaret Hewitt (suffragette) (1889–1972), British suffragette employed by the Women's Social and Political Union
- Mark Hewitt (potter) (born 1955), English studio potter in North Carolina
- Mark Alan Hewitt (born 1953), American architect, preservationist and architectural historian
- Martin Hewitt (actor) (born 1958), American actor and businessman
- Martin Hewitt (adventurer) (born 1980), British army officer and disabled mountaineer
- Marty Hewitt (born 1965), English footballer
- Martin Hewitt (police officer) (born 1966), British senior police officer
- Marvin Hewitt (1922–1991), American impostor
- Mary E. Hewitt (1807–1884), American poet and editor
- Mattie Edwards Hewitt (1869–1956), American photographer
- Maurice Hewitt (1884–1971), French violinist and conductor
- Michael Hewitt (born 2000), Scottish footballer
- Mike Hewitt (footballer) (born 1944), Scottish football goalkeeper
- Mike Hewitt (politician) (born 1946), American politician from Washington State

== N ==
- Nancy A. Hewitt (born 1951), American academic
- Nev Hewitt (1920–2016), Australian politician
- Neville Hewitt (American football) (born 1993), American football player
- Norm Hewitt (born 1968), New Zealand rugby union footballer

== O ==
- Orville Hewitt (1901–1955), American college football player and coach

== P ==
- Paolo Hewitt (born 1958), English music journalist and writer
- Patricia Hewitt (born 1948), British politician
- Paul Hewitt (born 1963), American college basketball coach
- Paul Hewitt (psychologist), Canadian psychologist
- Paul G. Hewitt (born 1931), American physicist, author and cartoonist
- Paul Sinton-Hewitt (born 1960), English social entrepreneur
- Peter Hewitt (businessman) (born 1953), English business and civic figure
- Peter Hewitt (director) (born 1962), English film director and writer
- Peter Cooper Hewitt (1861–1921), American electrical engineer

== R ==
- Rachel Hewitt, British writer and academic
- Raymond Hewitt (1941–1988), American civil rights activist and Black Panther
- Richard Hewitt (cricketer) (1844–1920), Australian cricketer
- Richard Thornton Hewitt (1917–1994), British Army officer
- Robert Hewitt (1906–1978), American wrestler
- Robert Hewitt, Jr., American real estate investor and numismatist
- Ron Hewitt (footballer, born 1924) (1924–2011), English footballer
- Ron Hewitt (footballer, born 1928) (1928–2001), Welsh footballer
- Ryan Hewitt (born 1991), American football player
- Ryan Hewitt (music producer), American music producer

== S ==
- Sam Hewitt (born 1999), English rugby league footballer
- Samuel Hewitt (fl.1843), American inventor
- Seán Hewitt (born 1990), British and Irish poet and novelist
- Sharon Hewitt (born 1958), American politician from Louisiana
- Simon Hewitt (born 1961), French cricketer
- Sinton Hewitt (1887–1976), Australian long-distance runner
- Sitara Hewitt (born 1981), Canadian-American actress and model
- Stanley Hewitt (1936–2001), Irish cricketer and rugby union footballer
- Stephen Hewitt (born 1958), Australian curler
- Steve Hewitt (born 1971), English musician, singer-songwriter and record producer
- Steven Hewitt (born 1993), English footballer
- Steven Hewitt (cricketer) (born 1963), English cricketer

== T ==
- Ted Hewitt, American country music producer and musician
- Ted Hewitt (rugby union) (1924–2003), English rugby union footballer
- Thomas Hewitt (sport shooter) (born 1950), Irish sports shooter
- Tom Hewitt (actor) (born c.1957), American actor and stage performer
- Tom Hewitt (footballer) (1889–1980), Welsh football player
- Tom Hewitt (rugby league) (born 1985), Australian rugby league footballer
- Tom Hewitt (rugby union) (1905–1991), Irish rugby union footballer
- Toni Hewitt (born 1951), American swimmer
- Tony Hewitt, British house music DJ and producer
- Troy Hewitt (born 1990), English footballer

== V ==
- Victor Hewitt (1913–2005), Irish rugby union footballer
- Virginia Hewitt (1925–1986), American actress
- Vivian Hewitt (1888–1965), Welsh aviator
- Vivian Davidson Hewitt (1920–2022), American librarian and art collector

== W ==
- Walter Hewitt (1854–1910), English rugby union footballer
- William Hewitt (cricketer) (1795–1870), English cricketer
- William Hewitt (footballer) (fl.1923–1934)), French footballer
- William Hewitt (minister) (born 1951), Church of Scotland minister
- W. A. Hewitt (William Abraham Hewitt) (1875–1966), Canadian sports executive and journalist; father of Foster Hewitt
- William Alexander Hewitt (1914–1998), American chief executive and diplomat
- William Henry Hewitt (1884–1966), South African soldier, recipient of the Victoria Cross
- William Wells Hewitt (1898–1966), English organist and composer
- William Lovell-Hewitt (1901–1984), English cricketer

== See also ==
- Hewit
- Hewett (surname)
- Hewet
