= John Hewitt =

John Hewitt may refer to:

== Sports ==
- John Hewitt (pentathlete) (born 1925), British Olympic pentathlete
- John Hewitt (rugby union, born 1928) (1928–2019), Irish rugby union player
- John Hewitt (swimmer) (1941–2017), Welsh swimmer
- John Hewitt (rugby union, born 1960), Irish rugby union player
- John Hewitt (footballer) (born 1963), Scottish footballer and manager

== Others ==
- John Hewitt (priest, died 1588), English Roman Catholic priest and Catholic martyr
- John Hewitt (priest, born 1755) (1755–1804), Anglican priest in Ireland
- John Hill Hewitt (1801–1890), American composer, playwright and poet
- John Hewitt (antiquary) (1807–1878), English antiquarian
- John Haskell Hewitt (1835–1920), American classical scholar and educator
- John Marshall Hewitt (1841–1888), American politician in Arkansas
- J. N. B. Hewitt (John Napoleon Brinton Hewitt, 1859–1937), American linguist and ethnographer
- John Hewitt (herpetologist) (1880–1961), South African zoologist and archaeologist
- John Hewitt (poet) (1907–1987), poet from Northern Ireland
- John Hewitt (mayor) (1943–2011), New Zealand politician
- John Hewitt (entrepreneur) (born 1949), American businessman
- John K. Hewitt (born 1952), British-American behavioral geneticist

== Other uses ==
- The John and Vivian Hewitt Collection of African-American Art

== See also ==
- Jonathan Hewitt, EastEnders character
- Jack Hewitt (born 1951), American racing driver
- John Hewett (disambiguation)
- John Hewet (disambiguation)
