= Joseph Hewitt =

Joseph or Joe Hewitt may refer to:

- Joseph Hewitt (judge) (1754–1794), English-born Irish barrister, politician and judge
- Sir Joseph Hewitt, 1st Baronet (1865–1923), English solicitor and mine owner
- Joe Hewitt (footballer, born 1881) (1881–1971), English footballer
- Joe Hewitt (baseball) (1885–?), American Negro league baseball player
- Joe Hewitt (RAAF officer) (1901–1985), Royal Australian Air Force officer
- Joe Hewitt (footballer, born 1902) (1902–?), English footballer
- Sir Joseph Hewitt, 2nd Baronet (1907–1973), son of Sir Joseph Hewitt, 1st Baronet, of the Hewitt baronets
- Joe Hewitt (programmer) (born 1978), American computer programmer

== See also ==
- Hewitt (disambiguation)
