= James Hewitt (disambiguation) =

James Hewitt (born 1958) is a British army officer, former lover of Diana, Princess of Wales.

James Hewitt may also refer to:

- James Hewitt, 1st Viscount Lifford (1712–1789), Anglo-Irish lawyer and judge.
- James Hewitt, 2nd Viscount Lifford (1750–1830), Anglo-Irish peer and clergyman, and his son James, 3rd Viscount..
- James Hewitt, 4th Viscount Lifford, (1811–1887),..
- James Hewitt (musician) (1770–1827), composer and conductor.
- Jamie Hewitt (cricketer) (born 1976), English cricketer
- Jamie Hewitt (footballer), (born 1968)
- Jim Hewitt (born 1933), Canadian politician
- James Hewitt (government official) (born 1991), American government official.
