= Martin Hewitt =

Martin Hewitt may refer to:

- Martin Hewitt (actor) (born 1958), American actor
- Martin Hewitt (adventurer) (born 1980), British disabled mountaineer, army officer and leader of the Adaptive Grand Slam
- Marty Hewitt (born 1965), English footballer
- Martin Hewitt (police officer), senior Metropolitan Police officer
- Martin Hewitt, a fictional detective created by Arthur Morrison
- Martin Hewitt, baby actor who portrayed Steven Webber on the American daytime drama General Hospital, in 1977
