= David Hewitt =

David Hewitt may refer to:

- David Hewitt (rugby union, born 1939) (1939–2026), Irish rugby union player
- David Hewitt (rugby union, born 1980), Irish rugby union player, currently playing at Lansdowne
- Dave Hewitt (rugby league) (born 1995), English rugby league coach and former footballer
- David L. Hewitt (born 1939), film director and producer
- Dave Hewitt (writer) (1961–2025), editor of The Angry Corrie, a hillwalking magazine
- Dave Hewitt (born 1950), musician, member of Babe Ruth
- David Hewitt, head of Record Plant remote recording, later his own Remote Recording Services

== See also ==
- Dave Hewett (born 1971), rugby union player
