= Anthony Hewitt =

Anthony Hewitt may refer to:

- Anthony Hewitt (pianist) (born 1971), British classical pianist
- Anthony Hewitt (baseball) (born 1989), American baseball outfielder
- Tony Hewitt (fl. 1990s–2020s), British house music DJ and producer
