= Thomas Hewett =

Thomas Hewett or Hewet may refer to:

- Sir Thomas Hewett, 1st Baronet (1605–1662), landowner in Hertfordshire
- Thomas Hewet (1656–1726), landowner and architect

== See also ==
- Tom Hewitt (disambiguation)
