= Richard Hewitt =

Richard Hewitt may refer to:

- Richard Hewitt (cricketer) (1844–1920), Australian cricketer
- Richard Thornton Hewitt (1917–1994), British Army officer
- Dick Hewitt (1943–2017), footballer

== See also ==
- Richard Hewet (died 1519), English politician
