= University at Buffalo School of Management =

Business school of SUNY-Buffalo

Coordinates: 42°59′59.2″N 78°47′13.3″W

- Type: Public university business school
- Established: 1923
- Parent institution: University at Buffalo
- Dean: Ananth Iyer
- Faculty: 82 (full-time)
- Undergraduates: 2952
- Postgraduates: 962
- Location: Amherst, New York, U.S.
- Website: management.buffalo.edu

The University at Buffalo School of Management is a business school located at the State University of New York at Buffalo. It is AACSB accredited in both business and accounting. UB School of Management is the highest ranking public business school in New York. The School of Management is also the largest business school in the SUNY system.

== History ==
The School of Business Administration, subsequently renamed the School of Management, was established in 1923. UB was authorized to grant the bachelor's degree in 1923, the MBA in 1931, and the PhD in 1949. In 1930, the School of Management received full accreditation by the AACSB.

== Ranking ==
Business school rankings

U.S. MBA Rankings
- Bloomberg (2025): 69
- U.S. News & World Report (2026): 66

- Bloomberg Businessweek, in its 2023 ranking of "Best Business Schools", ranked the School of Management the nation's No. 69 best full-time MBA program. Among public universities, the School of Management is No. 22. in the nation. Making Buffalo the best ranked public business school in New York.
- U.S. News & World Report, in its 2019 ranking of "best business schools", listed Buffalo as #66 nationally.
- U.S. News & World Report, in its 2017 ranking of "best undergraduate business programs", listed SUNY Buffalo as #77 nationally, making it the highest ranked SUNY undergraduate business school.
- Forbes magazine ranks the UB School of Management as #42 in the nation. It is also regarded as one of the world's best business schools based on the return on investment it provides MBA graduates. Buffalo is the best ranked public business school in New York.
- The Wall Street Journal, ranked the UB School of Management #9 in the nation among schools with strong regional recruiting bases.
- Military Times, ranked Buffalo as the #35 business school for veterans.
- Financial Times, ranked the Executive Masters of Business Administration (EMBA) program as #28 in the U.S. and #91 worldwide. Among the U.S. schools ranked, the EMBA program was #21 for graduates’ salary growth.
- Bloomberg Businessweek, in its 2016 ranking of "Best undergraduate business schools", ranked Buffalo #85. UB was the only public business school from New York to get ranked.

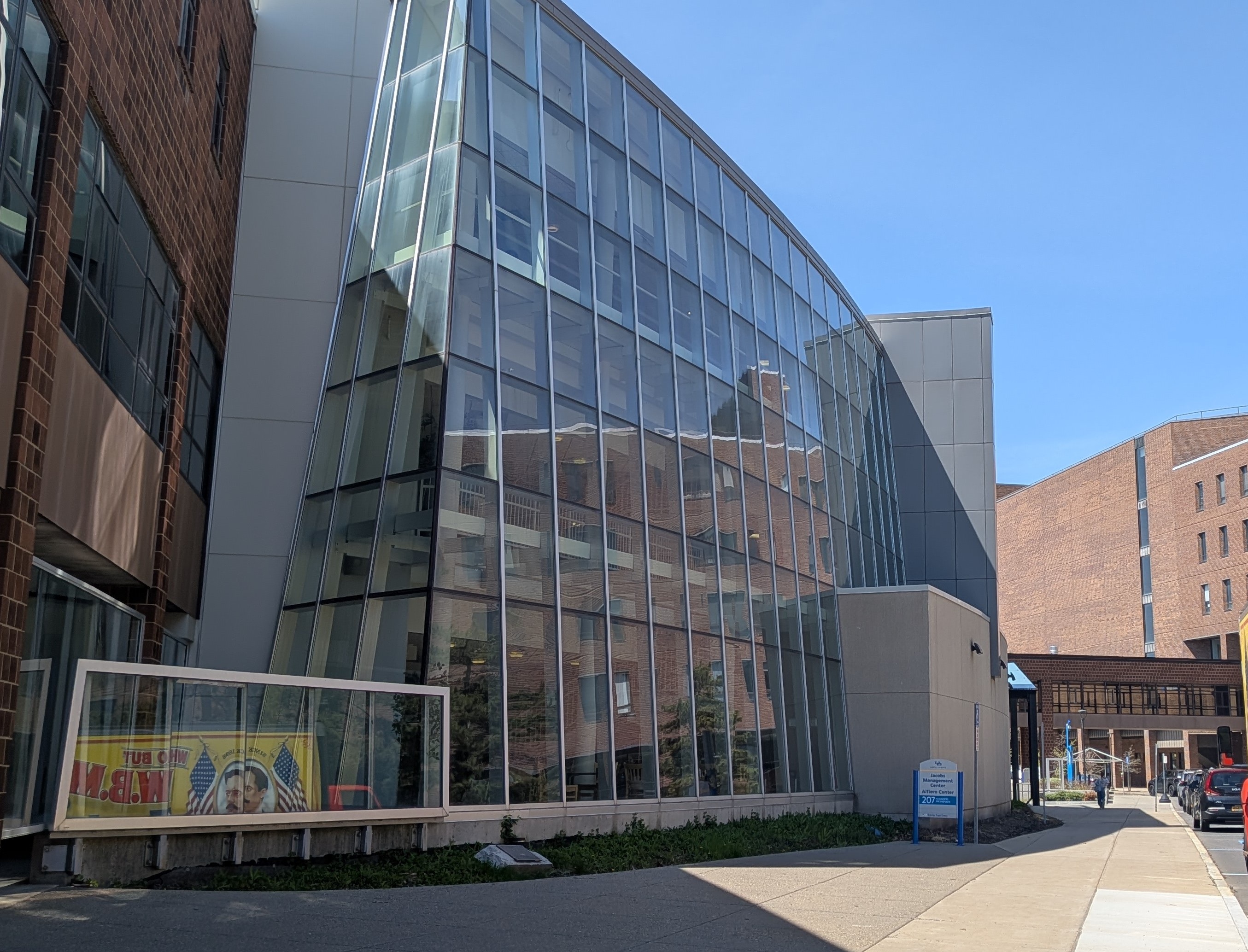
The exterior to the Alfiero Center, which is home to the School of Management

The school also offers the MBA (full-time/part-time, Executive), Master of Science and PhD.

== Notable alumni ==
- John R. Alm, Former President and CEO of Coca-Cola Enterprises
- Millard Drexler, Current Chairman and CEO of J.Crew and former CEO of Gap Inc.
- Brad Grey, Chairman and CEO of Paramount Pictures
- Harvey Weinstein, Co-Founder of Miramax and The Weinstein Company
- John Hewitt, U.S. entrepreneur and founder of Liberty Tax Service
- Jeremy Jacobs, billionaire owner of the Boston Bruins
- Bob Swan, former CEO of Intel

== See also ==
- List of business schools in the United States
- List of United States business school rankings
