= Victor Hewitt =

Rugby union player from Northern Ireland

- Full name: Victor Alexander Hewitt
- Born: 23 March 1913 Belfast, Ireland
- Died: November 2005 (aged 92)
- Notable relative(s): Frank Hewitt (brother); Tom Hewitt (brother); David Hewitt (nephew)

Rugby union career
- Position: Fly-half
International career
Years	Team	Apps	(Points)
1935–36	Ireland	6	(4)

Victor Alexander Hewitt (23 March 1913 — November 2005) was an Irish international rugby union player.

One of nine brothers, Hewitt was born in Belfast and educated along with his siblings at Royal Belfast Academical Institution, after which he attended Queen's University as a dentistry student.

Hewitt was a fly-half with Instonians and formed a halfback partnership with his brother Norman.

Capped six times, Hewitt followed his brothers Frank and Tom in representing Ireland when he appeared in their 1935 Home Nations campaign, playing against Scotland and Wales. After featuring on the Ulster side that held the 1935–36 All Blacks to a draw, Hewitt was chosen to partner George Morgan in the Test match, for his third cap. He played all three of Ireland's 1936 Home Nations matches and kicked a decisive drop goal in a win over Scotland at Murrayfield.

Hewitt had three nephews gain Ireland caps (David Hewitt, John Hewitt and Gerry Gilpin).

== See also ==
- List of Ireland national rugby union players
