= Instant Tax Service =

Instant Tax Service was, until a federal court ordered its closure as part of a fraud lawsuit, based out of Dayton, Ohio, and specialized in tax preparation, electronic filing, and refund anticipation loan services.

Founded in 2000 by Fesum Ogbazion, the company was the second venture for Ogbazion, who cut his teeth in the tax industry with the founding of Instant Refund Tax Service in Cincinnati, OH in 1994. Ogbazion sold Instant Refund Tax Service to Fortune 500 giant Jackson Hewitt in 1999 and used the proceeds from the sale to start Instant Tax Service.

In 2009, Instant Tax Service was ranked #93 on the nation's top 500 fastest growing companies list by Inc. Magazine. The company also ranked #1 on Entrepreneur Magazine's Top New Franchises list and the #1 lowest cost franchise in the United States in 2009.

Federal courts later ordered the closure of Instant Tax Service after prosecutors sought an injunction, alleging fraud.

== History ==
Fesum Berhane Ogbazion, who came to the United States with his family in 1982 from Ethiopia, opened his first tax office in 1994, Instant Refund Tax Service, while pursuing a degree in accounting and finance at the University of Cincinnati. Over the next five years, he opened 26 additional locations throughout the Cincinnati, Ohio and Northern Kentucky area.

In 1999, Jackson Hewitt offered to buy Instant Refund Tax Service from Ogbazion for a reported $3 million. In the year 2000 Ogbazion moved to Dayton, OH and founded Instant Tax Service, which began franchising in 2004.

== Closure ==
On August 25, 2015, a federal grand jury in Dayton, OH, indicted for conspiracy and tax-related crimes, Fesum Ogbazion, of Beavercreek, Ohio, and Kyle Wade, formerly of West Chester, Ohio on one count of impeding the administration of the Internal Revenue Code, one count of conspiracy to commit wire fraud and five counts of wire fraud. Ogbazion was also charged with six counts of money laundering, one count of evasion of payment of employment taxes, eight counts of failure to collect and pay over employment taxes and one count of bank fraud.

On April 20, 2007, the Internal Revenue Service investigated allegations of fraud involving eight franchise-owned Instant Tax Service locations in Missouri.

According to the government complaint in the case, ITS franchisees routinely prepare and file fraudulent federal tax returns, fabricate deductions and invent phony businesses. The suit further alleges that ITS franchisees file tax returns without customer authorization and without proper employer-issued W-2 wage statements, and charge customers exorbitant and bogus fees. Defendants and their franchisees allegedly lure mostly low-income customers into ITS stores by offering deceptive and misleading loans such as “Instant Cash” or “Holiday” loans, often before the tax return filing season begins. Defendants have denied the allegations in the complaint.

In 2023 a federal court permanently barred ITS Financial, LLC, TCA Financial, LLC, Tax Tree, LLC, and Fesum Ogbazion from preparing tax returns and from operating a tax-preparation business.
