= Simon Thrush =

New Zealand marine scientist

- Born: 10 November 1958 (age 67)
- Education: University of Otago; University of East Anglia
- Scientific career
- Fields: Marine Science
- Workplaces: University of Auckland
- Thesis: Community ecology of the sublittoral macrobenthos of Lough Hyne (INE) (1985)
- Doctoral advisor: Colin R. Townsend
- Website: Professor Simon Francis Thrush

Simon Francis Thrush FRSNZ (born 10 November 1958) is a New Zealand marine scientist and the former Director of the Institute of Marine Science at the University of Auckland.

He graduated from the University of Otago with a first class BSc in Zoology in 1980, and completed his PhD at the University of East Anglia in 1985. He is a Fellow of the Royal Society of New Zealand, and in 2010 was awarded the New Zealand Marine Sciences Life Time Achievement Award.

== Selected publications ==
- Ewa Siwicka; Simon Thrush; Judi Hewitt (2019). "Linking changes in species-trait relationships and ecosystem function using a network analysis of traits". Ecological Applications. 30 (1): e02010. doi:10.1002/eap.2010. PMID 31556174. Wikidata Q90297865.
- Casper Kraan; Simon Thrush; Carsten F. Dormann (2020). "Co-occurrence patterns and the large-scale spatial structure of benthic communities in seagrass meadows and bare sand". BMC Ecology. 20 (1): 37. doi:10.1186/s12898-020-00308-4. PMC 7346362. PMID 32641016. Wikidata Q97526489.
- Johanna Gammal; Judi Hewitt; Joanna Norkko; Alf Norkko; Simon Thrush (2020). "Does the use of biological traits predict a smooth landscape of ecosystem functioning?". Ecology and Evolution. 10 (19): 10395–10407. doi:10.1002/ece3.6696. PMID 33072268. Wikidata Q100727527.
