= John Hewet =

John Hewet may refer to:

- John Hewet (MP) 1413 and 1422, MP for Leicester
- Sir John Hewet, 1st Baronet (c. 1598-1657), of the Hewet baronets
- Sir John Hewet, 2nd Baronet (died 1684), of the Hewet baronets
- Sir John Hewet, 3rd Baronet (died 1737), of the Hewet baronets

== See also ==
- John Hewitt (disambiguation)
- John Hewett (disambiguation)
- John Huwet, a Member of Parliament for Devizes, Wiltshire in 1406
