= Jeff Hewitt =

Jeff Hewitt is the name of:

- Jeff Hewitt (American football) (born 1952), American football player
- Jeff Hewitt (politician) (born 1953), American politician from California
