= Frank Hewitt =

Frank Hewitt may refer to:

- Frank Hewitt (musician) (1935–2002), American hard bop jazz pianist
- Frank Hewitt (rugby union) (born 1906), Irish international rugby union player
