= Mark Hewitt =

Mark Hewitt may refer to:

- Mark Hewitt (potter), English-born studio potter
- Mark Alan Hewitt, American architect and architectural historian
