= Viscount Hewett =

Irish noble title

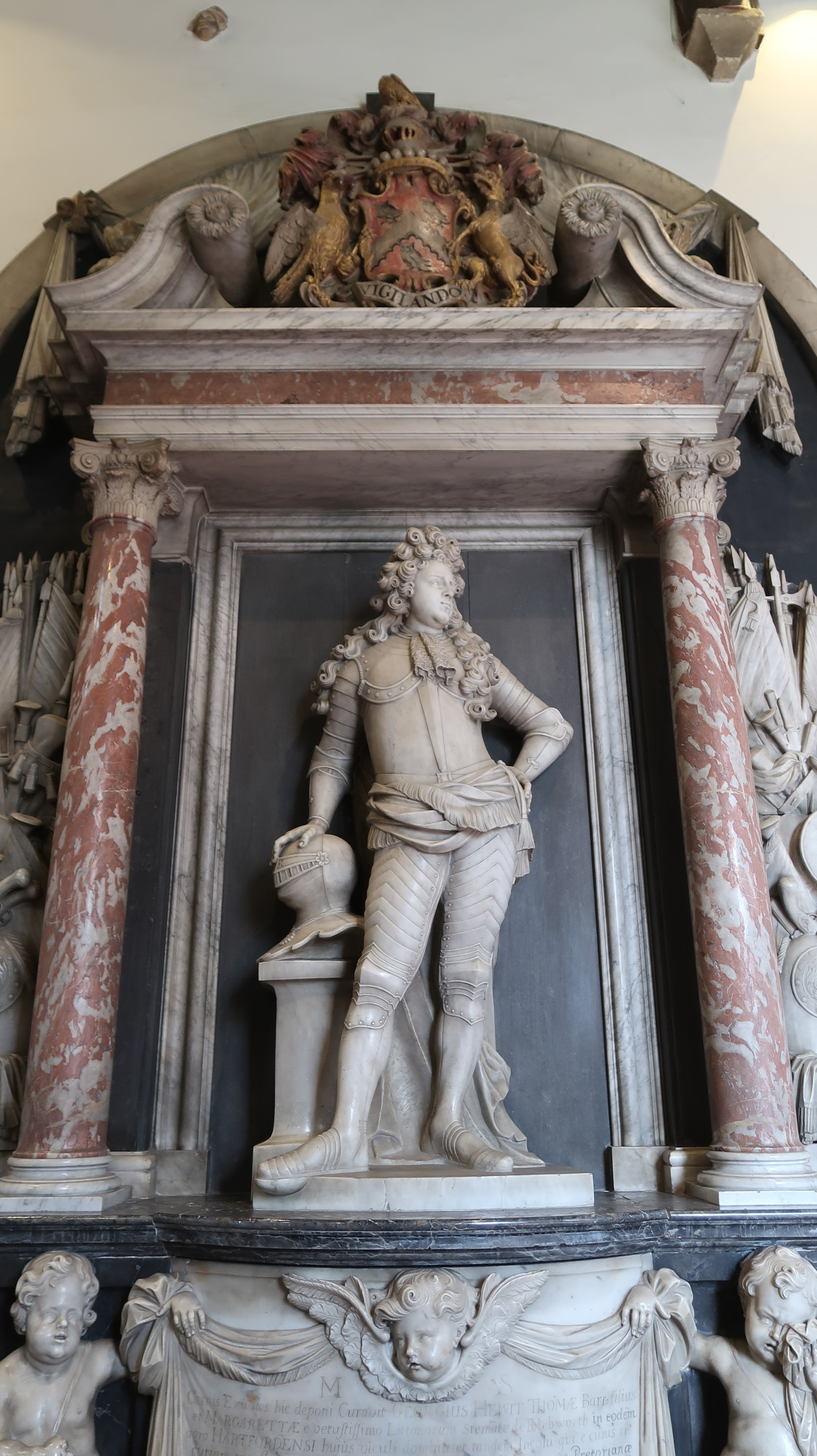
Monument of George, Viscount Hewyt of Gowram in the chancel of Great St Mary's Parish Church in Sawbridgeworth, Hertfordshire

Viscount Hewett was a title in the Peerage of Ireland. It was created on 9 April 1689 for Sir George Hewett, 2nd Baronet. He was made Baron of Jamestown at the same time, also in the Peerage of Ireland. The Hewett Baronetcy, of Pishiobury in the County of Hertford, was created in the Baronetage of England on 19 July 1660 for Thomas Hewett, Member of Parliament for Windsor. Both titles became extinct on the first Viscount's death in 1689.

The Hewet baronets of Headley Hall were members of another branch of this family.

== Hewett baronets, of Pishiobury (1660) ==
Escutcheon of the Hewett baronets of Pishiobury

- Sir Thomas Hewett, 1st Baronet (c. 1605 – 1662)
- Sir George Hewett, 2nd Baronet (1652–1689) (created Viscount Hewett in 1689)

== Viscount Hewett (1689) ==
- George Hewett, 1st Viscount Hewett (1652–1689)
