= Tom Hewitt =

Tom Hewitt may refer to:

- Tom Hewitt (actor), American performer; stage, TV and film career began in 1981; nominated for a Tony in 2001 for Rocky Horror
- Tom Hewitt, English guitarist, keyboard artist and lead singer for Clocks (British band)
- Tom Hewitt (rugby league) (born 1985), Australian player; signed with the Brisbane Broncos in 2007
- Tom Hewitt (rugby union) (1905–1991), Irish player
- Tom Hewitt (footballer) (1889–1980), Wrexham F.C., Chelsea F.C. and Wales international footballer
- Tom Hewitt (canoeist), Canadian slalom canoeist
- Thomas Hewitt (sport shooter) (born 1950), Irish sports shooter
- Leatherface's real name in The Texas Chainsaw Massacre 2003 movie and the 2006 prequel

== See also ==
- Hewitt (disambiguation)
