= Scottish watershed =

Drainage divide in Scotland

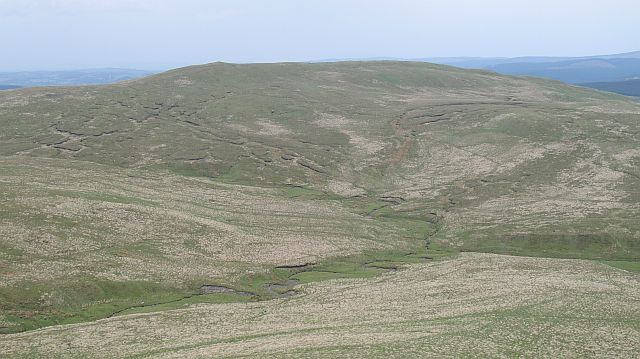
The first miles of the Tweed further upriver than the burn that carries the name Tweed, this is a confluence of the Powskein and Whitehope Burns. The Whitehope Burn is probably the branch of the system furthest from Berwick. The hill is Chalk Rig and it carries the Dumfriesshire/Peeblesshire march and the East-West watershed of Scotland.

The Scottish Mainland watershed is the drainage divide in Scotland that separates river systems that flow to the east into the North Sea from those that flow to the west into the Atlantic Ocean. At a point on the summit of Ben Lomond for example, looking west all water flows to the Firth of Clyde, and looking east all water flows into the Firth of Forth. Similarly Cumbernauld is a point on this line and arguably its Gaelic name has, for hundreds of years, reflected this fact, although there is some dispute about interpretation of the Gaelic phrase. The line joining all such points in Scotland is the Scottish Mainland watershed.

Although the concept of a geographical watershed is common, the first unequivocal reference to the Scottish watershed is to be found in Francis Groome's Ordnance Gazetteer of Scotland of 1884. H.A. Webster contributed an article to the General Survey section of Volume VI (published 1885) in which he states "The watershed or water-parting, which may be said to begin at Duncansbay [that is, Duncansby Head], follows an extremely tortuous course through Caithness and Sutherland ...". This was followed in 1895 with John Bartholomew's Survey Atlas of Scotland which shows the entire geographic feature, from the border with England to Duncansby Head.

== Route ==
Whilst the majority of the route is clearly understood (if not necessarily precisely defined), there is some ambiguity at the northern end, as Scotland also possesses a northern coast. As noted above, early writers tended to consider Duncansby Head, at the meeting of Moray and Pentland Firths as the natural end point. In 1986 Dave Hewitt mapped the line of the watershed from south to north, finishing at Cape Wrath and thus following the crest of the mountains of the Northwest Highlands along Scotland's west coast, he walked this route in early 1987. A third potential finish would be Dunnet Head - the most northerly point of the Scottish mainland - which the International Hydrographic Organization considered to be the northwestern limit of the North Sea in a 1953 publication.

== Completions ==
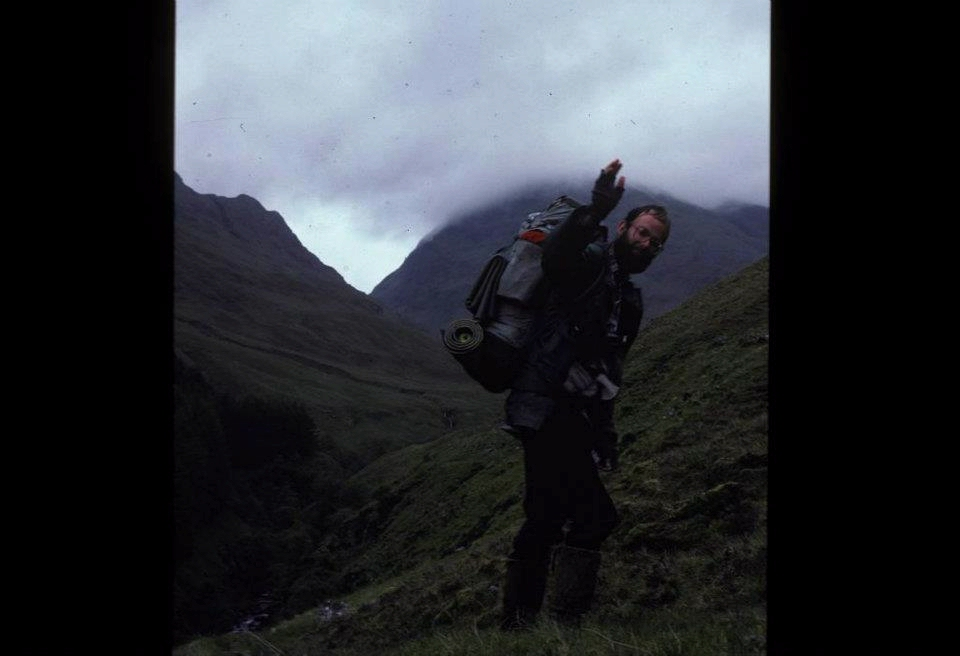
Dave Hewitt en route back to the watershed route after a rest day in Shiel Bridge in 1987.

The first person known to have walked the length of the Scottish watershed was Dave Hewitt, who completed the route from the English border to Cape Wrath in 1987. Eight people are now known to have now walked versions of Scottish watershed:

- Hewitt walked from the Anglo-Scottish border to Cape Wrath in a single push, April–June 1987
- the late Mike Allen walked from Land's End to Cape Wrath in numerous mainly short sections, April 1988 – October 1994
- Martin Prouse walked from Rowardennan to Ben Hope in one go, July–August 1994
- Peter Wright walked from the Anglo-Scottish border to Duncansby Head in eight sections, Jan–Oct 2005 The Royal Scottish Geographical Society (RSGS) reviewed Wright`s 'Ribbon of Wildness' in 2011, and in acknowledging the significance of the route, stated that "Ribbon of Wildness gives a vivid introduction to this hitherto largely unknown geographic feature".
- Malcolm Wylie completed a 131-day traverse of the UK, in 14 sections - Scottish sections 1996 and 2,000 - Peel Fell to Duncansby Head.
- Colin Meek completed a watershed run in 27 days in summer 2012 - Peel Fell to Duncansby Head.
- Chris Townsend completed a traverse from Peel Fell to Duncansby Head in 2013, 28 May – 25 July
- Elspeth Luke ran the entire watershed in a continuous 34-day epic from 13 July to 15 August 2015. She is the first woman to complete this journey.

== See also ==
- Geography of the North Sea
