= The Angry Corrie =

The Angry Corrie is a fanzine for hillwalkers in Scotland, first published in 1991. It is print-based and was also published on the web until June 2008. The fanzine is published quarterly.

The Angry Corrie tends to steer away from the more prosaic descriptions of hill routes or gear reviews, and accepts no advertising. Driven mainly by its unpaid contributors, it has a reputation for pursuing eccentric subjects with a great deal of reader participation.

Its editor since inception has been Dave Hewitt. Author of Walking the Watershed and A Bit of Grit on Haystacks, Hewitt has dabbled in journalism – most notably as editor of The Scotsman's outdoor pages until a revamp by Andrew Neil.

All issues are available as scanned pdf files from the Internet Archive. See external links.
