= Viscount Lifford =

Title in the peerage of Ireland

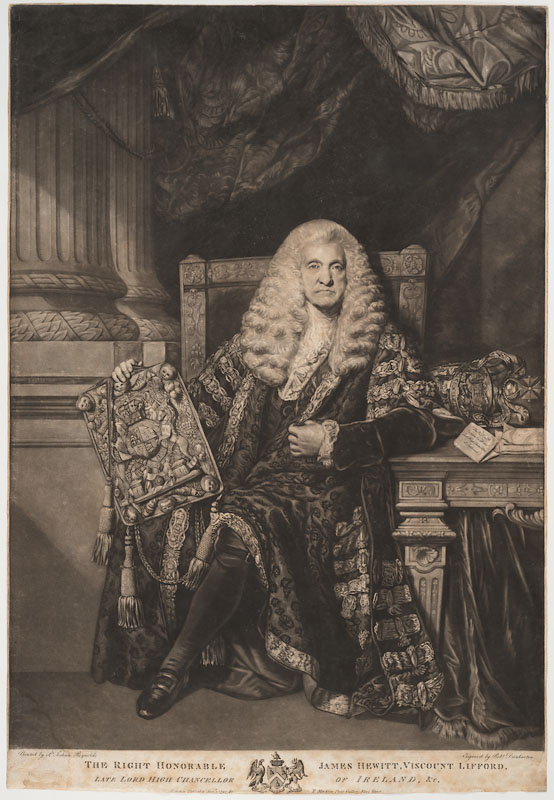
James Hewitt, 1st Viscount Lifford.

Viscount Lifford is a title in the Peerage of Ireland. It was created in 1781 for James Hewitt, 1st Baron Lifford, the Lord Chancellor of Ireland. He had already been created Baron Lifford, of Lifford in the County of Donegal, in 1768, also in the Peerage of Ireland. He was succeeded by his son, the second Viscount, who was Dean of Armagh from 1796 to 1830. His grandson, the fourth Viscount, sat in the House of Lords as an Irish representative peer from 1856 to 1887. His younger son, the sixth Viscount (who succeeded his elder brother), was a captain in the Royal Navy. His son, the seventh Viscount, fought in both the Second Boer War and the First World War. He was succeeded by his cousin, the eighth Viscount. He was the son of the Hon. George Wyldbore Hewitt, seventh son of the fourth Viscount. As of 2014 the titles are held by his son, the ninth Viscount, who succeeded in 1987.

The family seat is Field House, near Hursley, Hampshire. The former was Meenglass House, near Stranorlar, County Donegal.

== Viscounts Lifford (1781) ==
- James Hewitt, 1st Viscount Lifford (1709–1789)
- James Hewitt, 2nd Viscount Lifford (1751–1830)
- James Hewitt, 3rd Viscount Lifford (1783–1855)
- James Hewitt, 4th Viscount Lifford (1811–1887)
- James Wilfred Hewitt, 5th Viscount Lifford (1837–1913)
- Archibald Robert Hewitt, 6th Viscount Lifford (1844–1925)
- Evelyn James Hewitt, 7th Viscount Lifford (1880–1954)
- Alan William Wingfield Hewitt, 8th Viscount Lifford (1900–1987)
- Edward James Wingfield Hewitt, 9th Viscount Lifford (born 1949)

The heir apparent is the present holder's son Hon. James Thomas Wingfield Hewitt (born 1979).
The heir apparent's heir apparent is his son Harry Alexander Wyldbore Hewitt (born 2010).
