= Sackville School, Hildenborough =

Sackville School

Location
- Tonbridge Road; Hildenborough, Kent, TN11 9HN; England; 51°12′58″N 0°14′17″E

Information
- Type: Independent
- Motto: Latin: Per ardua ad palmas ("Through difficulties to prizes")
- Established: 1987
- Department for Education URN: 119007 Tables
- Ofsted: Reports
- Headmistress: Leoni Ellis
- Gender: Coeducational
- Age: 11 to 18
- Houses: Dragonfire, Lionheart, Falconcrest
- Colours: Green & Yellow
- Website: https://www.sackvilleschool.co.uk/

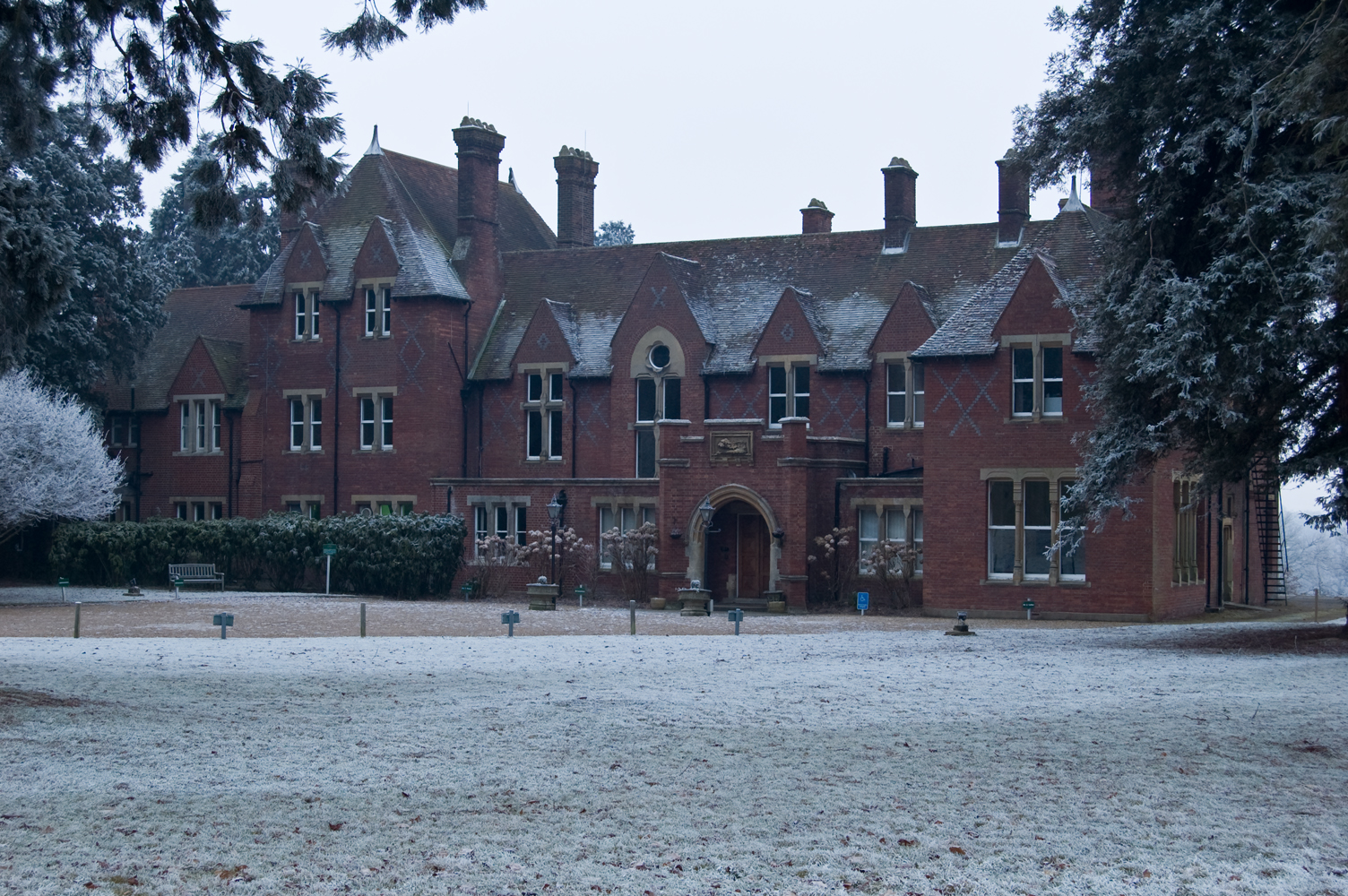
Main school building

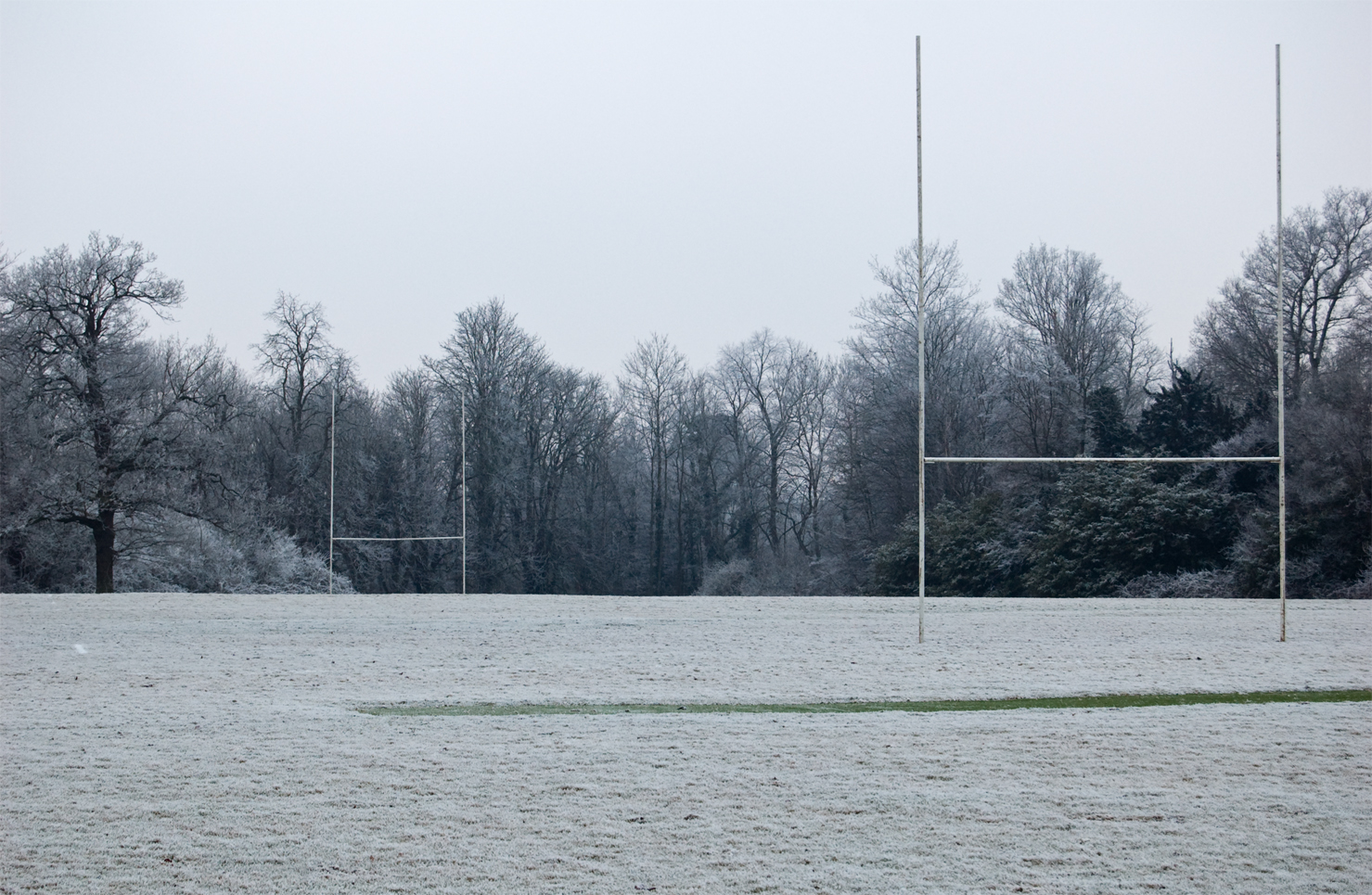
Sackville School rugby pitch in the winter.

Sackville School is a small profit-making coeducational independent school located in the village of Hildenborough, in Kent, England.

== History ==
Sackville, formerly Foxbush House, was built in 1866 for Charles Fitch Kemp, a London Chartered Accountant. The Charing Cross to Tonbridge railway line was in the process of construction and the purchase enabled him to combine his London career with his ambition to be a country landowner.

He and his wife, Sarah, had ten children (4 sons and 6 daughters) and a large staff of servants and gardeners to maintain the house. He kept a pack of dogs in kennels beyond the kitchen garden and employed his own cook. He played an important role in local affairs, being the first Chairman of the Hildenborough Parish Council when it was formed in 1894 and a churchwarden from 1869 until his death in 1907.

In 1912 the estate was sold to Barnett Lewis, a wealthy diamond merchant, who installed oak panelling in several of the reception rooms. On his death in 1929, the property was damaged only to be refurbished by Herbert Rae, whose wife's coat of arms is on the fireplace in the entrance hall.

During the Second World War, the house was requisitioned as the headquarters of the 59th Newfoundland Heavy Regiment, Royal Artillery. From 1949 to 1968, it was the Convent of Our Lady School, which had moved from Cannon Lane, Tonbridge. In 1968, St Thomas's School moved to the site from Sevenoaks, and later became Foxbush School. This in turn was replaced by Sackville School in 1987.

In 2014 former Irish rugby International John Hewitt became headteacher .
