= John Hewett =

John Hewett may refer to:

- John Hewett (chaplain) (1614–1658), chaplain to Charles I and later executed for treason as a Royalist
- John Norris Hewett (c. 1745–1790), English art collector and amateur artist
- John Short Hewett (1781–1835), English academic and priest
- John William Hewett (1824–1886), English hymnist and antiquary
- John Hewett (priest) (1830–1911), English priest, founder of All Saints', Babbacombe and father of below
- John Hewett (civil servant) (1854-1941), English colonial administrator and member of parliament

== See also ==
- John Hewitt (disambiguation)
- John Hewet (disambiguation)
