= Liberty Tax =

Tax preparation company

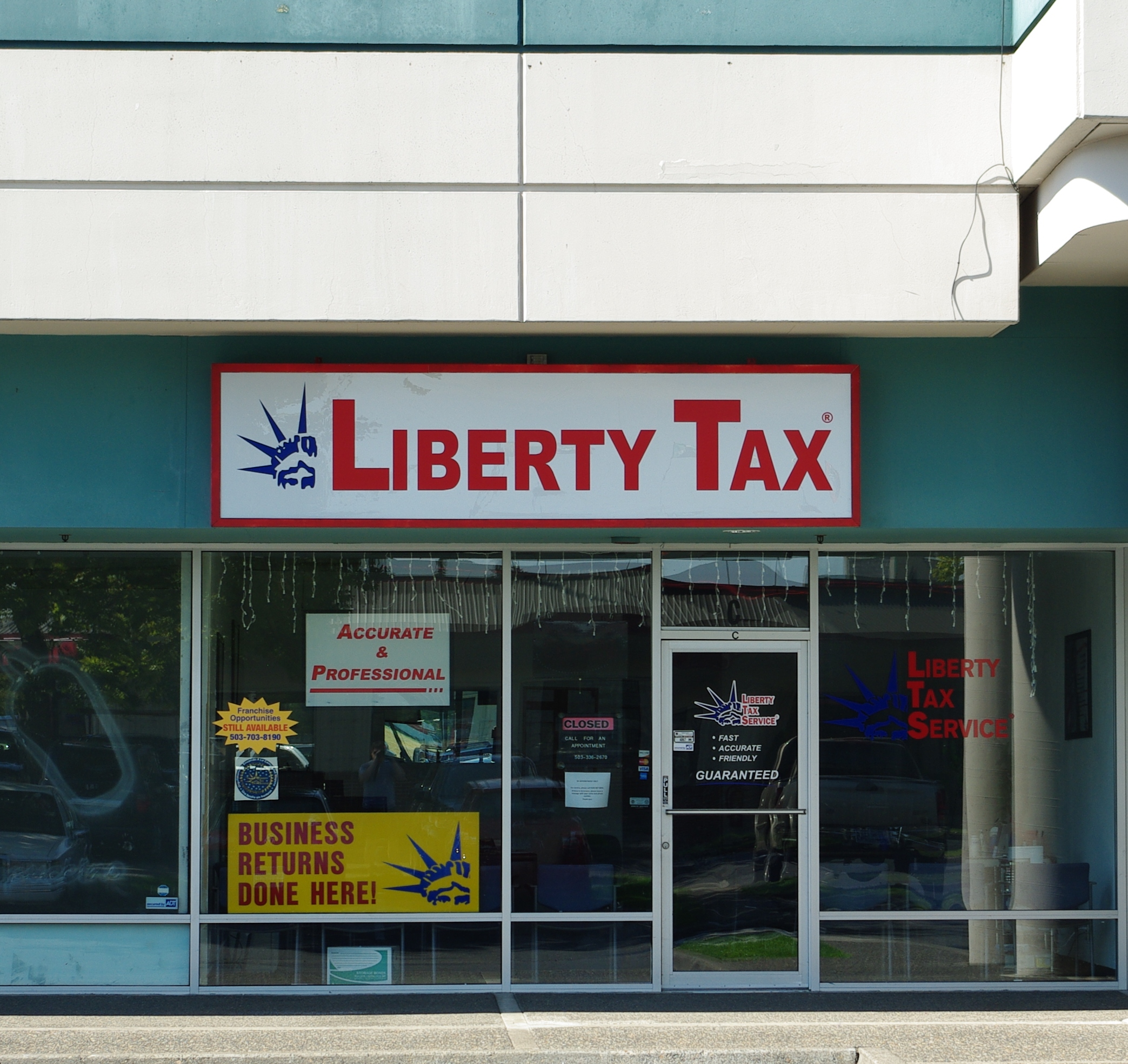
- Company type: Subsidiary
- Founded: 1997; 29 years ago Virginia Beach, Virginia, U.S.
- Founder: John Hewitt
- Key people: Scott Terrell, CEO
- Products: Tax preparation; Consumer loans; Business loans
- Parent: BasePoint Capital
- Website: www.libertytax.com

Liberty Tax is a chain of franchise and company-owned locations that provide tax preparation services. It is known for its wavers, people in Statue of Liberty costumes and Uncle Sam costumes, used as a form of guerrilla marketing. It is the third largest institutional tax preparation service provider in the United States and second largest in Canada.

== History ==
The company began in Canada in 1997 when John Hewitt, co-founder of Jackson Hewitt, acquired a Canadian tax franchisor, U&R Tax Depot. In 1998, the company became Liberty Tax Service and opened five offices in the United States. In 2012, it was named as a "Top 20 Franchise for the Buck" by Forbes, having grown to over 3,500 franchise locations.

In 2009, Liberty Tax was ordered to pay $1.3 million for engaging in unfair business practices related to its refund anticipation loans. It later settled with the Department of Justice over allegations that its franchisee locations inflated some customer tax returns between 2013 and 2018. Founder Hewitt was terminated as CEO in September 2017 after Liberty Tax reported poor financial performance and was forced to close down dozens of its offices due to allegations of tax fraud. Hewitt formed a competing business, ATAX, in 2019 and was sued by Liberty for stealing business from them by using inside information.

In 2019, Liberty Tax became a subsidiary of the Franchise Group. In 2021 it was purchased by and became a subsidiary of NextPoint Financial. The same year it was combined with LoanMe, a personal and small business loan company based in California. As of 2021, it is the third largest institutional tax preparation service provider in the United States and second largest in Canada.

In July 2023, NextPoint Financial, Liberty Tax's parent, filed for bankruptcy in Canada, and Chapter 15 bankruptcy in the United States. In January 2024, NextPoint Financial completed a going-concern sale transaction to BP Commercial Funding Trust, Series SPL-X. Liberty Tax will continue to operate normally under the new ownership.
