= Robert Porrett =

English amateur chemist and antiquary

Robert Porrett (1783–1868) was an English amateur chemist and antiquary.

== Life ==
The son of Robert Porrett, ordnance storekeeper at the Tower of London, he was born in London on 22 September 1783. He began work in his father's department as an assistant. He was appointed in 1795, promoted later to be chief of his department, and retired on a pension in 1850, when his services received official acknowledgment. He died on 25 November 1868, unmarried. Robert Collier, 1st Baron Monkswell was his nephew.

== Works ==
Porrett was elected Fellow of the Society of Antiquaries of London on 9 January 1840, and Fellow of the Royal Society in 1848. He was an original fellow of the Chemical Society, and also a Fellow of the Royal Astronomical Society. He was an authority on armour, on which he contributed several papers to Archæologia and the Proceedings of the Society of Antiquaries. His subordinate at the Tower, John Hewitt, was encouraged to take an interest in the national collection of arms and armour there, and produced a pioneering guide.

=== Chemist ===
In chemistry, towards the end of 1808, Porret found that by treating prussic acid with sulphuretted hydrogen a new acid was formed, which he first termed "prussous acid" (now: thiocyanic acid, HSCN). For this investigation he was awarded a medal by the Society of Arts. In 1814 he discovered the qualitative composition of the acid, and showed that it was formed by the union of prussic acid and sulphur, and termed it "sulphuretted chyazic acid". The later name "sulphocyanic acid" was given by Thomas Thomson, and its quantitative composition was determined in 1820 by Berzelius.

In 1814 Porrett also made the discovery of ferrocyanic acid, which he termed "ferruretted chyazic acid". He showed by the electrolysis of the salts, then known as triple prussiates, and by the isolation of the acid itself, that the iron contained in the salts must be regarded as forming part of the acid, thus confirming a suggestion previously put forward by Claude Louis Berthollet. He examined the properties of the acid, and showed that it can easily be oxidised by the air, Prussian blue being formed at the same time; this observation was later utilised in dyeing.

Porrett attempted to determine the quantitative composition of prussic acid: he showed that when it is oxidised the volume of carbonic acid formed is exactly twice that of nitrogen, but his other data were erroneous. The problem was solved shortly after by Joseph Louis Gay-Lussac. Porrett in 1813 made experiments with Rupert Kirk and William Wilson on the dangerous substance chloride of nitrogen.

His Observations on the Flame of a Candle (1817) supported Humphry Davy's view of the structure of flames. According to Porrett, the light is mainly due to free carbon formed in the flame by the decomposition of hydrocarbons.

=== Physicist ===
Porrett's contribution to physics was the discovery of electric endosmosis in 1814. The phenomenon had, according to Gustav Heinrich Wiedemann, been observed previously by the German scientist Ferdinand Friedrich Reuss (18 February 1778 (Tübingen, Germany) – 14 April 1852 (Stuttgart, Germany)), but Porrett's discovery was independent, and the phenomenon for a period went in Germany by his name.

=== Publications ===
The following is a list of Porrett's scientific papers:

- In the Transactions of the Society of Arts: 'A Memoir on the Prussic Acid' (1809, xxvii. 89–103).

In Nicholson's Journal:

- 'On the Prussic and Prussous Acids' (1810, xxv. 344).
- 'On the Combination of Chlorine with Oil of Turpentine' (1812, xxxiii. 194).
- 'On the Explosive Compound of Chlorine and Azote' (with R. Kirk and W. Wilson) (1813, xxxiv. 276).

In Philosophical Transactions:

- 'On the Nature of the Salts termed Triple Prussiates, and on Acids formed by the Union of certain Bodies with the Elements of Prussic Acid' (6 June 1814, p. 527).
- 'Further Analytical Data on the Constitution of Ferruretted Chyazic and Sulphuretted Chyazic Acids,' &c. (22 Feb. 1815).

In Thomson's Annals of Philosophy:

- 'Curious Galvanic Experiments' (1816, viii. 74).
- 'Observations on the Flame of a Candle' (viii. 337).
- 'On the Triple Prussiate of Potash' (1818, xii. 214).
- 'On the Anthrazothion of Von Grotthuss, and on Sulphuretted Chyazic Acid' (1819, xiii. 356).
- 'On Ferrochyazate of Potash and the Atomic Weight of Iron' (1819, xiv. 295).

In the Chemical Society's Memoirs:

- 'On the Chemical Composition of Gun-Cotton' (in conjunction with E. Teschemacher) (1846, iii. 258).
- 'On the Existence of a new Alkali in Gun-Cotton' (iii. 287).
