= Simon Hewitt =

English-born French cricketer

Personal information
- Full name: Simon Mark Hewitt
- Born: 30 July 1961 (age 65); Radcliffe, Lancashire, England
- Batting: Right-handed
- Bowling: Right-arm medium

Domestic team information
- Years: Team
- 1984: Oxford University
- 1989–2001: France
- FC debut: 28 April 1984 Oxford University v Lancashire
- Last FC: 30 May 1984 Oxford University v Gloucestershire
- ICC Trophy debut: 28 June 2001 France v Malaysia
- Last ICC Trophy: 6 July 2001 France v East and Central Africa

Career statistics
| Competition | First-class | ICC Trophy |
|---|---|---|
| Matches | 4 | 5 |
| Runs scored | 60 | 117 |
| Batting average | 12.00 | 23.40 |
| 100s/50s | 0/0 | 0/1 |
| Top score | 22 | 52 |
| Balls bowled | 389 | 192 |
| Wickets | 4 | 3 |
| Bowling average | 58.00 | 55.00 |
| 5 wickets in innings | 0 | 0 |
| 10 wickets in match | 0 | 0 |
| Best bowling | 2/52 | 2/47 |
| Catches/stumpings | 0/0 | 2/0 |
- Source: CricketArchive, 15 October 2007

Simon Mark Hewitt (born 30 July 1961) is an English-born former French first-class cricketer. A right-handed batsman and right-arm medium pace bowler, he played more than 100 times for the France national cricket team between 1989 and 2001, most of the time captaining the side, having previously played for Oxford University. His brother Steven played cricket for Cambridge University.

== Career ==
Hewitt began his cricketing career playing for Oxford University in 1984. He played four first-class matches for them that year, against Lancashire, Somerset, Middlesex and Gloucestershire.

He made his debut for France in September 1989, playing against the Marylebone Cricket Club (MCC) in a match played as part of the bicentenary celebrations of the French Revolution. He played on a tour to Austria in 1996, playing twice against the Austrian national team and in the 1996 European Nations Cup.

He played in the 1997 European Nations Cup in Zuoz, Switzerland, and took 3/44 in the final against Germany as France won by 1 run in a match that the Wisden Cricketers' Almanack named as one of the 100 best matches of the 20th century.

He played in the following years European Championship tournament and also in the 2000 tournament, despite becoming director of cricket in France in 1998. His playing career ended with the 2001 ICC Trophy in Canada.
