= Gareth Hewitt =

Scotland international rugby league footballer

Personal information
- Full name: Gareth Hewitt
- Born: 14 September 1976 (age 49)

Playing information
- Position: Centre
Club
Years	Team	Pld	T	G	FG	P
≤1998–≥98	Leeds Rhinos
≤1999–01	Salford City Reds
2001–≥01	Sheffield Eagles
2003–≥03	Keighley Cougars
	Total	0	0	0	0	0
Representative
Years	Team	Pld	T	G	FG	P
1998	Scotland	1

Gareth Hewitt (born 14 September 1976) is a former professional rugby league footballer who played as a centre in the 1990s and 2000s. He played at representative level for Scotland, and at club level for the Leeds Rhinos, Salford City Reds, Sheffield Eagles and the Keighley Cougars.

== International honours ==
Gareth Hewitt won a cap for Scotland in 1998 while at Leeds.
