= Samuel Greatheed =

British politician

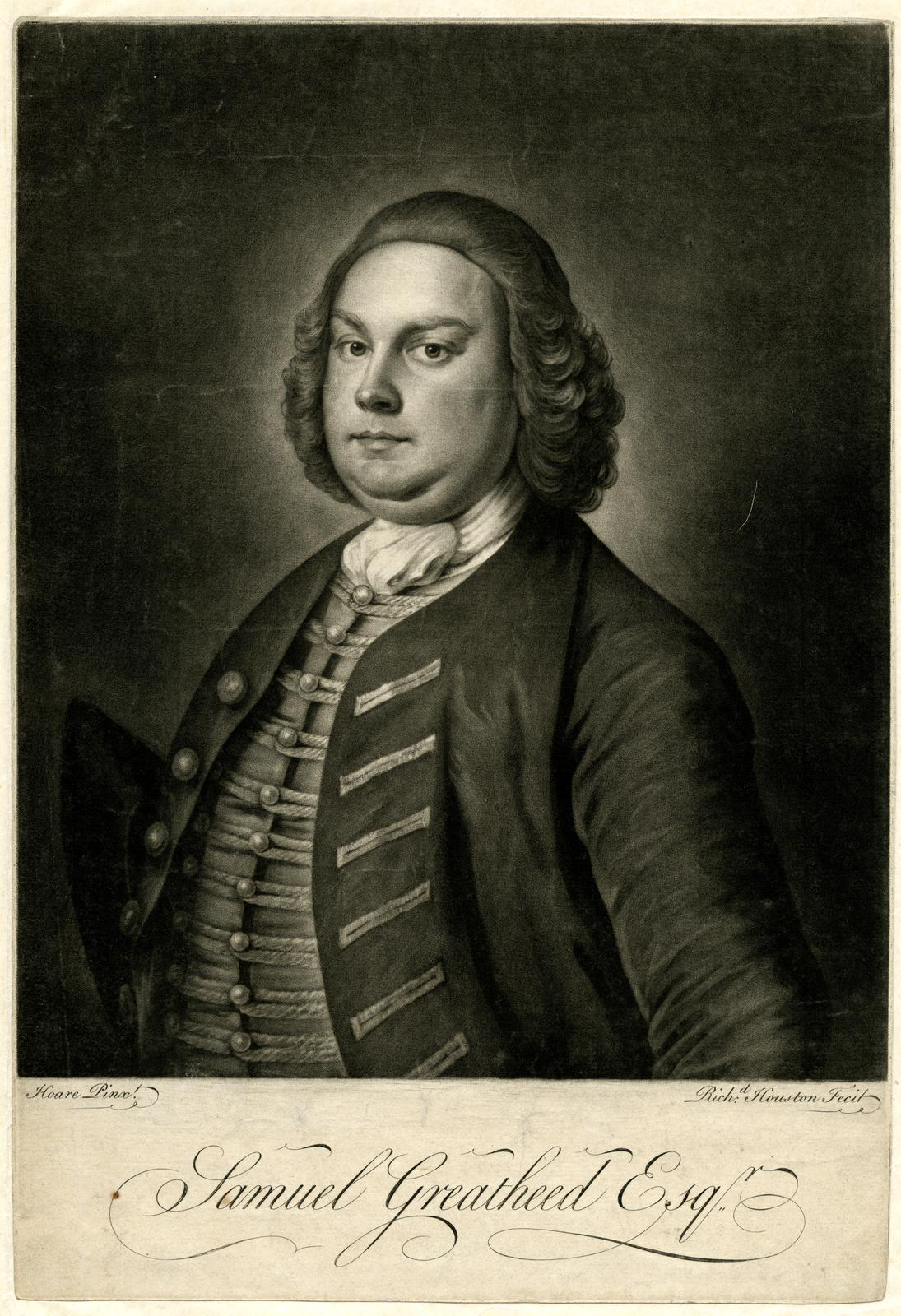
Samuel Greatheed by Richard Houston, after William Hoare

Samuel Greatheed (c. 1710 - 2 August 1765) was a British politician. He was the member of Parliament for Coventry from 1747 to 1761.

Samual Greathead was the son of John Greathead of St Mary Cayon, Saint Kitts, and his wife Frances. The Greathead family probably emigrated to St. Kitts in 1663, after forfeiting their estate near Leeds to the Crown for non-payment of taxes. John Greathead purchased land near the capital, Basseterre, in the early eighteenth century to form what became the Canaries plantation.

Greatheed was sent to the UK in 1718 to stay with his grandfather and was educated in Bradford; at 19 he was admitted to Lincoln's Inn, on 4 April 1730, and Trinity College, Cambridge, on 4 May 1730.

He inherited the St. Kitts plantation on the death of his father in 1739. He remained in the UK, and the estate continued to be managed by his brother, Craister (Christopher) Greatheed until 1772. Samual Greatheed leased Guy's Cliffe in Warwick in 1743, and purchased the property in 1750. He oversaw a programme of improvements at Guy's Cliffe from around 1748 - 1758.

He married Lady Mary Bertie, on 21 February 1747, daughter of Peregrine Bertie, MP, 2nd Duke of Ancaster. They had two sons, Bertie Greathead and Peregrine Francis Greatheed (1748-1766).

In his will, he reaffirmed his marriage settlement which left an annuity of £600 p.a. to his wife Lady Mary secured on his estate and enslaved people in St Kitts. He also left his Saint Kitts property, including people, in trust to support a further annuity of £150 p.a. to his wife and £100 p.a. currency and £100 p.a sterling respectively to his two brothers Marmaduke and Richard. His brother Craister was to manage the plantation at the salary of £200 per annum.
