= John Hewitt (priest, died 1588) =

English Roman Catholic priest and martyr

- Died: 5 October 1588; Mile End Green
- Cause of death: Execution
- Occupation: Priest
- Criminal charges: High treason

See also John Hewitt (disambiguation)

John Hewitt or Hewett (alias Weldon, alias Savell) (date of birth unknown; executed at Mile End Green, 5 October 1588) was an English Roman Catholic priest. He is a Catholic martyr, beatified in 1929.

== Life ==
His father was William Hewett, a draper of York. From Caius College, Cambridge, Hewett passed to the English College, Reims, where, in 1583, he received minor orders.

In the summer of 1585, he went to York(possibly because of ill health), where he was captured and banished in September, reaching Reims once more in November 1585. After his ordination, he set out on 7 January 1586. He used the alias Weldon, and was disguised as the serving man of John Gardiner, Esq. of Grove Place, Buckinghamshire. Sometime prior to March 1587, Hewitt/Weldon was arrested at their lodgings in Gray's Inn and sent to Newgate Prison. There he met Nicholas Horner, a tailor who was imprisoned for having harboured priests. The irons had so injured Horner's leg that it had to be amputated; Hewitt assisted Horner during the procedure.

In October 1588, he was formally arraigned on a charge of obtaining ordination from the See of Rome and entering England to exercise the ministry. He was sentenced to death, and on the following day was taken through the streets of London to Mile End Green, where he was hanged.
