= John Hewitt (priest, born 1755) =

The Hon. John Pratt Hewitt, M.A. (16 December 1755 – 13 May 1804) was an Anglican priest in Ireland in the late 18th and early 19th centuries.

The fourth son of James Hewitt, 1st Viscount Lifford, he matriculated at University College, Oxford in 1773, graduating B.A. in 1776. He then took an M.A. at Trinity College, Dublin in 1778. He was Dean of Cloyne from 1779 until his death.
