= Fred Hewitt =

Australian rules footballer

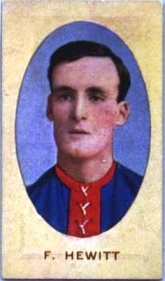

Personal information
- Full name: Frederick Hewitt
- Born: 13 November 1883; Fitzroy, Victoria
- Died: 30 May 1951 (aged 67); Port Melbourne, Victoria
- Original team: Collingwood Juniors

Playing career^{1}
Years	Club	Games (Goals)
1905	Carlton	2 (1)
1908–10	Melbourne	27 (2)
Total		29 (3)
- ^{1} Playing statistics correct to the end of 1910.

Frederick Hewitt (13 November 1883 – 30 May 1951) was an Australian rules footballer who played with Carlton and Melbourne in the Victorian Football League (VFL).
