= Gerry Gilpin =

Rugby union player from Northern Ireland

- Full name: Francis Gerald Gilpin
- Born: 20 October 1940 (age 86) Belfast, Northern Ireland
- University: Queen's University Belfast

Rugby union career
- Position: Fullback / Fly-half
International career
Years	Team	Apps	(Points)
1962	Ireland	3	(0)

Francis Gerald Gilpin (born 20 October 1940) is an Irish former international rugby union player.

Born in Belfast, Gilpin attended Royal Belfast Academical Institution and captained Ulster Schools, then studied economics at Queen's University Belfast, where he was a fly-half on the varsity side.

Gilpin followed two cousins and three uncles in being capped for Ireland, with three appearances during the 1962 Five Nations. His debut, against England at Twickenham, was as a fly-half beside another new cap in 17-year old John Quirke, to form Ireland's youngest ever halfback combination at a combined age of 38. England had a convincing win and Gilpin was discarded from the team, only to be recalled when Tom Kiernan got injured, playing his next two matches at fullback. He was an Ireland reserve the following year as a wing three-quarter.

In 1965, Gilpin found employment in London and earned Middlesex representative honours playing for Harlequins.

== See also ==
- List of Ireland national rugby union players
