= Steven Hewitt (cricketer) =

English cricketer

Personal information
- Full name: Steven Guy Paul Hewitt
- Born: 6 April 1963 (age 63); Radcliffe, Lancashire, England
- Batting: Right-handed
- Role: Wicket-keeper
- Relatives: Simon Hewitt (brother)

Domestic team information
- Years: Team
- 1983–1984: Cambridge University

Career statistics
Competition	First-class
Matches	9
Runs scored	29
Batting average	4.83
100s/50s	–/–
Top score	14*
Catches/stumpings	9/2
- Source: Cricinfo, 1 January 2022

Steven Guy Paul Hewitt (born 6 April 1963) is an English former first-class cricketer.

Hewitt was born at Radcliffe in April 1963 and later studied at Peterhouse, Cambridge. While studying at Cambridge, he played first-class cricket for Cambridge University Cricket Club from 1983 and 1984, making nine appearances. Playing as a wicket-keeper in the Cambridge side, Hewitt scored 29 runs at an average of 4.83 and with a highest score of 26. Behind the stumps he took nine catches and made two stumpings. His elder brother is the Anglo-French cricketer Simon Hewitt, who also played at first-class level.
