= Hewitt baronets =

Baronetcy in the Baronetage of the United Kingdom

The Hewitt Baronetcy, of Barnsley in the West Riding of the County of York, is a title in the Baronetage of the United Kingdom. It was created on 15 January 1921 for Joseph Hewitt.

== Hewitt baronets, of Barnsley (1921) ==
Escutcheon of the Hewitt baronets of Barnsley

- Sir Joseph Hewitt, 1st Baronet (1865–1923)
- Sir Joseph Hewitt, 2nd Baronet (1907–1973)
- Sir Nicholas Charles Joseph Hewitt, 3rd Baronet (born 1947)

The heir apparent is the present holder's son Charles Edward James Hewitt (born 1970).

Colonel Sir Joseph Hewitt, 1st Baronet (14 October 1865 – 8 February 1923) was an English solicitor and coal mine owner.

Hewitt was qualified as a solicitor and later acquired substantial interests in the coal mining industry. He was an adviser to the Coal Controller during the First World War, and for these services he was knighted in 1919 and created a Baronet in the 1921 New Year Honours.[1]

He was commissioned into the 2nd Volunteer Battalion of the York and Lancaster Regiment in 1900. He resigned his commission as a Captain in the 5th Battalion in 1910. In September 1914 he was given command of the Barnsley Battalion of the York and Lancaster Regiment (Barnsley Pals) as a Lieutenant-Colonel. He relinquished command and his commission in November 1915.

== See also ==
- Hewett baronets
