= Frank Hewitt (rugby union) =

Rugby union player from Northern Ireland

- Full name: Francis Seymour Hewitt
- Born: 3 October 1906 Belfast, Ireland
- Notable relative(s): Tom Hewitt (brother); Victor Hewitt (brother); Stanley Hewitt (son); David Hewitt (nephew)

Rugby union career
- Position: Centre / Fly-half
International career
| Years | Team | Apps | (Points) |
| 1924–27 | Ireland | 9 | (6) |

Francis Seymour Hewitt (born 1906) was an Irish international rugby union player.

Born in Belfast, Hewitt attended Royal Belfast Academical Institution and made his Ireland debut as a 17 year old schoolboy in 1924, against Wales at Cardiff. He was the youngest player to debut for Ireland and also formed international rugby's youngest ever sibling combination, with his teenage brother Tom also debuting. Playing as a fly-half, Hewitt scored a try to help Ireland secure victory. He was capped a further eight times, which included a match against the 1924–25 All Blacks. His later appearances were as a centre. He retired from rugby at the end of 1927.

Hewitt's son Stanley played both cricket and rugby union for Ulster.

== See also ==
- List of Ireland national rugby union players
