= Dennis George Wyldbore Hewitt =

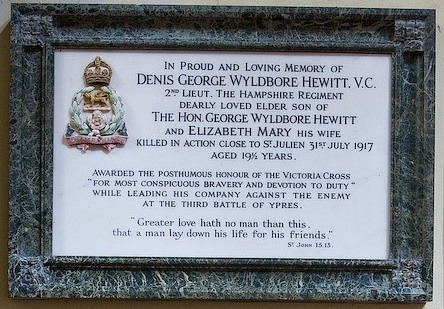
- Memorial plaque in All Saints' Church, Hursley
- Born: 18 December 1897; Mayfair, London
- Died: 31 July 1917 (aged 19); Pilckem Ridge, Passchendaele salient, Belgium
- Burial place: Remembered on the Menin Gate Memorial
- Military career
- Allegiance: United Kingdom
- Branch: British Army
- Rank: Second Lieutenant
- Units: Hampshire Regiment
- Conflicts: World War I: Western Front; Battle of Passchendaele; Battle of Pilckem Ridge †
- Awards: Victoria Cross

Dennis George Wyldbore Hewitt VC (18 December 1897 – 31 July 1917) was an English recipient of the Victoria Cross. He was awarded during an action at Pilckem Ridge at the Battle of Passchendaele.

== Biography ==
Hewitt was the son of Elizabeth Mary née Rampini (1871–1959) and Hon. George Wyldbore Hewitt (1858–1942) – himself a son of James Hewitt, 4th Viscount Lifford. He was born in Mayfair, London and educated at Winchester College. He was 19 years old, and a Second Lieutenant in the 14th Battalion, The Hampshire Regiment (later The Royal Hampshire Regiment), British Army during the First World War when the following deed took place for which he was awarded the VC.

On 31 July 1917 north-east of Ypres, Belgium, at Pilckem Ridge, when his first objective had been captured, Second Lieutenant Hewitt reorganised his company and moved forward. Whilst waiting for the barrage to lift, he was hit by a piece of shell which exploded the signal lights in his haversack and set fire to his equipment and clothes. He extinguished the flames and then, despite his wound and severe pain, he led forward the remnants of the company under a very heavy machine-gun fire and captured and consolidated his objective. He was subsequently killed by a sniper while inspecting the consolidation and encouraging his men.

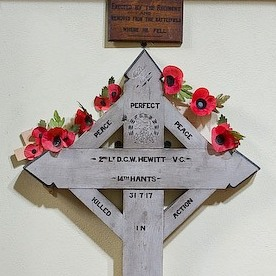
Hewitt's battlefield cross, erected by his regiment though his body was never recovered

He has no known grave and is commemorated on the Menin Gate.
