= Sir Thomas Hewett, 1st Baronet =

English landowner

Sir Thomas Hewett, 1st Baronet (1605 – 4 August 1662) was an English landowner of the Civil War period, who briefly sat in Parliament for Windsor. He made his home at Pishiobury, which he bought in 1635.

Hewett was baptized on 6 October 1605, the eldest son of Sir William Hewett and his wife Elizabeth Wiseman. His father had prospered in business in London and arranged a comprehensive education for Thomas, who attended the Merchant Taylors' School from 1611 to 1612, the Inner Temple in 1618, Eton College from 1619 to 1622, and Sidney Sussex College, Cambridge in 1622. Thomas traveled abroad from 1625 to 1628, when his father's interest as keeper of Windsor Little Park secured him a seat at Windsor. He left no particular mark on that turbulent Parliament which produced the Petition of Right.

On 14 May 1629, he married Frances Hobart (daughter of Sir Henry Hobart of Blickling Hall), who died three years later in May 1632 leaving one daughter. He married again, in about 1633, to Margaret (d. 1 August 1689), the daughter of Sir William Lytton and widow of Thomas Hilldersden. They had five sons and eight daughters, of whom one son, George, and six daughters survived him. These included Elizabeth, wife of Sir Richard Anderson, 2nd Baronet; Arabella, wife of Sir William Wiseman, 2nd Baronet; Margaret, wife of Sir Edward Farmer; Mary, wife of Sir Charles Crofts Read; Anne, wife of Sir John Rivers, 3rd Baronet; and Jane, wife of Charles Staples.

In 1635, he purchased the manor of Sawbridgeworth (Sayesbury and Pishobury) from Lionel Cranfield, 1st Earl of Middlesex, Arthur Brett, and Nicholas Harman for £16,500. He succeeded to his father's estate in 1637, and in the same year became a trustee for Lady Elizabeth, widow of Sir Robert Bevill (d. 1634). In November 1638, he was pricked as Sheriff of Hertfordshire the next year, experiencing difficulty in levying ship money. Hewett was knighted on 10 July 1641 and named a commissioner for the subsidy in Hertfordshire that year. In 1642, he was named to the commission of assessment for the county, and made a commissioner of array and JP, sitting on the Hertfordshire Bench until about 1650.

Hewett took little part in the English Civil War. He was named a commissioner of militia in 1648, and held local offices under Parliament, as a commissioner of assessment for Westminster in 1652 and Hertfordshire from 1657 to 1661. He did not interfere with the persecution of Quakers around Sawbridgeworth under the Commonwealth. Upon the English Restoration, he was created a baronet on 19 July 1660, served as commissioner of militia for the county, and was chosen sheriff of Hertfordshire again in November. Hewett died on 4 August 1662 and was buried at Sawbridgeworth, leaving a portion of £13,000 for his five unmarried daughters.

Parliament of England
Preceded by Sir William Russell; Humphrey Newbery	Member of Parliament for Windsor; 1628–1629; With: William Beecher	Parliament suspended until 1640
Political offices
Preceded by Thomas Coningsby	High Sheriff of Hertfordshire; 1638–1639	Succeeded by John Gore
Honorary titles
Preceded by Robert Dycer	High Sheriff of Hertfordshire; 1660–1661	Succeeded by Henry Blunt
Baronetage of England
New creation	Baronet (of Pishiobury, Hertfordshire); 1660–1662	Succeeded by George Hewett
