= David Hewitt (rugby union, born 1939) =

British & Irish Lions international rugby union player (1939–2026)

- Born: 9 September 1939 Belfast, Northern Ireland
- Died: c. 5 November 2026 (aged 87)
- Notable relative(s): Tom Hewitt (father); Victor Hewitt (uncle); Frank Hewitt (uncle); Stanley Hewitt (cousin)

Rugby union career
- Position: Centre
International career
Years	Team	Apps	(Points)
1958-1965	Ireland	24	(32)
1959, 1962	Lions	6	(16)

David Hewitt (9 September 1939 – c. 5 November 2026) was an Irish rugby union player. Playing at centre, he gained 18 caps for Ireland between 1958 and 1965, in addition to winning six Lions caps in 1959 and 1962.

His father Tom and his uncles Frank and Victor played rugby for Ireland. He was educated at the Royal Belfast Academical Institution, and was captain of the team that won the Ulster Schools' Cup in 1957. He made his provincial debut for Ulster against Connacht the same year, and his international debut for Ireland against Australia in February 1958. He went on his first British and Irish Lions tour to Australia and New Zealand while still in his teens in 1959, and was the tour's top scorer with 13 tries and 112 points. He was also part of the 1962 Lions tour to South Africa. At club level, he played for Queen's University, Instonians and North of Ireland F.C.. He retired from playing at 26 to pursue a career in law. He was inducted into the Guinness Rugby Writers' Hall of Fame in 2015.

In later life, he was a member of the Parades Commission, stepping down from that role in 2000. He died on 5 November 2026 at his home in Holywood, County Down.
