= Machel St Patrick Hewitt =

Jamaican cricket analyst, podcaster, journalist and broadcaster

Machel St Patrick Hewitt is a Jamaican cricket analyst, podcaster, journalist and broadcaster. He is known for his influential role in providing in-depth analysis on the development revolving around Caribbean cricket through Caribbean Cricket Podcast. He serves as a regular host of the Caribbean Cricket Podcast alongside Santokie Nagulendran.

== Biography ==
Machel was born in Jamaica. He was raised up in South London.

== Career ==
His works have frequently appeared in various platforms including BBC, PA Media, Talksport, The Cricketer, Wisden, ESPN Cricinfo, Football League Paper, Cricket8 and The Nightwatchman. He serves as a regular Bromley reporter for the Football League Paper covering club news and updates of Bromley F.C. He also writes and publishes articles for the London-based independent sports media venture, London Football Scene. He also has a commentary stint linked with covering the county cricket for the BBC.

He, alongside Santokie Nagulendran, founded the Caribbean Cricket Podcast. Hewitt and Nagulendran both actively worked by providing content via the Caribbean Cricket Podcast, gaining traction quickly among the fans. Hewitt and Nagulendran both tapped into the 2020 Caribbean Premier League, where they gave previews of all 6 franchise teams ahead of the tournament proper. Following the massive outreach of the Caribbean Cricket Podcast due to its coverage of the 2020 CPL season, the Caribbean Premier League announced a collaborative partnership with Caribbean Cricket Podcast ahead of the 2021 Caribbean Premier League season.

He also consistently uploads content pertaining to the comprehensive, summarized analysis on the current state of affairs in the administration aspect of governing bodies operating in the Caribbean islands through the Caribbean Cricket Podcasts YouTube channel. He also occasionally teams up with Australian cricket writer Jarrod Kimber for podcast discussion about the brain drain in West Indies cricket and the lack of depth in the domestic cricket structure in Caribbean islands.
