= Jackson Hewitt =

US tax preparer

Jackson Hewitt Tax Service, Inc.
- Company type: Private
- Founded: Norfolk, Virginia United States (1982; 44 years ago)
- Headquarters: Jersey City, New Jersey, United States
- Key people: • President and Chief Executive Officer: Greg MacFarlane
- Products: • Financial services • Tax preparation • Refund anticipation loans • Franchises
- Website: jacksonhewitt.com

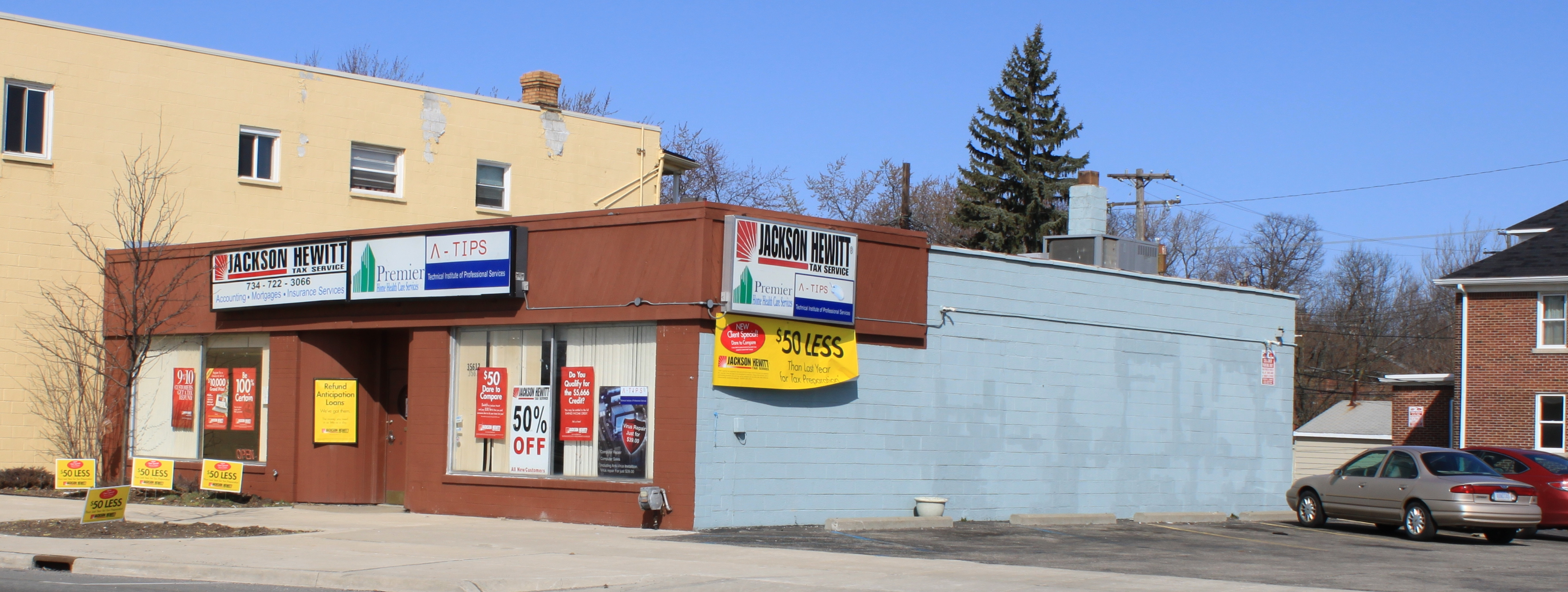
Jackson Hewitt office, Wayne, Michigan.

Jackson Hewitt Tax Service Inc. is the second largest tax-preparation service in the United States; responsible for preparing over 2 million federal, state, and local income-tax returns each year.

The headquarters is located in Jersey City, New Jersey. It operated more than 6,000 franchised and company-owned locations throughout the United States, including nearly 3,000 located in Walmart stores nationwide.

In January 1998, the Cendant Corporation, a consumer conglomerate, purchased Jackson Hewitt in a transaction valued at approximately $480 million. In 2004, Jackson Hewitt Tax Service Inc. was spun off as a separate company.

== History ==
=== Foundation ===
Jackson Hewitt was founded in 1982 by John Hewitt with a variety of investors who purchased the six-location, Norfolk, Virginia-based Mel Jackson's Tax Service and renamed it Jackson Hewitt. For the next few years, the company grew slowly, adding a handful of additional outlets.

=== Expansion ===
In 1986, the same year the Internal Revenue Service first began to experiment with computerized tax filing, the company began selling franchises. By the following tax season there were 22 offices.

In October 1989, the Montgomery Ward department-store chain contracted with Jackson Hewitt to open offices in 169 stores across the United States. For years, Sears – a competitor of Montgomery Ward – had been host to H&R Block in its stores. The sudden growth was too much for the company and to avoid entering bankruptcy during tax season, Jackson Hewitt closed 67 of those offices. However, by the end of 1990, the company had returned to profitability and opened more locations in Montgomery Ward stores.

By 1992, Jackson Hewitt had 515 offices in almost 30 states and was preparing 311,000 returns for taxpayers per year, making it second-largest tax preparation chain in the United States. During the following year, the company raised funds for expansion and moved into new headquarters in Virginia Beach, Virginia. By 1993, the company had 900 offices in 37 states.

In January 1994, the company went public but no new stock was issued; the company's 700 investors' private shares simply converted into public ones. During that same year, the company made a deal to set up offices in Sam's Club stores on a trial basis. The trial was a success, and later that year the company launched plans to establish eighteen offices in Walmart stores, leasing space for use as combined tax preparation and business mail service sites.

=== Cendant ===
In December 1997, Jackson Hewitt announced that it was being acquired by HFS Inc. for $480 million. Before the sale was complete, HFS merged with another firm and changed its name to Cendant Corporation. Cendant owned a number of franchise operations, ranging from Ramada Inn, Days Inn and Avis Car Rental to chains including Coldwell Banker and Century 21.

Under Cendant, Jackson Hewitt opened a total of 1,000 new offices, and started experimenting with kiosk locations in shopping malls and offices at Century 21 real estate agencies.

Following the 1999 tax season, Jackson Hewitt moved its headquarters to Cendant's headquarters in Parsippany, New Jersey, and started acquiring of independent tax preparation offices through its largest franchisee, Tax Services of America.

Starting in 2001, Jackson Hewitt began opening offices in Kmart stores. During that year, the company also introduced the issuance of MasterCard cash cards – so that their customers would have easier access to accelerated refund accounts – as well as the creation of a Premier Tax Service for complex returns. Some Jackson Hewitt locations began to offer ATMs where clients could cash their refund checks on-site. Independent tax-service acquisitions continued throughout the year, with more than 3,300 offices, owned by 600 franchisees.

By year's end, the company was handling over 2.2 million tax returns a year.

At its peak, Jackson Hewitt was the second-largest tax preparation firm in the U.S., a position it still holds. The firm prepared some 3.4 million tax returns for low- and middle-income customers through more than 7,400 franchised company-owned offices, including locations within Kmart, Walmart Stores and mall kiosks.

Jackson Hewitt maintained two business segments: its franchise operations – consisting of its franchise business and associated royalty, marketing-advertising revenue, financial product fees and other revenues and its company owned income tax return preparation offices. During 2008, Jackson Hewitt maintained company-owned offices in 28 markets across the United States and 5,763 franchised offices – responsible for preparing 87 percent of the total number of tax returns prepared by its network.

Jackson Hewitt Inc. operates as a wholly owned subsidiary of Jackson Hewitt. Its company-owned office operations are conducted through a wholly owned subsidiary of Jackson Hewitt Tax Services Inc., Tax Services of America, Inc.

In 2008, the company partnered with the Magic Johnson Foundation to create Community Empowerment Centers that offered comprehensive tax information seminars and financial educational resources in Sacramento, Houston, Chicago, New Orleans and Cleveland. The free seminars offered individuals in underserved communities basic tax information and budget-planning resources. For example, each attendee received free access to the Jackson Hewitt Money Manager, a Web-based home budgeting tool that helps users create and manage a budget and a detailed savings plan.

== Default ==
In May 2009, the company negotiated out of a default on its debt and technically defaulted for several days in May 2010 (although an agreement with creditors was announced within one week of the "default").

On May 4, 2011, the company announced it had agreed to a twenty-day extension of its debt under its various credit agreements with Wachovia/Wells Fargo Bank. The company mentioned at that time that it was considering many options including a prepackaged bankruptcy filing. On May 20, 2011, the extension expired and the company had yet to file for bankruptcy protection or to announce another extension of its debt.

On May 7, 2011, Jackson Hewitt ceased being traded on the New York Stock Exchange. The ending share price was $.19. On May 9, 2011, its stock symbol was changed from JTX to JHTX and began trading on a different stock exchange. On May 24, 2011, Jackson Hewitt officially filed for bankruptcy.

In August 2011, Jackson Hewitt became a privately held company with Philip Sanford as its president, chief executive officer and a member of the board of directors.

== Post-2011 ==
H.I.G. Bayside Capital recapitalized the Company in 2011 and sold the business to Corsair Capital in 2018.

Jackson Hewitt has a strong retail presence and has re-emerged after bankruptcy as the second-largest and fastest growing tax preparation company in America, having been named Vendor of the Year for Walmart. During the 2013 tax season, it expanded its presence into Sears throughout the U.S. and Puerto Rico. on January 7, 2015 Jackson Hewitt unveiled its new brand logo and slogan "Working hard for the hardest working" and the return of refund anticipation loans with 0% interest and no credit check.

== Products and services ==
=== Tax-return preparation ===
Jackson Hewitt provides its customers with tax-return preparation services and electronic filing. Through the use of its tax software, ProFiler, the company provides computerized federal income tax preparation, state income tax, and individual tax preparation services to customers through its brick-and-mortar operations. In 2014, Jackson Hewitt and Tax Preparer Solutions partnered to provide online federal and state preparation and e-filing services through the Jackson Hewitt website.

=== Franchise sales ===
The company supports more than 5,763 franchise locations throughout the United States. Start-up costs range from around $75,000 to $150,000 per franchise. Jackson Hewitt offers support to franchise owners for approved Jackson Hewitt products, software, and computer hardware. The company offers an online Support Center, as well as staff trained to respond to software and technology needs. The online Support Center also provides remote assistance, email, chat and telephone support. Furthermore, in tax year 2005 Jackson Hewitt unveiled its new ESS scan system which enables paperless uploading of customer documents to its secure server.

=== Tax School ===
Jackson Hewitt offers "Tax School" throughout the country with two ways to learn: in a classroom or online, through the University of Phoenix. Jackson Hewitt is an IRS-Approved Continuation Education Provider.
