= Dave Hewitt (writer) =

British writer (1961–2025)

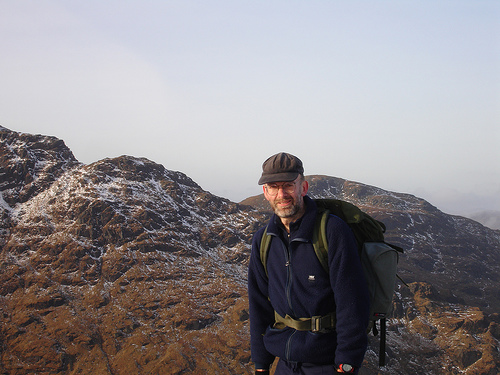
- Hewitt on the Arrochar Alps
- Born: 10 July 1961; Derbyshire, England
- Died: 24 November 2025 (aged 64)
- Occupations: Hillwalker, writer

Dave Hewitt (10 July 1961 – 24 November 2025) was a Scottish hillwalker and writer. He was editor of The Angry Corrie, a hillwalking magazine, as well as editor in chief of TACit Press and author of Walking the Watershed, his account of the first continuous walking of the Scottish watershed, editor of A Bit of Grit on Haystacks, a celebration of the life of Alfred Wainwright, and editor of the Sport and Outdoor sections of the online Scottish newspaper Caledonian Mercury.

Hewitt contributed to the ongoing debates surrounding access to the wild land of Scotland, bagging of hills, conservation issues etc. via radio, the print media and The Angry Corrie. Hewitt finished his round of Munros on The Saddle on 22 July 2007, accompanied by about 50 friends. This was also his 1000th Munro. He had a keen interest in cricket and politics, and was also a competitive chess player, known in Scottish chess for his love of the Trompowsky Attack and his high-risk attack-minded style.

On 25 July 2017, he reached 1712 Munro ascents and 1239 Ben Cleuch ascents (3755 for the 9 Ochil Donald Tops combined). He had completed the Wainwrights. On 28 July 2021, he completed his 1500th ascent of Ben Cleuch.

Hewitt died on 24 November 2025, at the age of 64.
