= Tom Hewitt (rugby union) =

- Full name: Thomas R. Hewitt
- Born: 12 March 1905 Belfast, Ireland
- Died: July 1991 (aged 86) Belfast, Northern Ireland
- Notable relative(s): Frank Hewitt (brother); Victor Hewitt (brother); David Hewitt (son)

Rugby union career
- Position: Three-quarter
International career
Years	Team	Apps	(Points)
1924–26	Ireland	9	(8)

Thomas R. Hewitt (12 March 1905 — July 1991) was an Irish international rugby union player.

Born in Belfast, Hewitt was educated at Royal Belfast Academical Institution and as a cricketer captained Ulster Schools, after which he attended Queen's University Belfast.

Hewitt and his brother Frank made their Ireland debuts as teenagers in the same match, against Wales at Cardiff in 1924, to become the youngest sibling pair to play international rugby. They both scored tries in an Ireland win. He amassed nine caps during his two years in the team, playing as both a centre and wing three-quarter.

A solicitor by profession, Hewitt set up a firm in Belfast in 1930.

== See also ==
- List of Ireland national rugby union players
