= John Hewitt (rugby union, born 1960) =

Rugby union player from Northern Ireland

- Full name: John Arthur Hewitt
- Born: 21 November 1960 (age 65) Carrickfergus, Northern Ireland
- School: Carrickfergus Grammar School
- Occupation: School teacher

Rugby union career
- Position: Centre
International career
| Years | Team | Apps | (Points) |
| 1981 | Ireland | 2 | (0) |

John Arthur Hewitt (born 21 November 1960) is an Irish former international rugby union player.

== Biography ==
A three-quarter from Carrickfergus, Hewitt played his rugby with North of Ireland, London Irish and Ulster.

Hewitt won two Ireland caps on the 1981 tour of South Africa, debuting off the bench against Springboks in the 1st Test at Newlands as a substitute for Ollie Campbell, to form a centre partnership with Ulster teammate David Irwin. He was recalled in 1985 an injury replacement for Ireland's uncapped tour of Japan and the following year represented the Ireland Wolfhounds at the Hong Kong Sevens.

A teacher by profession, Hewitt is formerly a housemaster at Sevenoaks School and headteacher of Sackville School.

== See also ==
- List of Ireland national rugby union players
