= Joseph Hewitt (judge) =

English-born barrister, politician and judge

Joseph Hewitt (1754–1794) was an English-born barrister, politician and judge in late eighteenth-century Ireland.

He was born in Coventry, the third son of James Hewitt, 1st Viscount Lifford and his first wife Mary Rhys Williams, who died in 1765. The family moved to Ireland in 1767 when Joseph's father became Lord Chancellor of Ireland. Despite having the reputation in England of being a mediocre politician and lawyer, Lord Lifford was an outstanding success in Ireland as Lord Chancellor, and was fondly remembered by the Irish legal profession for many years after his death as "the great Lord Lifford". His father's eminence as a judge may have influenced Joseph's decision to pursue a legal career.

He entered the Middle Temple in 1768 and was called to the Irish Bar in 1776. He was appointed cursitor (clerk) of the Court of Chancery (Ireland) in 1782. He became Third Serjeant-at-law (Ireland) in 1787 and Second Serjeant in 1789. His health was never good, and as early as 1785, when he was just over 30, he was wrongly reported to be dying.

He also pursued a career in politics: he failed in his attempt to be elected member of the Irish House of Commons for Carrickfergus in 1782, but was elected as MP for Belfast in 1784. He became a justice of the Court of King's Bench (Ireland) in 1791, but his health had always been bad, and he died only three years later, at the early age of 40. He lived on Grafton Street in Dublin city, and at Newtownpark House, Blackrock, south of Dublin. He never married.

== Sources ==
- Ball, F. Elrington The Judges in Ireland 1221-1921 London John Murray 1926
- Hart, A. R. History of the King's Serjeant at law in Ireland Dublin Four Courts Press 2000
- Lenox-Conyngham, Melosina Diaries of Ireland Lilliput Press 1998
