= Jeff Hewitt (American football) =

American gridiron football player (born 1952)

Profile
- Position: Defensive tackle/Offensive tackle

Personal information
- Born: March 6, 1952 (age 74)
- Listed height: 6 ft 5 in (1.96 m)
- Listed weight: 245 lb (111 kg)

Career information
- High school: Jamesville-DeWitt (DeWitt, New York)
- College: Hamilton
- NFL draft: 1974: undrafted

Career history
- Dallas Cowboys (1974); Calgary Stampeders (1974); Montreal Alouettes (1975)

Jeffrey Cooch Hewitt (born March 6, 1952) is a former offensive tackle and defensive tackle who played in the National Football League. He played college football at Hamilton College.

== College career ==
A graduate of Jamesville-DeWitt High School, Hewitt played college football and track for Hamilton College. He played fullback and defensive tackle on the football team. Hewitt earned College Division honorable mention All-American honors by the Associated Press in 1973. As a senior, he averaged over 10 tackles per games despite being double- and triple-teamed. Hewitt received the Gelas Memorial Prize in 1974 for his outstanding sportsmanship, leadership, character and athletic ability. Despite his individual achievements, Hamilton was winless during his senior year. He earned a degree in psychology.

== Professional career ==
After not being selected in the 1974 NFL draft, Hewitt signed with the Dallas Cowboys. He said he had "an inferiority complex" when he first reported to training camp. Hewitt played 10 games for the Cowboys. He became the first Hamilton alumni to play in the NFL. He was cut by the Cowboys late in the season and was signed by the Calgary Stampeders of the Canadian Football League. In 1975, Hewitt played for the Montreal Alouettes, after being acquired by the Stampeders.

== Post-football career ==
After his football career, Hewitt earned a master's degree from Colgate University and taught at Central Texas College.
