= James Hewitt, 4th Viscount Lifford =

James Hewitt, 4th Viscount Lifford, DL (31 March 1811 – 20 November 1887), of Meenglass Castle, near Stranorlar in County Donegal, was Deputy Lieutenant for the County of Donegal.

== Early life and family ==
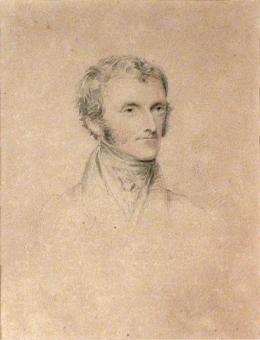
Lord Lifford's father, The 3rd Viscount Lifford.

He was born on 31 March 1811 at Merrion Square, Dublin, as the son of James Hewitt, 3rd Viscount Lifford, and the Hon. Mary Ann Maude.

He married Lady Mary Acheson, daughter of The 2nd Earl of Gosford and Mary Sparrow, on 9 July 1835. The children from this marriage were:

- Mary Anne Hewitt (d. 27 May 1913), married John Gathorne Wood, son of John Wood
- Isabella Hewitt (d. 19 Mar 1924)
- James Wilfrid Hewitt, 5th Viscount Lifford (12 Oct 1837 – 20 Mar 1913)
- Evelyn John Hewitt (19 Jul 1842 – 4 Jul 1867)
- Archibald Robert Hewitt, 6th Viscount Lifford (14 Jan 1844 – 22 May 1925)
- Cornwallis Charles Hewitt (3 Mar 1847 – 4 Sep 1889)
- Edward Hewitt (31 Mar 1848 – 4 Sep 1931)

Lady Mary died in March 1850.

Secondly, he married Lydia Lucy Wingfield Digby, daughter of the Reverend John Digby Wingfield Digby, on 9 December 1851. The children from this marriage were:

- William James Hewitt (6 Apr 1856 – 28 Oct 1948)
- George Wyldbore Hewitt (16 Nov 1858 – 23 Apr 1924), who married Elizabeth Mary Rampini (1871–1959); one of their two sons was Second Lieutenant Dennis George Wyldbore Hewitt, V.C.
- Lettice Lucy Hewitt (d. 13 Aug 1930)
- Alice Anne Hewitt (d. 11 Feb 1943)
- Georgiana Rosamund Hewitt (c 1858 – 9 May 1887)
- Anne Eliza Hewitt (d. 5 Sep 1957)

== Career ==
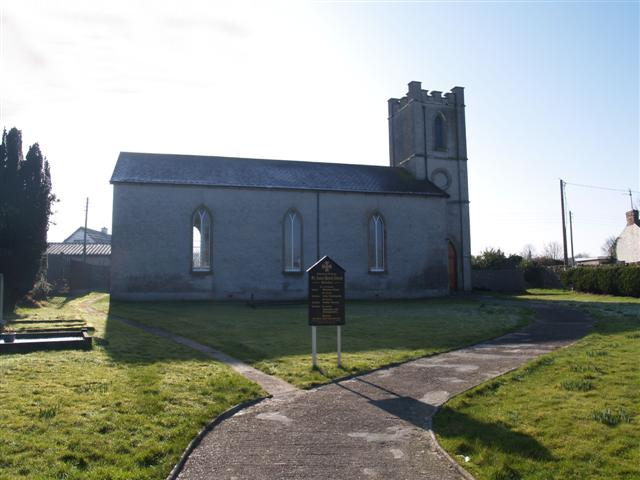
St. Anne's Church of Ireland Church, Monnellan, The Cross, Killygordon, the burial place of James, 4th Viscount Lifford.

He was educated at Christ Church, Oxford. His estates comprised 11,000 acres at Meenglas, Ballybofey. He was Deputy Lieutenant of County Donegal, and he was High Sheriff of Donegal from 1841 to 1845.

He was Chairman of the Finn Valley Railway around 1860. He sat in the House of Lords as an Irish representative peer from 1856 to 1887, sitting on the Conservative benches.

Lord Lifford died on 20 November 1887. He is buried in St Anne's Church of Ireland Church, Monnellan, The Cross (also known as Crossroads), Killygordon.

== Publications ==
- Ireland and the Irish Church (1842)
- Thoughts on the Present State of Ireland (1849)
- A Plea for Irish Landlords (1867)

Political offices
Preceded by The Viscount de Vesci	Representative peer for Ireland; 1856–1887	Succeeded by The Earl of Wicklow
Peerage of Ireland
Preceded by James Hewitt	Viscount Lifford; 1855–1887	Succeeded by James Hewitt
