= Hewet baronets =

Extinct baronetcy in the Baronetage of England

- Escutcheon of the Hewet baronets of Headley Hall
- Creation date: 1621
- Status: extinct
- Extinction date: 1822
- Seats: Headley Hall, Yorkshire

The Hewet Baronetcy, of Headley Hall in the County of York, was a title in the Baronetage of England. It was created on 11 October 1621 for John Hewet. The title became extinct on the death of the eighth Baronet in 1822.

The Viscounts Hewett were members of another branch of this family.

== Hewet baronets, of Headley Hall (1621) ==
- Sir John Hewet, 1st Baronet (c. 1598–1657)
- Sir John Hewet, 2nd Baronet (died 1684)
- Sir John Hewet, 3rd Baronet (died 1737)
- Sir William Hewet, 4th Baronet (died 1749)
- Sir William Hewet, 5th Baronet (died 1761)
- Sir Tyrrell Hewet, 6th Baronet (died 1770)
- Sir Byng Hewet, 7th Baronet (c. 1752 – c. 1770)
- Sir Thomas Hewet, 8th Baronet (c. 1756–1822)

== See also ==
- Viscount Hewett
