= James Hewitt, 1st Viscount Lifford =

Anglo-Irish politician, lawyer and judge

The Right Honourable The Viscount Lifford PC (Ire)
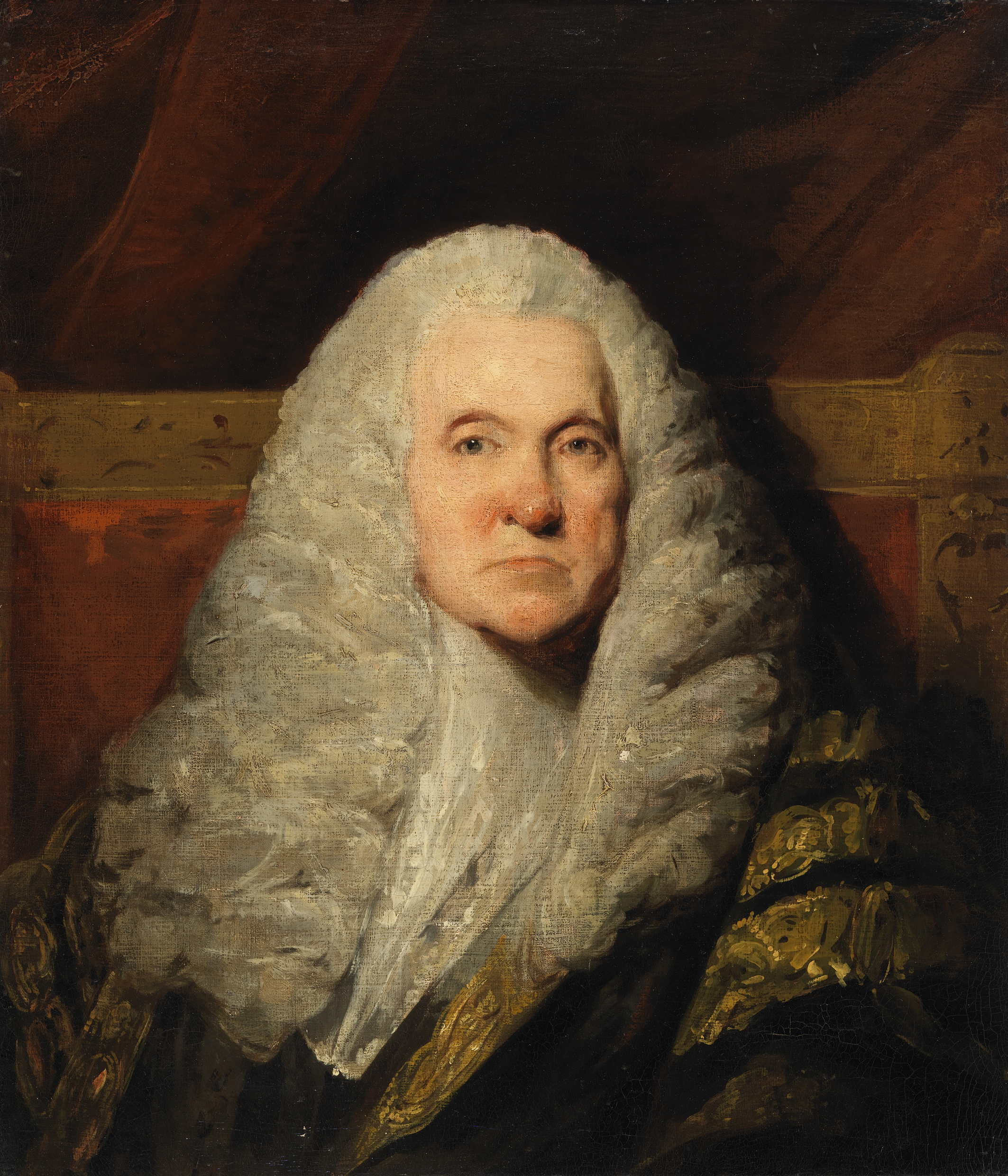
- Lord Lifford.

Lord Chancellor of Ireland
- In office 24 November 1767 – 28 April 1789
- Monarch: George III
- Preceded by: The Lord Bowes
- Succeeded by: John FitzGibbon

Member of Parliament for Coventry
- In office 1761–1766 Serving with Andrew Archer
- Preceded by: William Grove; Samuel Greatheed
- Succeeded by: Henry Seymour-Conway; Andrew Archer

Personal details
- Born: 1712
- Died: 1789 (aged 77)
- Spouse: Mary Rhys Williams (m. 1749; died 1765) Ambrosia Bayley (m. 1749–1789)
- Children: 7, including James and Joseph
- Profession: Lawyer, politician

James Hewitt, 1st Viscount Lifford (28 April 1712 – 28 April 1789), was an Anglo-Irish politician, lawyer and judge. He served as Lord Chancellor of Ireland from 1767 to 1789.

== Early life ==
Hewitt was the son of a Coventry draper, William Hewitt (1683–1747), who was born in Rockcliffe, Cumberland, the son of James Hewitt and Mary Urwin. The judge's mother was Hannah Lewis. In a class-conscious age, his background was something of a handicap, and his "small-town" manners were the subject of unkind comments throughout his life. Hewitt used his influence with the first Rockingham ministry to secure office for his brother, William Hewitt (1719–1781), as a commissioner for the sale of ceded lands in the British West Indies.

== Career ==
Hewitt first worked as an attorney's clerk. By 1742, he had become a barrister. Rising quickly through the legal profession, his career climaxed when he was made Lord Chancellor of Ireland in 1767, a post he held until his death in 1789. He was raised to the Peerage of Ireland as Baron Lifford, of Lifford in the County of Donegal, in 1768, and was further honoured when he was made Viscount Lifford in 1781, also in the Irish peerage.

He was elected Member of Parliament (MP) for Coventry for 1761 to 1766. He was not highly regarded as a parliamentarian; his fellow MPs complained that his speeches were almost inaudible.

== Character and reputation ==
Lord Lifford made his reputation as Lord Chancellor of Ireland: until then he had the name of being a "dull, heavy lawyer", an uninspiring though "safe" MP, and a man of mediocre intelligence, who was painfully conscious of his rather humble origins. Even the government which chose him, while praising him as a good lawyer and an honest man, was rather doubtful that he had the necessary strength of character to be an effective Lord Chancellor, while the English Bench reacted to his appointment with general ridicule.

They were quickly proved wrong: within two years of his arrival in Ireland, Lord Lifford was earning the highest praises as a judge. As his colleague in the Irish government John Hely-Hutchinson (not a man normally given to speaking well of others) wrote to a friend:

"He does his business very ably and expeditiously and to the general satisfaction of suitors and practicers in this country, where he is much respected and a very popular character and is, in his public and private deportment, a most worthy, honest amiable man."

His efficiency in doing business was such that it was said that virtually all equity litigation in his time was diverted to Chancery (this may have been partly because the Court of Exchequer, which had a competing equity jurisdiction, was notoriously slow and inefficient; it had been described earlier in the century as being in a state of "confusion and disorder beyond remedy").

Barristers who practised in his court, like John Philpot Curran, fondly recalled "the great Lord Lifford" after his death, and cited him as a model for other judges to follow.

== Personal life ==
Lord Lifford married firstly Mary Rhys Williams, daughter of the Rev. Rhys (or Price) Williams of Stapleford Abbotts, Essex, Archdeacon of Carmarthen, in 1749, by whom he had four sons: James (1750–1830; his heir), William (1752–1798), Joseph (1754–1794), justice of the Court of King's Bench, and John (1756–1804), Dean of Cloyne. Mary died in 1765. His second wife was Ambrosia Bayley, daughter of the Rev. Charles Bayley of Navestock and Elizabeth Beck, whom he married in 1766: her youth and beauty aroused much admiration in Ireland. By Ambrosia, he had one further son and two daughters. He was succeeded by his eldest son, James, who succeeded him in his titles. Ambrosia died in 1807.

He lived at Belvidere House in Drumcondra, Dublin, and later Stillorgan.

== Arms ==
Coat of arms of James Hewitt, 1st Viscount Lifford
Crest On a stump of a tree, with one branch growing thereon, an owl Proper. Escutcheon Gules a chevron engrailed between three owls Argent. Supporters Dexter: A vulture Proper wings inverted gorged with a plain collar Sable thereon three bezants; Sinister: A griffin Proper wings elevated gorged as the dexter. Motto Be Just And Fear Not

Political offices
Preceded by The Lord Bowes	Lord Chancellor of Ireland; 1767–1789	In commission Title next held by The Lord Fitzgibbon
Parliament of Great Britain
Preceded by William Grove; Samuel Greatheed	Member of Parliament for Coventry; 1761–1766; With: Andrew Archer	Succeeded by Henry Seymour-Conway; Andrew Archer
Peerage of Ireland
New creation	Viscount Lifford; 1781–1789	Succeeded by James Hewitt
New creation	Baron Lifford; 1768–1789	Succeeded by James Hewitt
