= Mark Alan Hewitt =

American architect

Mark Alan Hewitt (born March 31, 1953) is an American architect, preservationist and architectural historian, known for his work on architectural history and the history of architectural drawing "as a medium of thought."

== Biography ==
Born in Berwyn, Illinois, Hewitt attended Sammamish High School in Bellevue, Washington, graduating in 1971. He went to Yale University to study acting and English literature, but after taking a class with architectural historian Vincent Scully, changed his major to architecture. After graduating from Yale in 1975, he pursued a Master of Architecture degree at the University of Pennsylvania, studying with Allan Greenberg, Robert A.M. Stern, David Van Zanten, and Steven Izenour.

After graduating from Penn in 1978, Hewitt apprenticed for two years with the architecture firm Venturi, Rauch and Scott Brown. While there, he taught a studio at Penn with architect Steve Izenour called Beach, Boardwalk and Boulevard: The Built Environment of Atlantic City, NJ that later became an exhibition at the Cooper-Hewitt Museum in New York.

Hewitt has taught architecture and historic preservation at Rice University, Columbia University, New Jersey Institute of Technology, and, most recently, as a visiting faculty member at Rutgers University.

Hewitt was the recipient of an NEH Fellowship at the Winterthur Museum in 1996, and was honored with the Arthur Ross Award in 2009 for his writing on classical architecture. He lives and practices in Sutton, New Hampshire.

Hewitt is a Fellow of the American Institute of Architects. He sings with a number of choral and a cappella groups, including Ridge Light Opera, the Alumni of the Yale Russian Chorus, and Harmonium: A Classical Choral Society.

== Work ==
Hewitt's research and writing has addressed American architecture and architects from 1880 to 1940, American country houses and domestic architecture, classical architecture and treatises on the orders, the work of Gustav Stickley, and architectural conservation. His latest research, on the neuroscience of design, resulted in the publication of the first cognitive history of architectural design in 2020.

Hewitt currently practices architecture under the name Mark Alan Hewitt Architects. The firm primarily addresses historic preservation and residential architecture with projects including restoration and renovation, new additions and some entirely new buildings.

== Selected publications ==
- Hewitt, Mark Alan, The Architect and the American Country House, 1890-1940 Yale University Press, New Haven and London, 1990. ISBN 978-0-300-04740-0
- Hewitt, Mark Alan, Architecture of Mott B. Schmidt, Rizzoli, New York 1991, ISBN 978-0-8478-1399-5
- Hewitt, Mark Alan, Gustav Stickley's Craftsman Farms: The Quest for an Arts and Crafts Utopia, Syracuse University Press, Syracuse NY, 2001, ISBN 978-0-8156-0689-5
- Hewitt, Mark Alan, and Bock, Gordon (co-authors), The Vintage House: A Guide to Successful Renovations and Additions, W.W. Norton, New York, 2011, ISBN 978-0-393-70619-2
- Hewitt, Mark Alan, Lemos, Kate, Morrison, William and Warren, Charles D. (co-authors), Carrere & Hastings, Architects, Acanthus Press, 2006, ISBN 978-0-926494-42-8
- Hewitt, Mark Alan, Kennedy-Grant, Philip, Mills, Michael J. (co-authors), AIA New Jersey Guidebook: 150 Best Buildings and Places, Rutgers University Press, 2011, ISBN 978-0-8135-5126-5
- Hewitt, Mark Alan, Draw In Order To See: A Cognitive History of Architectural Design, Oro Editions, San Francisco, 2020, ISBN 978-1-943532-83-4

Articles, a selection

- Hewitt, Mark. "Representational Forms and Modes of Conception; an Approach to the History of Architectural Drawing." Journal of Architectural Education 39.2 (1985): 2-9.
- Hewitt, Mark A. "The Imaginary Mountain: The Significance of Contour in Alvar Aalto's Sketches." Perspecta (1989): 163-177.
- Hewitt, Mark Alan. "Architecture for a contingent environment." Journal of Architectural Education 47.4 (1994): 197-209.
- Hewitt, Mark Alan. "Sketches as Cognitive Traces: Aalto at Imatra." New Design Ideas 2.1 (2019): 1-20.

== Filmography ==
=== Television ===
| Year | TV Series | Role | Notes |
|---|---|---|---|
| 2021 | Drive By History | Himself | Episode 5.03 |
