= Martin Hewitt (adventurer) =

Adventurer, businessman and former Captain in the Parachute Regiment (born 1980)

Martin Hewitt (born 1980 in Widnes, Cheshire) is a mountaineer, businessman and former Captain in the Parachute Regiment. He is most notable for his attempts to be the first to complete the Explorers Grand Slam with a team of disabled mountaineers. He is also known for his appearances on the BBC TV programme Harry's Arctic Heroes. Hewitt spent eight years as a commissioned officer in the Parachute Regiment. He was mentioned in dispatches in 2006 during his first tour of Afghanistan. Whilst leading a platoon attack in Helmand Province, Afghanistan in 2007 on his second tour of duty he received gunshot wounds to the chest and foot from a 7.62 calibre machine-gun fired by insurgents. This resulted in his right arm becoming permanently paralysed. Forced to quit active service with the British Army, Hewitt turned his mind to disabled sport and mountaineering. After forming and captaining the first Combined Services Disabled Ski Team, he went on to represent Great Britain in the Paralympic World Championships competing in downhill ski racing.

- In 2011 he walked unsupported to the Geographic North Pole joined by Prince Harry as part of the Walking With The Wounded team.
- In 2012 he summited Denali (also called Mount McKinley) in Alaska. Later that year he made his first attempt at climbing Mount Everest, again as part of the Walking With The Wounded team. However, treacherous conditions forced the team to abandon their attempt before reaching the summit.
- Hewitt is currently leading the Adaptive Grand Slam team on its attempt to be the first disabled team to reach the North and South Poles and to scale the highest mountain on all seven continents. As of November 2021, the North Pole, Denali (North America) and Mount Elbrus (Europe), Mt Aconcagua (South America), Mt Kilimanjaro (Africa) and Mt Everest (Asia) had been summited and the team were about to head to Antarctica to walk unsupported to the Geographic South Pole followed by a summit attempt of Mt Vinson.
