= Tony Hewitt =

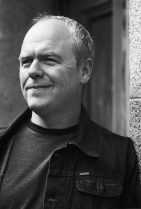

Background information
- Also known as: DJ Tony, Anthony Hewitt
- Origin: Manchester, England
- Genres: House music
- Occupations: Record producer, DJ
- Years active: 1991–present

Tony Hewitt is a British house music DJ and producer.
