= John Hewitt (rugby union, born 1928) =

Rugby union player from Northern Ireland

- Full name: William John Hewitt
- Born: 6 June 1928 Belfast, County Antrim, Ireland
- Died: 15 May 2019 (aged 90) Belfast, County Antrim, Ireland
- Notable relative: Stanley Hewitt (brother)

Rugby union career
- Position: Out-half
International career
| Years | Team | Apps | (Points) |
| 1954–61 | Ireland | 4 | (0) |

William John Hewitt (6 June 1928 — 15 May 2019) was an Irish international rugby union player.

== Biography ==
Hewitt was born in Belfast and learned his rugby at the Royal Belfast Academical Institution, where he was a member of the 1945 Ulster Schools' Cup-winning side. He played his rugby club for Instonians.

An out-half, Hewitt had limited opportunities for Ireland due to the presence of Jack Kyle and was capped four times between 1954 and 1961, with two of his appearances coming as a wing three-quarter. He was a member of Ireland's 1952 tour of South America and earned his final cap against the Springboks in Cape Town on the 1961 South African tour.

== See also ==
- List of Ireland national rugby union players
