= John Hewitt (antiquary) =

English antiquarian

John Hewitt (1807–1878) was an English antiquarian.

== Life ==
Born at Lichfield, he studied music in youth, and was for some time organist of St. Mary's Church there. Subsequently he was appointed to a post in the War Office. It brought him into the Tower of London. He worked under Robert Porrett, was encouraged to take an interest in the national collection of arms and armour there, and produced a pioneering guide. While living in London was well known in literary society. He enjoyed the friendship of Bulwer Lytton, Mary Howitt, Anna Maria Hall, Allan Cunningham, Leigh Hunt, and others.

For many years he resided at Woolwich, but on his retirement from the War Office he returned to Lichfield, where he died on 10 January 1878.

== Works ==
Hewitt contributed to many periodicals as a young man. He used the pseudonym Sylvanus Swanquill. His works include:

- ‘The Tower [of London]: its History, Armories, and Antiquities: before and since the Fire,’ London, 1841, published by the authority of the master-general and board of ordnance. It went through several editions in English, French, and Spanish.
- ‘Chart of Ancient Armour from ye XI to ye XVII cent.,’ with descriptions of the figures in the chart [London, 1847].
- ‘Ancient Armour and Weapons in Europe: from the Iron period of the Northern nations to the end of the [seventeenth] century,’ 3 vols., London, 1855–60.
- ‘Official Catalogue of the Tower Armories,’ London, 1859.
- ‘Old Woolwich,’ 1860, published by the Royal Artillery Association.
- ‘Handbook for the City of Lichfield and its Neighbourhood,’ Lichfield, 1874; 2nd edit. 1884.
- ‘Handbook of Lichfield Cathedral,’ 1875; 3rd edit., enlarged by the Dean of Lichfield (E. Bickersteth), Lichfield, 1886.
- An enlarged edition of Charles Alfred Stothard's ‘Monumental Effigies,’ London, 1876.
- Numerous contributions to the Archæological Journal and The Reliquary, including a series of papers in the latter on Mediæval Arms and Armour.
