= Joe Hewitt (footballer, born 1902) =

English footballer

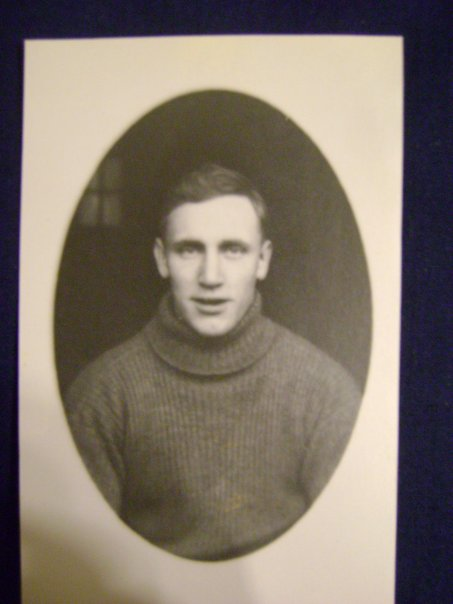

Joseph Hewitt (born 1902) was an English professional football goalkeeper.

Born in Coventry, Warwickshire, Hewitt started his career in local football in the Coventry area. He joined Watford, of the Football League Third Division South, in September 1927. He made his debut two months later, replacing the injured Bill Yates for an away match against Millwall on 5 November 1927; Watford lost 4–2. He briefly lost his place later that month, but played in Watford's final 26 fixtures of 1927–28, and missed only two games the following season. He shared the position with other keepers for his final two seasons at Vicarage Road, and made his final appearance on 2 May 1931, keeping a clean sheet in a 1–0 win at Norwich City. He left Watford shortly thereafter, to join Coventry City.
