= Judi Hewitt =

Ecologist and statistician

- Education: Åbo Akademi University
- Scientific career
- Fields: benthic ecology, statistics
- Workplaces: NIWA, University of Auckland
- Thesis: Using multi-scale spatial and temporal information to explain soft-sediment macrofaunal heterogeneity (2003)
- Website: https://www.niwa.co.nz/users/hewitt

Judith Elaine Hewitt is a Finnish-New Zealand bio-statistician and soft-sediment benthic ecologist. She currently works at the National Institute of Water and Atmospheric Research, and have with an association with the University of Auckland.

== Academic career ==
After a 2003 PhD at the Swedish-language Åbo Akademi University titled 'Using multi-scale spatial and temporal information to explain soft-sediment macrofaunal heterogeneity,' Hewitt joined staff at National Institute of Water and Atmospheric Research, rising to principal scientist.

In 2016 Hewitt was made a Fellow of the Royal Society of New Zealand. Also in 2016 Hewitt was awarded the New Zealand Marine Sciences Society Award in recognition of her "significant contribution to the understanding of the role of scale in ecology and using advanced statistics to address challenging ecological questions".

== Selected works ==
- Thrush, S. F., J. E. Hewitt, V. J. Cummings, P. K. Dayton, M. Cryer, S. J. Turner, G. A. Funnell, R. G. Budd, C. J. Milburn, and M. R. Wilkinson. "Disturbance of the marine benthic habitat by commercial fishing: impacts at the scale of the fishery." Ecological applications 8, no. 3 (1998): 866–879.
- Turner, Stephanie J., S. F. Thrush, J. E. Hewitt, V. J. Cummings, and G. Funnell. "Fishing impacts and the degradation or loss of habitat structure." Fisheries Management and Ecology 6, no. 5 (1999): 401–420.
- Thrush, S. F., J. E. Hewitt, V. J. Cummings, J. I. Ellis, C. Hatton, A. Lohrer, and A. Norkko. "Muddy waters: elevating sediment input to coastal and estuarine habitats." Frontiers in Ecology and the Environment 2, no. 6 (2004): 299–306.
- Thrush, S. F., R. B. Whitlatch, R. D. Pridmore, J. E. Hewitt, V. J. Cummings, and M. R. Wilkinson. "Scale‐dependent recolonization: the role of sediment stability in a dynamic sandflat habitat." Ecology 77, no. 8 (1996): 2472–2487.
- Thrush, Simon F., Judi E. Hewitt, Vonda J. Cummings, and Paul K. Dayton. "The impact of habitat disturbance by scallop dredging on marine benthic communities: what can be predicted from the results of experiments?." Marine Ecology Progress Series (1995): 141–150.
