= James Hewitt, 2nd Viscount Lifford =

Anglo-Irish peer and clergyman

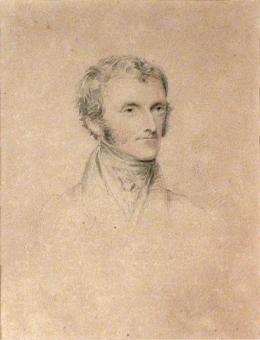
Hewitt's son, James, who became The 3rd Viscount Lifford

James Hewitt, 2nd Viscount Lifford (27 October 1750 – 15 April 1830), was an Anglo-Irish peer and Church of Ireland clergyman.

Hewitt was the eldest son of James Hewitt, 1st Viscount Lifford, and his first wife Mary Rhys Williams. The Hewitt family came originally from Coventry: James' father was sent to Ireland in 1767 as Lord Chancellor of Ireland. Despite much criticism of his appointment, he proved to be an outstanding success in the office, and for many years afterwards, he was fondly remembered by the Irish Bar as "the great Lord Lifford". Mary died in 1765, and her widower in the following year remarried Ambrosia Bayley, a noted beauty who became very popular in Ireland. The younger James was educated at Trinity College, Dublin and Christ Church, Oxford.

On 28 September 1789, he succeeded to his father's titles and assumed his seat in the Irish House of Lords. He was Dean of Armagh between 1796 and his death in 1830.

== Marriages, children, & succession ==
He married, firstly, Henrietta Judith Pomeroy, daughter of Arthur Pomeroy, 1st Viscount Harberton and Mary Colley, on 25 July 1776. She died just two years later, and Hewitt married Alicia Oliver on 23 December 1781. Together they had two children. He was succeeded by his eldest son, also called James.

Peerage of Ireland
Preceded by James Hewitt	Viscount Lifford; 1789–1830	Succeeded by James Hewitt
