= Marty Hewitt =

English footballer

Personal information
- Full name: Martin Hewitt
- Date of birth: 24 July 1965 (age 61)
- Place of birth: Hartlepool, England
- Position: Centre forward

Senior career*
Years	Team	Apps	(Gls)
- St. James'
1986–1987	Hartlepool United	14	(2)
1987–1991	Billingham Synthonia	74	(35)
- * Club domestic league appearances and goals

Martin Hewitt (born 24 July 1965) is an English former professional footballer who played as a centre forward.

== Career ==
Born in Hartlepool, Hewitt played for St. James', Hartlepool United and Billingham Synthonia.

== Personal life ==
His son died in a car accident in October 2014.
