= Richard Hewitt (cricketer) =

Australian cricketer

Personal information
- Born: 13 February 1844; Beverley, Yorkshire, England
- Died: 21 March 1920 (aged 76); Granville, New South Wales, Australia
- Source: ESPNcricinfo, 31 December 2016

Richard Hewitt (13 February 1844 – 21 March 1920) was an Australian cricketer. He played eight first-class matches for New South Wales between 1865/66 and 1872/73.

== See also ==
- List of New South Wales representative cricketers
