= Anthony Hewitt (pianist) =

British musician (born 1971)

Anthony Hewitt (born in 1971) is a classical pianist from the Lake District, England.

Described by The Gramophone as "a remarkably gifted artist", and by Alfred Brendel as "a young pianist of remarkable talent", Hewitt now combines his busy concert schedule with the duties of directing the Ulverston International Music Festival.
