= Sir Joseph Hewitt, 1st Baronet =

English solicitor and coal mine owner (1865-1923)

Colonel Sir Joseph Hewitt Bt
- Born: 14 October 1865
- Died: 8 February 1923 (aged 57)
- Occupations: Solicitor, coal owner

Colonel Sir Joseph Hewitt, 1st Baronet (14 October 1865 – 8 February 1923) was an English solicitor and coal mine owner.

Hewitt was born in humble circumstances, but qualified as a solicitor and later acquired substantial interests in the coal mining industry. He was an adviser to the Coal Controller during the First World War, and for these services he was knighted in 1919 and created a baronet in the 1921 New Year Honours.

He was commissioned into the 2nd Volunteer Battalion, York and Lancaster Regiment, in 1900. He resigned his commission as a captain in the 5th Battalion in 1910. On the outbreak of World War I in August 1914 he was active in recruiting for Kitchener's Army, for example making a half-time speech at the match between Barnsley F.C. and Grimsby Town F.C. at Oakwell football ground on Saturday 19 September, which attracted numerous recruits. He was instrumental in raising two battalions of 'Barnsley Pals', and in September was given command of the 13th (Service) Battalion, York and Lancaster Regiment (1st Barnsley) with the rank of lieutenant-colonel. After training the battalion he relinquished the command in November 1915 when he was graded medically unfit for overseas service, and joined the Coal Commission.

== Footnotes ==
Baronetage of the United Kingdom
New creation	Baronet (of Barnsley); 1921–1923	Succeeded by Joseph Hewitt
