= Richard Thornton Hewitt =

- Born: 1917
- Died: 1994 (aged 76–77)
- Military career
- Allegiance: United Kingdom
- Branch: British Army
- Service years: 1939–1945
- Rank: Lieutenant-Colonel
- Service number: 134681
- Units: Cheshire Regiment; Special Operations Executive
- Commands: Commander of Allied No 1 Special Forces in the Italian Campaign
- Conflicts: Second World War

Lieutenant-Colonel Richard Thornton Hewitt OBE (1917–1994) was a distinguished British Army officer in World War II, and subsequently held senior positions in the Royal Society of Medicine in both London and New York.

== Biography ==
Born on 19 January 1917, he attended King's School in Macclesfield and in 1936 won an exhibition scholarship to Magdalene College, Cambridge, and graduated in 1946.

He commanded the Allied No 1 Special Forces in the Italian Campaign in World War II. During his tenure British SOE and SAS forces together with partisans launched daring and successful attacks against German Nazi military units in northern Italy.

After the war he was appointed secretary of the Royal Society of Medicine in London in 1952 and he held the post, under the new title of executive director, until 1982.

He exercised a major influence on the development of the Society during those years, giving priority to securing its financial position and acquiring accommodation into which it could expand.

— Dr Penelope Hunting, History of the Royal Society of Medicine

He was a founder and vice-president of the Royal Society of Medicine in New York.

There is a 'Hewitt Room' in the Royal Society of Medicine in London which also makes an annual Richard T. Hewitt Award, and the US Society awards an annual Richard T. Hewitt Medal.

== Honours and awards ==
He was made OBE in 1945 and a Freeman of the City of London in 1954, and gained further honours later in life from Middle Temple, the Swedish Medical Society, Chelsea College and the Worshipful Society of Apothecaries of London.
