= John Hewitt (entrepreneur) =

American businessman (born 1949)

John T. Hewitt
- Born: 1949 (age 76–77); Detroit, Michigan, United States
- Education: University at Buffalo
- Occupation: Businessman
- Known for: Founder of Liberty Tax Service and pioneer in tax preparation software

John T. Hewitt (born 1949) is an American businessman who is the co-founder of Jackson Hewitt, founder of Liberty Tax Service, and CEO of ATAX. Between 1998 and 2017, Hewitt was CEO, chairman and president of Liberty Tax. Hewitt was a pioneer in the development and use of specialized tax-preparation software, which became the industry's standard practice.

== Early life and education ==
Hewitt is a native of Detroit, Michigan. His parents moved to Greece, New York when he was four, and then to Hamburg, New York when he was 14. He graduated from Hamburg High School prior to enrolling at the University at Buffalo.

== Career ==
=== Early career with H&R Block ===
Hewitt began his career in 1969, leaving the University of Buffalo early to become a tax preparer with H&R Block. He quickly moved through the ranks of the organization, becoming an assistant district manager for Western New York and then a district manager for the areas of Elmira, Corning, and Ithaca. By 1980, he was the youngest regional director at H&R Block, running over 250 offices.

Hewitt perceived a need for technological innovation within the tax industry and he left H&R Block in order to pursue that opportunity. Working alongside his father, he pioneered the development of decision-tree tax-preparation software. H&R Block was uninterested in the software, leading Hewitt to found a tax-preparation service that would exploit the efficiency of electronic tax preparation.

=== Jackson Hewitt ===
In August 1982, in Hampton Roads, Virginia, Hewitt and other investors acquired the six offices of a local tax-preparation company, Mel Jackson Tax Service. They launched the "Hewtax" interview program, the first of its kind in the industry, that had been developed with his father. In 1988, the company changed its name to Jackson Hewitt. By 1986, the IRS began testing an electronic filing process, allowing taxpayers to directly file their taxes, bypassing mailing of returns entirely, benefiting Jackson Hewitt and other providers of electronically produced tax forms. Also in 1986, Jackson Hewitt began offering franchises in the United States.

According to Inc. Magazine, by 1992, Jackson Hewitt had attained a second place ranking within its industry and was one of the fastest growing private companies in the United States. The company became public in 1994. When it was sold for $483 million in 1997, it was operating 1,345 offices.

=== Liberty Tax Service ===
John Hewitt had left Jackson Hewitt at the time of its acquisition, and was contractually barred from competing with the company until 2000 within most areas of the United States. In order to avoid infringing on the terms of his non-compete contract, Hewitt initially focused the company's operations in Canada, purchasing the Canadian tax company U&R Tax Depot in 1997 In 1998, the company was renamed Liberty Tax Service and expanded its operations in to the United States.

Hewitt was terminated as CEO in September of 2017. Liberty Tax had reported poor financial performance and was forced to close down dozens of its offices due to allegations of tax fraud. An investigation by New York-based law firm Skadden, Arps, Slate, Meagher & Flom led to a lawsuit which alleged that he had sex in his office with numerous employees and hired relatives of female employees with whom he had had romantic relationships. The lawsuit was settled with no findings of wrongdoing on Hewitt's part.

During Hewitt's tenure at Liberty Tax Service, he wrote and published the book iCompete: How My Extraordinary Strategy for Winning Can Be Yours (2016, ISBN 9781682610077) through Post Hill Press's Savio Republic imprint.

=== Loyalty Brands ===
John Hewitt founded Loyalty Brands in 2018. This is an umbrella franchise company that manages twelve brands. Loyalty Brands manages operational and sales aspects for the brands. Some of the brands are wholly owned by Loyalty Brands, including ATAX Tax Service, Ledgers Accounting, Little Medical School, Zoomin Groomin Mobile Pet Spa, and Loyalty Business Brokers.

In 2020, Liberty Tax sued Hewitt claiming that Loyalty Brands was competing against Liberty Tax using confidential and proprietary information acquired during his time leading Liberty.

== Recognition ==
- International Franchise Association Entrepreneur of the Year (2005)
- Accounting Today Top 100 Most Influential People (2006)
- Ernst & Young Virginia Entrepreneur of the Year (2003)
