= Stanley Hewitt =

Irish cricketer

Personal information
- Full name: Francis Stanley Arnot Hewitt
- Born: 13 March 1936; Belfast, Northern Ireland
- Died: 14 August 2001 (aged 65); Belfast, Northern Ireland
- Batting: Right-handed
- Bowling: Right-arm off break Right-arm fast-medium

Domestic team information
- Years: Team
- 1966: Ireland

Career statistics
Competition	First-class
Matches	1
Runs scored	53
Batting average	26.50
100s/50s	–/–
Top score	36
Balls bowled	48
Wickets	0
Bowling average	–
5 wickets in innings	–
10 wickets in match	–
Best bowling	–
Catches/stumpings	1/–
- Source: Cricinfo, 3 January 2022

Francis Stanley Arnot Hewitt (13 March 1936 in Belfast, Northern Ireland – 14 August 2001 in Belfast) was an Irish cricketer and rugby union player. In cricket, he was a right-handed batsman and right-arm fast-medium and off spin bowler, he played three times for the Ireland cricket team between 1955 and 1966, including one first-class match against Scotland. In rugby, he played centre and fullback for Instonians and Ulster.

== Playing career ==
Hewitt made his debut for Ireland in 1955, playing against the MCC at Lord's. He took 2/59 in the MCC's first innings, his best bowling figures for Ireland. He did not play for Ireland again until July 1966, when he returned to the side for a game against Middlesex, before his only first-class match against Scotland. He scored 36, his highest score, in that match but did not play again for Ireland.

== Statistics ==
In all matches for Ireland, he scored 58 runs at an average of 9.67 and took four wickets at an average of 51.75.
