= Buffalo Bulls =

Intercollegiate sports teams of the University at Buffalo

- University: University at Buffalo
- Nickname: Bulls
- NCAA: Division I (FBS)
- Conference: Mid-American
- Athletic director: Mark Alnutt
- Location: Buffalo, New York
- Football stadium: Broadview Stadium (football, soccer)
- Basketball arena: Broadview Arena
- Colors: Royal blue and white
- Mascot: Victor E. Bull
- Fight song: Victory March
- Website: ubbulls.com
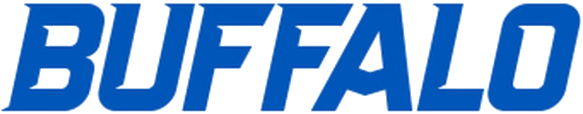

The Buffalo Bulls are the intercollegiate athletic teams that represent the University at Buffalo (UB) in Buffalo, New York. The Bulls compete in the National Collegiate Athletic Association (NCAA) at the Division I level as a member of Mid-American Conference (MAC) East Division, having joined the conference in 1998. Buffalo sponsors teams in seven men's and nine women's NCAA sanctioned sports. The football team competes in the Football Bowl Subdivision (FBS), the highest level for college football.

The mascot of UB athletic teams is Victor E. Bull.

== History ==
The first half of Buffalo's color scheme of blue and white was implemented in 1886 when Buffalo's medical school began tying its diplomas using blue ribbons. Later, its pharmacy school began tying its diplomas using white ribbons to distinguish itself from the medical school. Those colors were adopted as Buffalo's official colors as the university grew and added more departments. Internally, Buffalo refers to its shade of royal blue as "UB Blue" and its shade of white as "Hayes Hall White."

Buffalo's athletic history predates the foundation of the NCAA. In 1894, a group of medical students at what was then known as the University of Buffalo formed the University of Buffalo Athletic Association and organized its first football team. A baseball team also represented Buffalo since at least 1894, according to an article in the Buffalo Evening News from October 1895 which mentioned that the previous year's team would be reorganized. Before the close of the century, a hockey and track and field team were also formed.

In 1903, the school's athletics program was canceled due to lack of funding. In 1905, during the period of inactivity, a men's basketball team began play, although it was not officially sponsored by the school.

Buffalo's intercollegiate sports program returned in 1915.

Buffalo's sports teams were known as the "Buffalo Bisons" until 1931, at which point they changed their name to the Bulls to avoid confusion with several professional sports teams of the same name. However, the "Bulls" moniker had been used by local newspapers as early as 1923. In 1960, the Buffalo Bills began play in the American Football League. Their similar names would lead to decades of brand confusion. In 1997, Buffalo's women's teams changed their names to the Bulls from the "Buffalo Royals".

Buffalo joined the State University of New York Athletic Conference (SUNYAC) in the 1978–79 academic year.

In 1986, the State University of New York approved university president Steven Sample's request to elevate the school's sports from NCAA Division III to NCAA Division I within an estimated five to seven years. At the time, the expectation was that UB would play football in NCAA Division I-AA. The school joined Division I-AA in 1993 and Division I-A in 1999.

In 1997, Buffalo introduced Victor E. Bull, its new mascot, a student in a blue, anthropomorphic bull costume. The mascot was named by a student write-in contest in the school's newspaper, The Spectrum. He replaced a brown, anthropomorphic bull named "Woody Bully."

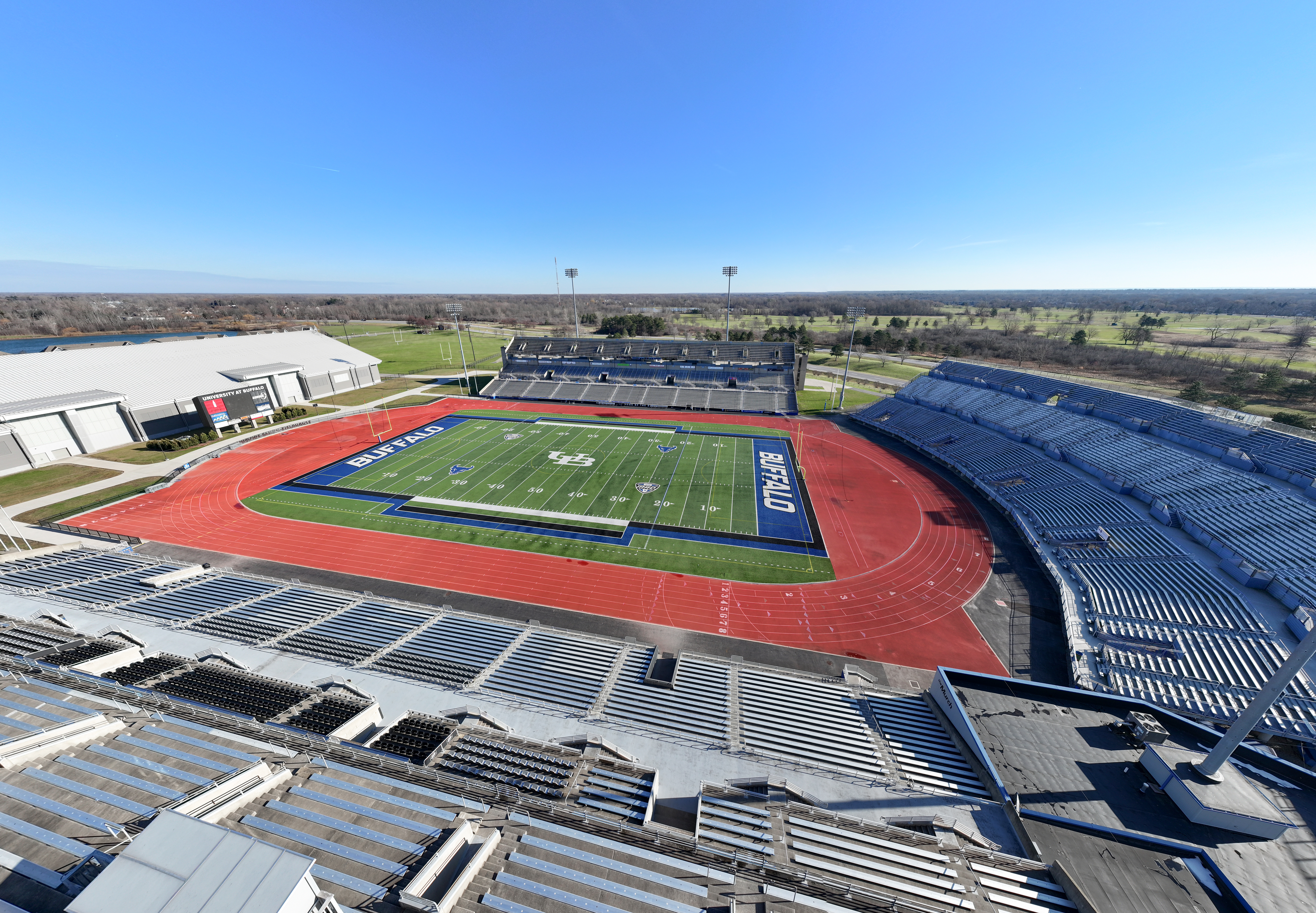
Broadview Stadium, used for most outdoor athletics, in December 2023

In 2013, under Athletic Director Danny White, Buffalo rebranded in such a way as to "expand and enhance the visibility of UB's athletic teams in New York State and nationwide." The rebranding capitalized on its status in the State University of New York system and included wordmarks featuring the formal "State University of New York at Buffalo" name in which "New York" was emphasized in more prominent letters. The basketball court at Broadview Arena and turf at Broadview Stadium also featured silhouettes of New York State. In April 2016, following the departure of Danny White, the school announced it would revert to Buffalo-focused branding.

Following the 2016–17 academic year, Buffalo eliminated its baseball, men's soccer, men's swimming and diving and women's rowing programs. The university, then under the direction of president Satish K. Tripathi and athletic director Allen Greene, estimated the measure would save the school $2 million while maintaining the number of teams at sixteen, the minimum amount necessary to maintain membership in Division I.

== Championships ==
=== National championships ===
==== Individual ====
Association	Division	Sport	Year	Event	Individual(s)	Score
NCAA	Division I	Men's outdoor track and field	2015	Shot put	Jonathan Jones	20.78 m
NCAA	Division III	Wrestling	1986	167 lbs.	Steve Klein	7–2
NCAA	Division III	Wrestling	1980	118 lbs.	Tom Jacoutot	Fall (7:48)

==== Team ====
Association	Division	Sport	Year	Team	Score
NCAA	Division III	Wrestling	1978	Buffalo Bulls wrestling	91 3/4

=== Conference championships ===
Sports	Conference	Year	Titles
Baseball	SUNYAC	1980	1
Men's basketball	SUNYAC	1982	1
Men's basketball	MAC	2015, 2016, 2018, 2019	4
Women's basketball	ECC	1992, 1994	2
Women's basketball	MAC	2016, 2019, 2022	3
Football	MAC	2008	1
Men's golf	SUNYAC	1980	1
Women's soccer	MAC	2014, 2022	2
Softball	SUNYAC	1985	1
Men's swimming & diving	SUNYAC	1987	1
Men's swimming & diving	ECC	1992, 1994	2
Men's swimming & diving	Mid-Continent	1995	1
Men's swimming & diving	MAC	2011	1
Women's swimming & diving	SUNYAC	1987	1
Women's swimming & diving	Mid-Continent	1995, 1996, 1997, 1998	4
Women's swimming & diving	MAC	2021	1
Men's outdoor track and field	SUNYAC	1967	1
Women's indoor track and field	SUNYAC	1987	1
Men's tennis	SUNYAC	1987	1
Men's tennis	MAC	2015, 2017, 2025, 2026	4
Women's tennis	MAC	2008, 2017, 2018, 2025	4
Wrestling	SUNYAC	1987	1
SUNYAC Championships:			10
ECC Championships:			4
Mid-Continent Championships:			5
MAC Championships:			20
Total Championships:			39

== Sports sponsored ==
Buffalo is a member of the Mid-American Conference

Men's sports	Women's sports
Basketball	Basketball
Cross country	Cross country
Football	Soccer
Tennis	Softball
Track and field^{1}	Swimming and diving
Wrestling	Tennis
	Track and field^{1}
	Volleyball
^{1} – includes both indoor and outdoor

=== Basketball ===
==== Men's basketball ====
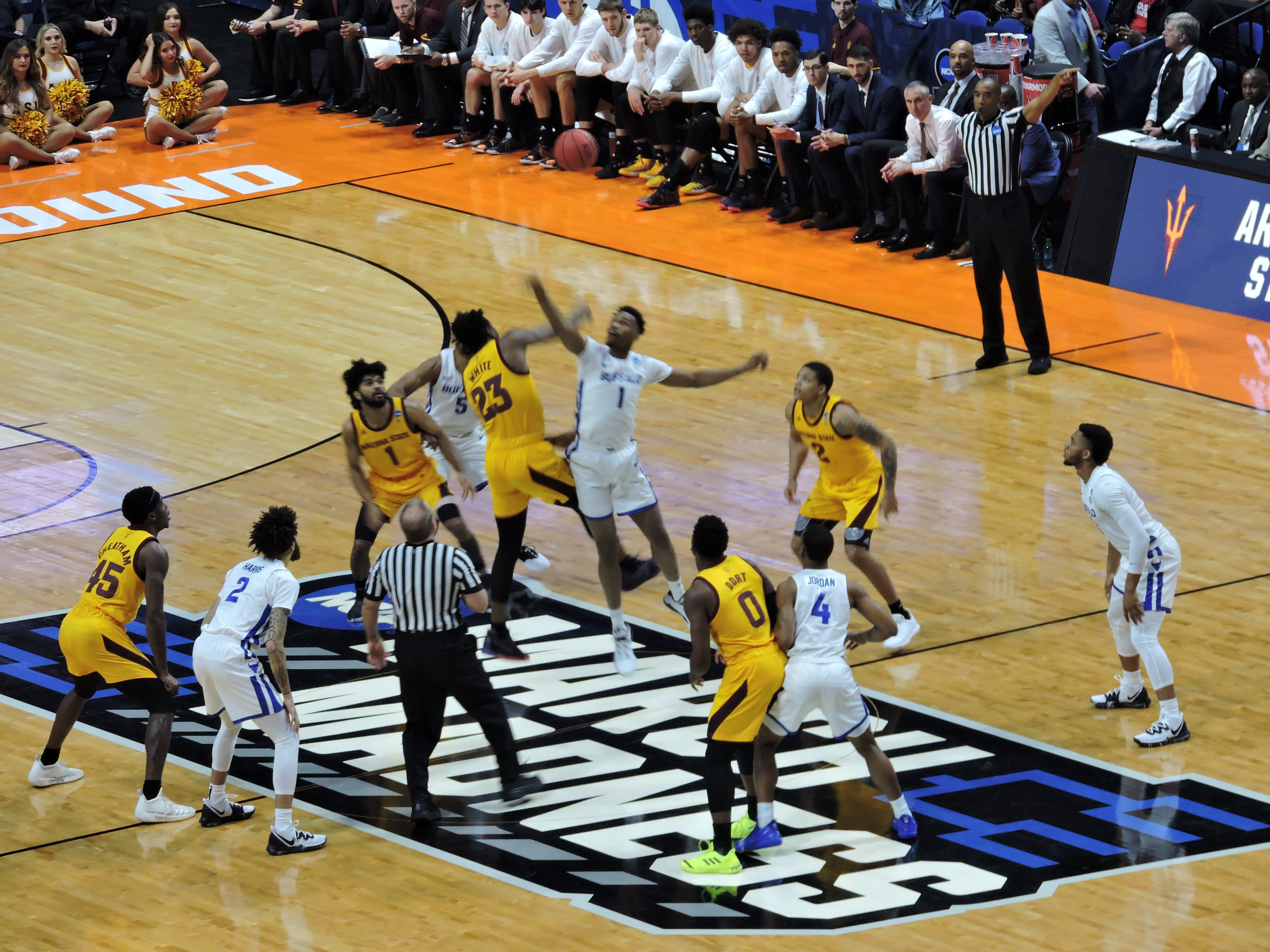
Buffalo tips off against Arizona State in the 2019 NCAA Division I men's basketball tournament.

The Buffalo Bulls men's basketball team has been a member of Division I since the mid-1990s after dropping to the Division III level for the 1977–1978 season.

In their 2004–2005 campaign, led by senior guard Turner Battle (who was hired as a Buffalo assistant coach in 2007), the Bulls went on a run to the Mid-American Conference Championship game, beating Western Michigan in the semifinals at Gund Arena in Cleveland. In the MAC final, despite leading by 17 at the half, the Bulls lost in overtime to Ohio University on a tip-in by Leon Williams with 0.5 seconds remaining. The Bulls failed to clinch the automatic bid to the 2005 NCAA Division I men's basketball tournament, and were not chosen by the selection committee on Selection Sunday. They then went to the National Invitation Tournament (NIT). During that season, the Bulls were led by Coach Reggie Witherspoon, and ended the season with a school record of 23 wins.

The 2014–15 Bulls team, under second-year coach Bobby Hurley, won its first conference championship and clinched its first trip to the NCAA Division I men's basketball tournament in the school's history. The 2015–16 team, under rookie coach Nate Oats, repeated as MAC championships, making their second trip in a row to the NCAA tournament. In 2018, the program made the NCAA tournament for the third time in four years and upset no. 4 seed Arizona in the First round, marking its first win in a Division I tournament game in school history. In the following season the team was ranked in the Associated Press' top-25 poll for the first time ever after beating fourteenth-ranked West Virginia in West Virginia.

Sam Pellom played in the NBA with the Atlanta Hawks and Milwaukee Bucks. He also played for the Washington Generals in a game against the Harlem Globetrotters before making it to the NBA.

In 2022, Blue Collar U, a team consisting mainly of UB alumni, won The Basketball Tournament, a summer professional full-court tournament with a $1 million winner-take-all purse. Former Bulls star C. J. Massinburg was named tournament MVP.

==== Women's basketball ====
Felisha Legette-Jack was hired as the women's basketball head coach on June 14, 2012, making her the first coaching hire made by Athletic Director Danny White.

In 2016 the women's basketball team won the MAC tournament and made their first trip to the NCAA tournament in program history. In 2018, the team made another trip to the NCAA tournament, beating South Florida in the first round and Florida State in the second round, reaching the Sweet Sixteen for the first time in program history.

=== Cross country ===
==== Men's cross country ====
In November 2013, Zach Ahart won the MAC men's individual championship race with a time of 24:47.60. He was the first MAC cross country champion in school history. As of 2021, no Buffalo men's runner had matched that feat.

==== Women's cross country ====
In 2012, UB hosted the MAC championships. They were also scheduled to host the NCAA Regional meet in the 2017 season.

=== Football ===
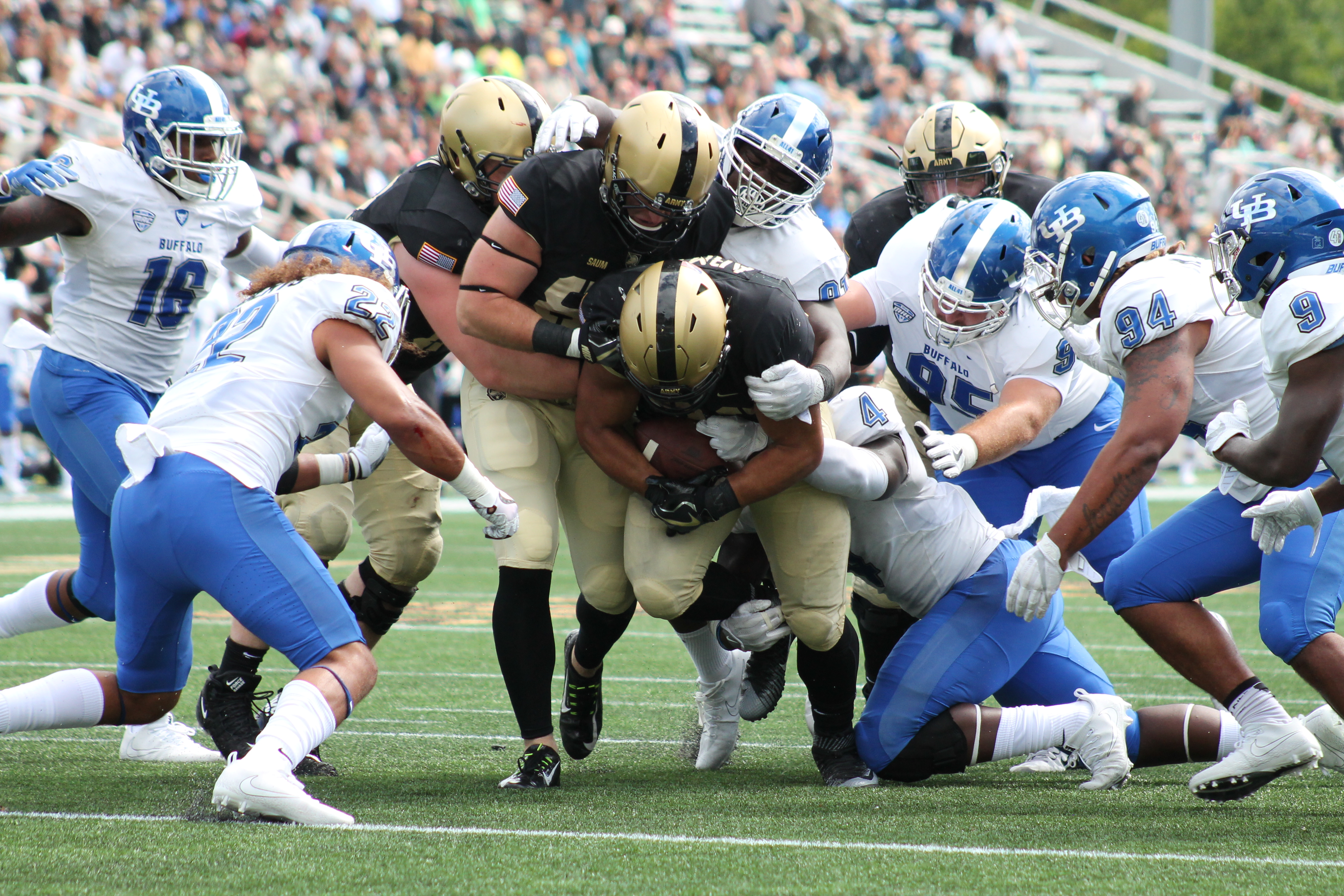
Buffalo defenders converge on an Army ball carrier during a 2017 game

The Buffalo Bulls football team is a member of the Division I Football Bowl Subdivision, having joined in 1998.

In 2003, the Bulls were 6–39 since going to Division I-A. At that time, they were ranked 117, and were coached by Jim Hofher. The Bulls averaged just under 11,250 fans per game in 2003. Five years later, in 2008, the Buffalo Bulls routed the previously ranked and unbeaten Ball State Cardinals 42–24, capturing their first Mid-American Conference Championship. In that game, two fumbles were returned for touchdowns. The final game of the 2008 campaign was against the University of Connecticut in the 2009 International Bowl on January 3, 2009, at the Rogers Centre in Toronto, Ontario. In that game, the Bulls lost with a score of 38–20.

==== Selected notable professional football players ====
- Shaun Dolac
- Ed Ellis
- Ramon Guzman
- Tyree Jackson
- Khalil Mack
- Steven Means
- Branden Oliver
- Jaret Patterson
- Gerry Philbin
- Jamey Richard
- Naaman Roosevelt
- Trevor Scott
- Kristjan Sokoli
- James Starks
- John Stofa
- Josh Thomas
- Drew Willy

In 2014, outside linebacker Khalil Mack was drafted by the Oakland Raiders fifth overall in the 2014 NFL draft making him the highest selected Bulls player ever. Previously, the highest selected player was Gerry Philbin in 1964. Mack set the all-time NCAA record for forced fumbles and is also tied for career tackles for loss in the NCAA. In 2015, Mack became the first first-team All-Pro in NFL history to be elected in two different positions in the same year, as a defensive end and outside linebacker. Mack was named the NFL Defensive Player of the Year for the 2016 season.

=== Soccer ===
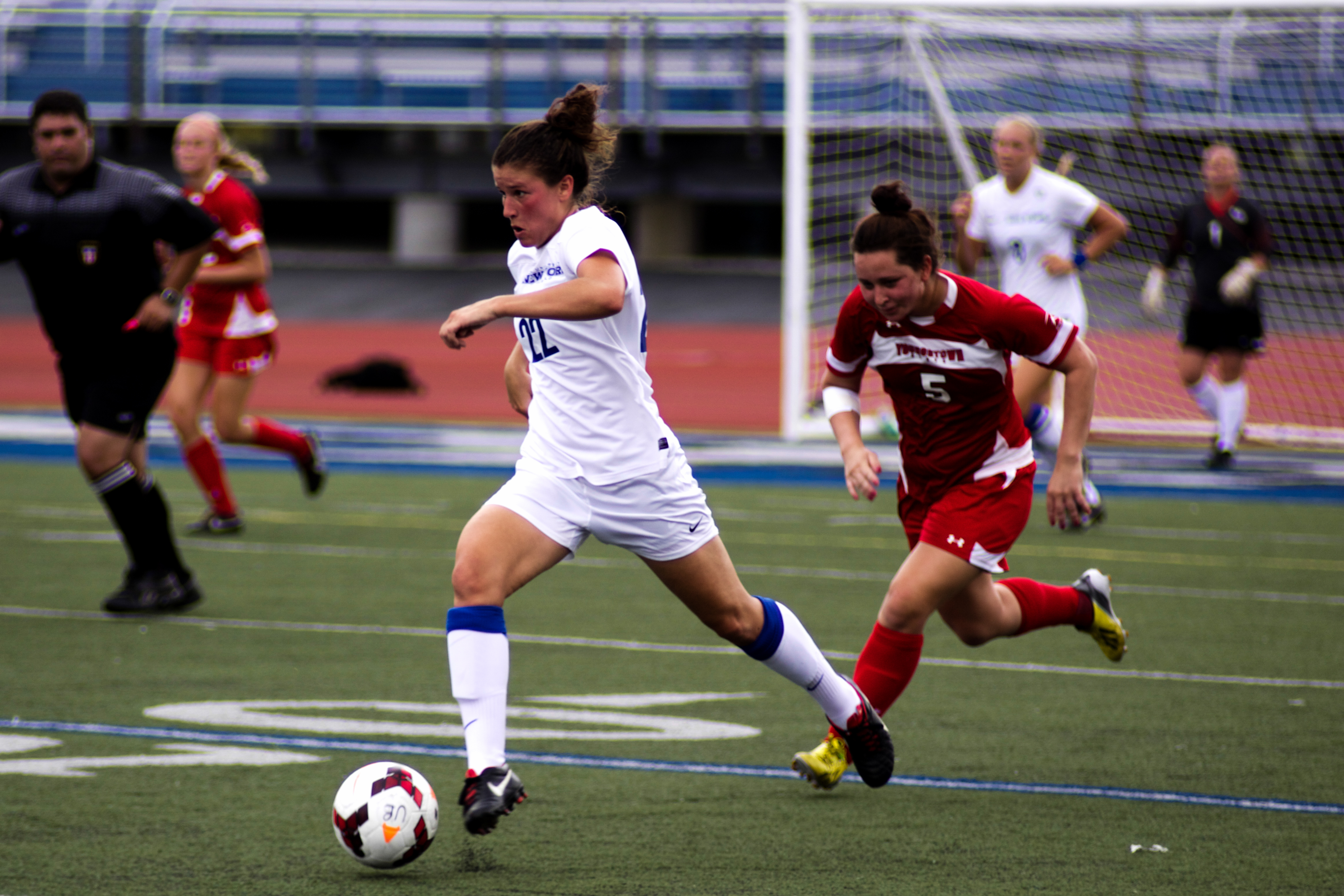
The Buffalo women's soccer team plays against Youngstown State in 2013

The UB women's soccer team won a regular season MAC title in 2000. In 2014, a program record was set with fourteen straight victories including their first conference championship in a game over Western Michigan. Buffalo also earned its first berth in the NCAA Division I Women's Soccer Tournament.

In 2020, the MAC elected to discontinue the Mid-American Conference women's soccer tournament in order to save money and instead send the leading team in each division to a conference championship game. As a result, in 2021, Buffalo was not given a chance to play for the conference championship despite finishing with the most wins (a 6–1–1 record) and the highest rating percentage index in the MAC East. Bowling Green finished first in the MAC East with a record of only 5–1; because of the COVID-19 pandemic, Bowling Green's season was put on pause and they played two fewer games than Buffalo and four fewer games than some other MAC teams. The Bulls team was outraged by the outcome. The tournament would return in 2021 with a revised format and the Bulls would go on to win their second conference championship in 2022.

The men's soccer program was discontinued in 2017.

=== Softball ===
As of 2021, the Bulls softball program has a record of 317–704–1 in Division I and 131–288–1 in conference games.

In 2014, Buffalo made it to the finals of the MAC softball tournament but was shut out by Ohio.

=== Swimming and diving ===
The Bulls women's swimming and diving team won four consecutive Mid-Continent Conference championships between 1995 and 1998. As of April 2026, no other Buffalo team has won even three consecutive conference championships.

Kristen Maines was hired as the women's head coach on August 23, 2012.

The men's swimming and diving program was discontinued in 2017.

Buffalo's women's swimming and diving won its first MAC championship in 2021. A program-record ten swimmers earned all-conference honors.

=== Tennis ===
==== Men's tennis ====
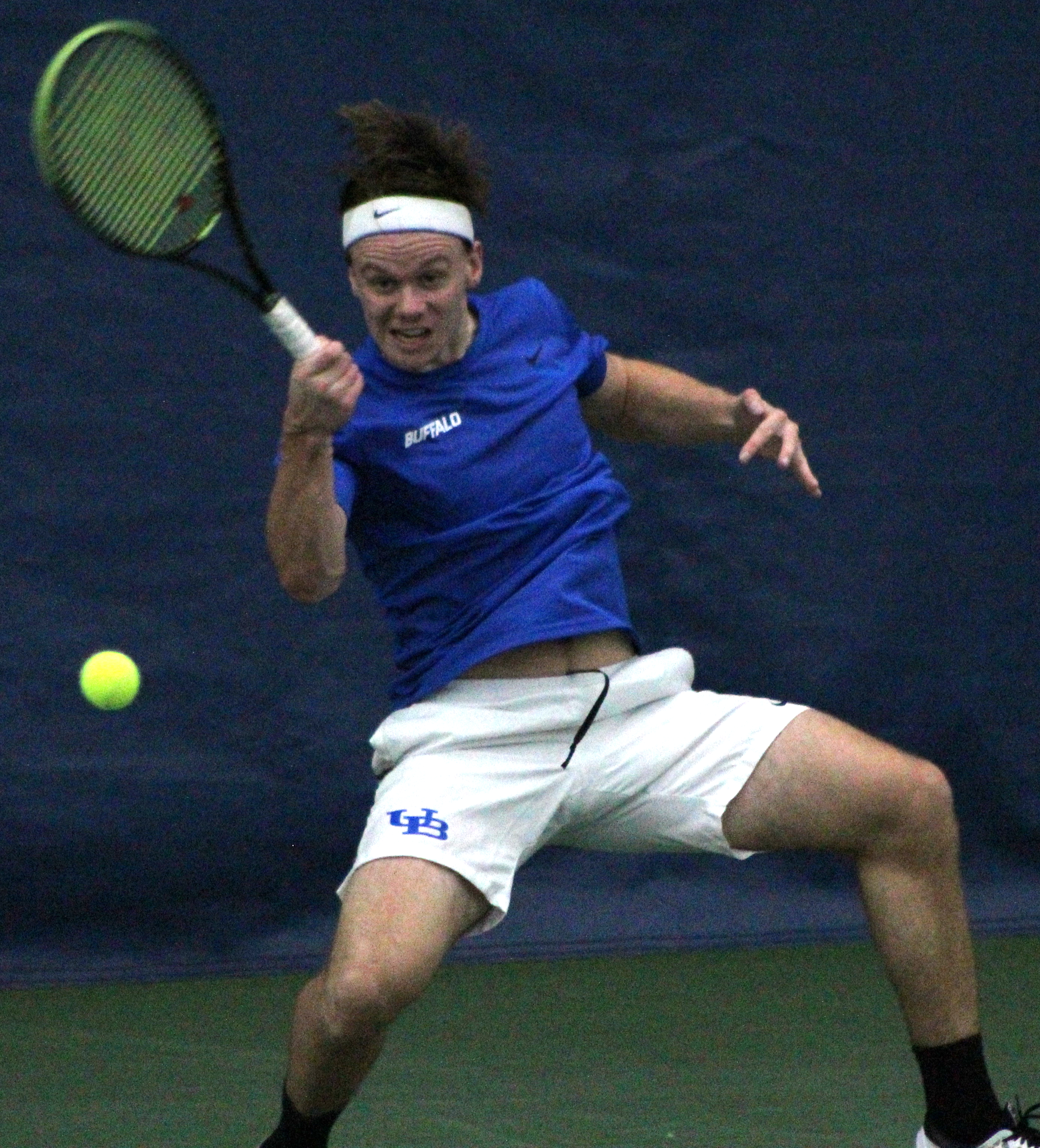
A Buffalo men's tennis player participating in a match in 2019

The current Men's tennis coach is Lee Nickell who was appointed in June 2009. As head coach the Bulls have posted winning records in five of their six seasons. He has achieved a 69–54 overall record. Nickel has been selected as MAC Coach of the Year twice, the first during his first season as the Bulls head coach in 2009 and also in 2015 when the Bulls advanced to NCAA tournament for the first time in history.

==== Women's tennis ====
The UB women's tennis team reached the MAC Championship from 2005 to 2008, losing to Western Michigan during the first two efforts. In 2008, the Bulls secured their first MAC title, defeating Western Michigan, 4–3. The Bulls then went on to their first NCAA tournament, where they played the eventual NCAA Champion, UCLA.

=== Track and field ===
==== Men's track and field ====
Men's track and field includes an outdoor and indoor season. In 2015 UB's men track and field star, Jonathan Jones, became the first national champion in any sport in UB's Division I history when he won the shot put at the NCAA Outdoor Track and Field Championships.

==== Women's track and field ====
Women's track and field includes an outdoor and an indoor season. Some women participate in both indoor and outdoor track and field.

=== Volleyball ===
In 2010, the UB women's volleyball team opened their season with a 3–0 win against Youngstown State University at the West Virginia University Mountaineer Classic. In that win, the Lady Bulls won three straight sets with scores of 26–24, 25–20, and 25–16 after a slow start in the first set. Several UB players in the game scored more than 7 kills each, with Kristin Bignell making 9 kills.

Lizaiha Garcia has played professionally and for the Puerto Rico women's national volleyball team. Dana Musil, the daughter of former National Hockey League defenseman Frank Musil and former tennis pro Andrea Holíková, sister of future NHL defenseman David Musil and niece of former NHL All-Star Bobby Holik, played volleyball for the Bulls.

=== Wrestling ===
In 1978, Buffalo won the NCAA Division III Wrestling Championship. In 1995, the entire 1977–78 team was inducted into the school's athletics hall of fame. As of December 2017, it is the school's only national champion team in any NCAA sport.

In 1999, Buffalo's first year in the MAC, John Eschenfelder won the conference's individual championship in the heavyweight division. Two years later he became the first Bulls wrestler to win multiple individual MAC wrestling championships.

In 2004, Kyle Cerminara became the first UB wrestler to be named an All-American. He graduated in 2006 as the school's all-time leader in wins with 137.

At the 2011 MAC Wrestling Tournament, Buffalo led all teams with four individual championships, a program record, but placed third nonetheless. John-Martin Cannon became the first UB wrestler named the Outstanding Wrestler of the Tournament and the school sent a record five wrestlers to the NCAA Division I Wrestling Championships.

== Formerly sponsored sports ==
=== Baseball ===
The Bulls baseball program was revived in 2000 and joined the MAC in 2001. It was coached by Bill Breene and later by Ron Torgalski. It compiled a final record of 304–568–1 after its revival and failed to qualify for the MAC baseball tournament once in its seventeen seasons in the conference.

The program was eliminated during the 2017 season.

=== Men's ice hockey ===
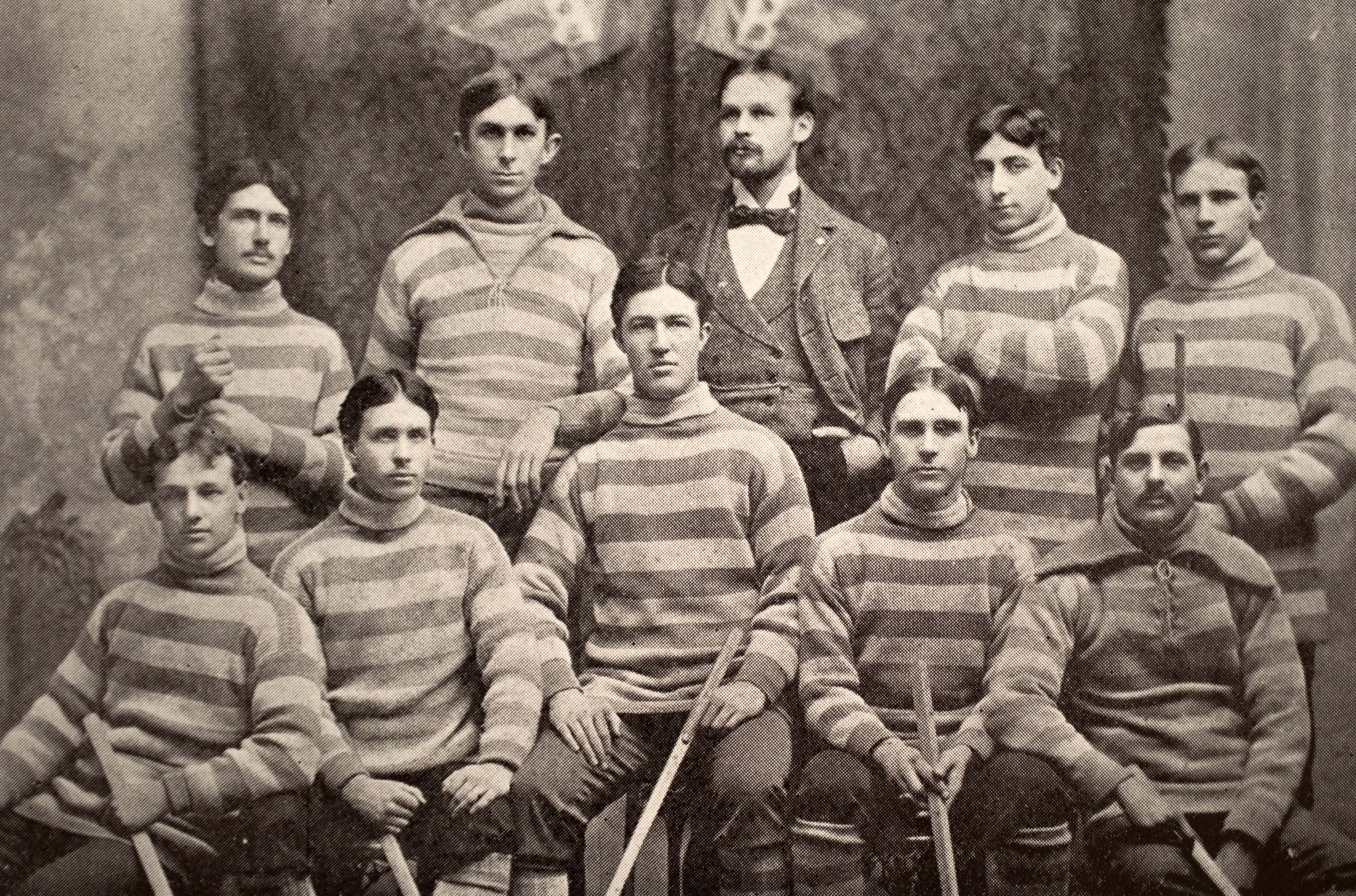
The first ice hockey team fielded by UB in 1895–96

Buffalo's men's ice hockey team was one of the earliest teams to represent the university, having begun play in 1895–96. It was abandoned and revived multiple times in the 20th century before ultimately becoming an official varsity sport in 1969–70. In 1970–71, Bulls coach, Afro-Canadian Ed Wright, became the first black coach in the history of college ice hockey. In 1977–78, Buffalo became a charter member of the New York Collegiate Hockey Association but left for the SUNYAC a year later. In the spring of 1987, the school withdrew its sponsorship of ice hockey and it became a club sport.

=== Women's rowing ===
The women's rowing program was founded in 1997. The Bulls rowing team competed in the Colonial Athletic Association (CAA). The Bulls won the CAA title in rowing in 2010 by one point against Northeastern, and finished a close second in 2011.

UB formerly hosted the annual Harvey Cup. The Cup was named in recognition and in memory of former Associate Athletic Director and Senior Administrator Nan Harvey, who died in September 2003 after battling cancer for more than three years. The Cup was held by Eastern Michigan from its inception until 2006 when the Bulls first claimed the Cup. Buffalo then won the Harvey Cup in 2006 through 2014, a run of 9 straight years.

At the time of the program's elimination in 2017, Buffalo was the only school in its conference that sponsored women's rowing.

=== Men's soccer ===
Buffalo's men's soccer program was established in 1971. Former goalkeeper Bobby Shuttleworth signed with the New England Revolution in 2009. In 2010, Martin John, a full back, successfully passed a trial at Cardiff City, earning a one-year contract. In 2017, Russell Cicerone became the first Buffalo player to be selected in the MLS SuperDraft.

Buffalo finished with a record of 12–4–3 in its final season, one of its best seasons on record. At the time of the program's elimination in 2017, only four other full MAC members sponsored men's soccer.

=== Men's swimming and diving ===
The men's swimming program was founded in 1948. In 2011, Buffalo won its first MAC championship and became the only school other than Eastern Michigan or Miami to win the conference championship since 1979. Just prior to the program's elimination, Buffalo swimmer Mason Miller was named the MAC Men's Swimmer of the Year. However, the sport was only sponsored by three other MAC schools in the 2016–17 academic year when it was eliminated.

== Mascot ==
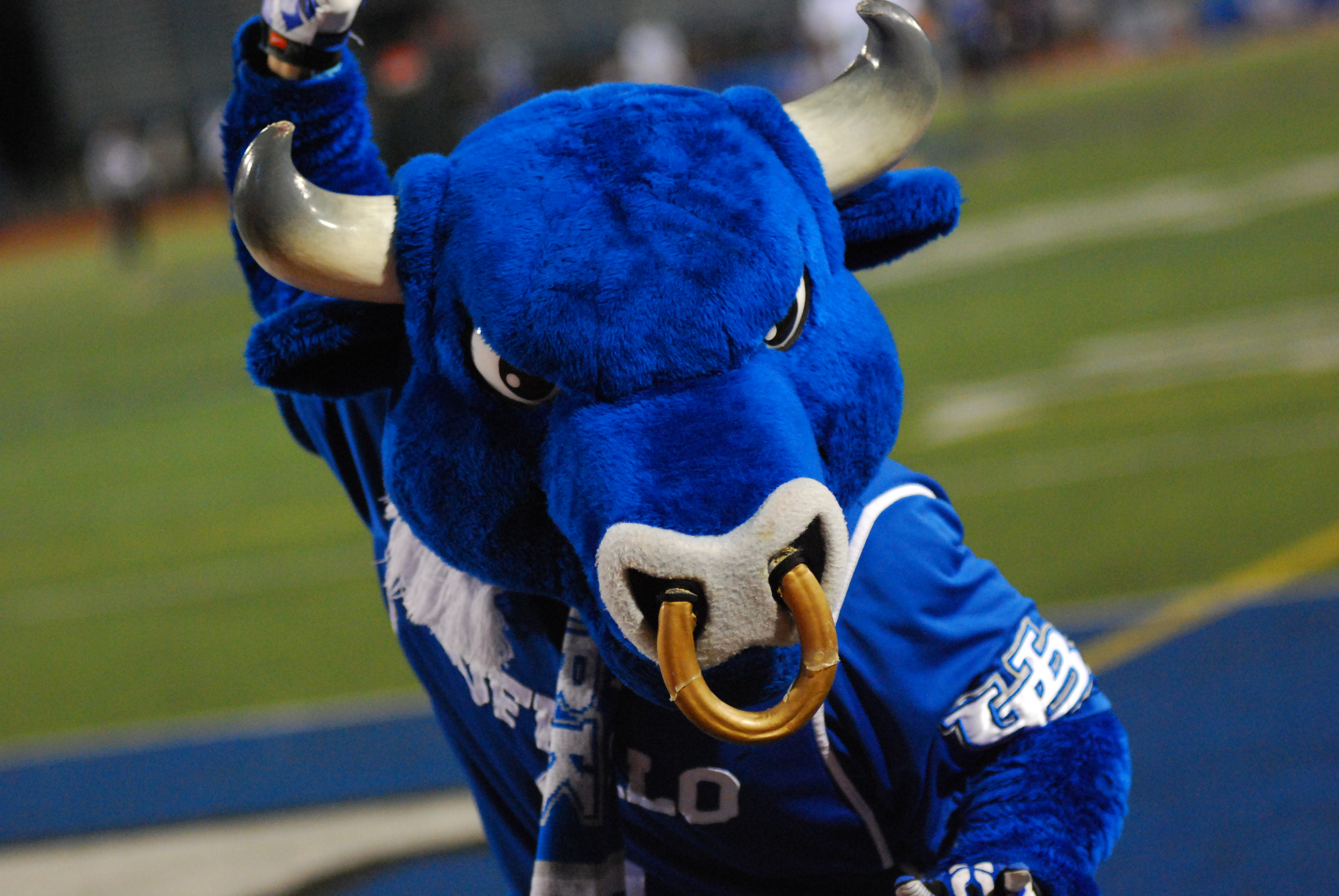
Victor E. Bull, Buffalo's mascot

Buffalo's first unofficial mascot was a 175-pound bison head nicknamed "Boscoe," which was given to the students by two alumni in 1934 at the first Homecoming football game. It is unknown where the location of the bison head is now.

In 1997, as part of Buffalo's preparation to return to the NCAA Division I, the Buffalo athletics department held a "name the mascot" contest with the help of the university newspaper. The name "Victor E. Bull" was submitted by undergraduate student, Rustie Hill, and was selected as the winning entry. Shortly thereafter, in 1997, the department adopted the anthropomorphic Victor E. Bull as the school's new mascot. At the football home opener that year, Hill was invited out onto the field with Victor E. Bull as he was introduced to the fans.

== Co-ed cheerleading ==
Cheerleading at UB includes a co-ed cheerleading team for men's football and basketball. The squad originally included women only. In the past 20 years, the cheerleading team has placed in the top ten, nationally, on at least seven occasions, including being named the national champion in 1994 and runner-up in 1995.

== Notable non-varsity sports ==
=== Rugby ===
Founded in 1966, the university at Buffalo Rugby Football Club competes in Division 1 of the New York State Rugby Conference. In the fall of 2007 the UBRFC started a Division 3 team playing in the Excelsior West Division of the New York State Rugby Conference. UB rugby has won four championships of the NYSRC Upstate Division 1 Tournament. The UBRFC Mad Turtles play all of their home games at the "Rugby Pitch" located at the Ellicott Complex on the UB's North Campus.

== True Blue ==
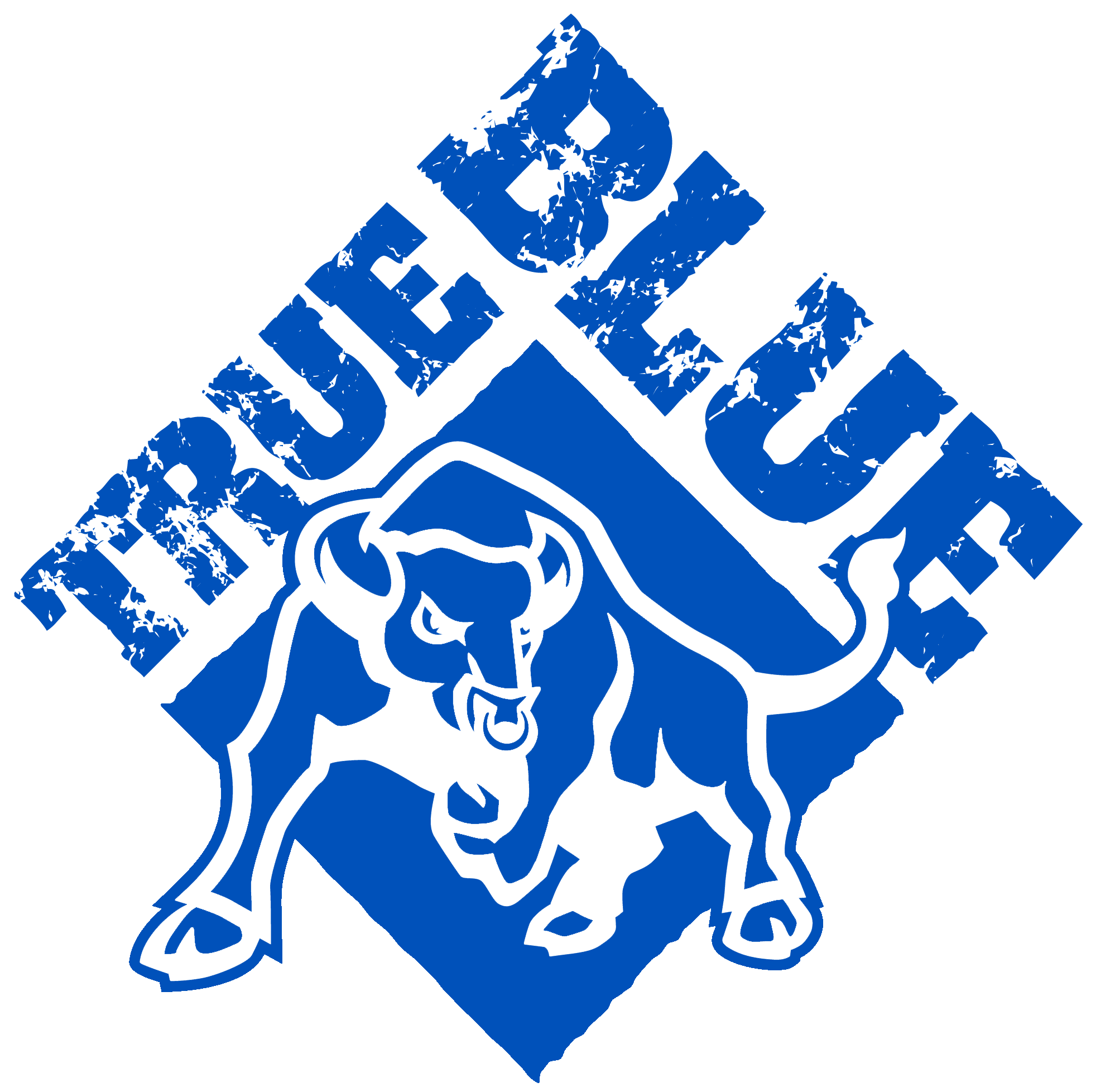
True Blue logo

As of 2007, the official student organization that supports Buffalo athletics is True Blue. The prominent faces of the organization include a group of at least ten students who paint themselves to spell out, "GO BULLS" for every home football game, and selected basketball games for both men and women. With more than 6,000 members, True Blue is the largest organization on campus.

True Blue also organizes selected road trips to support the Bulls. On September 3, 2011, True Blue took three buses full of students to Pittsburgh, Pennsylvania, for the season opening game against the University of Pittsburgh.

True Blue is run by an executive board of four members, and a Board of Directors of 10 members. They organize tailgate parties, road trips, events, and programs; and they help promote sports spirit and tradition throughout the university. The organization hopes to become "the most feared student section in the MAC." True Blue has been featured on major television networks such as ESPN, CBS, and NBC.

== Marching and pep bands ==
The Thunder of the East is the student marching band.

UB also maintains a student pep band, known as the Blue Noise Pep Band.

Fight songs of the bands include "Victory March", "Go for a Touchdown", and "Buffalo Fight Song."

== Block B Letter Winners Association ==
The mission of the Block B Letter Winners Association at UB is to connect former student-athletes and sustain UB's athletic tradition. The Association is open to all former UB student-athletes, coaches, managers, trainers, and cheerleaders who have participated and/or served in athletics for at least one year. As of 2014, there is a membership fee of $75 that is required to join the Association; and many benefits of membership are offered.

== Athletics Hall of Fame ==
The UB Athletics Hall of Fame is sponsored by the UB Alumni Association. One member of the Hall of Fame is UB's late president, Bill Greiner, who brought the university back to Division I status.
