= Buffalo Bulls wrestling =

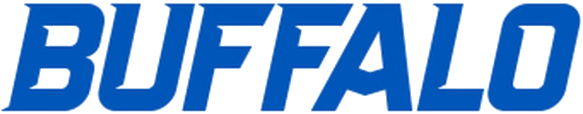
- University: State University of New York at Buffalo
- Athletic director: Mark Alnutt
- Head coach: Donnie Vinson (1st season)
- Conference: MAC
- Location: Amherst, NY
- Arena: Alumni Arena (capacity: 6,100)
- Nickname: Bulls
- Colors: Royal blue and white

Team national championships
- 1 (NCAA Division III)

National championship years
- 1978

NCAA individual champions
- 2 (NCAA Division III)

Conference championships
- 1987 (SUNYAC)

The Buffalo Bulls wrestling team is a varsity intercollegiate athletic team of the University at Buffalo in Amherst, New York. The team is a member of the Mid-American Conference (MAC), which is part of the National Collegiate Athletic Association's Division I. Their home matches are held at Alumni Arena in Amherst, New York. The Bulls are coached by Donnie Vinson.

== History ==
In 1978, Buffalo won the NCAA Division III Wrestling Championship. In 1995, the entire 1977–78 team was inducted into the school's athletics hall of fame. As of December 2017, it is the school's only national champion team in any NCAA sport.

in 1987, the Bulls won the State University of New York Athletic Conference Wrestling Tournament, upsetting the nation's top ranked team, the Brockport Golden Eagles, despite not finishing at the top of any individual weight class.

In 1999, Buffalo's first year in the MAC, John Eschenfelder won the MAC's individual championship in the heavyweight division. Two years later he became the first Bulls wrestler to win multiple individual MAC wrestling championships.

In 2004, Kyle Cerminara became the first UB wrestler to be named an All-American. He graduated in 2006 as the school's all-time leader in wins with 137.

At the 2011 MAC Wrestling Tournament, Buffalo led all teams with four individual champions (Andrew Schutt, Desi Green, Mark Lewandowski and John-Martin Cannon), a program record, but placed third nonetheless. John-Martin Cannon became the first UB wrestler named the Outstanding Wrestler of the Tournament and the school sent a record five wrestlers to the NCAA Division I Wrestling Championships.

== National championships ==
=== Individual ===
Association	Division	Year	Event	Individual(s)	Score
NCAA	Division III	1986	167 lbs.	Steve Klein	7–2
NCAA	Division III	1980	118 lbs.	Tom Jacoutot	Fall (7:48)

=== Team ===
Association	Division	Year	Score
NCAA	Division III	1978	91 3/4
