= Buffalo Bulls football =

Football team for the State University of New York at Buffalo

| 2026 Buffalo Bulls football team |
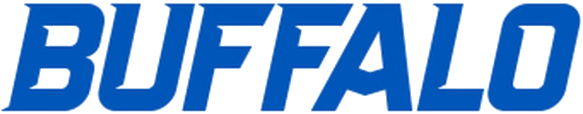
- First season: 1894; 132 years ago
- Athletic director: Mark Alnutt
- Head coach: Pete Lembo; 2nd season, 14–11 (.560)
- Location: Buffalo, New York
- Stadium: Broadview Stadium (capacity: 30,270)
- NCAA division: Division I FBS
- Conference: MAC
- Colors: Royal blue and white
- All-time record: 422–568–28 (.428)
- Bowl record: 4–3 (.571)

Conference championships
- MAC: 2008

Division championships
- MAC East: 2007, 2008, 2018, 2020
- Consensus All-Americans: 1

Uniforms
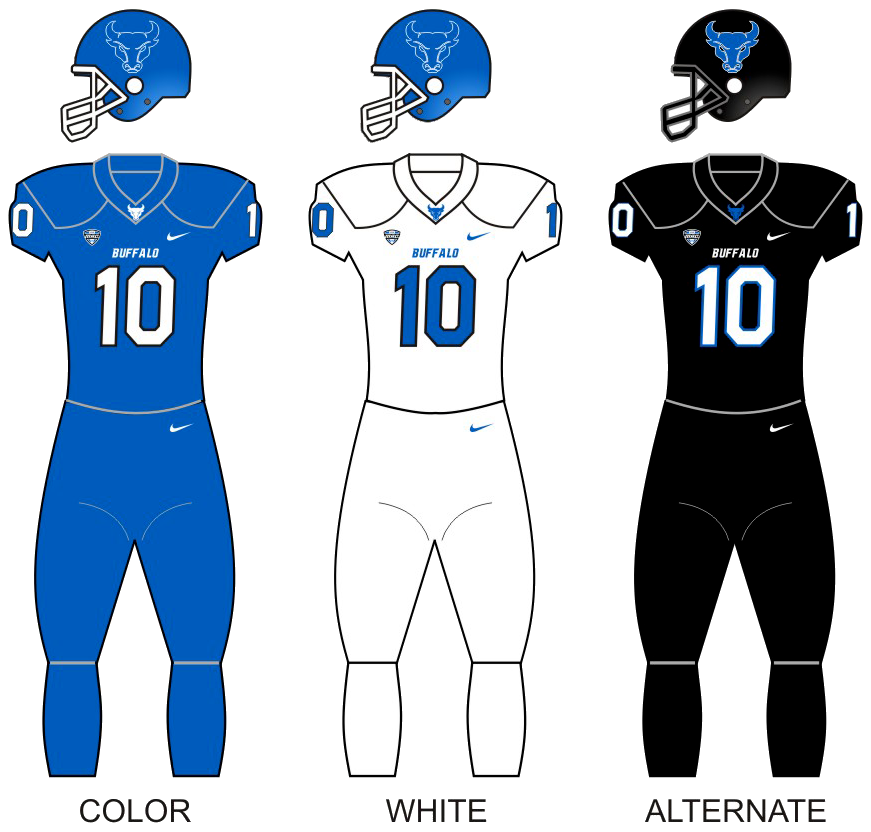
- Fight song: Victory March
- Mascot: Victor E. Bull
- Marching band: Thunder of the East
- Outfitter: Nike
- Website: UBBulls.com

The Buffalo Bulls football program is the intercollegiate American football team for the University at Buffalo located in the U.S. state of New York. The team competes at the NCAA Division I level in the Football Bowl Subdivision and is a member of the Mid-American Conference. Buffalo's first football team was fielded in 1894. The team plays its home games at the 30,270 seat Broadview Stadium on University at Buffalo's north campus in Buffalo, New York. The Bulls are coached by Pete Lembo.

== History ==
UB's first run with football started in 1894 and lasted until 1970, when the football program was suspended due to the student body's vote to stop funding the program. The football program was reintroduced in 1977. When reintroduced, the team played in Division III level football until 1992. In 1993, the school made the jump to Division I-AA. In 1999, the Bulls moved up again to Division I-A Bowl Subdivision level football.

=== Early history (1894–1903) ===
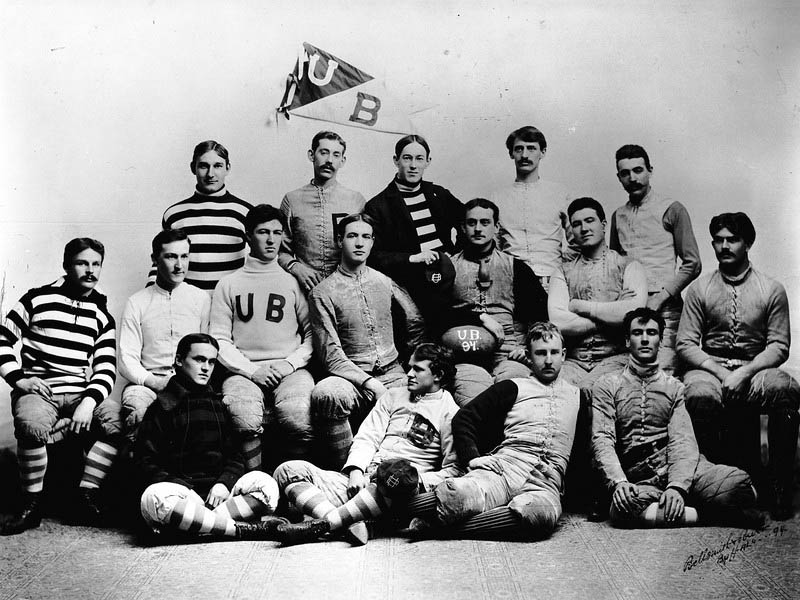
The first team fielded by the University of Buffalo, 1894

In 1894, UB established an athletics association and fourteen UB Medical students formed the first UB football team. By 1896, they were a local force in Western New York football playing collegiate and club teams and finishing the season with an impressive 9–1–2 record. In 1897, C. W. Dibble coached UB to a perfect 7–0–0 record beating Syracuse twice. In 1899, Bemus Pierce coached UB to a 6–0 record. This likely made Pierce the first American Indian head coach in college football. In 1900, Buffalo beat Penn State 10–0. In 1901, former player James B. "Turk" Gordon coached the UB team to a 4–2 record. In 1903, Ray Turnbull led the UB team to a 3–3 record. After the 1903 season, UB would not again put a team on the field until 1915.

=== The UB Bisons (1915–1930) ===
In 1915, UB re-established the football program and officially instituted men's basketball. Both teams were named the 'Bisons' and used as their logo a caricature of a male American bison, often outfitted in a UB jersey. Frank Mount Pleasant was called on to coach the football team but was replaced the following season after a 3–4 record. Art Powell would take over in 1916 and coach the team for six seasons (13–22–5). In 1920, UB would start playing on what would eventually be called Rotary Field. UB would go through two coaches in a span of two years – 'Dim' Batterson in 1922 and James Bond in 1923 – before Russ Carrick would take over, serving five seasons despite winning only five games (while losing 30 and garnering two ties). The team would last be known as the Bisons under the command of Jay "Biffy" Lee, who coached for two seasons (until 1930), leading UB to an 8–7 record.

=== Welcome the Bulls (1930–1942) ===
In 1931, the university changed its mascot to the Bulls in order to distinguish UB from professional teams in the Queen City. The Bulls played every year until the outbreak of World War II mainly under the coaching guidance of Jim Peele who was at the helm from 1935 to 1942 and led the Bulls to a 38–34–1 record including a 6–2 season in 1942.

=== Post–World War II (1946–1954) ===
After World War II, UB again took to the gridiron under Peele, who led UB in two impressive seasons of 7–2 (1946) and 8–1 (1947), but were not selected to a bowl in either season. The program was next taken over by Frank Clair, who coached for two seasons, leaving with an impressive mark of 12–4–1. The following season represented one of the low points for UB when, under the guidance of coach Fritz Febel, UB won only four games in three years with an overall record of 4–19–1.

=== Offenhamer era (1955–1965) ===
If the Febel season can be seen as one of the low points in UB football history, then Dick Offenhamer brought in UB's most successful era when from 1955 to 1965, he would coach UB to an impressive 58–37–5 record. In 1958, the football team won the Lambert Cup, emblematic of supremacy in Eastern U.S. small-college football. That led to the team's first bowl invitation, to the Tangerine Bowl in Orlando, Florida against Florida State University. However, the Orlando Elks Lodge, the bowl's sponsor, told the Bulls that they would be allowed to participate only if back-up defensive end Mike Wilson and starting halfback Willie Evans, who were black, did not play. Despite protests from the Elks Lodge, the local high school association that operated the stadium – the Orlando High School Athletic Association – refused to rescind its rule against integrated events. The team stood behind the two, and unanimously refused the bowl offer. The team was profiled on ESPN's Outside the Lines in 2008. Buffalo would not be invited to a bowl or be bowl-eligible for another 50 years.

Several UB football stars from the Offenhamer years went on to have careers in professional football, including quarterback John Stofa with the American Football League's Miami Dolphins and Cincinnati Bengals, and defensive lineman Gerry Philbin with the AFL's New York Jets, and Buddy Ryan who was on Offenhamer staff as the defensive line coach. Philbin is a member of the AFL Hall of Fame and the All-time All-AFL Team. Philbin and UB's Willie Ross were the first two UB graduates to play on professional football championship teams: Ross with the 1964 AFL Champion Buffalo Bills; and Philbin with the 1968 AFL Champion New York Jets, who went on to win Super Bowl III. They have been followed by Ramon Guzman who played on two Grey Cup Championship teams with the Montreal Alouettes and James Starks with the Super Bowl XLV champion Green Bay Packers.

=== Out with a whimper (1965–1970) ===
Following the departure of Offenhamer in 1965, UB lasted only five more years before suspending football in 1970. There was some success under coach Doc Urich, who led UB to an 18–12 record over three years, but declining performance under his successor, Bob Deming (1969–1970) and financial issues caused UB to suspend its football program. The main reason that football was dropped was that the student body voted to stop funding the team. At the time athletics at UB were fully funded by student fees. It would be seven years until UB would again take the field.

=== Division III football (1977–1992) ===
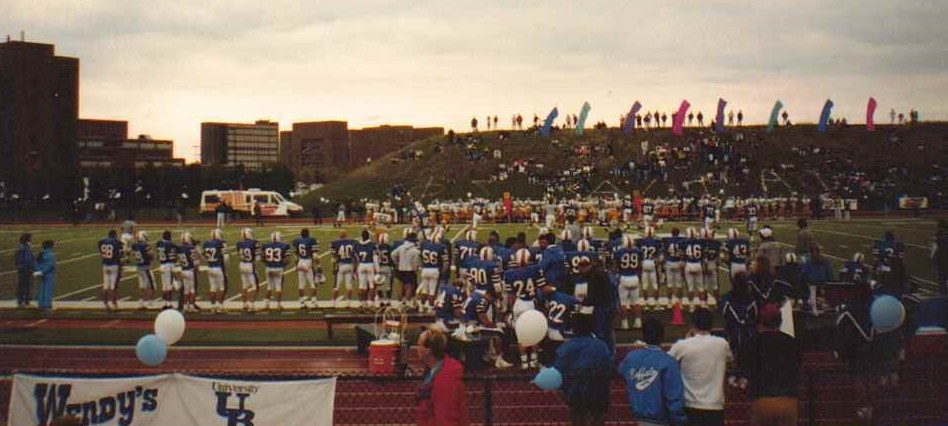
Buffalo Bulls vs. Canisius at UB, October 1991

In 1977 UB began playing football at the NCAA Division III level under Coach Bill Dando, who would be the Bulls' longest serving coach, lasting thirteen years. UB had moderate success during his tenure, and he retired after the 1989 season. Sam Sanders would take over, but lasted only two seasons. His coaching career ended because of medical issues and Jim Ward was promoted because of a New York State hiring freeze and ushered in UB's return to Division I football. In 1986 the Bulls upset Villanova for their biggest win of the season. Douglas Engel was named Freshman Defensive player of the year (1986–87).

=== Division I-AA (1993–1998) ===
UB's return to Division I football started in Division I-AA (known today as the Football Championship Subdivision). UB would have only one winning season during their time in I-AA. Under Coach Craig Cirbus, UB would go 8–3 in 1996. This would be UB's last season at or above .500 for a dozen years.

=== Return to Division I-A (1999–2005) ===
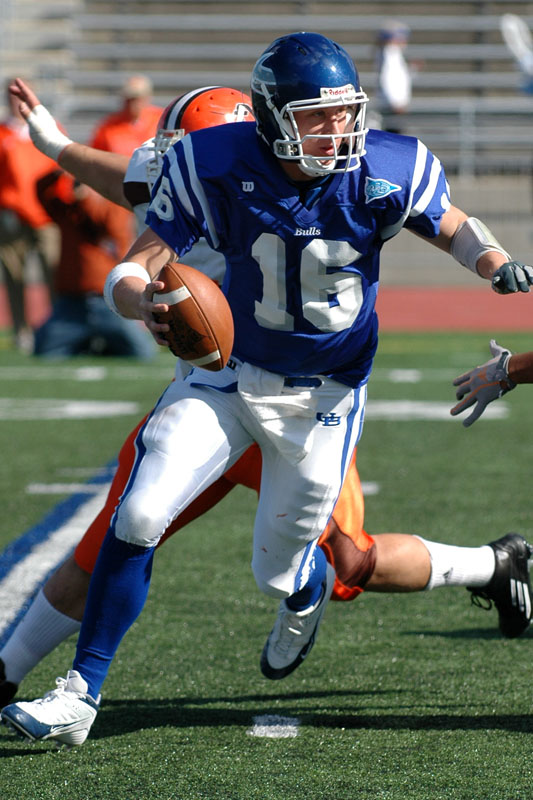
Drew Willy scrambles against Bowling Green in 2005

In 1999 UB joined the Mid-American Conference in Division I-A (Football Bowl Subdivision) football. They retained their head coach from their I-AA seasons, Craig Cirbus. After a few years of dismal results, the team hired Jim Hofher, a former head coach at Division I-AA Cornell University to be the head coach. However, Hofher's teams were marked by poor discipline and lack of effort, and won only eight games during his five seasons at UB. Buffalo won only 10 games and lost 69 during this seven-year period, the second-worst record in the Football Bowl Subdivision during that time. A 2002 win on the road over Rutgers was their only win against a BCS team until 2013.

=== Turner Gill era (2006–2009) ===
In early December 2005, Hofher was replaced by Green Bay Packers assistant coach and former Heisman Trophy candidate Turner Gill. The former University of Nebraska quarterback led the program in a remarkable turnaround, helping the team to a 5–7 (5–3 MAC East divisional co-champions) in 2007, their best season since the school joined the MAC.

On November 21, 2008, the Buffalo Bulls won their first outright MAC Eastern Division Championship, sealing the win with a thrilling 2-OT victory over Bowling Green, 40–34. Down 27–7 at the beginning of the 4th quarter, the Bulls stormed back to tie the game at 27 and force it into overtime. In the second OT, running back James Starks ran 25 yards on the first play for a touchdown and a Bulls win. The quarterback coach for Bowling Green that day was former UB head coach Jim Hofher.

Following a loss to Kent State that broke a five-game winning streak for Buffalo, the Bulls entered the conference title game at 7–5, while MAC West champion Ball State was an unblemished 12–0. However, on December 5, at Ford Field in Detroit, Buffalo's defense returned two fumbles for touchdowns and the Bulls defeated the Cardinals, 42–24, to become Mid-American Conference champions for 2008. Their successful season earned the Bulls an invitation to the International Bowl in Toronto, Ontario to face Connecticut. The Bulls went on to lose that game to UConn by a score of 38–20.

2009 would not be as successful as Starks was lost before the season even started to a shoulder injury. The offense also struggled without four-year starting quarterback Drew Willy as new quarterback Zach Maynard had an up-and-down season as UB finished 5–7. After the season, Gill left to become head coach of Kansas.

=== Jeff Quinn era (2010–2014) ===
On December 20, 2009, it was first reported that Jeff Quinn would be the new head coach. He took over after coaching Cincinnati in the 2010 Sugar Bowl. In Quinn's first season as coach, he was unable to build upon Gill's success as UB finished the season 2–10. Over the subsequent two seasons he amassed a record of 7–17.

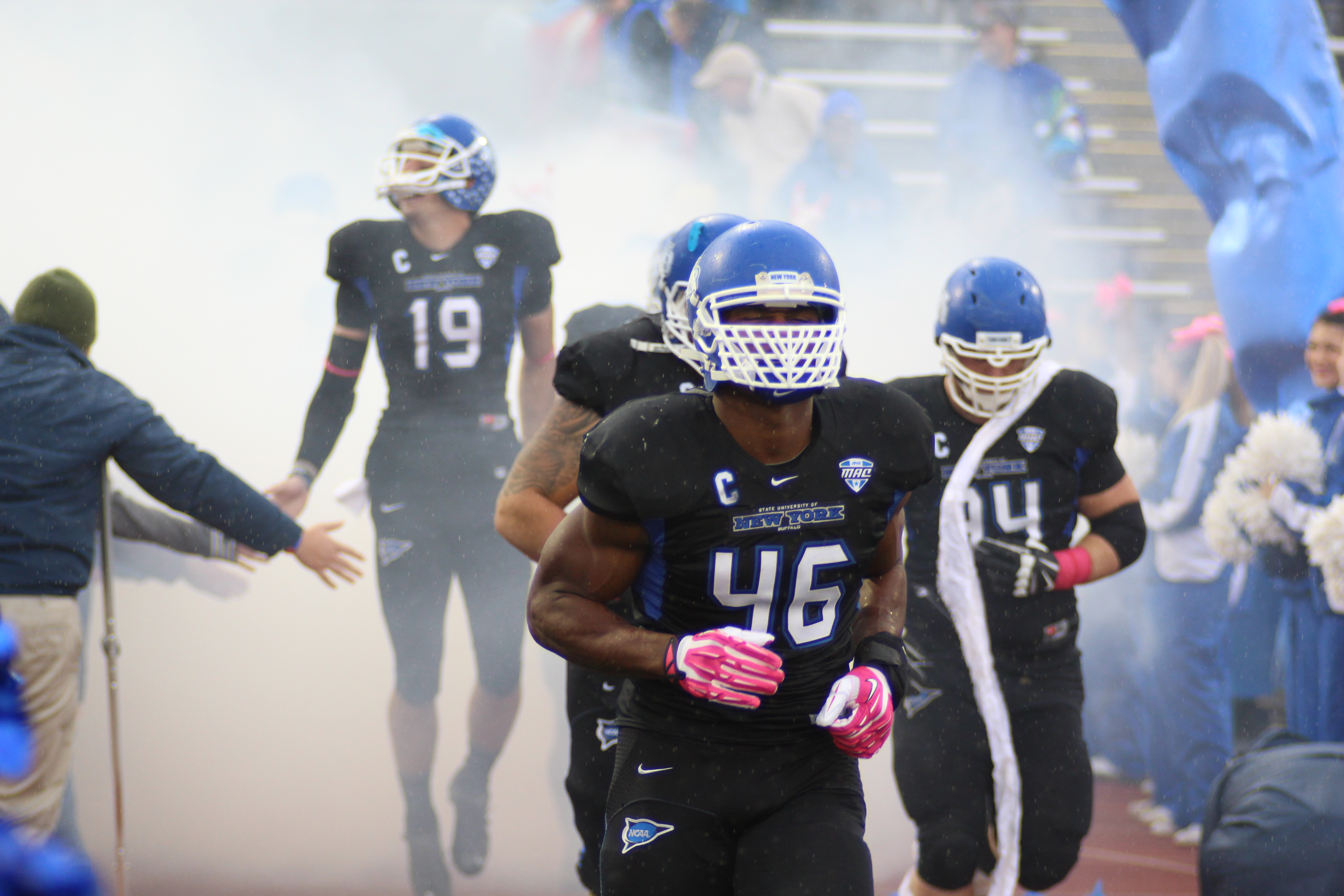
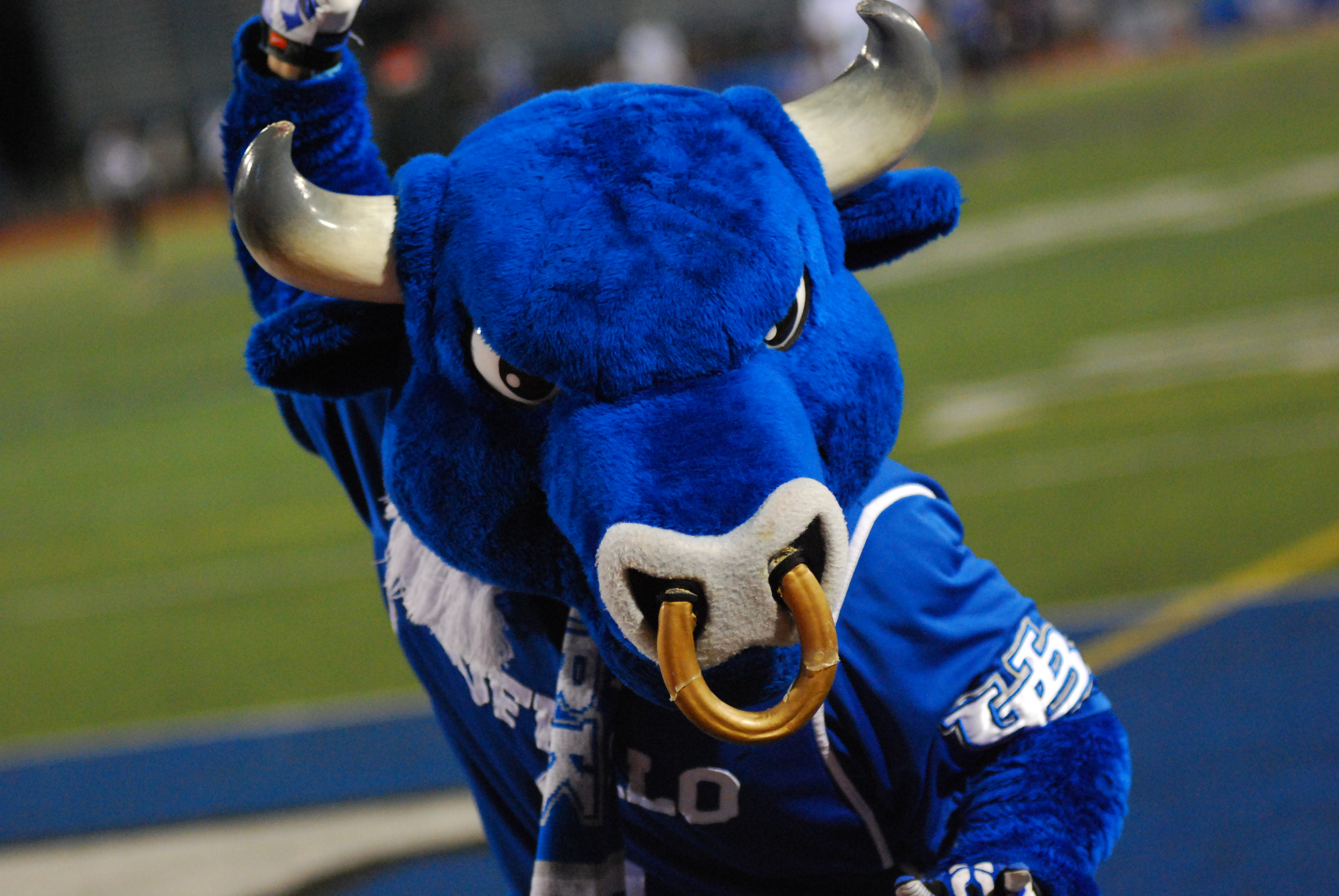
The team entering the field with linebacker Khalil Mack at front (left) and Victor E. Bull, the team's mascot, both pictured in 2013

The Bulls entered the 2013 season with low hopes. These were accentuated with season-opening losses to No. 4 Ohio State and No. 23 Baylor, 20–40 and 13–70, as they started the season 0–2. However, after a quintuple overtime 26–23 victory against Stony Brook in week 3, the team surged to 7 straight wins, including a 41–12 victory over Connecticut at UB Stadium on September 28, their first win against a BCS opponent since 2002, and clinched bowl eligibility for just the third time in team history with a 41–21 victory at Kent State on October 26. The 7 game winning streak was the longest winning streak in Bulls team history, and ended with a 41–51 loss at the Glass Dome to Toledo on November 12. The team finished the regular season 8–4, and finished in second place in the conference. The team ultimately went on to play in the Famous Idaho Potato Bowl against San Diego State, losing the game 24–49. The team finished with an overall record of 8–5. This 2013 team featured Khalil Mack who went 5th overall in the 2014 NFL draft to the Oakland Raiders, making him the highest player in Buffalo history to ever be drafted, as well as the highest defensive player in the Mid-American Conference to ever be drafted. This team also featured the undrafted Branden Oliver, who broke James Starks's rushing record of most rushing yards in school history. Oliver signed with the San Diego Chargers and was thrust into the starting lineup during the 2014 NFL season after early season injuries to Ryan Mathews, Danny Woodhead and Donald Brown.

Quinn was dismissed partway through the 2014 season after accumulating a 3–4 record.

=== Lance Leipold era (2015–2020) ===
Lance Leipold, who spent eight seasons as the head coach of the Division III University of Wisconsin at Whitewater (where he won six championships), was hired as the Bulls' next head coach shortly after the 2014 season.

Leipold's first season with Bulls produced a 5–7 overall standing with a 3–5 Mid-American Conference result. After a mixed start to their 2015 season, Buffalo lost three straight games before beating the Ohio Bobcats football team 41–17, the first of two more wins against Miami Ohio 29–24, and then Kent State 18–17. The Bulls lost their 3 remaining games of the 2015 season.

Buffalo fared worse under Leipold in their 2016 campaign, notching a 2–10 overall standing with a 1–7 conference result. The only two wins of the 2016 season came against the Army Black Knights on September 24, 2016, when the Bulls won 23–20; and against the Akron Zips on October 27, 2016, winning 41–20. Buffalo suffered two notable losses in 2016. The first was a 35–3 loss to Boston College, and the second a 38–0 shutout delivered by the Western Michigan Broncos. Calls for Leipold's firing were made, but a hefty buyout clause in his contract would keep him in Buffalo for at least two more seasons.

In June 2017, the university received state approval for the construction of an $18 million indoor athletic training facility, slated to be built just north of UB Stadium. Buffalo would be the last school in the MAC without such a facility.

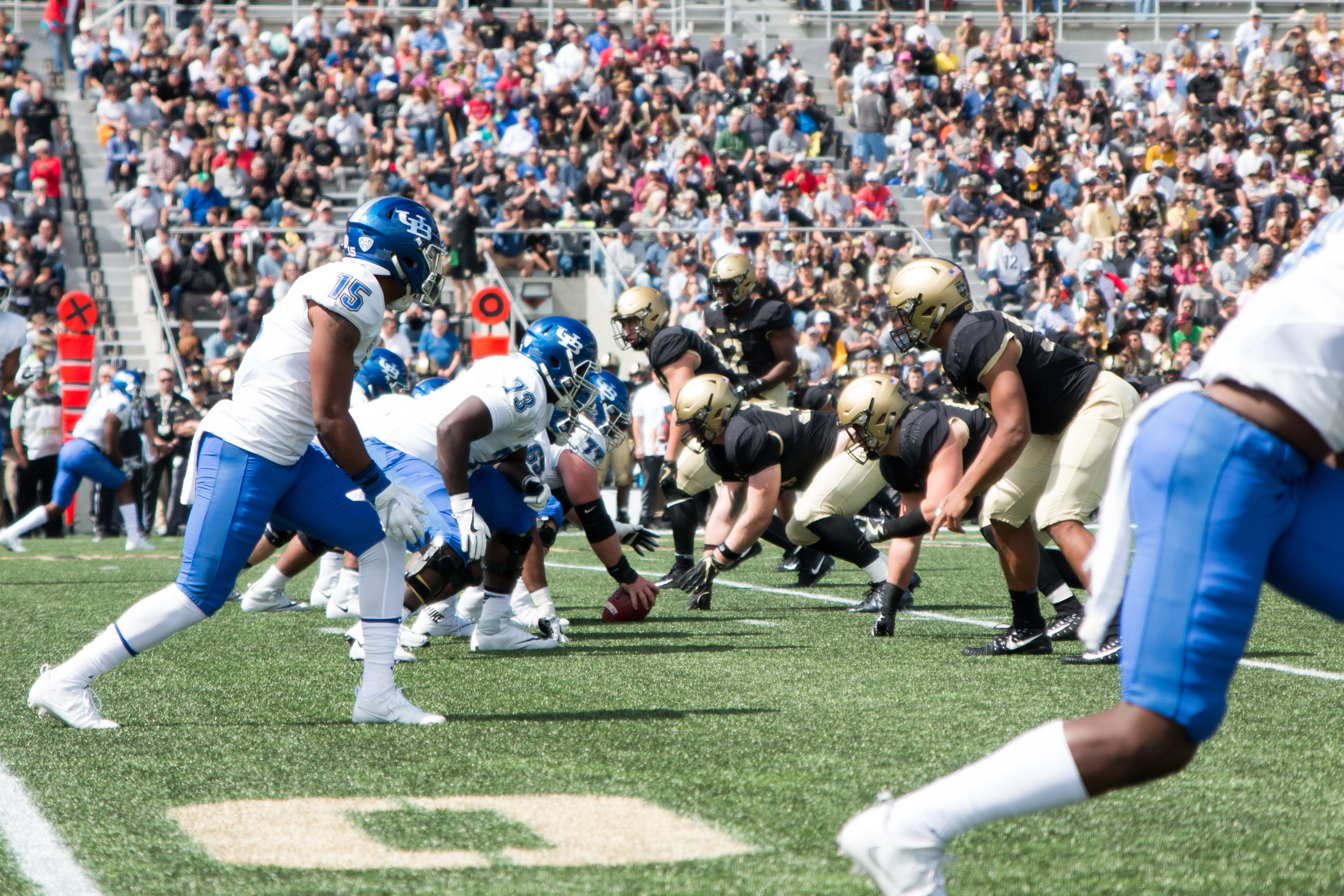
Buffalo lines up on offense before a snap during a 2017 game against Army

Leipold improved upon his lackluster 2016 result in the Bulls' 2017 season. After losing its first game to Minnesota 7–17 and the second to Army 17–21, Buffalo won its next three games straight. Buffalo then suffered a string of 4 losses. The first was an attempt to avenge the previous season's 38–0 shutout loss to Western Michigan. Playing at home on October 7, 2017, the Bulls battled back against the Broncos to tie the game 31–31, scoring 17 points in the 4th quarter. Buffalo would eventually lose 71–68 after 7 overtimes. It was the most overtimes since a 26–23 victory in 5 overtimes at home against Stony Brook in 2013. Among the next three losses was a one-point squeaker against Northern Illinois 13–14 the week after. The Bulls wound up winning their last 3 games of 2017. They finished the season with a 6–6 overall standing and a 4–4 conference record.

In 2018, Leipold led the Bulls to a 10–2 regular season and 7–1 overall conference standing en route to the MAC East division championship game. The Bulls also had the best away record in the 2018 MAC conference, posting a 5–1 result and was the only team lose just 1 away game. Unfortunately, the Bulls - led by wide receiver Anthony Johnson with 7 receptions for 140 yards on the day - would lose the division championship 13–14 to the Northern Illinois Huskies, the same result as their 2017 regular season matchup. Buffalo then lost 32–42 to Troy in the 2018 Dollar General Bowl. Buffalo didn't run a single offensive play in the second half until the first minute of the 4th quarter, with Troy eventually blocking a late field goal attempt to close out the game.

The 2019 season saw Buffalo win their first bowl game in program history, defeating the Charlotte 49ers 31–9 at the 2019 Bahamas Bowl, posting an 8–5 overall record and a respectable 5–3 MAC conference standing.

The pandemic-shortened 2020 season saw star running back Jaret Patterson burst on to the national stage, including getting his name floated in Heisman Trophy talk. In his game against Kent State, he rushed for over 400 yards and tied the FBS record for touchdowns in a game with eight. Buffalo also received their first national ranking in program history in week 15, coming in at No. 24 in the AP Poll. After Buffalo finished the regular season undefeated at 5–0, their ranking increased to No. 23. The season culminated in their second consecutive bowl win in the Camellia Bowl. Leipold departed the Bulls after the season to take over the Kansas Jayhawks.

=== Maurice Linguist era (2021–2023) ===
In late 2020, Maurice Linguist was hired as the co-defensive coordinator at the University of Michigan. However, on May 7, 2021, he was hired as the head coach at the University at Buffalo. Despite Buffalo's poor performance in 2021, Linguist's recruiting class for 2022 was described by Sports Illustrated as the second-best in the Mid-American Conference. In July 2022, he signed a one-year contract extension. In his second season as head coach, Linguist led the Bulls to a 6–6 record in the regular season, earning an invite to the 2022 Camellia Bowl. UB defeated Georgia Southern 23–21, earning their first bowl win under Linguist.

On January 16, 2024, it was reported that Linguist had resigned as the head coach in order to join the Alabama defensive coaching staff, which was confirmed by the University at Buffalo later the same day.

=== Pete Lembo era (2024–present) ===
On January 21, 2024, Pete Lembo was named the head coach at Buffalo. On a 5-year contract, he will be earning a base salary of $725,000 before bonuses for wins and postseason appearances.

== Conference affiliations ==
Buffalo has been both an independent and affiliated with conferences, including periods where no team was fielded.

- Independent (1894–1903)
- No team (1904–1914)
- Independent (1915–1925)
- New York State Conference (1926–1934)
- Independent (1935–1942)
- No team (1943–1945)
- Independent (1946–1970)
- No team (1971–1976)
- Independent (1977–1998)
- Mid-American Conference (1999–present)

== Championships ==
=== Conference championships ===
Buffalo has won one conference championship, doing so after beating Ball State in the 2008 MAC Championship Game 42–24.

| Season | Conference | Head coach | Overall record | Conference record |
|---|---|---|---|---|
| 2008 | Mid-American Conference | Turner Gill | 8–6 | 5–3 |

=== Division championships ===
As winners of the Mid-American Conference's East Division, Buffalo has made three appearances in the MAC Championship Game, in 2008, 2018, and 2020. The Bulls also shared the Division title with Miami in 2007, but the tie-breaker allowed the RedHawks to represent the division in the championship game.

| Year | Division championship | Opponent | CG result |
|---|---|---|---|
| 2007† | MAC East | N/A, lost tiebreaker to Miami | |
| 2008 | MAC East | Ball State | W 42–24 |
| 2018 | MAC East | Northern Illinois | L 29–30 |
| 2020 | MAC East | Ball State | L 28–38 |

† Co-champion

== Bowl games ==
Buffalo has participated in seven bowl games, with a bowl game record of 4–3.

| Season | Coach | Bowl | Opponent | Result |
|---|---|---|---|---|
| 1958 | Dick Offenhamer | Tangerine Bowl | Florida State | Declined* |
| 2008 | Turner Gill | International Bowl | Connecticut | L 20–38 |
| 2013 | Jeff Quinn | Famous Idaho Potato Bowl | San Diego State | L 24–49 |
| 2018 | Lance Leipold | Dollar General Bowl | Troy | L 32–42 |
| 2019 | Lance Leipold | Bahamas Bowl | Charlotte | W 31–9 |
| 2020 | Lance Leipold | Camellia Bowl | Marshall | W 17–10 |
| 2022 | Maurice Linguist | Camellia Bowl | Georgia Southern | W 23–21 |
| 2024 | Pete Lembo | Bahamas Bowl | Liberty | W 26–7 |

The 1958 Buffalo team declined the Tangerine Bowl invitation due to Florida's segregation laws at the time which would not have allowed Buffalo's two black players to participate.

== Head coaches ==
Buffalo has been led by the following head coaches.

| Coach | Tenure | Season(s) | Record | Pct. |
|---|---|---|---|---|
| No coach | 1894–1895 | | | |
| Fred D. Townsend | 1896 | 1 | 9–1–2 | .833 |
| C. W. Dibble | 1897 | 1 | 9–1 | .900 |
| Louis Hinkey | 1898 | 1 | 8–1 | .889 |
| Bemus Pierce | 1899 | 1 | 7–1 | .875 |
| No coach | 1900 | | | |
| James B. "Turk" Gordon | 1901 | 1 | 4–2 | .667 |
| No coach | 1902 | | | |
| Ray Turnbull | 1903 | 1 | 3–3 | .500 |
| No team | 1904–1914 | | | |
| Frank Mount Pleasant | 1915 | 1 | 3–3 | .500 |
| Art Powell | 1916–1921 | 6 | 13–22–5 | .388 |
| Dim Batterson | 1922 | 1 | 1–5 | .167 |
| James Bond | 1923 | 1 | 2–5–1 | .313 |
| Russ Carrick | 1924–1928 | 5 | 5–30–2 | .162 |
| Jay L. Lee | 1929–1930 | 2 | 8–7 | .533 |
| William Pritchard | 1931 | 1 | 2–6 | .250 |
| James B. Wilson | 1932–1933, 1950–1951 | 2, 2 | 12–15–3 | .450 |
| George Van Bibber | 1934–1935 | 2 | 4–10–1 | .300 |
| Jim Peele | 1936–1942, 1946–1947 | 7, 2 | 38–34–1 | .527 |
| No team | 1943–1945 | | | |
| Frank Clair | 1948–1949 | 2 | 12–4–1 | .735 |
| Fritz Febel | 1952–1954 | 3 | 4–19–1 | .188 |
| Dick Offenhamer | 1955–1965 | 11 | 58–37–5 | .605 |
| Doc Urich | 1966–1968 | 3 | 18–12 | .600 |
| Bob Deming | 1969–1970 | 2 | 8–12 | .400 |
| No team | 1971–1976 | | | |
| Bill Dando | 1977–1989 | 13 | 59–64–1 | .480 |
| Sam Sanders | 1990–1991 | 2 | 5–15–0 | .250 |
| Jim Ward | 1992–1994 | 3 | 8–24 | .250 |
| Craig Cirbus | 1995–2000 | 6 | 19–47 | .288 |
| Jim Hofher | 2001–2005 | 5 | 8–49 | .140 |
| Turner Gill | 2006–2009 | 4 | 20–30 | .400 |
| Jeff Quinn | 2010–2014 | 5 | 20–36 | .357 |
| Alex Wood† | 2014 | 1 | 2–2 | .500 |
| Lance Leipold | 2015–2020 | 6 | 37–33 | .529 |
| Maurice Linguist | 2021–2023 | 3 | 14–23 | .378 |
| Pete Lembo | 2024–present | 2 | 14–11 | .560 |

† Interim

=== NFL/AFL drafted players ===
| Name | Year | Round | Team |
|---|---|---|---|
| Les Molnar | 1952 | 18 | New York Yanks |
| Frank Woidzik | 1958 | 4 | Los Angeles Rams |
| Lou Reale | 1959 | 25 | New York Giants |
| Willie Evans | 1960 | - | Buffalo Bills |
| Gerry Philbin | 1964 | 3 | New York Jets |
| Ed Ellis | 1997 | 4 | New England Patriots |
| Drew Haddad | 2000 | 7 | Buffalo Bills |
| Trevor Scott | 2008 | 6 | Oakland Raiders |
| Jamey Richard | 2008 | 7 | Indianapolis Colts |
| James Starks | 2010 | 6 | Green Bay Packers |
| Josh Thomas | 2011 | 5 | Dallas Cowboys |
| Steven Means | 2013 | 5 | Tampa Bay Buccaneers |
| Khalil Mack | 2014 | 1 | Oakland Raiders |
| Kristjan Sokoli | 2015 | 6 | Seattle Seahawks |
| Mason Schreck | 2017 | 7 | Cincinnati Bengals |
| K. J. Osborn | 2020 | 5 | Minnesota Vikings |
| Malcolm Koonce | 2021 | 3 | Las Vegas Raiders |
| Red Murdock | 2026 | 7 | Denver Broncos |

- Khalil Mack was drafted by the Raiders fifth overall in the 2014 NFL Draft. Mack holds the all-time NCAA record for forced fumbles and is also tied for career tackles for loss in the NCAA. In 2015, he became the first first-team All-Pro in NFL history to be elected in two different positions in the same year, as a defensive end and outside linebacker. Mack was named the NFL Defensive Player of the Year for the 2016 season.
- Red Murdock was drafted by the Denver Broncos with the 257th pick of the 2026 NFL draft, making him that year's Mr. Irrelevant.

=== Undrafted NFL players ===
| Name | Position | Years played |
|---|---|---|
| Jim Ailinger | OL | 1924 |
| John Stofa | QB | 1966–1970 |
| Ramon Guzman | LB | 2007 |
| Drew Willy | QB | 2009 |
| Mike Newton | S | 2010–2012 |
| Naaman Roosevelt | WR | 2010–2013 |
| Branden Oliver | RB | 2014–2018 |
| Jake Schum | P | 2015–2016 |
| Joe Licata | QB | 2016 |
| Matt Weiser | TE | 2016 |
| John Kling | T | 2016 |
| Jordan Johnson | RB | 2017 |
| Roubbens Joseph | T | 2017 |
| Demone Harris | DE | 2018–present |
| Tyree Jackson | QB/TE | 2019–2025 |
| Anthony Johnson | WR | 2019–2021 |
| Chuck Harris | DE | 2019–present |
| Cam Lewis | CB | 2019–present |
| James O'Hagan | C | 2019 |
| Evin Ksiezarczyk | OL | 2020–present |
| Ledarius Mack | DE | 2020–2022 |
| Jaret Patterson | RB | 2021–present |
| Kayode Awosika | OT | 2021–present |
| Ja'Marcus Ingram | CB | 2022–present |
| Joe Andreessen | LB | 2024–present |
| Shaun Dolac | LB | 2025–present |

=== Other notable players ===
- Jim McNally, longtime football assistant coach in college and NFL
- Paul Snyder Sr., businessman and eventual owner of the Buffalo Braves basketball team
- Brent Pry, Virginia Tech football head coach

== Broadcasting ==
WWKB acquired the broadcast rights to Bulls games for the 2014 season. Former WIVB-TV sports anchor Paul Peck on play-by-play and former Navy quarterback Jim Kubiak on color commentary are expected to return. The Bulls previously aired their games on WHLD (2013), WECK (2008–12) and WGR.

A separate feed is available from the student Part 15 radio station, WRUB.

As a member of the Mid-American Conference, ESPN Inc. holds television rights to UB Bulls games. They are typically only broadcast online via ESPN3, with local radio personality Sal Capaccio on play-by-play, with some games sub-leased to American Sports Network's Buffalo affiliate, WNYO-TV.

== All-time vs. MAC teams ==
This table includes all MAC games from the 1999 NCAA Division I-A football season, the year the Bulls joined the Mid-American Conference, through the 2022 NCAA Division I FBS football season.

| Opponent | Games | Win | Loss | Pct. | PF | PA | First meeting | Last meeting | Streak | Most recent win |
|---|---|---|---|---|---|---|---|---|---|---|
| Akron | 22 | 11 | 11 | .500 | 574 | 505 | 1999 | 2021 | W 5 | 2021, 45–10 |
| Ball State | 11 | 2 | 9 | .182 | 224 | 316 | 2000 | 2017 | W 1 | 2017, 40–24 |
| Bowling Green | 20 | 8 | 12 | .400 | 257 | 374 | 2000 | 2022 | W 1 | 2020, 38–7 |
| Central Michigan | 11 | 3 | 8 | .273 | 234 | 277 | 1999 | 2022 | L 1 | 2019, 43–20 |
| Eastern Michigan | 10 | 4 | 6 | .400 | 299 | 274 | 2001 | 2019 | W 3 | 2022, 50–31 |
| Kent State | 21 | 10 | 11 | .476 | 530 | 530 | 1999 | 2022 | L 2 | 2020, 70–41 |
| Miami (OH) | 24 | 9 | 15 | .375 | 541 | 735 | 1999 | 2022 | W 1 | 2022, 24–20 |
| Northern Illinois | 13 | 1 | 12 | .077 | 255 | 502 | 1999 | 2020 | L 1 | 2020, 49–30 |
| Ohio | 23 | 9 | 14 | .391 | 542 | 672 | 1999 | 2022 | L 1 | 2021, 27–26 |
| Toledo | 8 | 4 | 4 | .500 | 221 | 277 | 2003 | 2022 | W 3 | 2022, 34–27 |
| Western Michigan | 10 | 2 | 8 | .200 | 261 | 332 | 1999 | 2021 | L 3 | 2013, 33–0 |
| Central Florida (2002–2004) | 3 | 1 | 2 | .333 | 79 | 84 | 2002 | 2004 | W 1 | 2004, 48–20 |
| Marshall (1999–2004) | 6 | 0 | 6 | .000 | 82 | 280 | 1999 | 2004 | L 6 | – |
| Temple (2007–2011) | 5 | 2 | 3 | .400 | 85 | 148 | 2007 | 2011 | L 3 | 2008, 30–28 |
| UMass (2012–2015) | 4 | 3 | 1 | .750 | 128 | 74 | 2012 | 2015 | L 1 | 2014, 41–21 |

== Future non-conference opponents ==
Announced schedules as of April 10, 2026.

| 2026 | 2027 | 2028 | 2029 | 2030 | 2031 | 2032 | 2033 | 2034 | 2035 | 2036 | 2037 | 2038 |
|---|---|---|---|---|---|---|---|---|---|---|---|---|
| Albany | at Michigan | at Ohio State | Stonehill | Wagner | at Jacksonville State | | | | | | at Army | Army |
| at FIU | FIU | Stony Brook | at Illinois | at Miami (FL) | Delaware | | | | | | | |
| at Penn State | Central Connecticut | Jacksonville State | at Delaware | Louisiana | | | | | | | | |
| Robert Morris | at Troy | at UConn | UConn | | | | | | | | | |

== See also ==
- American football in the United States
- College football
