= 1903 Buffalo football team =

American college football season

1903 Buffalo football
- Conference: Independent
- Record: 4–4
- Head coach: Ray Turnbull (1st season)
- Captain: David Lawton
- Home stadium: Buffalo Athletic Field

1903 Eastern college football independents records
	Conf.			Overall
Team	W	L	T	W		L		T
Princeton		–		11	–	0	–	0
Yale		–		11	–	1	–	0
Columbia		–		9	–	1	–	0
Dartmouth		–		9	–	1	–	0
Geneva		–		9	–	1	–	0
Holy Cross		–		8	–	2	–	0
Temple		–		4	–	1	–	0
Washington & Jefferson		–		8	–	2	–	0
Lehigh		–		9	–	2	–	1
Harvard		–		9	–	3	–	0
Penn		–		9	–	3	–	0
Army		–		6	–	2	–	1
Carlisle		–		6	–	2	–	1
Amherst		–		7	–	3	–	0
Lafayette		–		7	–	3	–	0
Cornell		–		6	–	3	–	1
Colgate		–		4	–	2	–	1
Penn State		–		5	–	3	–	0
Swarthmore		–		6	–	4	–	0
Dickinson		–		7	–	5	–	0
Brown		–		5	–	4	–	1
Syracuse		–		5	–	4	–	0
Fordham		–		1	–	1	–	0
Franklin & Marshall		–		5	–	5	–	1
Buffalo		–		4	–	4	–	0
Rutgers		–		4	–	4	–	1
Delaware		–		4	–	4	–	0
Villanova		–		2	–	2	–	0
Bucknell		–		4	–	5	–	0
Vermont		–		4	–	5	–	0
Tufts		–		5	–	8	–	0
Wesleyan		–		3	–	6	–	1
Springfield Training School		–		1	–	3	–	1
NYU		–		2	–	5	–	0
New Hampshire		–		2	–	6	–	1
Pittsburgh College		–		1	–	5	–	1
Western U. Penn.		–		1	–	8	–	1

The 1903 Buffalo football team represented the University of Buffalo as an independent during the 1903 college football season. The team coach was Ray Turnbull and the team was 4–4 overall for the year.

== Schedule ==
Date	Opponent	Site	Result
October 3	Westminster (PA)	Buffalo Athletic Field; Buffalo, NY	W 14–0
October 10	Masten Park High School	Buffalo Athletic Field; Buffalo, NY	W 10–0
October 17	at Niagara	Niagara Falls, NY	W 17–6
October 31	at Allegheny	Meadville, PA	L 0–23
November 3	Hobart	Buffalo Athletic Field; Buffalo, NY	L 0–12
November 7	at Rochester	Rochester, NY	L 0–47
November 14	Niagara	Buffalo Athletic Field; Buffalo, NY	W 10–6
November 26	Oakdale Athletic Club	Buffalo Athletic Field; Buffalo, NY	L 0–33
