= Ray Turnbull (American football) =

American football player, coach, and physician (1880–1939)

Biographical details
- Born: August 29, 1880; Elmira, New York, U.S.
- Died: August 13, 1939 (aged 58); Elmira, New York, U.S.

Playing career
- 1901: Cornell
- 1903: Buffalo
- Position: End

Coaching career (HC unless noted)
- 1903: Buffalo

Head coaching record
- Overall: 4–4

Raymond Alexander Turnbull (August 29, 1880 – August 13, 1939) was an American college football player, coach and physician. He served as player/coach at University of Buffalo for one season in 1903, compiling a record of 4–4.

Turnbull was born on August 29, 1880, in Elmira, New York, to William P. and Jenny E. Turnbull. He was educated in public schools of Elmira and Ithaca, New York. He attended Cornell University, where he played college football as an end in 1901. He earned a medical degree from the University of Buffalo in 1904 and practiced medicine in Elmira.

Turnbull served in the United States Army during World War I as a major and chief surgeon of the 107th Infantry Regiment in France. He died on August 13, 1939, in Elmira, after being hospitalized for a heart ailment.

== Head coaching record ==
Year	Team	Overall	Conference	Standing	Bowl/playoffs
Buffalo (Independent) (1903)
1903	Buffalo	4–4			
Buffalo:		4–4			
Total:		4–4			
