= Jon Jones (shot putter) =

American shot putter (born 1991)

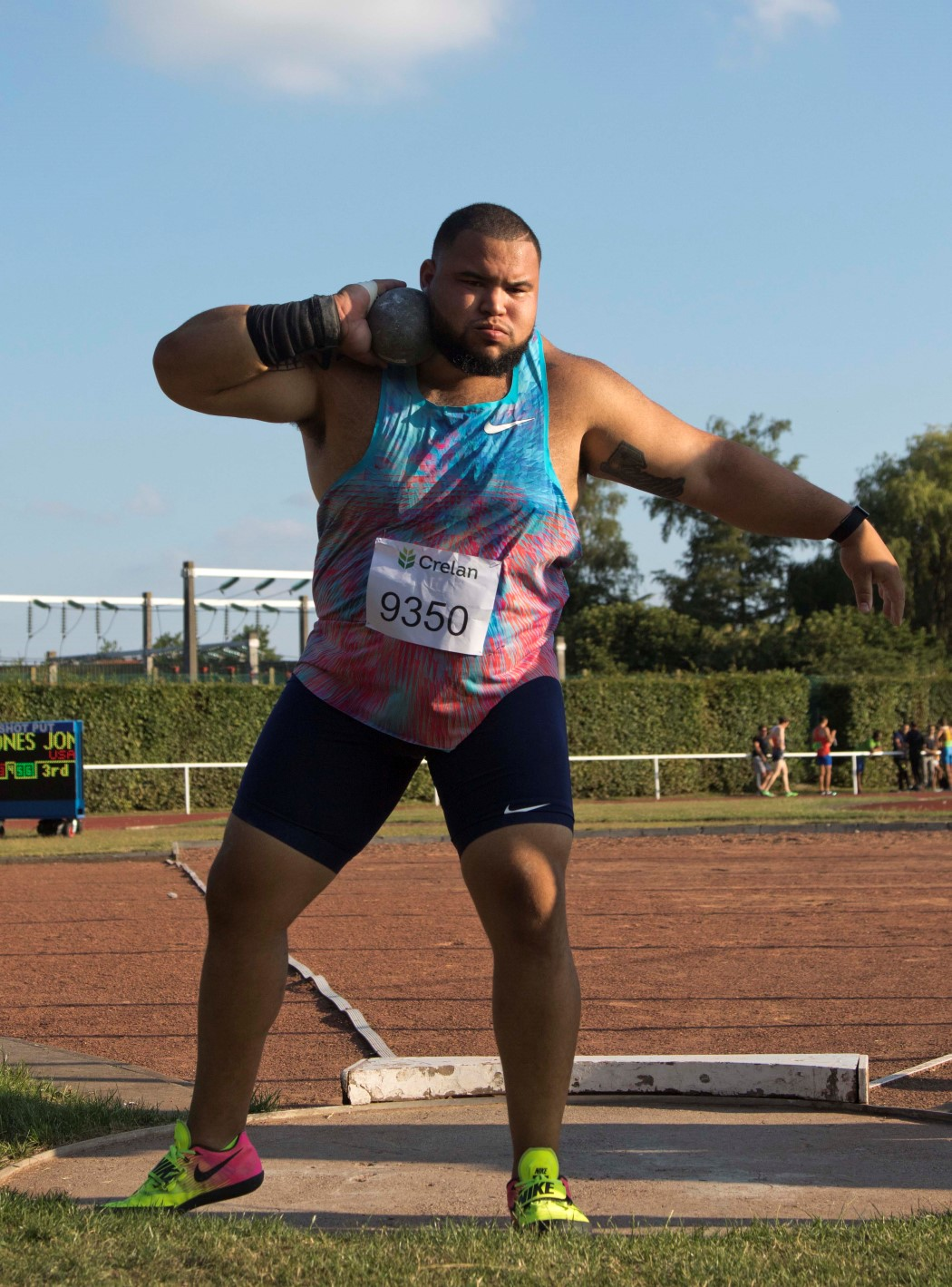
- Jones at the 2017 Guldensporenmeeting in Kortrijk, Belgium

Personal information
- Full name: Jonathan Jones
- Born: April 23, 1991
- Height: 183 cm (6 ft 0 in)
- Weight: 145 kg (320 lb)

Sport
- Country: United States
- Sport: Athletics
- Event: Shot put

Achievements and titles
- Personal best: SP: 21.63 m (2019)
Medal record
Men's athletics
Representing the United States
NACAC Championships
Gold medal – first place	2015 San José	Shot put

Jonathan Jones (born April 23, 1991) is an American former shot putter. He was the 2017 USA Indoor Track and Field Championships winner in the shot put and qualified for the 2016 World Indoor Championships, where he placed 5th. Representing the Buffalo Bulls track and field team, he won the shot put at the 2015 NCAA Division I Outdoor Track and Field Championships. He also won the shot put at the 2015 NACAC Championships.

== Career ==
At Portville High School, Jones was a four-sport athlete. He finished 5th in the shot put at the 2009 New York State Public High School Athletic Association championships and sixth in 2010, and was also a member of his school's 4 × 100 m relay. He also played on the school's gridiron football team and baseball team.

He was recruited by the University at Buffalo, but because his grades weren't sufficient Jones started for the Buffalo State Bengals track and field team in NCAA Division III, where he threw the shot put, discus throw, and weight throw. Jones was runner-up at the 2011 SUNYAC indoor and outdoor shot put championships.

Jones was able to transfer and competed for the Buffalo Bulls track and field team beginning in the 2012-13 season. At the 2013 NCAA Division I Indoor Track and Field Championships, he finished 13th in the shot put, and he improved to 4th at the 2013 NCAA Division I Outdoor Track and Field Championships.

He was 12th at the 2014 NCAA Division I Indoor Track and Field Championships and 11th at that year's 2014 NCAA Division I Outdoor Track and Field Championships. In his first senior national championships, Jones placed 4th at the 2014 USA Outdoor Track and Field Championships, just one inch behind his personal idol Reese Hoffa.

In 2015, Jones finished a career-best 3rd at the 2015 NCAA Division I Indoor Track and Field Championships. Outdoors, he won Buffalo's first national title by throwing 20.78 m to win the 2015 NCAA Division I Outdoor Track and Field Championships. Jones was able to win despite a reduced training block of about 15 throws per session to reduce injury risk. He went on to place 5th in a 20.92 m personal record at the 2015 USA Outdoor Track and Field Championships, qualifying him to represent the United States at the 2015 Pan American Games. He was 5th in the shot put finals as the 2nd American, behind Darrell Hill. At the 2015 NACAC Championships in Athletics, Jones earned his first senior international medal by winning the shot put.

Jones competed as a professional beginning in 2016, placing 4th at the New Balance Indoor Grand Prix. He was 3rd at the 2016 USA Indoor Track and Field Championships, qualifying him to represent the U.S. again at the 2016 IAAF World Indoor Championships. At the world indoor championship shot put, Jones threw his best mark of 20.31 m on his 4th attempt, fouling his next throw. As his throw as 0.22 m short of making the top-four cut, he was not given a sixth throw and finished in 5th place as the top American. Jones was 4th in his flight and advanced to the finals at the 2016 United States Olympic trials, but he did not register a mark in the final.

Jones was runner-up at the 2017 USA Indoor Track and Field Championships, throwing 20.53 m behind winner Darien Moore. However, Moore accepted an anti-doping sanction for metandienone metabolites in May for a sample he took during those championships, retroactively disqualifying him and leaving Jones as the winner. Outdoors, he finished 12th at the 2017 USA Outdoor Track and Field Championships and did not qualify for the world championships.

In 2018, Jones earned another national podium by placing 3rd at the 2018 USA Indoor Track and Field Championships. He was 9th at the 2018 USA Outdoor Track and Field Championships as he only could register one legal throw of 19.94 m in his opening three attempts.

Jones threw a shot put personal record of 21.40 m two weeks before the 2019 USA Outdoor Track and Field Championships. At the championships, he finished 4th behind Ryan Crouser, Joe Kovacs, and Darrell Hill. He competed in Europe at the Hanžeković Memorial finishing 10th, and represented the U.S. at The Match Europe v USA, placing 7th in the shot put.

Jones placed 6th at the 2020 Millrose Games and 7th at the 2020 USA Indoor Track and Field Championships. He did not compete outdoors that year.

== Personal life ==
Jones was born on April 23, 1991. His uncle Jack Holcomb was also a thrower who held his high school's record in the shot put. His mother Haley Holcomb-Hones was on permanent disability, and lost her utilities, gave up her vehicle, and went without food to support Jones during his career.

Jones attended Portville High School in Portville, New York. He then attended Buffalo State University and the University at Buffalo with a major in psychology. He worked part-time at Dick's Sporting Goods and was part of the Velaasa club while throwing professionally.

In 2025, Jones was inducted into the Buffalo Bulls hall of fame.
