= Buffalo Bulls track and field =

American college track and field team

- University: University at Buffalo
- Head coach: Vicki Mitchell
- Conference: MAC
- Location: Buffalo, New York
- Outdoor track: UB Stadium
- Nickname: Bulls
- Colors: Royal blue and white

The Buffalo Bulls track and field team is the track and field program that represents University at Buffalo. The Bulls compete in NCAA Division I as a member of the Mid-American Conference. The team is based in Buffalo, New York, at the UB Stadium.

The program is coached by Vicki Mitchell. The track and field program officially encompasses four teams because the NCAA considers men's and women's indoor track and field and outdoor track and field as separate sports.

Shot putter Jon Jones earned the first NCAA Division I title for the Bulls by winning the 2015 NCAA Division I Outdoor Track and Field Championships. He became the university's first national champion in any sport. The team's coach Vicki Mitchell was a competitive distance runner before joining as an assistant coach, eventually being promoted to the head role after 15 years.

== Postseason ==
As of August 2025, a total of 4 men and 1 women have achieved individual first-team All-American status for the team at the Division I men's outdoor, women's outdoor, men's indoor, or women's indoor national championships (using the modern criteria of top-8 placing regardless of athlete nationality).

First team NCAA All-Americans
Team	Championships	Name	Event	Place	Ref.
Women's	2010 Outdoor	Kristy Woods	Shot put	3rd	
Men's	2011 Indoor	Rob Golabek	Shot put	8th	
Men's	2012 Indoor	Rob Golabek	Shot put	7th	
Men's	2013 Outdoor	Jonathan Jones	Shot put	4th	
Men's	2014 Indoor	Mike Morgan	Heptathlon	7th	
Men's	2015 Indoor	Jonathan Jones	Shot put	3rd	
Men's	2015 Indoor	Mike Morgan	Heptathlon	3rd	
Men's	2015 Outdoor	Jonathan Jones	Shot put	1st	
Men's	2021 Indoor	Brandon Burke	High jump	7th	
Men's	2021 Outdoor	Brandon Burke	High jump	8th	

== See also ==
- Category:Buffalo Bulls men's track and field athletes (3)
