= Malcolm Koonce =

American football player (born 1998)

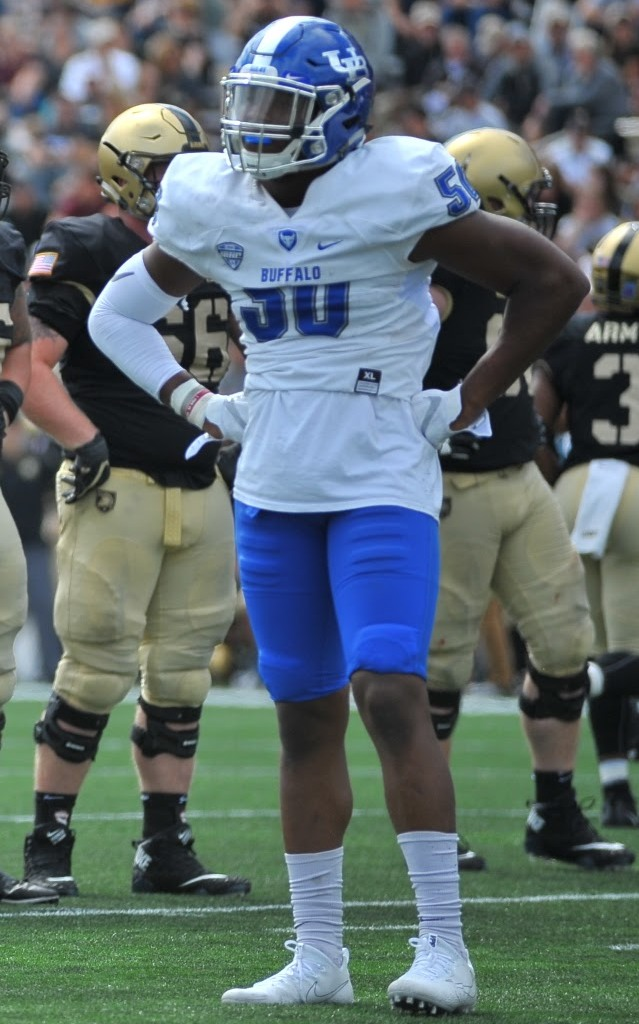
- Koonce with the Buffalo Bulls in 2017

No. 51 – Las Vegas Raiders
- Position: Defensive end
- Roster status: Active

Personal information
- Born: June 6, 1998 (age 28); Peekskill, New York, U.S.
- Listed height: 6 ft 3 in (1.91 m)
- Listed weight: 243 lb (110 kg)

Career information
- High school: Archbishop Stepinac (White Plains, New York)
- College: Buffalo (2017–2020)
- NFL draft: 2021: 3rd round, 79th overall pick

Career history
- Las Vegas Raiders (2021–present)

Awards and highlights
- 2× First-team All-MAC (2019, 2020); 2019 Bahamas Bowl MVP

Career NFL statistics as of 2025
- Total tackles: 85
- Sacks: 14.5
- Forced fumbles: 4
- Stats at Pro Football Reference

Malcolm Koonce (born June 6, 1998) is an American professional football defensive end for the Las Vegas Raiders of the National Football League (NFL). He played college football for the Buffalo Bulls and was selected by the Raiders in the third round of the 2021 NFL draft.

== Early life ==
Koonce grew up in Peekskill, New York, and attended Archbishop Stepinac High School. Although his primary sport at first was rugby, he switched his focus to football after realizing that it could earn him a college scholarship. In 2015, he led Stepinac to a New York State Catholic High School Athletic Association championship.

After graduating, he completed a post-graduate year at Milford Academy in New Berlin, New York.

== College career ==
Koonce was a member of the Buffalo Bulls for four seasons. He served primarily as a backup for his first two seasons. Koonce was named first-team All-Mid-American Conference (MAC) after recording 34 tackles, 11 tackles for loss and nine sacks in his junior season. He was named the Defensive MVP of the 2019 Bahamas Bowl after a two sack performance against the Charlotte 49ers. Koonce repeated as a first-team All-MAC selection as a senior after recording 30 tackles, 6.5 tackles for loss, and five sacks after playing in six games due to the MAC's COVID-19-shortened 2020 season. He became only the fourth UB player to be invited to play in the Senior Bowl.

== Professional career ==
Pre-draft measurables
Height	Weight	Arm length	Hand span	Wingspan
6 ft 2 1/4 in (1.89 m)	249 lb (113 kg)	33 3/8 in (0.85 m)	9 5/8 in (0.24 m)	6 ft 9 in (2.06 m)
All values from Pro Day

=== 2021 ===
Koonce was selected in the third round with the 79th overall pick of the 2021 NFL draft by the Las Vegas Raiders. The Raiders had received the 79th pick used to select Koonce in a trade that sent Rodney Hudson to the Arizona Cardinals. On July 23, 2021, Koonce signed his four-year rookie contract with Las Vegas.

Koonce was activated for Week 2 against the Pittsburgh Steelers but did not appear in the game. He was next activated before Week 13 following an injury to linebacker Carl Nassib. Koonce made his NFL debut on December 5 and, despite taking the field for only seven plays on defense and four on special teams, recorded a sack of Washington quarterback Taylor Heinicke.

=== 2023 ===
Koonce had a break out year in 2023, playing opposite Maxx Crosby on the Raiders defensive line. By Week 14 against Minnesota Vikings, Koonce had roughly doubled his playing time under interim head coach Antonio Pierce. Koonce had more quarterback hits in Weeks 14-16 than he had the rest of the season combined.

Koonce had his best statistical game as a pro in a Christmas Day matchup against their division rival Kansas City Chiefs. The Raiders needed a win to keep their playoff hopes alive. Koonce harassed Chiefs quarterback Patrick Mahomes all game, finishing with career highs in pressures (8) and sacks (3).

=== 2024 ===
Koonce was placed on injured reserve on September 7, 2024 after suffering a knee injury in practice. On September 20, it was announced that the injury would end Koonce's season.

=== 2025 ===
On March 11, 2025, Koonce signed a one-year, $12 million contract extension with the Raiders. He played in all 17 games with three starts, recording 30 tackles, 4.5 sacks, and a forced fumble.

=== 2026 ===
On March 11, 2026, Koonce signed a one-year, $11 million contract extension with the Raiders.

== NFL career statistics ==
Legend
**Bold**	Career high

=== Regular season ===
Year	Team	Games		Tackles					Interceptions						Fumbles				
Year	Team	GP	GS	Cmb	Solo	Ast	Sck	TFL	Int	Yds	Avg	Lng	TD	PD	FF	Fum	FR	Yds	TD
2021	LV	5	0	3	2	1	2.0	2	0	0	0.0	0	0	0	0	0	0	0	0
2022	LV	**17**	0	9	6	3	0.0	0	0	0	0.0	0	0	0	0	0	0	0	0
2023	LV	**17**	**11**	**43**	**32**	11	**8.0**	**9**	0	0	0.0	0	0	0	**3**	0	0	0	0
2025	LV	**17**	3	30	14	**16**	4.5	6	0	0	0.0	0	0	0	1	0	0	0	0
Career		56	14	85	54	31	14.5	17	0	0	0.0	0	0	0	4	0	0	0	0
