= Thunder of the East Marching Band =

Marching band of the University at Buffalo

Thunder of the East
- School: University at Buffalo
- Location: Buffalo, New York
- Conference: MAC
- Founded: 1920; re-founded as the Thunder of the East in 1999
- Director: James Mauck
- Members: 160
- Fight song: "Victory March"
- Motto: "Power. Precision. Passion."
- Website: https://www.buffalo.edu/studentlife/life-on-campus/clubs-and-activities/search/marching-band.html

The Thunder of the East is the marching band of the University at Buffalo in the State University of New York system. UB's first marching band was created in 1920, and disbanded in 1927. It was revived in 1946, increasing in size and reputation until about 1970. It was known as "The Pride of the East." At that time, it was dissolved upon UB's departure from Division I athletics. In 1981, some UB students continued the tradition of playing music at UB's home football and basketball games by forming UB's Pep Band. In anticipation of UB's return to Division I athletics, a marching band was formed in 1999 and named, "Thunder of the East." The band debuted at the University at Buffalo Stadium on September 11, 1999. The Thunder of the East is currently led by James E. Mauck; and performs at UB's Buffalo Bulls home football games, as well as in other musical venues.

== History ==
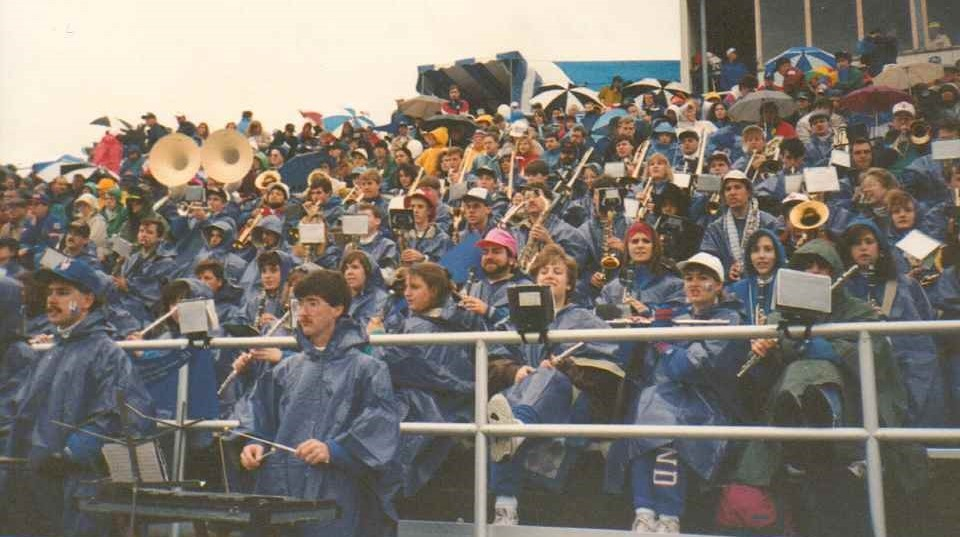
UB Pep Band at UB Homecoming Football Game vs. Hofstra, October 1992

The first marching band at the University at Buffalo was formed in 1920 by 15 students. At that time, performances were limited to a few concerts, and marching during the school's football games. The band eventually dissolved in 1927, but many attempts were made to revive it. The band was re-formed in 1946 by Gerald Marx. A saxophone player, Marx brought together around 50 players to play and march at university football and basketball games. They also played concerts around the area, including one in Kleinhans Music Hall, home of the Buffalo Philharmonic Orchestra. In 1952, The Air Force ROTC Band took over the marching duties on campus, leaving the university band only non-marching duties.

In 1956, the newly formed music department at the university took over the marching band after the ROTC band failed to meet expectations during its existence, and upon the insistence of UB's president, Clifford C. Furnas. Robert Mols, PhD, led this new band, writing the current fight song, "Victory," that is heard at football games and basketball games today. Mols wanted the band to be comparable to Ivy League marching bands, creating uniforms that resembled uniforms of the Ivy Leaguers of the day. The band opened to much success and fanfare thanks to the efforts of Mols and the band's many weeks of practice before their premiere. In 1959, Buffalo Philharmonic member Lowell Shaw took over leading the marching band; Mols went back to conducting the university Concert Band. In 1961, the band again changed leaders with Frank J. Cipolla at the helm. The University purchased new uniforms and a new version of the Alma Mater was written. It was at this time that the band acquired its first nickname, "Pride of the East." In 1968, the band had the distinction of being the first group on campus to move to the new North Campus to what is now Bissell Hall. In 1969, the band marched in Richard Nixon's inauguration parade. Between 1961 and the early 1970s, the band grew from only 50 members to over 300 members. The university joined the SUNY system in 1962, eventually leading to the elimination of the football team and with it the need for a marching band.

In 1981, a small group of students created a pep band for the then Division III football team. Throughout the 1980s and 1990s, the band grew to become a Student Association group, so beginning the University at Buffalo Blue Noise Pep Band. During this time, there was talk of restarting the marching band, however it never developed. In 1999, football returned to Division I. With this, the university decided a marching band was again a necessity. Mark Flynn was made the director, and with the efforts of Kappa Kappa Psi, many local high schools, and Student Affairs, the Thunder of the East made its debut on September 11, 1999. In 2000, the band began its second season with new uniforms and new words to Victory March written by Mols, the original composer. It's believed that there were never any words for the original song. In the fall of 2001, the band made its first road trip in nearly 30 years to West Point to cheer on the Buffalo Bulls at Army's Michie Stadium.

== Instrumentation ==
The Thunder of the East is a Drum Corps style band that incorporates traditional marching band instrumentation. Instruments included are:

- Piccolo/Flute
- Clarinet
- Alto/Tenor/Baritone Saxophone
- Trumpet
- Mellophone (Horn in F)
- Trombone
- Baritone
- Tuba (Contra)
- Drumline – Snare/Tenor/Bass Drums and Cymbals

== Visual section ==
The Thunder of the East also has a Visual section to add artistic style to their performances, including:

- Color Guard
- Featured Twirlers
- UB Dazzlers Dance Team

== Rehearsal ==
Practices are held three times per week (Mon/Wed/Fri 6:30 pm – 8:30 pm) during the fall semester. Students in the band may also take MUS 130, an optional two-credit course. Rehearsals are held at Kunz Field, the former football stadium, UB Stadium or indoors at Baird hall, home of the university's music department.

== University affiliation ==
The Marching Band is now associated with Student Life, and together with the Pep Band, comprise the Athletic Bands. The band is not part of the Music Department at the university. However, all students in the band are given the option of taking MUS 130, a 2-credit course.

== Band camp ==
Members of the Thunder of the East arrive one week prior to the start of UB's fall semester. Students are able to move into their assigned dorms prior to camp, allowing them to avoid the rush and chaos of university-wide move in day. During the week of Fun in the Sun, members are taught the marching style of the Thunder of the East, fitted for uniforms, and begin to learn that season's music and field show. Also during the time members of the drumline and Dazzlers Dance Team audition for their spots.

== Organization ==
=== Director ===
James E. Mauck has been the director for the Thunder of the East since 2002. He received his undergraduate and master's degrees in music performance at Indiana University of Pennsylvania, and is currently working towards a PhD in Music Education. He is the head of the Department of Athletic Bands at the University at Buffalo. This includes the Thunder of the East and the Blue Noise Pep Band.

=== Instructors ===
The band acquires help from several additional instructors.

=== Drum majors ===
The drum majors for the Thunder of the East are the on-field commanders of the band, responsible for instructing proper marching technique and rehearsal etiquette. The drum majors primary responsibility is conducting the band. Drum majors are chosen by the director after a series of auditions, held in the spring semester. The current drum majors for the 2024 season are Matthew Gonzalez, Timothy Washington, and Earl Robert "Robbie" Kipler.

=== Officers ===
The band is also led by a number of students that are elected at the end of the marching band season for the following year. Until recent history, these officers were the Commanding Officer (CO), Horn Sergeant (2nd in Command), 2 Drum Majors, 2 Executive Officers, and a Social Media chair. The band has opted for more traditional roles in recent years (President, etc).

=== Section leaders ===
Each section has a student leader that focuses on their specified instrument. Their responsibilities include helping the freshman learn the band's unique style of marching, helping the instructors teach the music to their appropriate section, and providing leadership under the instructors and officers. Section Leaders are selected by the Staff and Elected Officers.

== Performances ==
The Thunder of the East performs many times throughout the year. The band performs at every home football game, travels to at least one away game per year, and attends other events, such as parades and exhibition performances at New York State Field Band competitions. The Thunder of the East also accompanies the team to any/all Post-Season Performances.

In 2008, the band followed the Bulls on their historic run to the MAC Championship and their first-ever Bowl Game.

In 2022, the band performed at halftime at the Buffalo Bills' home opener against the Tennessee Titans, then again in 2023 against the Las Vegas Raiders

=== Game day ===
The band starts game day by warming up and performing a pre-game concert in front of Slee Hall, the university's concert hall. The sounds from this performance can be heard around most of the North Campus, in effect being the first of many pre-game "pep rallies" that the band will perform. The band then marches down the road, playing in parade formation, to UB Stadium where it will perform at 1–2 different tailgate parties and the Blue and White Club. While marching, the band plays selections from its halftime show. When the band arrives at the stadium, it takes the field to perform a pre-game show, but not before the members enjoy some pre-game glizzies, water, and an apple. The band then goes to its section in the stadium, next to the student section and plays typical game tunes along with some of its halftime show. At halftime, the band performs its show facing the home crowd on the west side of the stadium. After the performance, the band returns to the stands to again join the crowd cheering on the Bulls. After the game, the band performs its halftime show facing the east side of the stadium, consisting mostly of students.

=== Travel ===
The band travels to away games and many other events. Recent trips include:

- Penn State UB Bulls vs. Penn State Nittany Lions Football
- New York City Columbus Day Parade
- New York State Field Band Conference (NYSFBC) Championships at the Carrier Dome
- Lewiston, New York Peach Festival Parade
- Lancaster, New York NYSFBC competition
- University of Pittsburgh, UB Bulls vs. Pitt Panthers Football
- Detroit, MI, Mid-American Conference Championship – Ford Field
- Toronto, Ontario, Canada, International Bowl – Rogers Centre
- 2013 Famous Idaho Potato Bowl, Boise, Idaho

== Uniform ==
In the early 2010s, the Thunder of the East wore uniforms consisting of the below:

1. Black aussie hats, each with 1 white feather*

2. Black, white, and blue jackets with a "UB" emblem on the chest

3. Gauntlets

4. White gloves

5. Black jumpsuits

6. Black, Shiny Dinkle-brand marching shoes

- Those playing tuba (contra) were exempt from this style of hat, and instead wore UB baseball caps

In 2017, the uniform was retired and the band debuted new uniforms, which are worn to this day. They consist of the below:

1. Blue shakos with silver plumes

2. White and blue jackets, with a "UB" emblem on the chest and "BUFFALO" vertically

3. Grey jumpsuits

4. White gloves

When weather conditions are poor, the Thunder of the East may wear long, black raincoats that extend past the knees.

== Song lyrics ==
=== Victory March ===
The following are lyrics to UB's "Victory March" song:

Traditional lyrics: "Fight, fight for Buffalo; Be proud to fight for your dear Blue and White. So Hit 'em high, Hit 'em low, Throw 'em high, Throw 'em low; Fight for your dear old Bulls. (Go! Bulls! Go!) Cheer, cheer for Buffalo; Our spirit will be with you 'til the end... So play the game as best you can; For the glory of our dear Buffalo."

Current lyrics: "Fight, Fight for Buffalo; Be proud to fight for our dear Blue and White; So, thunder through, Go Blue! Give a cheer, never fear! Don't stop 'til we have won! (Go! Bulls! Go!) Cheer, cheer for Buffalo; Our spirit will be with you 'till the end; So show your colors proud and true; For the glory of our dear Buffalo!"

=== Alma Mater ===
Following are lyrics to UB's "Alma Mater" song:

"Verse 1: The pride of our spirit and tradition; Our Alma Mater's truth and name declare. Celebrate our history and wisdom; O' let us all prepare to sing her glory.

Refrain: To Buffalo all hail to thee; Noble and strong it's our University! To Blue and White pledge loyalty; Singing I will always remember thee!

Verse 2: We'll ever keep our standards high; And sing UB's praises to the sky. Receiving the finest education; Our knowledge we impart unto the nations.

Verse 3: Our friends we've made with ties that bind; A union of our spirit heart and mind. Together we'll continue life's journey; O' may dear Buffalo for ever be."

== See also ==
- Buffalo Bulls
- University at Buffalo
- University at Buffalo Stadium
