= Victor E. Bull =

Mascot for the University at Buffalo

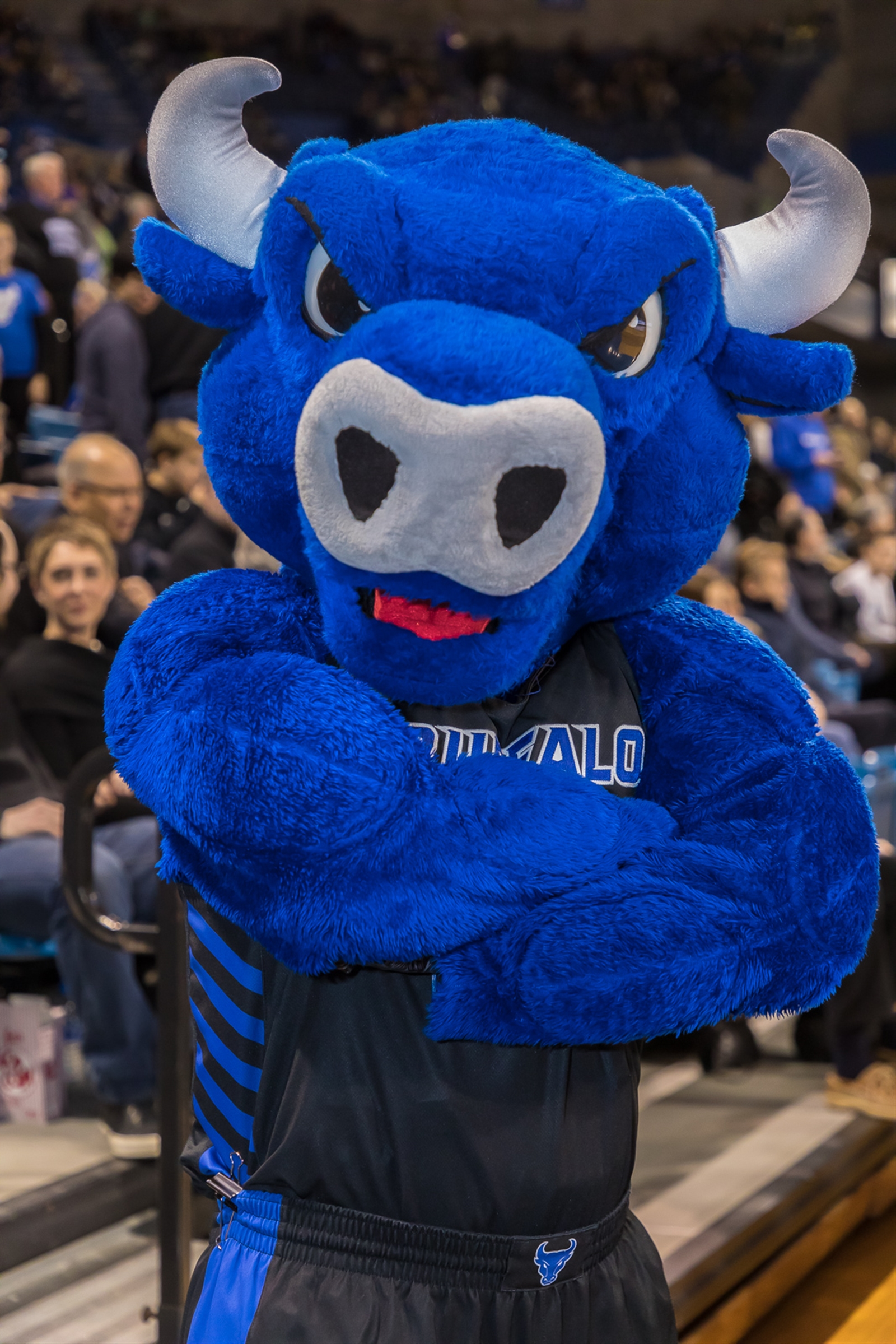
- Victor E. Bull in 2019
- University: State University of New York at Buffalo
- Conference: MAC
- Description: Anthropomorphic blue bull
- Origin of name: Victory
- First seen: 1997
- Related mascot(s): Boscoe (bison head) (1934–1957); Buster (live bull) and sons (1957–1970); Woody Bully (person) (1980s–1997)

Victor E. Bull is the mascot for the Buffalo Bulls, the athletic teams of the University at Buffalo in Buffalo, New York. Victor is an anthropomorphic blue bull. Victor performs at all Buffalo Bulls home football and basketball games.

In 2002, Victor E. Bull was chosen as a member of the Capital One All America Mascot Team. Victor was featured in a national television spot along with eleven other national collegiate mascots, and was given a chance to compete for the Capital One Bowl mascot of the year as part of the Capital One Mascot Challenge. The mascot contest was open to all NCAA Division I-A and I-AA school mascots representing collegiate football programs. The twelve finalists were chosen by a panel of judges composed of representatives from ESPN, Capital One, and the mascot community. The judging criteria included fan interaction, good sportsmanship, and community service involvement. The winner of the 2002 Capital One Mascot Challenge was Monte from the University of Montana.

In 2013, Victor reached the Elite Eight stage of the SUNY Mascot Madness competition, earning 49% of the vote against Baxter, the Binghamton Bearcat. Victor was defeated by Baxter in a close race.

== History ==
Buffalo's first unofficial mascot was a 175-pound bison head nicknamed "Boscoe," which was given to the students by two alumni in 1934 at the first Homecoming football game. It is unknown where the location of the bison head is now.

In 1957, Buffalo acquired its first live mascot when Mike Todd and Elizabeth Taylor gave UB's cheerleaders a seven-month-old black Angus-Irish Dexter bull named "Buster." Dexters originated in Ireland, and are miniature cattle. Buster was born on a farm in Western New York, and was presented to the school as part of Todd's and Taylor's visit with Buffalo Mayor Steven Pankow to celebrate Buffalo's 125th anniversary.

As Buster matured, he became increasingly bad-tempered, and was replaced by Buster II and a whole line of successive Busters, all raised by an Elma, New York farmer named Chester Malach. The live mascot tradition at Buffalo continued until 1970, when the university discontinued NCAA Division I football. Prior to the creation of Victor E. Bull, Buffalo used a brown anthropomorphic bull character named "Wooly Bully."

In 1997, as part of Buffalo's preparation to return to the NCAA Division I, the Buffalo athletics department held a "name the mascot" contest with the help of the university newspaper. The name "Victor E. Bull" was submitted by undergraduate student, Rustie Hill, and was selected as the winning entry. Shortly thereafter, in 1997, the department adopted the anthropomorphic Victor E. Bull as the school's new mascot. At the football home opener that year, Hill was invited out onto the field with Victor E. Bull as he was introduced to the fans.

Victoria S. Bull ("Vicki") was introduced as Victor's sister in 2001, but has not been seen for many years.

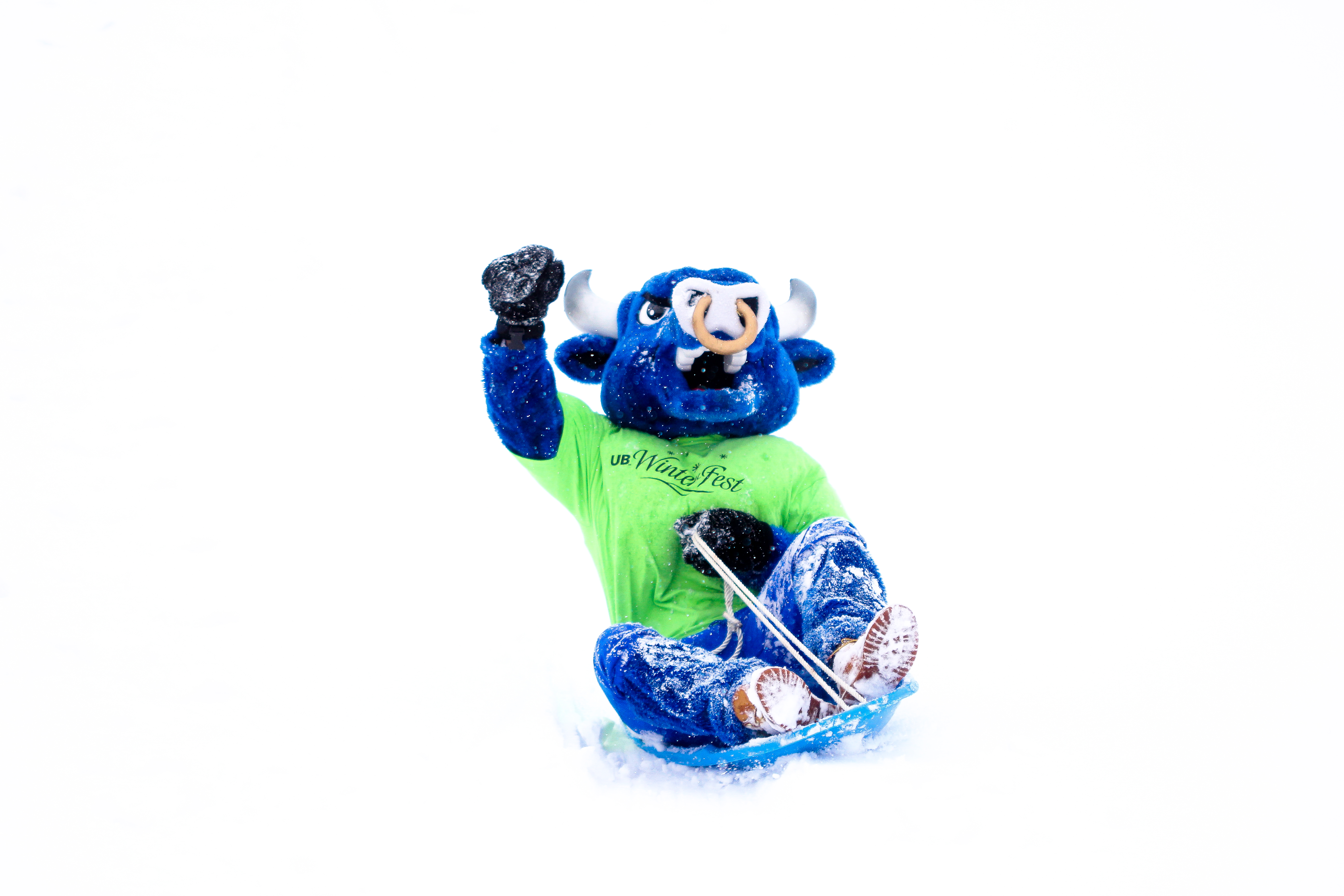
A sledding Victor E. Bull at UB Winterfest 2014

== Activities ==
Victor also participates in other campus-related activities in addition to appearing at football and basketball games. In 2000, he was present at a Kids Safety Day sponsored by the Chiropractic Center in Cheektowaga, New York. On Orientation Day at UB in 2008 for incoming freshmen, Victor led the students and their parents by singing UB's fight song. Victor was also present, mingling with fans, at the 32nd Empire State Games that were held at UB in 2010. In 2011, Victor was active in the Recycle Mania Tournament at UB; and in 2012, he participated in an event to help raise cancer awareness.

On April 1, 2025, Victor released his debut album Victory. The 11-track album features notable UB alumni and is available to stream on YouTube. The album’s lyrics, available on Genius, describe what it’s like to be a UB student. The album description says that Victory is about coming into a new place, finding a community there, and showing appreciation for the people that have made Victor’s UB experience one to remember.

- There are a limited quantity of signed CD copies in existence, which were distributed through a giveaway on Instagram.

== In real life ==
Real life finds Victor E. Bull as a male UB student. He works out and plays sports to stay fit in order to be in costume for several hours for each event he works. Victor stated that wearing the costume causes him to sweat within a few minutes, so he is sure to exercise in his spare time, and stay hydrated during his events. The temperature inside the suit is 20–50 degrees warmer than the actual temperature outside the suit. Victor is compensated for his work by the UB Athletics Department.
