= Ramon Guzman =

American football player (born 1982)

No. 52
- Position: Linebacker

Personal information
- Born: September 29, 1982 (age 44); The Bronx, New York, U.S.
- Listed height: 6 ft 2 in (1.88 m)
- Listed weight: 232 lb (105 kg)

Career information
- College: Buffalo
- NFL draft: 2007: undrafted

Career history
- Indianapolis Colts (2007); Montreal Alouettes (2009–2011)

Awards and highlights
- 2× Grey Cup champion (2009, 2010)

Career NFL statistics
- Total tackles: 14
- Fumble recoveries: 2
- Stats at Pro Football Reference
- Stats at CFL.ca (archive)

Ramon L. Guzman (born September 29, 1982) is an American former professional football player who was a linebacker in the National Football League (NFL) and Canadian Football League (CFL). He played college football for the Buffalo Bulls and was signed by the NFL's Indianapolis Colts as an undrafted free agent in 2007. He played in the CFL for the Montreal Alouettes.

On May 7, 2012, he was released by the Alouettes.
