= 2019 Bahamas Bowl =

Postseason college football bowl game

2019 Makers Wanted Bahamas Bowl
- 6th Bahamas Bowl
Buffalo Bulls	Charlotte 49ers
(7–5)	(7–5)
MAC	C–USA
31	9
Head coach: Lance Leipold	Head coach: Will Healy
	1	2	3	4	Total
Buffalo	7	10	7	7	31
Charlotte	0	0	6	3	9
- Date: December 20, 2019
- Season: 2019
- Stadium: Thomas Robinson Stadium
- Location: Nassau, Bahamas
- MVP: Jaret Patterson (RB, Buffalo) & Malcolm Koonce (DE, Buffalo)
- Favorite: Buffalo by 7
- Referee: Wayne Winkler (Sun Belt)
- Attendance: 13,547
- Payout: US$225,000

United States TV coverage
- Network: ESPN
- Announcers: Steve Levy (play-by-play), Greg McElroy (analyst), Dianna Russini (sideline)

The 2019 Bahamas Bowl was a college football bowl game played on December 20, 2019, with kickoff at 2:00 p.m. EST on ESPN. It was the 6th edition of the Bahamas Bowl, and the first of the 2019–20 bowl games concluding the 2019 FBS football season. Sponsored by the Chicago suburb of Elk Grove Village, Illinois, the game was officially known as the Makers Wanted Bahamas Bowl. Behind 173 rushing yards from Bulls running back Jaret Patterson, Buffalo defeated Charlotte, 31–9.

== Teams ==
The game was played between the Charlotte 49ers from Conference USA (C–USA) and the Buffalo Bulls from the Mid-American Conference (MAC). This was the first time the Bulls and 49ers played against each other.

=== Buffalo Bulls ===
Buffalo entered the bowl with a 7–5 record (5–3 in conference). The Bulls finished their regular season in a three-way tie for second place in the East Division of the MAC. This was Buffalo's fourth appearance in a bowl game; they were 0–3 in prior bowls, most recently appearing in the 2018 Dollar General Bowl.

=== Charlotte 49ers ===
Charlotte entered the bowl with a 7–5 record (5–3 in conference). The 49ers finished their regular season in fourth place in the East Division of C–USA. This was Charlotte's first postseason game in school history.

== Game summary ==
2019 Makers Wanted Bahamas Bowl

Quarter	1	2	3	4	Total
Buffalo	7	10	7	7	31
Charlotte	0	0	6	3	9

at Thomas Robinson Stadium • Nassau, Bahamas

- Date: Friday, December 20, 2019
- Game time: 2:00 p.m. EST
- Game weather: Mostly cloudy • Temperature: 77 °F (25 °C) • Wind: ENE 26 mph
- Game attendance: 13,547
- Referee: Wayne Winkler
- TV announcers (ESPN): Steve Levy (play-by-play), Greg McElroy (analyst) and Dianna Russini (sideline)
- ESPN game summary

Game information

First Quarter

- (9:12) BUFF – Kyle Vantrease 12 yard pass to Antonio Nunn, Alex McNulty kick (Drive: 7 plays, 61 yards, 3:11; Buffalo 7–0)

Second Quarter

- (3:33) BUFF – Kyle Vantrease 1 yard rush, Alex McNulty kick (Drive: 15 plays, 74 yards, 8:26; Buffalo 14–0)
- (1:25) BUFF – Alex McNulty 31 yard field goal (Drive: 4 plays, –2 yards, 1:55; Buffalo 17–0)

Third Quarter

- (5:22) BUFF – Jaret Patterson 6 yard rush, Alex McNulty kick (Drive: 7 plays, 43 yards, 3:45; Buffalo 24–0)
- (2:20) CHAR – Chris Reynolds 51 yard pass to Victor Tucker, 2-point pass failed (Drive: 7 plays, 75 yards, 3:02; Buffalo 24–6)

Fourth Quarter

- (10:50) CHAR – Jonathan Cruz 32 yard field goal (Drive: 10 plays, 54 yards, 5:26; Buffalo 24–9)
- (1:43) BUFF – Jaret Patterson 10 yard rush, Alex McNulty kick (Drive: 16 plays, 75 yards, 9:07; Buffalo 31–9)

=== Statistics ===
Statistics	BUFF	CHAR
First downs	19	15
Plays–yards	63–282	55–278
Rushes–yards	46–205	31–80
Passing yards	77	198
Passing: comp–att–int	8–17–1	15–24–1
Time of possession	33:12	26:48

Team	Category	Player	Statistics
Buffalo	Passing	Kyle Vantrease	8/17, 77 yards, 1 TD, 1 INT
Buffalo	Rushing	Jaret Patterson	32 carries, 173 yards, 2 TD
Buffalo	Receiving	Antonio Nunn	5 receptions, 53 yards, 1 TD
Charlotte	Passing	Chris Reynolds	15/24, 198 yards, 1 TD, 1 INT
Charlotte	Rushing	Benny Lemay	13 carries, 45 yards
Charlotte	Receiving	Tyler Ringwood	5 receptions, 64 yards
