= Kyle Cerminara =

United States Olympic wrestler

Kyle Cerminara is an American freestyle wrestler and mixed martial artist. He is a native of Lewiston, New York and attended high school at Lewiston-Porter Central School District. Cerminara attended college at the University at Buffalo and was named UB's Male Athlete of the Year twice while he was at Buffalo. In his final season there, Cerminara had a 34–3 record with a 5-0 MAC record. He was an NCAA All-American and a New York State Champion.

He is currently an assistant coach at the University of Pennsylvania and is also Head Wrestling Coach at Long Island MMA. He also is a uniformed police officer for NY State.

== Mixed martial arts record ==
Professional record breakdown
| 3 matches | 3 wins | 0 losses |
| By decision | 3 | 0 |

| Res. | Record | Opponent | Method | Event | Date | Round | Time | Location | Notes |
|---|---|---|---|---|---|---|---|---|---|
| Win | 3–0 | Ryan Williams | Decision (Unanimous) | UPC Unlimited - Up & Comers 10 | May 19, 2012 | 3 | 5:00 | Stockton, California | |
| Win | 2-0 | John Doyle | Decision (Unanimous) | LITC - Thursday Night Fights 2 | August 4, 2011 | 3 | 5:00 | Philadelphia, Pennsylvania | |
| Win | 1-0 | Ariel Sepulveda | Decision (Unanimous) | CFFC 7 - No Mercy | April 16, 2011 | 3 | 5:00 | Atlantic City, New Jersey | |
