= Mark Alnutt =

American athletic administrator

Current position
- Title: Athletic director
- Team: Buffalo
- Conference: MAC
- Annual salary: $295,000

Biographical details
- Born: January 4, 1973 (age 53)
- Education: University of Missouri

Playing career
- 1993–1995: Missouri
- Position: Linebacker / tight end

Administrative career (AD unless noted)
- 2006–2012: Missouri (associate AD)
- 2012–2015: Southeast Missouri State
- 2015–2018: Memphis (deputy AD)
- 2018–present: Buffalo

Mark Michael Alnutt (born January 4, 1973) is the current director of athletics for the University at Buffalo. He previously served as athletic director for Southeast Missouri State University, and as assistant athletic director for the University of Memphis and the University of Missouri.

Alnutt attended college at the University of Missouri, where he was a three-year letterman on the Missouri Tigers football team, playing linebacker and tight end. Alnutt was named athletic director at the University at Buffalo on March 21, 2018. On May 27, 2021, Alnutt and the University at Buffalo signed a new five-year contract for him to remain as vice president and director of athletics through May 2026.
