= List of University at Buffalo people =

This is a list of people connected to the University at Buffalo. There are more than 260,000 living alumni of UB. Notable alumni include the CEOs of Paramount Pictures and A+E Networks, two NASA astronauts, a recipient of the Edward R. Murrow Award, and a former prime minister. UB is one of the only two institutions of higher learning in the United States which were founded by a U.S. president (Millard Fillmore), the other being the University of Virginia.

== Notable faculty ==
This list includes both present and former faculty members.

=== Nobel laureates ===
Name	Known for	Relationship to University at Buffalo
Ronald H. Coase	Winner of the Nobel Prize in Economics (1991)	Professor (1951–1958)
J. M. Coetzee	South African author and winner of the Nobel Prize in Literature (2003)	Professor (1968–1971)
Carl Ferdinand Cori	Winner of the Nobel Prize in Physiology or Medicine (1947)	Adjunct assistant professor
Sir John Carew Eccles	Australian winner of the Nobel Prize in Medicine (1963) for discoveries concerning the ionic mechanisms involved in excitation and inhibition in the peripheral and central portions of the nerve cell membrane (synapse)	Distinguished Professor of Physiology and Biophysics (1968–1975)
Herbert A. Hauptman	Winner of the Nobel Prize in Chemistry (1985)	Research professor of Biophysical Sciences, director of the Medical Foundation of Buffalo

=== Award recipients ===
Name	Known for	Relationship to University at Buffalo
Om P. Bahl	Molecular biologist, honored with the Padma Bhushan in 1973 for his contributions to science and engineering	Former professor and chair of the Department of Biological Sciences
John Barth	Author known for his postmodern works, such as The Sot-Weed Factor, Lost in the Funhouse, and Chimera; winner of the National Book Award	Professor (1965–1973)
Robert Conquest	Poet honored with the Presidential Medal of Freedom	Visiting poet and lecturer in English (1959–60)
Robert Creeley	Poet and winner of the Bollingen Prize for poetry	
Andreas W. Daum	Humboldt Prize winner and historian	Professor
David Del Tredici	Composer and Pulitzer Prize winner	
Samuel R. Delany	Hugo Award-winning author and literary critic	
Carl Dennis	Poet and winner of the Pulitzer Prize for Poetry	Professor
Irving Feldman	Poet and MacArthur Foundation fellow	Professor (1962–2004)
Amit Goyal	Materials scientist, National Academy of Engineering and winner of the Ernest Orlando Lawrence Award	SUNY Distinguished Professor
Stephen McKinley Henderson	Obie Award winner and Tony Award-nominated stage and screen actor; veteran performer of playwright August Wilson's ouvre	Professor and former chair of the Department of Theater and Dance
Edmund Klein	Dermatologist and winner of the Lasker Award	Research professor
Eli Ruckenstein	Materials scientist, National Academy of Engineering and winner of the National Medal of Science	Former SUNY Distinguished Professor
Esther Takeuchi	Materials scientist, National Academy of Engineering and winner of the E. V. Murphree Award	
Richard Aaker Trythall	Composer, pianist, Guggenheim Fellow and winner of the Rome Prize	Professor (1972–1973)

=== Academia ===
Name	Known for	Relationship to University at Buffalo
Joseph A. Alutto	Provost and interim president of Ohio State University	Dean of UB School of Management (1976–1990)
Warren Bennis	President of the University of Cincinnati	Provost (1967–71)
Ludwig von Bertalanffy	Austrian biologist, one of the founders of general systems theory (GST)	Professor in Center for Theoretical Biology
Lynne Billard	President of the American Statistical Association and the International Biometric Society	Visiting professor
Jennifer Crocker	Psychologist and president of the Society for Personality and Social Psychology	Professor (1985–1995)
Tim Dean	British philosopher, author, notable in the field of contemporary queer theory	Director of the Center for the Study of Psychoanalysis and Culture
Isaac Ehrlich	Academic economist and researcher, founding editor-in-chief of the Journal of Human Capital	Chair of the Department of Economics
Marvin Farber	Chairman of Department of Philosophy 1937–1961; founder of Philosophy and Phenomenological Research	Professor of Philosophy
Michel Foucault	Historian and philosopher	Visiting professor (early 1970s)
René Girard	Historian, literary critic, and philosopher of social science	Distinguished Professor (1971–1976)
Paul Goldstein	Globally recognized expert on intellectual property law; awarding-winning author	Professor of law (1967–1975)
Charles Haynie	Long-time faculty member in interdisciplinary degree programs	An award was established in his name after his death in 2001.
Jörg Guido Hülsmann	Economist and member of the European Academy of Sciences and Arts	Former professor
Bruce Jackson	Recipient of a Guggenheim Fellowship (1971); was nominated for a Grammy (1974); president of the American Folklore Society (1984); chairman of the Board of Trustees of the American Folklore Center in the Library of Congress (1988–89, trustee 1984–89); and director, then trustee of the Newport Folk Foundation (1965–)	SUNY Distinguished Professor; Samuel P. Capen Professor of American Culture in 1997; James Agee Professor of American Culture
Robert L. Ketter	Authority on earthquake engineering research and a president of UB	First chairman of the Civil Engineering Department; dean of the College of Engineering and Applied Sciences; university president 1970–1981
Paul Kurtz	Founder and chairman of the Committee for Skeptical Inquiry (formerly the Committee for the Scientific Investigation of Claims of the Paranormal), the Council for Secular Humanism, the Center for Inquiry, and Prometheus Books	Professor emeritus of Philosophy
Olive P. Lester	Fellow of the American Psychological Association	Chair of the Psychology Department 1952 (1952–1956 acting)–1966; 1973 Distinguished Alumni Award
David Mark	Pioneer of Geographic information science	SUNY Distinguished Professor
Steve McCaffery	Canadian poet and scholar	Holds the Gray Chair at UB
Lester Walter Milbrath	Environmental academic and public intellectual	Professor of Political Science 1965–1991
Teresa Miller	Established the Office of Inclusive Excellence and created the university's first strategic diversity and inclusion plan	Vice provost for Inclusive Excellence (2014–2017)
Charles Mingus	Jazz bassist, composer, bandleader and pianist	Slee Professor of Music (1971)
Robert E. Paaswell	Interim president of the City College of New York, CEO of the Chicago Transit Authority	Professor (1964–1982)
Roswell Park	Founder of Roswell Park Cancer Institute	Former professor of Surgery
Emanuel Parzen	Statistician, pioneered the use of kernel density estimation (Parzen window)	Professor (1970–1978)
C. R. Rao	National Medal of Science honored mathematician and statistician	Professor
David Riesman	Law scholar and sociologist	Visiting professor (1937–1941)
Stephen Schanuel	Mathematician known for discovering "Schanuel's lemma"	Professor of Mathematics
Albert R. Shadle	Professor	Chairman of Biology Department (1919–1953) and professor of Biology
Bill Siemering	Director of Programming and founding program director for National Public Radio recipient of MacArthur Foundation genius grant in 1993	First professional manager of university-sponsored radio station WBFO
Leo Smit	Composer of contemporary classical music	Former professor
Harvey G. Stenger	President of Binghamton University	Former professor, dean, and provost
John J. Tyson	President of the Society for Mathematical Biology	Former professor
Craig Venter	Geneticist; founder of Celera Genomics and the J. Craig Venter Institute; on Time magazine's 2007 and 2008 lists of the 100 most influential people in the world	Former professor
Grace Wang	President of the SUNY Polytechnic Institute	Former professor
Jon Whitmore	President of Texas Tech University and San Jose State University, CEO of ACT, Inc	Dean of the Faculty of Arts and Letters and professor of theatre (1985–1990)
Ernst Witebsky	Formulated "Witebsky's postulates" that determine whether a disease entity can be regarded as an autoimmune disease	Professor and chair of the Department of Bacteriology and Immunology (1941–1967); director of the Center for Immunology (1967 until his death in 1969)
Ta-You Wu	Chinese physicist known as the "father of Chinese physics" and president of Academia Sinica (1983–1994)	Professor and chair of the Department of Physics (1968–1983)
Marvin Zelen	Biostatistician and developer of Zelen's design	Professor 1967–1977

=== Collegiate athletics ===
Name	Known for	Relationship to University at Buffalo
Mark Alnutt	Director of Athletics of the Buffalo Bulls	Athletic director (2018–present)
Warde Manuel	Director of Athletics of the University of Michigan Wolverines	Athletic director (2006–2012)
Danny White	Director of Athletics of the University of Tennessee Volunteers	Athletic director (2012–2015)

== Notable alumni ==
=== Law, politics, and government ===
Name	Known for	Relationship to University at Buffalo
Michael A. Battle	Director of the Executive Office for United States Attorneys	J.D. (1984)
Harry Bronson	New York state assemblyman	
Anthony P. Capozzi	Supervising assistant United States attorney for the Eastern District of California	B.A. (1967)
Michael Caputo	Assistant secretary of Health and Human Services for Public Affairs	
Ronald Castorina	Member of the New York Assembly	J.D.
Chaturon Chaisang	Deputy prime minister of Thailand	B.A. in Economics
Cathy Connolly	Minority leader of the Wyoming House of Representatives	M.A. (1989), J.D. (1991), Ph.D. (1992)
Zsolt Csenger-Zalán	Member of the National Assembly of Hungary	M.B.A (2004)
Daniel A. Currie	Mayor of Englewood, New Jersey	M.D. (1863)
Jack Davis	Industrialist and politician	B.S. in Industrial Engineering (1955)
Paul Dyster	Mayor of Niagara Falls, New York	B.A. (1976)
MaryEllen Elia	New York State Education Commissioner	
Eugene M. Fahey	Associate judge of the New York Court of Appeals	J.D. (1984)
Kristina Fargo	Member of the New Hampshire House of Representatives	B.S. (1985)
Eric E. Fiel	Commander of Air Force Special Operations Command	B.S. (1980)
Paul L. Friedman	Judge, United States Court of Appeals for the District of Columbia Circuit	J.D. (1968)
Julio M. Fuentes	Judge, United States Court of Appeals for the Third Circuit	J.D. (1975)
Anthony H. Gioia	United States Ambassador to Malta	B.A.
William J. Hochul Jr.	United States Attorney for the Western District of New York	J.D. (1984)
Doug Hoffer	Auditor of Vermont	J.D.
Eugene G. Hoitt	Mayor of Marlborough, Massachusetts	Matriculated in 1881
Sara Horowitz	Founder of Freelancers Union and board member of the Federal Reserve Bank of New York	J.D.
Karin Housley	Member of the Minnesota Senate	B.A. (1987)
Fred Isabella	Member of the New York State Senate	
Latoya Joyner	Member of the New York Assembly	J.D.
Ben Kallos	Member of the New York City Council	J.D.
Troy Kelley	Washington State Auditor	M.B.A., J.D.
Joseph J. Kelly	Mayor of Buffalo	J.D. (1920)
Carolyn Lamm	President of the American Bar Association	B.S. (1970)
Nicole Lee	President of TransAfrica	B.A. (2000), J.D. (2002)
Joseph Macmanus	Executive secretary of the United States Department of State	
Sheryl Gordon McCloud	Associate justice of the Washington Supreme Court	
Karen McMahon	Member of the New York State Assembly	
Rafael Rodríguez Mercado	Neurosurgeon, Secretary of Health of Puerto Rico, and chancellor of the University of Puerto Rico, Medical Sciences Campus	
Donald R. Miller	New York state assemblyman, represents the 121st district	
Stephanie Miner	Mayor of Syracuse and chair of the New York Democratic Party	J.D. (1999)
Mohamed Abdullahi Mohamed	Prime minister of Somalia and president of Somalia	B.A. in history (1993), M.A. in American Studies (2009)
Frank C. Moore	Lieutenant governor of New York	LL.B. (1923)
John Morgan	Wisconsin State Assemblyman	M.D. (1873)
Vice Admiral Robert B. Murrett	Director of National Geospatial-Intelligence Agency	B.A. in history (1975)
Albert J. Myer	Father of the U.S. Army Signal Corps	M.D. (1851)
Henry J. Nowak	Democratic member of the United States House of Representatives	J.D. (1961)
Denise O'Donnell	United States Attorney for the Western District of New York	
Marc Panepinto	Member of the New York State Senate	
Victor M. Pichardo	Member of the New York State Assembly	B.A.
Jeanine Pirro	Host of the Fox News Channel legal show Justice with Judge Jeanine, author, and New York State judge, prosecutor, and politician	B.A. (1971)
Jack Quinn	Member of the U.S. House of Representatives and president of Erie Community College	Ed.M. (1978)
Michael Ranzenhofer	Member of the New York State Senate	J.D. (1979)
Thomas Roach	Mayor of White Plains, NY	J.D. (1986)
Cordell Schachter	CIO of the U.S. Department of Transportation (2021–2025)	B.A. (1983)
Hugh B. Scott	Magistrate judge, United States District Court for the Western District of New York	
Virginia A. Seitz	United States assistant attorney general for the Office of Legal Counsel in the United States Department of Justice	J.D. (1985)
Gary L. Sharpe	Judge, United States District Court for the Northern District of New York	B.A. (1971)
John Sinatra	Judge of the United States District Court for the Western District of New York	B.A. (1993), J.D. (1996)
Michele Smith	Member of the Chicago City Council	B.A. (1976)
Michael A. Telesca	Judge, United States District Court for the Western District of New York	
Samuel Teresi	Mayor of Jamestown, New York	B.A. (1982)
Palanivel Thiagarajan	Finance Minister of Tamil Nadu	Ph.D.
Dennis Vacco	New York State attorney general (1994–1998)	
Dale Volker	New York state senator	
Raymond Walter	New York State Assemblyman	
Dave Weldon	Republican member of the United States House of Representatives	M.D.
Jeffrey White	Judge, United States District Court for the Western District of New York	
Ji Zhou	Minister of Education for the People's Republic of China (2003–2009)	M.S. (1981), Ph.D. (1984)

=== Science, technology, and engineering ===
Name	Known for	Relationship to University at Buffalo
Ellen Shulman Baker	Astronaut on the Space Shuttle Atlantis and NASA medical officer	B.A. in geology (1974)
Erich Bloch	Director of the National Science Foundation (NSF) and recipient of the National Medal of Technology and Innovation	B.S. in Electrical Engineering
Allison A. Campbell	President of the American Chemical Society	Ph.D. (1991)
Marvin Chodorow	Physicist and member of the National Academy of Sciences and the National Academy of Engineering	B.S. (1934)
Bram Cohen	Creator of the BitTorrent peer-to-peer client	
Alexander H. Flax	Chief Scientist of the U.S. Air Force and director of the National Reconnaissance Office	Ph.D. (1958)
Claire M. Fraser	President and director of the Institute for Genomic Research	Ph.D. (1981)
Seymour Gitin	Director of the Albright Institute of Archaeological Research	B.A. (1956)
Wilson Greatbach	Recipient of the Lemelson–MIT Prize and National Medal of Technology and Innovation in 1990	M.S. (1957)
Genevieve Grotjan Feinstein	Mathematician and cryptanalyst	B.A. (1936)
Robert Gundlach	Inventor of the modern photocopier	B.S. in physics (1949)
Gregory Jarvis	NASA astronaut on the Space Shuttle Challenger	B.S. (1967)
Robert F. Landel	Jet Propulsion Laboratory physical chemist noted for his contribution to development of the Williams–Landel–Ferry equation	B.A. (1950), M.A. (1951)
Jacob A. Marinsky	Chemist and co-discoverer of the element promethium	B.S. (1939)
Norman McCombs	Recipient of the National Medal of Technology and Innovation in 2013	B.S. (1968)
Robert Pound	Experimental physicist, co-discoverer of nuclear magnetic resonance in condensed matter, carried out Pound-Rebka experiment confirming gravitational time dilation, professor and chairman of the physics department at Harvard University	B.S. in physics (1941)
Janet Rideout	Scientist who discovered that azidothymidine could be used treat HIV	Ph.D. (1968)
Cynthia Rudin	Statistician and a fellow of the American Statistical Association	M.A. (1999)
Christopher Scolese	Director of NASA's Goddard Space Flight Center, administrator of NASA, and recipient of the NASA Distinguished Service Medal	B.S. (1974)
Arun Sharma	Computer scientist, distinguished emeritus professor at the Queensland University of Technology	
Alfred P. Southwick	Steamboat engineer, dentist, professor, credited with inventing the electric chair as a method of legal execution	
Nancy Temkin	Statistician, fellow of the American Statistical Association	Ph.D. (1976)
Jeffrey Umland	Chief mechanical engineer of NASA's InSight mission, chief mechanical engineer for the Curiosity rover	B.S. (1985) and Ph.D. (1991) in Mechanical Engineering
Alexander Vilenkin	Theoretical physicist and developer of the Borde–Guth–Vilenkin theorem	Ph.D. (1977)
Jeffrey Wigand	First tobacco industry executive to become a major whistleblower against the industry; subject of the feature film The Insider	B.A. Chemistry, M.A. Biochemistry, Ph.D. Biochemistry
John Wrench	Mathematician known for his work on calculating the mathematical constant pi to 100,000 decimal places	B.A. (1933), M.A. (1935)

=== Medicine ===
Name	Known for	Relationship to University at Buffalo
Frederick J. Bancroft	Surgeon and first president of Colorado's State Board of Health	M.D. (1861)
Edward Nathaniel Brush	Psychiatrist and hospital administrator of Sheppard and Enoch Pratt Hospital	1874
Michael A. Caligiuri	President of City of Hope National Medical Center	
John W. Cudmore	Surgeon and US Army major general	M.D. (1962)
Sidney Farber	Pathologist regarded as the "father of modern chemotherapy"	
George Edward Fell	Early developer of artificial ventilation, also investigated the physiology of electrocution, created the final design for the first electric chair in New York State	
Wilson Greatbatch	Inventor of improved versions of the cardiac pacemaker	
Orvan Hess	Medical doctor noted for early use of penicillin and developing the cardiotocograph	
Peter Huttenlocher	Pediatric neurologist and considered to be one of the fathers of developmental cognitive neuroscience	
Mukesh Jain	Dean of Medicine and Biological Sciences at Brown University (2022–)	B.S. (1987), M.D. (1991)
Jerome P. Kassirer	Nephrologist and editor-in-chief of the New England Journal of Medicine	M.D. (1957)
Elad Levy	Neurosurgeon who progressed the field of endovascular neurosurgery for the treatment of stroke	Professor and chairman of the Department of Neurosurgery
Demetrius Klee Lopes	Cerebrovascular neurosurgeon	M.D. (1995)
Germaine M. Buck Louis	Epidemiologist, and dean of the George Mason University College of Health and Human Services	B.A. (1978), M.S. (1980), Ph.D. (1987)
Mary Blair Moody	Physician and anatomist, first woman to earn a degree from the medical school	M.D. (1876)
Donnica Moore	Physician and women's health advocate; author and media commentator on women's health issues	M.D. (1986)
Hobart Reimann	Virologist known for research on pneumonia, periodic disease and the common cold	M.D.
Bruce Saran	Ophthalmologist and retina surgeon	M.D. (1988)
Joshua A. Siegel	Orthopaedic surgeon and fellow of the American Academy of Orthopaedic Surgeons	M.D.
George W. Thorn	Physician, pioneered use of cortisone to treat Addison's disease	M.D. (1929)

=== Business ===
Name	Known for	Relationship to University at Buffalo
John Alm	CEO of Coca-Cola Enterprises	
Pete Augustine	President and CEO of New Era Cap Company	B.S. in Accounting and Finance (1987)
Lucius L. Ball	Early partner, Ball Corporation	M.D. (1889)
Alan Brownstein	CEO of the American Cancer Society	
Millard S. Drexler	Chairman of J. Crew and CEO of Gap Inc.	
Ian Bruce Eichner	Founder of the Continuum Company, LLC; real estate developer	
Gregg S. Fisher	Founder of Gerstein Fisher	B.S. in Finance
Katherine Freund	Founder and president of ITNAmerica	B.A. (1972)
John Hewitt	Founder and CEO of Liberty Tax Service; co-founder of Jackson Hewitt	
Lap Shun Hui	Co-founder of Everex and eMachines	
Jeremy Jacobs	Billionaire and CEO of Delaware North Companies, owner of the Boston Bruins	B.A. in Business Administration
Jeff Jacobson	CEO of Xerox	B.S. in Business Administration
John Kapoor	Billionaire and founder of Akorn	Ph.D.
David Klein	CEO of Canopy Growth	M.B.A.
Laurent Levy	CEO of Nanobiotix	
Robin Yanhong Li	Billionaire and founder, chairman and CEO of Baidu.com, the most popular search engine in China	M.S. Computer Science
Mindy Lubber	President of Ceres	M.B.A.
Kevin P. Maloney	Founding partner of Property Markets Group	
Robert E. Rich Sr.	Founder of Rich Products Corporation	
Chris Sacca	Venture capitalist	Coursework in mathematics
Paul Snyder	Founder of Freezer Queen and owner of the Buffalo Braves	
Bob Swan	CEO of Intel	B.S. in Business Administration
Christopher Thornberg	Founding partner and CEO of Beacon Economics, LLC	B.S. in Business Administration (1989)
Donato Tramuto	CEO of Tivity Health	
Linda J. Wachner	CEO of Warnaco Group	B.A. (1966)

=== News ===
Name	Known for	Relationship to University at Buffalo
Howard Arenstein	Edward R. Murrow Award-winning journalist for CBS	
Wolf Blitzer	Emmy Award-winning journalist for CNN	B.A. in history (1970)
Greg D'Alba	President of CNN News Networks	B.A. (1981)
Hena Doba	TV anchor for Cheddar and formerly CBS, known for The National Desk with Hena Doba	B.A. in Psychology and English (2002)
Liz Dribben	Buffalo's first woman TV anchor at WKBW-TV, CBS News producer	B.A. (1958)
Ira Flatow	Emmy Award-winning science journalist; host of Newton's Apple; current host of NPR's Science Friday	
Nick Gillespie	Editor of Reason.com and Reason.tv; editor-in-chief of Reason magazine	Ph.D. in English Literature
Terry Gross	Peabody Award-winning host of the radio interview program Fresh Air	
Sharon A. Hill	Founder of Doubtful News and contributor to The Huffington Post	M.A. (2010)
Howard Kurtz	Media reporter and columnist at the Washington Post	B.A. in Psychology and English (1974)
Steve Liesman	Emmy Award-winning journalist and Pulitzer Prize winner; CNBC Senior Economics Reporter	
Tom Toles	Pulitzer Prize-winning editorial cartoonist for the Washington Post	

=== Art, film, theatre, and television ===
Name	Known for	Relationship to University at Buffalo
Melvin Bernhardt	Tony Award-winning director	
Ellen Carey	Artist known for conceptual photography	M.F.A. (1978)
Maury Chaykin	Actor	B.F.A. in Theatre (1972)
Jesse Cox	YouTuber	B.A.
Thomas Curley	2015 Academy Award winner for Best Achievement in Sound Mixing	B.A. in Film Studies (2001)
Allan D'Arcangelo	Artist	B.A. in history (1953)
Winston Duke	Actor	B.A. (2008)
James Foley	Director of House of Cards	B.A. in psychology (1974)
Shep Gordon	Hollywood film agent and producer; featured in the 2014 documentary Supermensch: The Legend of Shep Gordon	B.A. in sociology (1968)
Brad Grey	Golden Globe winner; television and film producer; CEO of Paramount Pictures	B.A. in Communication and Business (1979)
Max Grodénchik	Television and film actor	
Fred Hembeck	Cartoonist	B.A. (1975)
Evan King	Bagpipe champion	Doctor of Physical Therapy
Sylvia Lark	Seneca painter, printmaker	B.A. (1969)
Robert Lieberman	Director of Fire in the Sky and Table for Five	
Abbe Raven	Chairwoman and CEO and president of A&E Television Networks, founder of The History Channel	B.A. in theatre (1974)
Alberto Rey	Artist	M.F.A. (1987)
Peter Riegert	Academy and Emmy award-nominated actor, screenwriter and film director	
Parry Shen	Chinese American actor	
Cindy Sherman	Artist known for Untitled Film Stills	B.A. (1976)
Victoria Siemer	Graphic artist, designer	B.F.A in Communication Design
Ron Silver	Tony Award-winning actor and political activist	
Ellen Spiro	Documentary filmmaker; Guggenheim and Rockefeller fellow	
Anne Turyn	Photographer	M.F.A.
Roy Vongtama	Actor; board-certified radiation oncologist	M.D. (2000)
John Walsh	Host of America's Most Wanted	1965
Harvey Weinstein	Film producer; Harvey Weinstein sexual abuse cases; Weinstein effect	Attended 1969–1973 but did not graduate. Received honorary degree in 2000 which was revoked in 2017.
Bil Zelman	Photographer and director	B.F.A. (1996)
Alan Zweibel	Comedy writer, multiple Emmy Award winner and one of the original writers for Saturday Night Live	

=== Academia ===
Name	Known for	Relationship to University at Buffalo
Paula Allen-Meares	Chancellor of the University of Illinois at Chicago	
Mary Anne Bobinski	Dean of the Emory University School of Law	B.A., J.D.
Zhijian James Chen	Member of the National Academy of Sciences	Ph.D. in biochemistry (1991)
Soonja Choi	Linguist and member of the Academia Europaea	Ph.D. in linguistics (1986)
Steven A. Cohen	Executive director of The Earth Institute at Columbia University	Ph.D. and M.A.
U. B. Desai	Founding director of the Indian Institute of Technology Hyderabad	M.S. (1976)
Marc Edwards	Expert on water treatment and corrosion, professor at Virginia Tech, and MacArthur Fellow	B.A.
Karen Halbersleben	President of Northland College	Ph.D. in history (1987)
Mark Huddleston	President of the University of New Hampshire	B.A. in Political Science (1972)
Kay Johnson-Gentile	Professor at Buffalo State University	Ph.D. in Elementary Education
Sung-Mo Kang	President of the Korean Advanced Institute of Science and Technology	M.S. in Electrical Engineering (1972)
Ann Kirschner	Academic; entrepreneur; author of Sala's Gift; launched NFL.COM for the National Football League; co-founder of Columbia University's interactive knowledge network Fathom.com; university dean of William E. Macaulay Honors College of The City University of New York	B.A. in English (1972)
Brian Levin-Stankevich	President of Westminster College; chancellor of University of Wisconsin-Eau Claire	
William M. London	Professor of public health and consumer advocate	Ed.M., Ed.D.
Elmira Mangum	President of Florida A&M University	Ph.D.
C. L. Max Nikias	President of the University of Southern California	M.S. and Ph.D. in Electrical Engineering
A. Kenneth Pye	President of Southern Methodist University	B.A.
William J. Rapaport	Researcher on intentionality and artificial intelligence, professor at UB	M.S. in Computer Science (1984)
Blair A. Rudes	Linguist known for his work on Native American languages	B.A. (1973), M.A. (1974), Ph.D. in linguistics (1976)
Richard D. Schafer	Mathematician and fellow of the American Mathematical Society	
Wilfrid Sellars	Philosopher	M.A. (1934)
Murat Soygeniş	Architect and professor, founding principal, S+ ARCHITECTURE	M. Arch. (1985)
Robert E. Wright	Nef Family Chair of Political Economy at Augustana University	M.A. and Ph.D. in History
Ewa Ziarek	Julian Park Professor of Comparative Literature at UB	Ph.D. and M.A.

=== Literature ===
Name	Known for	Relationship to University at Buffalo
Charles Baxter	Author of fiction, nonfiction, and poetry; Guggenheim Fellow	
Bob Budiansky	Comic book writer, The Transformers	
Taylor Caldwell	Anglo-American novelist	B.A. in English (1931)
Mary Cappello	Guggenheim Fellow and professor of English and Creative Writing at the University of Rhode Island	M.A., Ph.D.
Doris Davenport	Writer, educator, and literary and performance poet	M.A.
Elizabeth Evitts Dickinson	Writer on subjects related to architecture, design, culture, and the built environment	B.A.
Graham Foust	Poet and associate professor at Saint Mary's College of California	Ph.D. (2002)
Richard Hofstadter	Pulitzer Prize-winning historian; author of Anti-intellectualism in American Life and The Age of Reform	B.A.
Anthony Petrosky	Poet and 1982 Walt Whitman Award winner	
Donald Revell	Poet, essayist, translator, Guggenheim fellow, and 2004 Lenore Marshall Award winner	
Merlin Stone	Author of When God Was a Woman	B.S. (1958)
Elizabeth Willis	Poet, literary critic, and Guggenheim Fellow	

=== Music ===
Name	Known for	Relationship to University at Buffalo
Laura Aikin	Operatic coloratura soprano	
Jay Beckenstein	Saxophone player and co-founder of Spyro Gyra	B.A. in music (1973)
Keith Buckley	Vocalist, lyricist and founding member of Buffalo-based hardcore band Every Time I Die and metal supergroup The Damned Things	B.A. in English (2003)
Peter Christopherson	Designer with Hipgnosis, video director, co-founder of musical groups Throbbing Gristle, Psychic TV, and Coil.	
Rob Derhak	Bassist, lyricist and founding member of Buffalo-based jam-band moe.	
Ronnie James Dio	Heavy metal vocalist and songwriter; lead singer of Rainbow 1975–1979; lead singer and creator of Dio; lead singer of Black Sabbath 1979–1982	
Jonathan Donahue	Lead singer and co-founder of Mercury Rev	B.A. in English (1988)
Morton Feldman	Composer and Edgard Varèse Professor of Music	
Chuck Garvey	Guitarist, lyricist and founding member of the Buffalo-based jam-band moe.	
Grasshopper	Co-founder of Mercury Rev	B.A. in Media Studies (1988)
Willie Nile, aka Robert Noonan	Singer, songwriter	B.A. in philosophy (1971)
Valerian Ruminski	Award-winning bass singer	Bachelor of Music (1995)
Elliott Sharp	Multi-instrumentalist, composer, and performer	M.A. in Music Theory and Composition (1977)

=== Sports and athletics ===
Name	Known for	Relationship to University at Buffalo
Jonathan Akpoborie	Nigerian soccer player	Member of the Buffalo Bulls men's soccer team
Craig Austin	Member of the Columbia Lions basketball team; Ivy League Basketball Player of the Year	J.D. (2008)
Eddie Basinski	Major League Baseball (MLB) pitcher (1944–1945, 1947)	Played tennis and ran cross country for the Buffalo Bulls
Turner Battle	Basketball player and coach	B.A. (2006); member of the Buffalo Bulls men's basketball team
Nick Bremigan	MLB umpire	Member of the Buffalo Bulls baseball team
George Whitney Calhoun	Football and hockey player, co-founder of the Green Bay Packers	
Louis Campbell	Basketball player, French Basketball Cup MVP	Member of the Buffalo Bulls men's basketball team
Meili Carpenter	High diver	B.S. (2010); member of the Buffalo Bulls diving team
Russell Cicerone	Professional soccer player	B.S. (2017); member of the Buffalo Bulls men's soccer team
Patrick Clarke	Arena football kicker for several teams	Member of the Buffalo Bulls football team
Marc Julian Copani	Professional wrestler, World Wrestling Entertainment	
Modie Cox	Professional basketball player	B.A. in sociology (1996); member of the Buffalo Bulls men's basketball team
Sam Craven	English soccer player	Member of the Buffalo Bulls men's soccer team
Richard Deitsch	Sportswriter and radio host	
Cierra Dillard	Basketball player drafted by the Minnesota Lynx	Member of the Buffalo Bulls women's basketball team
Shaun Dolac	National Football League (NFL) linebacker	B.A. in communication (2024); member of the Buffalo Bulls football team
Jim Drucker	Commissioner of the Continental Basketball Association, commissioner of the Arena Football League (AFL), founder of NewKadia.com	B.A. (1973), business manager of The Spectrum, play-by-play announcer for Buffalo Bulls hockey on WBFO radio
Shawn Dubin	MLB pitcher	Member of the Buffalo Bulls baseball team
Steve Geltz	MLB pitcher	B.A. (2008); member of the Buffalo Bulls baseball team
James Gordon	AFL tight end	Member of the Buffalo Bulls football team
Desmond Green	MAC champion wrestler; professional mixed martial artist	Member of the Buffalo Bulls wrestling team
Dillon Guy	Canadian Football League (CFL) offensive lineman	B.A. in sociology (2016); member of the Buffalo Bulls football team
Drew Haddad	NFL wide receiver	B.A. (2000); member of the Buffalo Bulls football team
Dave Hahn	Professional mountain guide, ski patroller, journalist and lecturer	B.A. (1984)
Blake Hamilton	Professional basketball player	B.A. in sociology (2017); member of the Buffalo Bulls men's basketball team
Demone Harris	NFL linebacker	Member of the Buffalo Bulls football team
Jeremy Harris	Professional basketball player	B.A. in social sciences interdisciplinary program (2019); member of the Buffalo Bulls men's basketball team
Joe Hesketh	MLB pitcher (1984–1994)	B.A. (1980); member of the Buffalo Bulls baseball team
Adrian Hill	NFL official and aerospace engineer	B.S. in electrical engineering (1986)
Ezekiel Jackson	Professional wrestler, World Wrestling Entertainment	
Tyree Jackson	Professional football quarterback and tight end	B.A. in social sciences interdisciplinary program (2018); member of the Buffalo Bulls football team
Anthony Johnson	Football player	B.A. in sociology (2018); member of the Buffalo Bulls football team
Chris Kanyon	Professional wrestler in World Championship Wrestling and World Wrestling Entertainment	B.S. in Physical Therapy
Tim Kenney	Director of Athletics, St. Bonaventure University	Member of the Buffalo Bulls swimming team
Malcolm Koonce	NFL defensive end	Member of the Buffalo Bulls football team
Cam Lewis	NFL cornerback	Member of the Buffalo Bulls football team
Joe Licata	Football player and coach	B.A. in history (2016); member of the Buffalo Bulls football team
Khalil Mack	NFL linebacker and defensive end, 2016 NFL Defensive Player of the Year	B.A. (2014); member of the Buffalo Bulls football team
C. J. Massinburg	Professional basketball player	Member of the Buffalo Bulls men's basketball team
Javon McCrea	Professional basketball player	Member of the Buffalo Bulls men's basketball team
Liam McHugh	Studio host for the NBC Sports Network	B.A. in communication (1997)
Kate McMeeken-Ruscoe	Olympic basketball player for New Zealand	Member of the Buffalo Bulls women's basketball team
Jim McNally	College football and NFL coach	Player and coach for the Buffalo Bulls football team
Steven Means	NFL defensive end	Member of the Buffalo Bulls football team
Red Murdock	College football player; NCAA record-holder for forced fumbles	B.A. in psychology (2024); member of the Buffalo Bulls football team
Tom Murphy	MLB catcher	B.A. (2012); member of the Buffalo Bulls baseball team
Matvey Natanzon	Backgammon player	B.A. in accounting (1991)
Branden Oliver	NFL running back for the San Diego Chargers	B.A. in sociology (2015); member of the Buffalo Bulls football team
Dominic Oppong	Canadian soccer player	Member of the Buffalo Bulls men's soccer team
K. J. Osborn	NFL wide receiver	B.A. in sociology (2018); member of the Buffalo Bulls football team
Jaret Patterson	NFL running back	Member of the Buffalo Bulls football team
Sam Pellom	National Basketball Association (NBA) forward	Member of the Buffalo Bulls men's basketball team
Nick Perkins	Professional basketball player	B.A. in sociology (2019); member of the Buffalo Bulls men's basketball team
Gerry Philbin	Professional football player in the NFL, American Football League and World Football League (WFL)	Member of the Buffalo Bulls football team
E. Greenard Poles	CFL linebacker	Member of the Buffalo Bulls football team
Brent Pry	Virginia Tech head football coach	Member of the Buffalo Bulls football team
Frank Reid	CFL defensive tackle	Member of the Buffalo Bulls football team
Stephanie Reid	Women's National Basketball League player	Member of the Buffalo Bulls women's basketball team
Matt Rhule	Head coach of the Carolina Panthers	M.Ed. (2003); Defensive line coach of the Buffalo Bulls football team
Jamey Richard	NFL center	Member of the Buffalo Bulls football team
Naaman Roosevelt	NFL and CFL wide receiver	B.A. in sociology (2022); member of the Buffalo Bulls football team
Mason Schreck	NFL tight end	Member of the Buffalo Bulls football team
Jake Schum	Professional football punter	Member of the Buffalo Bulls football team
Trevor Scott	Professional football defensive end	Member of the Buffalo Bulls football team
Jarryn Skeete	Professional basketball player	B.A. in communication (2016); member of the Buffalo Bulls men's basketball team
Kristjan Sokoli	NFL defensive end, first Albanian-born player in NFL history	Member of the Buffalo Bulls football team
James Starks	Running back for the Green Bay Packers	Member of the Buffalo Bulls football team
John Stofa	Professional football quarterback in the NFL and WFL	Member of the Buffalo Bulls football team
Josh Thomas	NFL cornerback	Member of the Buffalo Bulls football team
Mitchell Watt	Professional basketball player	B.A. (2012); member of the Buffalo Bulls men's basketball team
Drew Willy	NFL and CFL quarterback	B.A. in communications (2009); member of the Buffalo Bulls football team

== Chancellors and presidents ==
From its inception until 1962, the private school was known as the University of Buffalo, and it was headed by a chancellor. Since it became the public State University of New York at Buffalo, it has been called the university at Buffalo, and the CEO is its president.

No.	Image	President	Term start	Term end	Refs.
Chancellors of the University of Buffalo (1846–1962)
1		Millard Fillmore (Note: Also served as comptroller of New York State (1848–1849), 12th vice president (1849–1850), and 13th president (1850–1853) of the United States during his tenure)	1846	March 8, 1874 (Note: Died in office)	
Chair		Orsamus H. Marshall	1874	1882	
2		Orsamus H. Marshall	1882	July 9, 1884	
3		E. Carleton Sprague	1885	February 14, 1895	
4		James O. Putnam (Note: New York State Senator and Postmaster General of Buffalo)	1895	1902	
5		Wilson S. Bissell (Note: 36th United States Postmaster General)	1902	1903	
acting		George Gorham (1837–1906)	1903	1905	
6		Charles Phelps Norton	1905	1920	
acting		Walter P. Cooke (Note: Chairman of the University Council)	1920	1922	
7		Samuel P. Capen (Note: Former director of the American Council on Education)	1922	1950	
8		T. R. McConnell	1950	June 30, 1954	
acting		Seymour H. Knox II (Note: Chairman of the council)	July 1, 1954	August 31, 1954	
9		Clifford C. Furnas (Note: Last chancellor of University of Buffalo and first president of SUNY Buffalo. Took a leave of absence from 1955 to 1957 to serve as the Assistant Secretary of Defense for the United States.)	September 1, 1954	1966	
acting		Claude E. Puffer (Note: Served as acting chancellor from December 5, 1955 to February 1, 1957 while Chancellor Furnas served as Assistant Secretary of Defense for the United States)	December 5, 1955	February 1, 1957	
Presidents of the State University of New York at Buffalo (1962–present)
10		Martin Meyerson (Note: Resigned to head the University of Pennsylvania)	1966	August 10, 1969	
acting		Peter F. Regan	August 11, 1969	June 30, 1970	
11		Robert L. Ketter	July 1, 1970	February 28, 1982	
12		Steven Sample	March 1, 1982	March 31, 1991 (Note: Resigned to head the University of Southern California)	
acting		Bill Greiner	April 1, 1991	September 4, 1991	
13		Bill Greiner	September 4, 1991	December 31, 2003	
14		John B. Simpson	January 1, 2004	April 18, 2011	
15		Satish K. Tripathi	April 18, 2011	present	

Table notes:

== See also ==
- List of people from Buffalo, New York
