= Ranzow–Sander House =

Historic house in Iowa, United States

- U.S. National Register of Historic Places
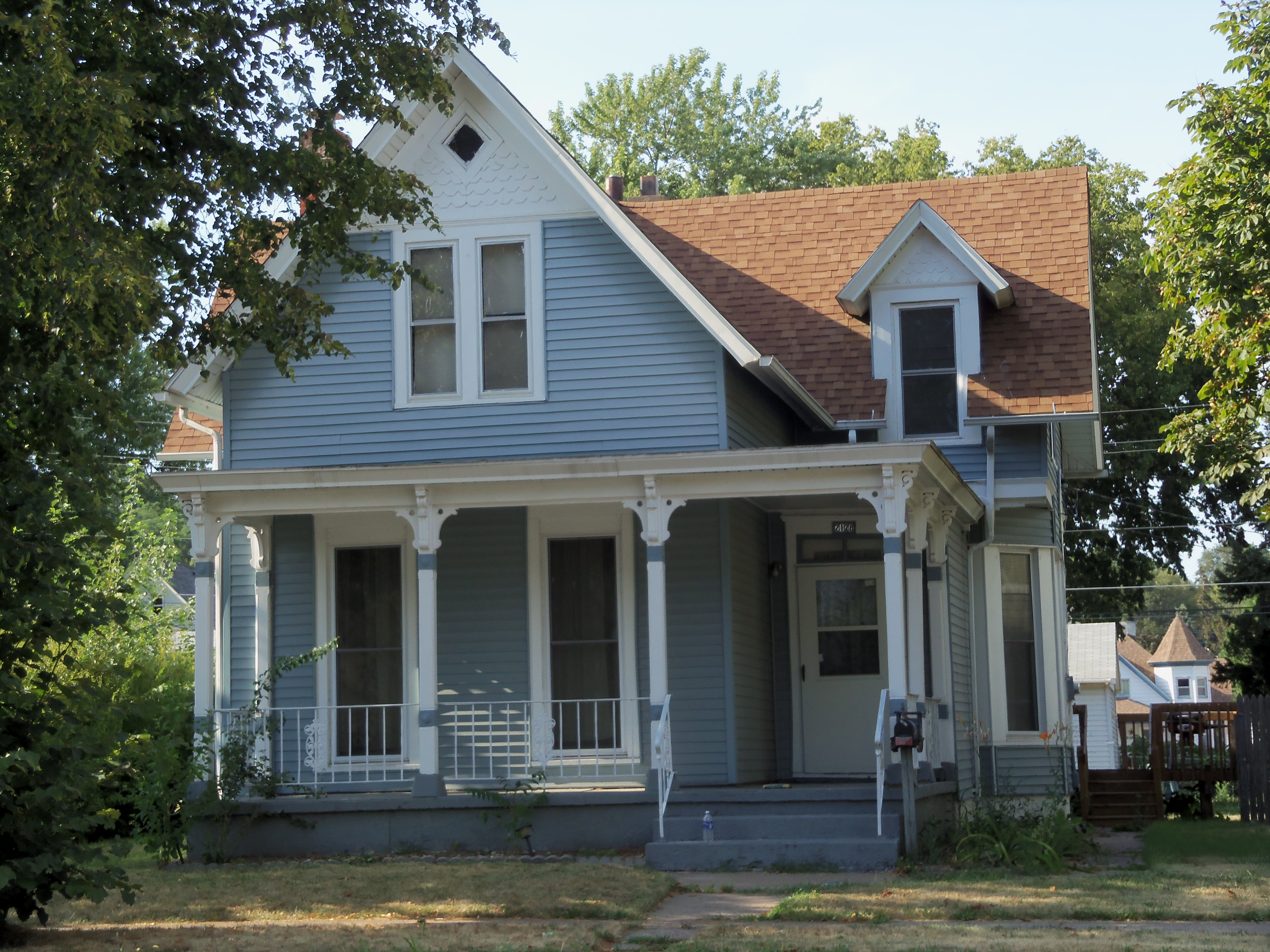

- Location within Iowa Location within the United States
- Location: 2128 W. 3rd St. Davenport, Iowa
- Coordinates: 41°31′21″N 90°36′37″W
- Area: less than one acre
- Built: 1881
- Architectural style: Eastlake
- MPS: Davenport MRA
- NRHP reference No.: 83002489
- Added to NRHP: July 7, 1983

The Ranzow–Sander House is a historic building located in the West End of Davenport, Iowa, United States. It has been listed on the National Register of Historic Places since 1983.

== History ==
Charles F. Ranzow built this house in 1881. He established his paint store downtown, Charles F. Ranzow and Sons. The building is a contributing property in the West Third Street Historic District. The store sold oils, glass, doors and the like. In 1884 the house was sold to Julius Sander. He was employed in the hardware trade and opened his own store in 1890.

== Architecture ==
This Vernacular Eastlake cottage shows elements of the Queen Anne and Gothic Revival styles. It is a 1½-story house features an irregular plan, a steeply pitched roof, and bits of gable-end decorations. There are also decorative details across the top of the porch. Also noteworthy are the textured wall surfaces and the paneled vergeboards.
