= Siemer =

Siemer is a German surname. Notable people with the surname include:

- Laurentius Siemer (1888–1956), priest
- Oscar Siemer (1901–1959), American baseball player
- Victoria Siemer, American graphic artist

== See also ==
- Siemer House
- Siemers
