= Greg Fisher =

Greg Fisher, or variants in that name, could refer to:

- Greg Fischer (born 1958), American businessman and entrepreneur, mayor of Louisville, Kentucky
- Gregg S. Fisher, American investment manager
- Greg Fisher (sailor)
- Greg Fisher (historian), British author and editor of works on the ancient world

== See also ==
- Murder of Constable Thomas King, a 1978 crime in Canada committed by high school students Darrell Crook and Gregory Fischer
