= Demetrius Klee Lopes =

American neurosurgeon (born 1970)

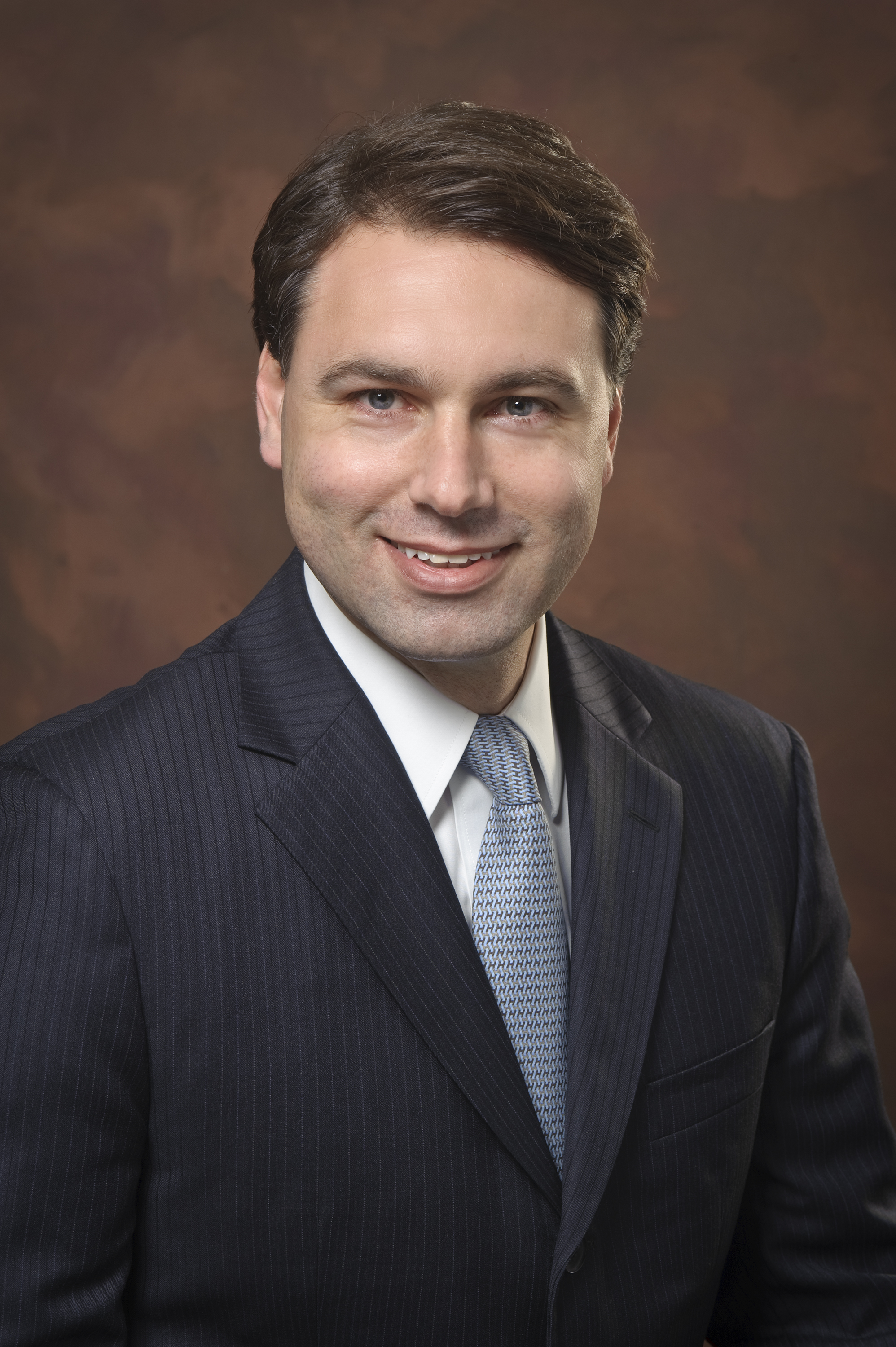
- Born: March 19, 1970 (age 56); Chicago
- Education: Federal University of Rio Grande do Sul (1993), State University of New York at Buffalo (1995)
- Occupation: Neurosurgeon
- Years active: 1994 – present
- Known for: Neuroendovascular surgery
- Children: 2
- Website: www.demetriuslopesmd.com

Demetrius Klee Lopes (born March 19, 1970) is a cerebrovascular neurosurgeon specializing in neuroendovascular therapy. At Advocate Health, he serves as medical director of the cerebrovascular and neuroendovascular program and is co-director of their stroke program.

Lopes is a guest faculty member of Brigham and Women's Hospital Cerebrovascular and Skull Base Symposium at Harvard Medical School. Lopes is the founder of nonprofit Cure4Stroke Foundation, editor in chief of "Neurovascular Exchange" educational website and serves on the organizing committee of the annual World Live Neurovascular Conference.

Lopes' contributions to neurovascular surgery have improved safety and decreased the disabilities caused by stroke, brain aneurysms and arterial malformations. He collaborated on major studies that defined the current indications for mechanical thrombectomy for the treatment of acute stroke. In addition, Lopes had contributed significantly to the development of flow diversion treatment for cerebral aneurysms.

== Early life and education ==
Born on March 19, 1970, Lopes lived in Brazil until 1993. He began his medical education in 1987 at Federal University of Rio Grande do Sul. After completing his doctorate in medicine in 1993, he completed his residency and fellowship at State University of New York at Buffalo.

== Career ==
In 2001, Lopes joined Rush University Medical Center. In May 2006, he was voted Chicago's "Dr. McDreamy" by the readers of the Chicago Tribune.

In 2013, Lopes founded the nonprofit Cure4Stroke Foundation, which aims to raise stroke awareness and celebrate stroke survivors.

In 2015, Lopes published articles confirming that the use of endovascular therapy for ischemic stroke improves patient outcomes.

In 2015, along with Elad Levy, Lopes performed research resulting in paradigm shifts in the treatment of cerebrovascular diseases, including being the US Interventional Principal Investigator for the SWIFT PRIME trials. Lopes also conducted research on the efficacy and safety of endovascular thrombectomy in 2018.

In July 2018, Lopes joined Advocate Health Care as co-director of the stroke program.

In 2019, Lopes published a preliminary study on usage of the pipeline embolization device to treat small to medium-sized intracranial aneurysms, and has also demonstrated its safety and efficacy for patients under 22 years old. Later that year, Lopes also published research results demonstrating the safety and efficacy of transvenous embolization for treating arteriovenous malformations. Lopes published another similar study in July 2020.

== Selected publications ==
- Saver, JL; Goyal, M; Bonafe, A; Diener, HC; Levy, EI; Pereira, VM; Albers, GW; Cognard, C; Cohen, DJ; Hacke, W; Jansen, O; Jovin, TG; Mattle, HP; Nogueira, RG; Siddiqui, AH; Yavagal, DR; Baxter, BW; Devlin, TG; Lopes, DK; Reddy, VK; de Rochemont, R; Singer, OC; Jahan, R (2015). "Stent-retriever thrombectomy after intravenous t-PA vs. t-PA alone in stroke" (PDF). N Engl J Med. 372 (24): 2285–95. doi:10.1056/NEJMoa1415061. PMID 25882376. S2CID 6570411.
- Kerolus, MG; Tan, LA; Lopes, DK (2017). "Giant vein of Galen malformation in an adult". Radiol Case Rep. 12 (3): 585–589. doi:10.1016/j.radcr.2017.03.012. PMC 5551915. PMID 28828131.
- Spiotta, AM; Derdeyn, CP; Tateshima, S; Mocco, J; Crowley, RW; Liu, KC; Jensen, L; Ebersole, K; Reeves, A; Lopes, DK; Hanel, RA; Sauvageau, E; Duckwiler, G; Siddiqui, A; Levy, E; Puri, A; Pride, L; Novakovic, R; Chaudry, MI; Turner, RD; Turk, AS (2017). "Results of the ANSWER Trial Using the PulseRider for the Treatment of Broad-Necked, Bifurcation Aneurysms". Neurosurgery. 81: 56–65. doi:10.1093/neuros/nyx085. PMID 28449126. S2CID 3806248.
- Yoo, AJ; Khatri, P; Mocco, J; Zaidat, OO; Gupta, R; Frei, D; Lopes, D; Shownkeen, H; Berkhemer, OA; Meyer, D; Hak, SS; Kuo, SS; Buell, H; Bose, A; Sit, SP; von Kummer, R (2017). "Impact of Thrombus Length on Outcomes After Intra-Arterial Aspiration Thrombectomy in the THERAPY Trial". Stroke. 48 (7): 1895–1900. doi:10.1161/STROKEAHA.116.016253. PMID 28596447. S2CID 279737.
- Nogueira, RG; Jadhav, AP; Haussen, DC; Bonafe, A; Budzik, RF; Bhuva, P; Yavagal, DR; Ribo, M; Cognard, C; Hanel, RA; Sila, CA; Hassan, AE; Millan, M; Levy, EI; Mitchell, P; Chen, M; English, JD; Shah, QA; Silver, FL; Pereira, VM; Mehta, BP; Baxter, BW; Abraham, MG; Cardona, P; Veznedaroglu, E; Hellinger, FR; Feng, L; Kirmani, JF; Lopes, DK; Jankowitz, BT; Frankel, MR; Costalat, V; Vora, NA; Yoo, AJ; Malik, AM; Furlan, AJ; Rubiera, M; Aghaebrahim, A; Olivot, JM; Tekle, WG; Shields, R; Graves, T; Lewis, RJ; Smith, WS; Liebeskind, DS; Saver, JL; Jovin, TG (2018). "Thrombectomy 6 to 24 Hours after Stroke with a Mismatch between Deficit and Infarct". N Engl J Med. 378 (1): 11–21. doi:10.1056/NEJMoa1706442. PMID 29129157.
