= Hiller Building =

- U.S. National Register of Historic Places
- U.S. Historic district – Contributing property
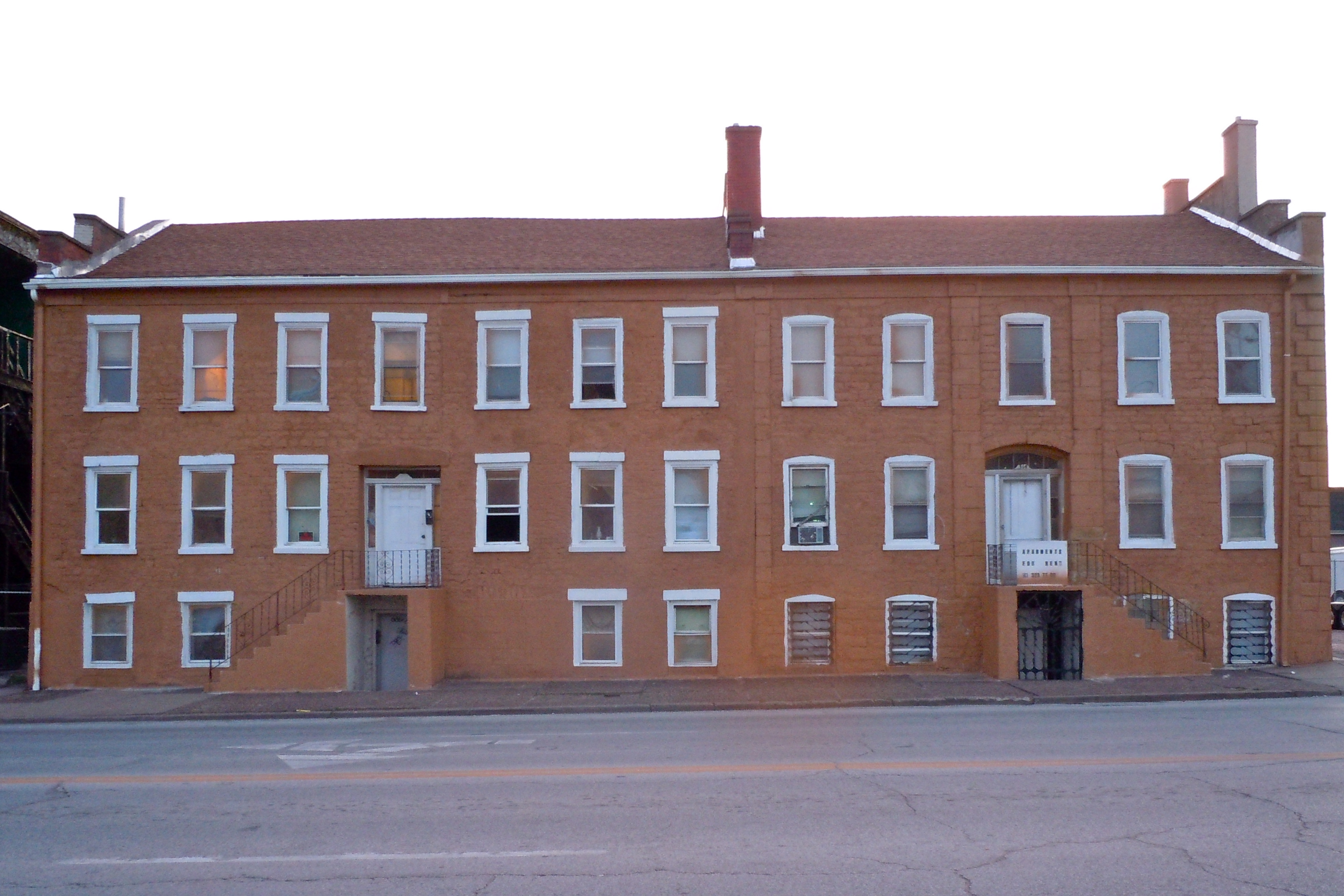
- The Hiller Building in 2011

- Location within Iowa Location within the United States
- Location: 310-314 Gaines St. Davenport, Iowa
- Coordinates: 41°31′22″N 90°34′59″W
- Area: less than one acre
- Built: 1852, 1856, 1859
- Architectural style: Federal
- Part of: West Third Street Historic District (Davenport, Iowa) (ID83003741)
- MPS: Davenport MRA
- NRHP reference No.: 74000810
- Added to NRHP: July 24, 1974

The Hiller Building, also known as the Schick Apartments, is located on the edge of downtown Davenport, Iowa, United States. The Federal style building is a row house. In 1974, it was individually listed on the National Register of Historic Places. In 1983, it was included as a contributing property in the West Third Street Historic District. The building was determined structurally unsafe by the City of Davenport and demolished in 2025

== History ==
The property on which the building stands is in the oldest section of the city. It was purchased in 1847 by John Hiller from Davenport and founder and developer Antoine LeClaire. Hiller himself was a builder who is responsible for the construction of the Clock Tower building on the Rock Island Arsenal.

This row house was built in three sections in 1852, 1856, and 1859. The expansion reflected the city's population explosion in the 1850s. Because there was a need for rental properties, Hiller expanded his own home and rented out the extra rooms. It is not certain which of the three sections is the original.

In 1902, the Schick family bought the building from the Hillers. It is believed that this is one of the oldest extant buildings in Davenport.

The building has sat empty since 2015 and it has been on Davenport's "repair or demolish" list since 2016. Its south wall is bowing, crackling and losing some of its stones.

== Architecture ==
The two-storey rectangular structure houses apartments that are symmetrically arranged along interior corridors. The north wall is composed of stone laid in ashlar fashion and covered in stucco. There are rough irregular shaped stones on the basement level and on the upper two floors of the main façade. The north side of the façade features stone pilasters with mock capital wood crowns that flank the entranceway. The northeast corner has stone quoins. The sidewalls and one in the middle are stepped at the top and the structure is topped with a gabled roof. For the most part, the interior retains its original layout and woodwork, including staircases.
