= Siemers =

Siemers is a German surname. Notable people with this surname include:

- Jimmy Siemers (born 1982), American water skier
- Paige Siemers (born 1982), American long-distance track runner

== See also ==
- Siemer
