= Linden Flats =

- U.S. National Register of Historic Places
- U.S. Historic district – Contributing property

- Location within Iowa Location within the United States
- Location: 219 Scott St. Davenport, Iowa
- Coordinates: 41°31′19.3″N 90°34′47.1″W
- Area: 1 acre (0.40 ha)
- Built: 1900
- Architect: Clausen & Burrows
- Architectural style: Federal; Colonial Revival
- Part of: West Third Street Historic District (Davenport, Iowa) (ID83003741)
- MPS: Davenport MRA
- NRHP reference No.: 83003661
- Added to NRHP: November 28, 1983

Linden Flats was located in downtown Davenport, Iowa, United States. It was individually listed on the National Register of Historic Places, and included as a contributing property in the West Third Street Historic District in 1983. The building was torn down after it was destroyed in a fire in 2005.

== History ==
The building was constructed in 1900 in the German section of Davenport just off the West Third Street. It was one of several large apartment blocks that were built around the turn of the 20th century in Davenport. There were a number of similar apartment buildings that were built in this part of the downtown area and many of them have been torn down. The building continued to serve as an apartment building until October 16, 2005 when its roof collapsed into the third floor during a fire.

== Architecture ==
The Linden Flats was a three-story, brick building that was built on a stone foundation. The façade combined elements of the Victorian and Federal styles. The Federal style was found in the simple box structure, the unadorned windows, the stone columns and lintels over the doorways, and the symmetry of the building's composition. The Victorian elements were found in the building's decorative embellishments, which included the two window bays that rose and became part of the cornice, the two-toned brick pattern work and the bracketing, and the garland swags on the cornice.
