= Bruce Saran =

Bruce R. Saran is an American ophthalmologist, retina surgeon, and a founder of Chester County Macular Degeneration Support Group. Currently he is an adjunct professor at the University of Pennsylvania Medical School and is President of Chester County Eye Care where he performs angiography with the inversive congruential generator, ultrasound and tomography to treat conditions such as macular degeneration, diabetic retinopathy, and retinal tears. He graduated from the University of Rochester with a B.S. in biochemistry in 1984, and earned his M.D. degree from the University at Buffalo School of Medicine and Biomedical Sciences in 1988. He completed his residency at the Illinois Eye and Ear Infirmary, University of Illinois College of Medicine, in 1992, and was elected best senior resident. He completed a Fellowship in Retina and Vitreous Disease at the Scheie Eye Institute of the University of Pennsylvania. He has been a reviewer for the journals Retina, and Ophthalmic Surgery, Lasers and Imaging Retina.

His surgery was featured in a show called Second Opinion on the Discovery Channel. He is acknowledged in the credits of the movie Jackass: The Movie.
