= Charles F. Ranzow and Sons Building =

- U.S. Historic district – Contributing property
- Davenport Register of Historic Properties
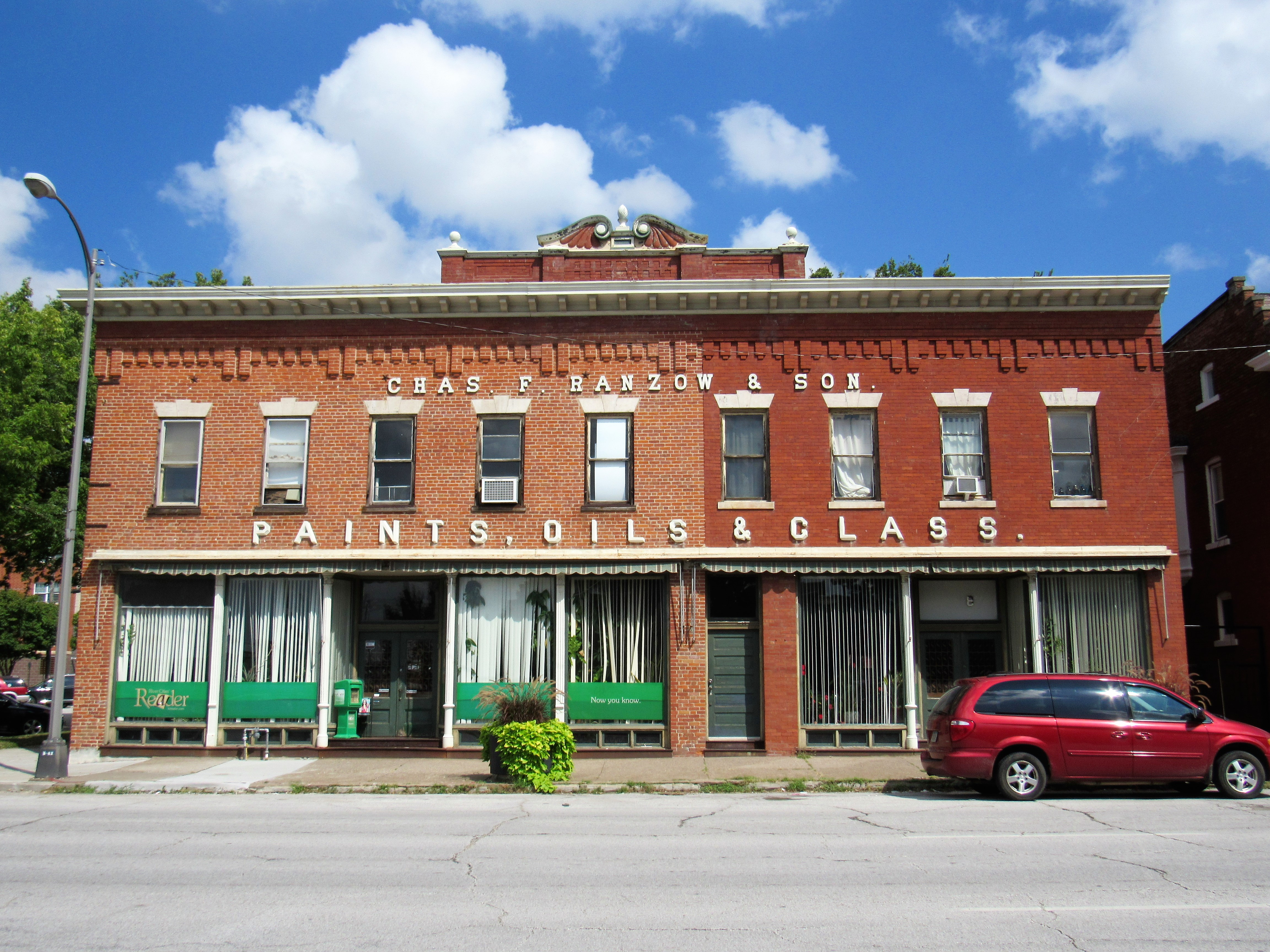

- Location within Iowa Location within the United States
- Location: 532 W. 3rd St. Davenport, Iowa
- Coordinates: 41°31′21″N 90°34′53″W
- Area: less than one acre
- Architectural style: Early Commercial
- Part of: West Third Street Historic District (ID83003741)
- MPS: Davenport MRA
- DRHP No.: 36

Significant dates
- Added to NRHP: November 18, 1983
- Designated DRHP: November 15, 2000

The Charles F. Ranzow and Sons Building is a historic building located on Lot 1, Block 18 of the original town of Davenport, Iowa, United States. It is contributing property in the West Third Street Historic District, which was added to the National Register of Historic Places in 1983. The building was individually listed on the Davenport Register of Historic Properties in 2000.

== History ==
Charles F. Ranzow owned the site by 1864 when he built a building on the site. The Sanborn Fire Insurance maps of 1886, 1892, and 1910 suggest the western two-thirds of the building was constructed by 1886 and the eastern third of the building was built between 1892 and 1910. The Ranzow Paint Company occupied the site for over 100 years. Wallpaper, paints, and oils were sold in the western section, and the eastern part functioned as a sash and door warehouse. The building currently houses the River Cities' Reader and AdMospheres, an advertising agency.

== Architecture ==
The building is a two-story free standing brick structure with a brick foundation. It features an overhanging bracketed metal cornice and a centralized broken pediment above. The windows on the second floor have stone lintels with keystones. The two original storefronts are indicated by iron columns. Access to the second floor is located between the two storefronts. The different coloration of the brick on the main façade of the building differentiates the two sections of the building.
