= Ophthalmic Surgery, Lasers and Imaging Retina =

- Discipline: Ophthalmology
- Language: English
- Edited by: Darius M. Moshfeghi

Publication details
- Former name(s): Ophthalmic Surgery, Lasers and Imaging
- History: 1976–present
- Publisher: SLACK Incorporated
- Frequency: Monthly
- Impact factor: 1.296 (2021)

Standard abbreviations
- ISO 4: Ophthalmic Surg. Lasers Imaging Retina

Indexing
- ISSN: 2325-8160 (print); 2325-8179 (web)
- OCLC no.: 820959361

Links
- Journal homepage; Online archive

Ophthalmic Surgery, Lasers and Imaging Retina is a monthly peer-reviewed medical journal of ophthalmology covering retinal diseases, surgery, and pharmacotherapy. It was established in 1970 and is published by SLACK Incorporated.

== History ==
The journal was established as a quarterly journal in 1970 with George W. Weinstein serving as founding editor-in-chief. The current editor-in-chief is Darius M. Moshfeghi (Stanford University School of Medicine).

Since 2016, the journal has published one issue per month.

== Abstracting and indexing ==
The journal is abstracted and indexed in:

- CINAHL
- Current Contents/Clinical Medicine
- Embase
- Index Medicus/MEDLINE/PubMed
- Science Citation Index Expanded
- Scopus

According to the Journal Citation Reports, the journal has a 2021 impact factor of 1.296.
