= Teresa Miller (academic) =

American professor (1962–2021)

- Born: February 20, 1962; Fort Benning, Georgia, US
- Died: August 6, 2021 (aged 59); Manhattan, New York
- Occupations: Administrator, Professor, Educator, Author

Academic background
- Education: Duke University (BA); Harvard Law School (JD); University of Wisconsin (ML)

Academic work
- Institutions: University of Miami School of Law; University at Buffalo; University at Buffalo Law School; State University of New York
- Main interests: Criminal procedure, immigration law, prisoner law

Teresa Ann Miller (February 20, 1962 – August 6, 2021) was an American professor, author, legal scholar, educator, and administrator. At the time of her death in August 2021, she was senior vice chancellor for strategic initiatives and chief diversity officer to State University of New York (SUNY) Chancellor Jim Malatras. She previously served as vice chancellor and chief of staff to Chancellor Kristina M. Johnson.

Before moving to SUNY in 2018, Miller had been vice provost for inclusive excellence at the University of Buffalo. She had been a professor of law at the University at Buffalo Law School since 1995.

As a law professor at Buffalo, Miller taught broadly but was probably best known for her work on prison law and her efforts within the Attica Correctional Facility.

== Early life and education ==
Teresa Ann Miller was born in Fort Benning on February 20, 1962. She was raised in the tidewater region of Virginia and Chapel Hill, North Carolina. Miller was the daughter of a decorated Army aviator, Billy G. Miller, and a school teacher, Henrietta Thomas Dabney, who would go on to earn a Ph.D. from UNC Chapel Hill and become a dean. Miller had five siblings.

Miller graduated from Booker T. Washington High School in Norfolk, Virginia. She then attended Duke University, where she was an Angier B. Duke Scholar. She received her A.B. in psychology from Duke in 1983.

In 1986, she earned her J.D. from Harvard Law School.

In 1989, she earned her Master of Laws (LL.M.) degree from the University of Wisconsin at Madison, graduating as a William H. Hastie Fellow.

== Career ==
After graduating from law school, Miller taught at the University of Miami School of Law from 1986 to 1988. From 1990 to 1991, she worked as a judicial law clerk at the US District Court in the Southern District of Florida for Judge William Hoeveler.

Miller became a professor of law at the University at Buffalo in 1995. She taught immigration law, prisoner law, criminal procedure, and contracts. Miller was promoted to the rank of full professor of law with tenure.

In March 2014, Miller was appointed the University of Buffalo’s first vice provost for equity and inclusion, a title that was changed in 2017 to vice provost for inclusive excellence.

As vice provost, Miller established the Office of Inclusive Excellence and created the university’s first strategic diversity and inclusion plan.

In 2016, Miller launched the Difficult Conversations (DIFCON) Series. These university-wide discussions invited students, staff, and faculty to come together and share their opinions on controversial topics in a safe and civil environment.

In January, 2018, Miller accepted the position of senior vice chancellor and chief of staff to SUNY Chancellor Kristina Johnson.

=== Professional affiliations ===
Inside and outside of the University, Miller was deeply involved with prison and immigration law and diversity initiatives.

As a member of the American Bar Association (ABA) Task Force on Standards for the Legal Status of Prisoners, Miller helped rewrite the Standards on the Legal Status of Prisoners (2010). Miller also served on the Board of the Prisoner Legal Services of New York as well as the Board of the Correctional Association of New York.

Miller was a volunteer with the Attica Correctional Facility's Lifers Organization, and she helped organize visits to Attica from performers in the Glimmerglass Festival for opera performances in the prison. In 2015, Verdi's Macbeth was performed, and in 2016, there were selections from La bohème (1896). By 2017, the Glimmerglass Festival performers had performed three times in the prison.

=== Prison documentary ===
In 2009, Miller produced and co-directed a 24-minute short documentary entitled Encountering Attica. The documentary takes place within the Attica Correctional Facility, where Miller had worked extensively. The documentary focused on the year-long interactions between three first year Buffalo law students and Attica inmates who were serving life sentences.

In addition to teaching prison law and advocating for the rights of prisoners, Miller also analyzed the experiences of correction officers who work within the prison system; she concluded that officers and prisoners face many of the same experiences and difficulties.

== Personal life ==
Miller married Daniel Mikofsky in 1998 and they had three children. They separated in 2013. She later partnered with Paula DiPerna.

Miller died on August 6, 2021, in Manhattan, New York. Her daughter, Seychelle Mikofsky, said her death was caused by gallbladder cancer.

== Select bibliography ==
=== Journal articles ===
- “Sex & Surveillance: Gender, Privacy and the Sexualization of Power in Prison”, 10 George Mason University Civil Rights Law Journal 291-356 (2000)
- Keeping the Government’s Hands Off Our Bodies: Mapping a Feminist Legal Theory Approach to Privacy in Cross-Gender Prison Searches, 4 Buffalo Criminal Law Review 861-889 (2001)
- “Citizenship and Severity: Recent Immigration Reforms and the New Penology”, 17 Georgetown Immigration Law Journal 611-666 (2003)
- “Blurring the Boundaries Between Immigration and Crime Control after Sept. 11th”, 25 Boston College Third World Law Journal 1-45 (2005)
- “A New Look At Neo-liberal Economic Policies and the Criminalization of Undocumented Migration,” 61 SMU Law Review 171-186 (2008)
- “Lessons Learned, Lessons Lost: Immigration Enforcement’s Failed Experiment with Penal Severity,” (38 Fordham Urban Law Journal 217-246 (2010)
- “Encountering Attica: Documentary Filmmaking As Pedagogical Tool,” 62 J. Legal Educ. 231 (Nov. 2012)
- “Bright Lines, Black Bodies: The Florence Strip Search Case and Its Dire Repercussions,” 46 Akron L. Rev. 433 (2013)

=== Books ===
- Christopher Mele and Teresa Miller (eds.), Civil Penalties, Social Consequences (Routledge Publishing Co., 2005)
  - Chapter 1: “Collateral Civil Penalties as Techniques of Social Policy”
  - Chapter 3: “By Any Means Necessary: Collateral Civil Penalties of Non-US Citizens and the War on Terror”

=== Book chapters ===
- "The Impact of Mass Incarceration on Immigration Policy", Ch. 13 in Marc Mauer and Meda Chesney-Lind (eds.) Invisible Punishment: The Collateral Consequences of Mass Incarceration, New Press (2002)
- “Incarcerated Masculinities ”, Ch.17 in Athena D. Mutua (ed.), Progressive Black Masculinities (Routledge Publishing Co., 2006)
