= Gregg S. Fisher =

American investment manager

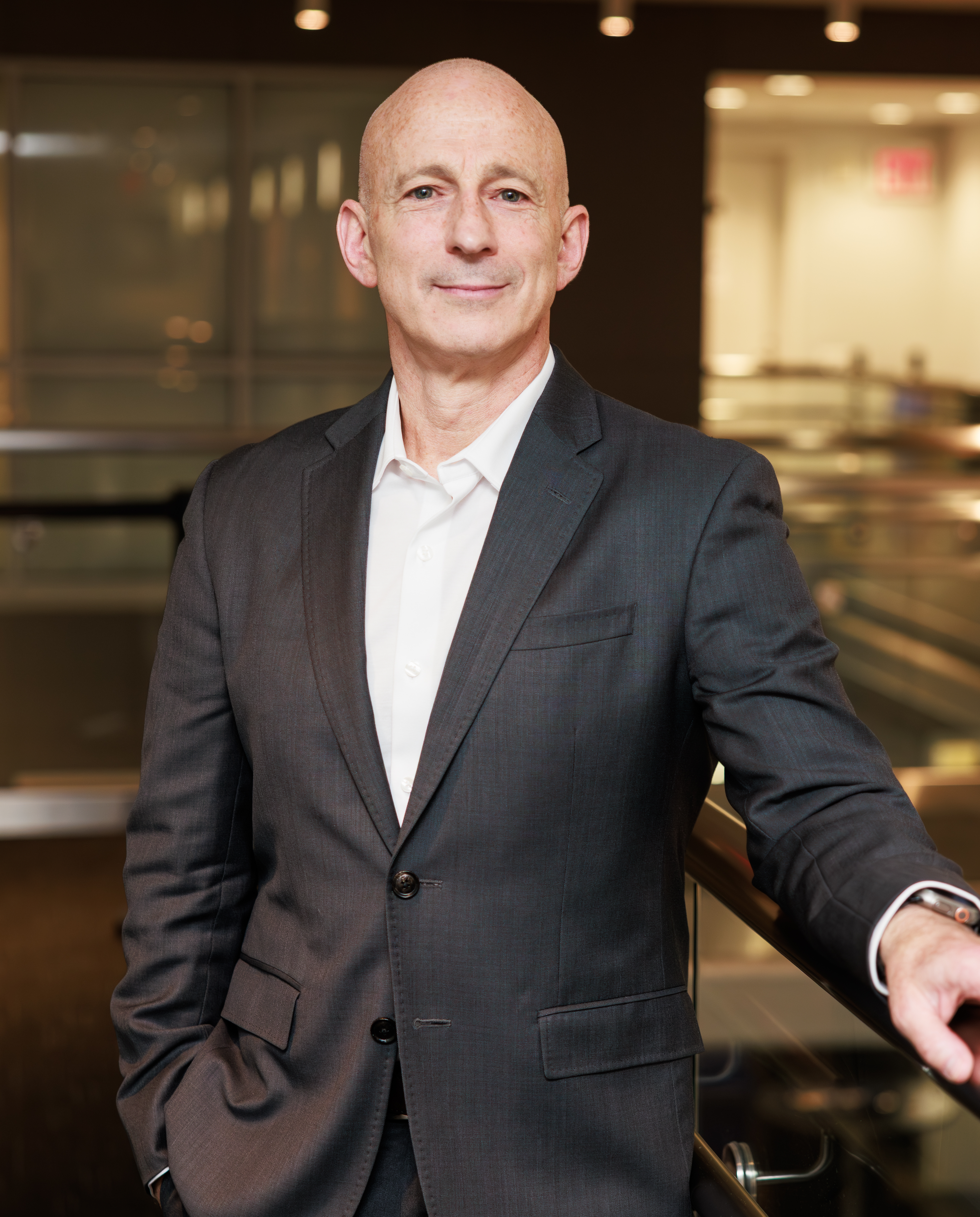
- Born: New York, New York
- Education: University at Buffalo
- Occupations: Analyst & Investor
- Employer: Quent Capital
- Known for: Pioneer in factor investing Trademarking Multi-Factor Investing
- Website: Quent Capital

Gregg S. Fisher (born 1970) is a leading investor and analyst, an experienced portfolio manager, and a recognized pioneer in systematic and factor investing. Fisher is the Founder, Analyst, and Portfolio Manager of Quent Capital. Over a 33-year career, he successfully navigated six bear markets while building the company into one of the oldest and largest privately owned asset management firms in the United States. The firm features a global small-company long/short equity investment strategy and has approximately $3 billion in assets under management and advisement.

== Early life and education ==
Fisher was raised in a Jewish Family in Queens, New York, by his father in a working-class family. Fisher earned a Bachelor of Science in Finance from the University at Buffalo School of Management in 1992. He worked multiple jobs and relied on financial aid to attend college. While there, his finance professor Joe Ogden introduced him to A Random Walk Down Wall Street, which Fisher has cited as influential in shaping his approach to investing along with his experience growing up in the industry watching the hyperhazardness of investor decisions. He later obtained a certificate in financial planning from New York University and studied at Harvard Business School. Fisher is a CFA charterholder and a Certified Financial Planner.

== Investment career ==
=== Early years ===
Fisher grew up in his family's tax preparation business, which was founded in Brooklyn in 1978 and still operates today as part of Quent Capital. As a teenager in the mid-1980s, Fisher was responsible for recording investment transactions by hand. When personal computers became available, Fisher transferred this data into spreadsheet programs. By the time he left for college in 1988, he had compiled hundreds of thousands of data points, which he could sort by brokerage firm, stock name, or holding period.

=== Founding his firm ===
Upon graduating from University at Buffalo in 1992, Fisher founded his own investment management firm. He sold a drum set his father had given him for $900 and used the funds to purchase a computer to launch the business.

This period was highly active for academic finance research. Researchers such as Bill Sharpe, Eugene Fama, Kenneth French, and Sheridan Titman published foundational papers that influenced investment management. As computers and data became available for market analysis, Fisher adopted these data-driven investment strategies.

=== Factor investing and Multi-Factor ===
Fisher was among the first investment managers to offer factor-based strategies to individual investors. He trademarked the term "Multi-Factor" in the context of mutual fund investing before the approach became mainstream in the investment industry. Fisher launched mutual funds employing Multi-Factor strategies, including a U.S. growth fund in 2010, an international growth fund in 2012, and a global REIT fund in 2013. These strategies established track records that consistently ranked in the top quartile and top decile of their peer groups. A little more than two decades after founding the firm, it had grown to serve over 2,000 clients and have approximately $5 billion in assets under management and advisement.

=== Global small-cap strategy launch ===
After a period of research and strategic refocusing, Fisher launched the Quent Long Short Global Small Cap Strategy in 2020, concentrating on global small-cap growth stocks. With investor attention increasingly (at that time and now too) concentrated on the largest companies in the market and the Private Equity Markets, Fisher sees significant opportunity in smaller enterprises that he views as undervalued and under-followed by analysts. Fisher's approach blends disciplined fundamental analysis with quantitative tools to identify intangible drivers of long-term business success.

=== Quent Capital today ===
With roots dating back to 1978, Quent Capital is one of the country's largest privately held asset and wealth management firms. Headquartered in Manhattan, the firm operates with a team of professionals across finance, research, and operations, and maintains a global network of partners and collaborators, and is known for its long-term strategy in growth investing.

Quent Capital combines investment management through its small company strategy, wealth and asset management services, family office services and tax planning. Fisher describes it as a multi-family office, with his own capital invested alongside that of a select group of other like-minded high net worth families and investors seeking institutional scale and resources with the personalized attention of a privately owned firm.

The firm oversees approximately $3 billion in assets under management and advisement. Its performance has consistently ranked in the top quartile and top decile over its multi-decade track record.

== Investment philosophy ==
Fisher's investment philosophy is grounded in the application of science and data, viewed through an entrepreneurial lens. He applies a research-driven approach that blends fundamental analysis with sophisticated quantitative tools. He has said that evidence-based investing, when combined with human judgment, allows him to uncover intangible drivers of long-term business success.

At the core of his work as an analyst and investor is a focus on collaborative discovery. Fisher collaborates on research with academics including Sheridan Titman. He founded the Gerstein Fisher Research Center in 2009.

Fisher maintains an active dialogue with founders and CEOs across the global economy. These relationships generate research ideas, bring new perspectives to his investment process, and inform his strategies.

== Boards & advisory roles ==
Fisher contributes to the investment management field through board service and academic engagement. He is a member of the New York Academy of Sciences, a community committed to propelling scientific discovery forward and inspiring the next generation of innovators.

From 2009 to 2015, he served as an adjunct professor in the Department of Finance and Risk Engineering at NYU Tandon School of Engineering. He serves on the program committee for The Institute for Quantitative Research in Finance (The Q Group), a leading forum for quantitative investment research. Fisher chairs the investment committee for the University at Buffalo Foundation's endowment, which manages nearly $2 billion in assets. He also serves on advisory councils for Columbia University's Wealth Management program and the University of Texas McCombs School of Business Wealth Management Program. He also has served on the board of the LaGuardia High School of Music & Art and Performing Arts.

== Research and academic work ==
Fisher has been a prolific contributor to investment research, authoring dozens of peer-reviewed articles in leading financial journals including the Journal of Investment Management, Journal of Portfolio Management, Journal of Financial Planning, and Journal of Index Investing. His research spans factor investing, momentum strategies, fundamental indexation, and the role of intangible assets in equity valuation.

He has collaborated extensively with prominent academic researchers, including Sheridan Titman of the University of Texas at Austin, with whom he has co-authored multiple papers examining topics such as combining value and momentum factors, characteristic-sorted portfolio returns, and country size tilts in equity portfolios. Other research collaborators have included Philip Maymin, Cristian Tiu, and Nicholas Bollen. Fisher's 2014 paper "Momentum's hidden sensitivity to the starting day" received a conference award.

He advances this work through the Quent Research Collaborative, engaging with leading minds from institutions including Harvard, the University at Buffalo, the University of Texas and others to publish new research. That commitment is further anchored by a physical research center located at the University at Buffalo, where faculty and students in finance, data science, and engineering come together to explore new frontiers in investment science.

== Thought leadership and media ==
Fisher is the host of The Q Factor an award-winning podcast where he engages in probing discussions with global thinkers regarding how data and scientific innovation are reshaping our world. Guests have included Nobel laureate Robert C. Merton, Ariel Ekblaw of the MIT Space Exploration Initiative, Dan-Avi Landau of the New York Genome Center, Harvard Business School professors Frances Frei and Joseph Fuller, and Yale sociologist Nicholas Christakis.

In addition to his academic publications, Fisher publishes practitioner-focused research and commentary on topics including artificial intelligence, small-cap investing, deglobalization, job quality metrics, and the role of intangible assets in business valuation.

== Philanthropy ==
Through the Fisher Family Fellows program, Fisher expands access to mentorship for high-potential students, fostering curiosity, evidence-based inquiry, and scientific discovery in future leaders.

== Personal life ==
Fisher married his wife, Cynthia, in 2000. They have two children, Joshua and Abigail, and reside in New York City and the Hamptons.

== See also ==
- List of University at Buffalo people
