= Olive P. Lester =

American psychologist

- Born: Olive Peckham Lester; December 19, 1903; Lancaster, Erie County, New York
- Died: October 10, 1996 (aged 92); Amherst, Erie County, New York
- Other names: Olive Lester
- Occupation: psychologist
- Years active: 1924–1974

Olive P. Lester (December 19, 1903 – October 10, 1996) was an American academic and outspoken advocate for women. Her research in social psychology concerned contemporary issues of her time and she lectured frequently on subjects regarding personality and social perception. The first woman to serve as a department chair in the College of Arts and Sciences at the University of Buffalo, she held the post longer than any of her successors. She designed a curriculum for the School of Nursing at UB, receiving numerous awards for teaching, and was made a fellow of the American Psychological Association in 1932.

== Early life ==
Olive Peckham Lester was born on December 19, 1903, in Lancaster, Erie County, New York to Martha (née Zurbrick) and Levant D. Lester. Her father was a lawyer and Lester had a younger sister, Ilma. The Peckham family were well established in Lancaster, having immigrated from Connecticut in 1808 and organizing the Lancaster Presbyterian Church. The family moved in to the property at 5454 Broadway in 1912, which would remain Lester's residence until her death. She was educated at Lancaster High School and went on to study psychology at the University of Buffalo (UB). After graduating in 1924, as the first person to earn a bachelor's degree in psychology at the school, she began her graduate studies and worked as an assistant in the psychology lab.

== Career ==
In 1925, while working on her master's degree, which she was awarded in 1926, Lester began working as an instructor at UB in the psychology department of the College of Arts and Sciences. In 1932, she earned her PhD in philosophy through the University of Chicago, while carrying on her research and teaching full-time at UB. She studied functionalism under the tutelage of Harvey A. Carr and Arthur Gilbert Bills, completing summer classes under Edward B. Titchener of Cornell University in structuralism. Upon receipt of her PhD, in 1932, she was elected as a Fellow of the American Psychological Association. During the day she taught in the psychology department and then taught adult education courses at Millard Fillmore College in the evenings until the war began. During the war, she taught a course in human relations at a local airplane facility. In 1939, Lester was promoted to Associate Professor and seven years later she earned a full professorship.

Lester was involved in the study of social psychology. One of her early studies involved the impact of language skills upon the education process. Studying students who had to repeat grades, she determined that mental or physical age did not correlate to ability, but rather proficiency with English did. She argued that tests which placed students on the basis of their language ability, such as the Stanford-Binet test should be used to determine the entrance grade of immigrant students. In a 1940 study, she evaluated whether higher education impacted religious values. The findings produced by Lester and her co-author Richard Bugelski mirrored similar findings at other universities that in the pre-war era beliefs liberalized, but as World War II proceeded there was a shift to conservatism. She created the first curriculum in psychology for student nurses, teaching courses at Children's Hospital, Deaconess Hospital and the E. J. Meyer Memorial Hospital and received three honors from the Nursing School at UB in recognition of her teaching.

In 1952, when Carlton Scofield took a leave of absence to work for the United States Department of the Army, the women professors at UB, including Lester's close friend Emily Webster, rallied to support Lester as acting chair. She served in that capacity between 1952 and 1956, and then permanently became the chair of the psychology department when Scofield officially resigned to accept an appointment in Karachi, Pakistan with the U. S. Information Agency. She was the first woman to serve as a chair of the College of Arts and Sciences at UB and one of the first women in the country to lead a psychology department. She served as chair of the department until 1966 and when she stepped down was succeeded by B. Richard Bugelski. She held the chair longer than any of the successors to the department. In 1971, she was recognized for her outstanding teaching contributions by the College of Arts and Sciences and in 1973, received the university's Distinguished Alumni Award, before retiring in 1974.

A frequent community lecturer on social perceptions, Lester spoke on many issues, such as during the war debunking the myth of innate racial superiority and confirming that racism was a learned behavior. During the 1960s, she lectured on the changing role of women and how social norms, rather than their innate abilities, restricted women's lives She was vocal about the discrimination she had experienced as a woman, like being paid less than her male colleagues and receiving promotions long after her male peers. Lester was also involved in community affairs in Lancaster, serving as a trustee for the Lancaster Public Library for more than two decades and working on adult education projects with the Lancaster Public Schools.

== Death and legacy ==
Lester died on October 10, 1996, in Amherst, New York, at Millard Fillmore Suburban Hospital. As part of the University at Buffalo's oral history project, she was the subject of an interview conducted in 1978.

== Selected works ==
- Lester, Olive Peckham (1932). "Mental set in relation to retroactive inhibition". Journal of Experimental Psychology. XV (6): 299. ISSN 0096-3445.
- Bugelski, Richard; Lester, Olive P. (1940). "Changes in Attitudes in a Group of College Students During Their College Course and After Graduation". The Journal of Social Psychology. 12 (2): 319–332. doi:10.1080/00224545.1940.9921476. ISSN 0022-4545.
- Troup, Evelyn; Lester, Olive P. (1942). "The Social Competence of Identical Twins". The Journal of Genetic Psychology. 60: 167–175. ISSN 0022-1325.
