= ITNAmerica =

American nonprofit transportation network

Independent Transportation Network
- Type: Nonprofit Organization
- Industry: Transportation
- Founded: Portland, Maine, United States (2005; 21 years ago)
- Founder: Katherine Freund
- Headquarters: Portland, Maine, United States
- Area served: 12 U.S. States
- Website: www.itnamerica.org

The Independent Transportation Network of America (ITNAmerica) is a nonprofit transportation network for seniors and people with visual impairments in the United States. It was founded in 2005 by Katherine Freund, the organization's current President.

INTAmericas main service is a network of affiliated nonprofits nationwide that offers ride services to the older people and visually impaired people. Roughly 40 percent of ITN rides come from volunteer drivers, though the model uses paid drivers as well.

They served their 1 millionth ride in May 2018.

== Overview ==
ITNAmerica operates through an affiliate system, with 13 affiliated organizations in communities across 12 states as of July 2018. Affiliates are independent 501c3 nonprofits, each with their own board of directors. The ITN model is designed to work in communities with a population of at least 200,000. ITNAmerica helps communities develop their own local ITN service, supporting affiliates on an ongoing basis, and provides access to ITNRides, a proprietary software system for running the service. The network helps all affiliates to achieve sustainability.

ITN affiliates rely on the services of volunteer drivers, but often employ the use of paid drivers. Most drivers are in their fifties and sixties. Each member rider with ITNAmerica's transportation service has a Personal Transportation Account, which eliminates the need for on-site transactions during transportation. Rides with ITN cost about half the taxi fare for an equivalent distance and are locally subsidized by funding from businesses, philanthropic organizations, and other sources other than taxpayer dollars. Payments for rides are drawn from rider's transportation accounts, which ITNAmerica tracks through a payment system accessible to all its affiliates.

ITNAmerica's payment options allow drivers to plan for their future transportation needs by accumulating credits in a Personal Transportation Account by participating as volunteer drivers. Family members and friends who volunteer to drive for ITN can use these credits to pay for future rides.

The CarTrade program allows ITN members to trade their no longer used cars to pay for their rides. Credits from trading a car are also tracked through the Personal Transportation Account.

ITNAmerica has facilitated more than 1 million rides to date throughout the affiliate network.

== History ==
The organization grew out of an accident in 1988 involving Freund's son, who when he was 3-years-old was struck and injured by a car driven by an 84-year-old man. Instead of lashing out at the driver, however, Freund recognized older people face limited mobility options. Normal changes in vision, coordination and reaction times make it harder to drive, but the American transportation system is largely designed around private car ownership. The issue, Freund saw, was not older drivers, but a transportation system unable to keep pace with the natural process of aging.

Thus ITN was born. It started in Portland, Maine, in 1995, and then a decade later began incorporating affiliates nationwide. It was then that ITN became ITNAmerica.

== Model ==
ITN works largely with older people, both as volunteers and as riders. Many people post-retirement find themselves with extra time on their hands and in a position to volunteer. ITN recruits these people as drives. And in driving those who are unable to drive themselves, these volunteers earn Ride Credits for every mile they drive. They can then bank those credits their own transportation future, give them to someone else or donate them.

In order to meet the real world needs of older adults, the ITN model must maintain flexibility. Most drivers, for example, do not give up driving all at once. Often, night driving is the first place where people notice difficulty, so they arrange their schedule to drive only during daylight hours. A driver might be perfectly safe at noontime but have trouble seeing after sunset. The ITN model is built to accommodate such transitions, even if they unfold over years. The driver who sees well in daytime but struggles in low light might volunteer as a driver during the day and be an ITN rider in the evening. Alternatively, an ITN volunteer might use the service for have a medical appointment that necessitates a ride home after. The ITN model allow people to be earning their ride miles even as they use the service, being both part of the transportation solution and a beneficiary of it.

The age of membership with ITN is age 60 (though it can vary by affiliate) and is not contingent upon whether the person is still driving or not. ITN offers "dignified transportation," using private vehicles to transport people rather than shuttle buses. Many riders use the front seat rather than the back, and rides are more similar to a trip with friends than a taxi fare. No money is exchanged at the time of the ride, and there is no tipping. Drivers offer "arm-through-arm, door-through-door service," meaning they meet the rider at their door and escort them to the vehicle, and do the same from the car to the destination. Riders will also assist with packages or bags. ITN vehicles are not equipped for electric wheelchairs or other specialty equipment. Riders must be able to transfer themselves in and out of the vehicle with limited assistance.

== Ride Credits ==
The ITN model uses Ride Credits to help alleviate the financial constraints that might keep some people from otherwise accessing adequate mobility. The ITN CarTrade Program, for example, allows people to trade in their unused vehicles in exchange for Ride Credits, turning a depreciating asset into mobility. The ITN affiliate sells the vehicle, and the value of the sale gets transferred into the member's Personal Transportation Account. The member can then either use those credits, share them with someone else, or donate them.

Ride Credits also work across the ITN system: A volunteer can spend time driving for one affiliate, and the credits they earn through driving they could then send to a friend or family member in an entirely different part of the country, provided that other community is also covered by an ITN affiliate. The reciprocity of Ride Credits across the ITN network is one of the hallmarks of the ITN system. It is modeled after the Japanese system of Fureai Kippu.

== Policy ==
ITNAmerica offers senior transportation and sustainable community mobility resources to students, researchers, policymakers and family members everywhere. The 50 State Policy Project is a policy database for transportation in all 50 states. It focuses on policies that create incentives or remove barriers to the use of private resources for sustainable transportation.

== Rides in Sight ==
Rides in Sight is a nationwide information and referral service that helps seniors and visually-impaired adults find transportation options in their local area. Built by ITNAmerica, Rides in Sight features both an online, publicly available searchable database as well as a line that people can call to learn about the transportation options in their area. Each caller's situation is taken into account before transportation referrals are provided—visual impairment, mobility devices, age, length of trip—to ensure the best referral. Rides in Sight is a program of ITNAmerica.

== Funding ==
ITNAmerica is a registered 501(c)(3) nonprofit. The organization is funded via multiple avenues: revenue from local affiliates, corporate sponsorship, grants, private and individual donations and research revenue. The ITN model does not rely on government funding. Affiliates can accept government support initially, but within the first few years they are expected to develop a sustainable business model free from reliance on public money.

== Nationwide Affiliate Network ==
The ITN Nationwide Network, which ITNAmerica supports, includes 13 independent nonprofits in 12 states stretching from Maine to Florida to California. In previous years the network grew as large as 25 affiliates.
