= Donnica Moore =

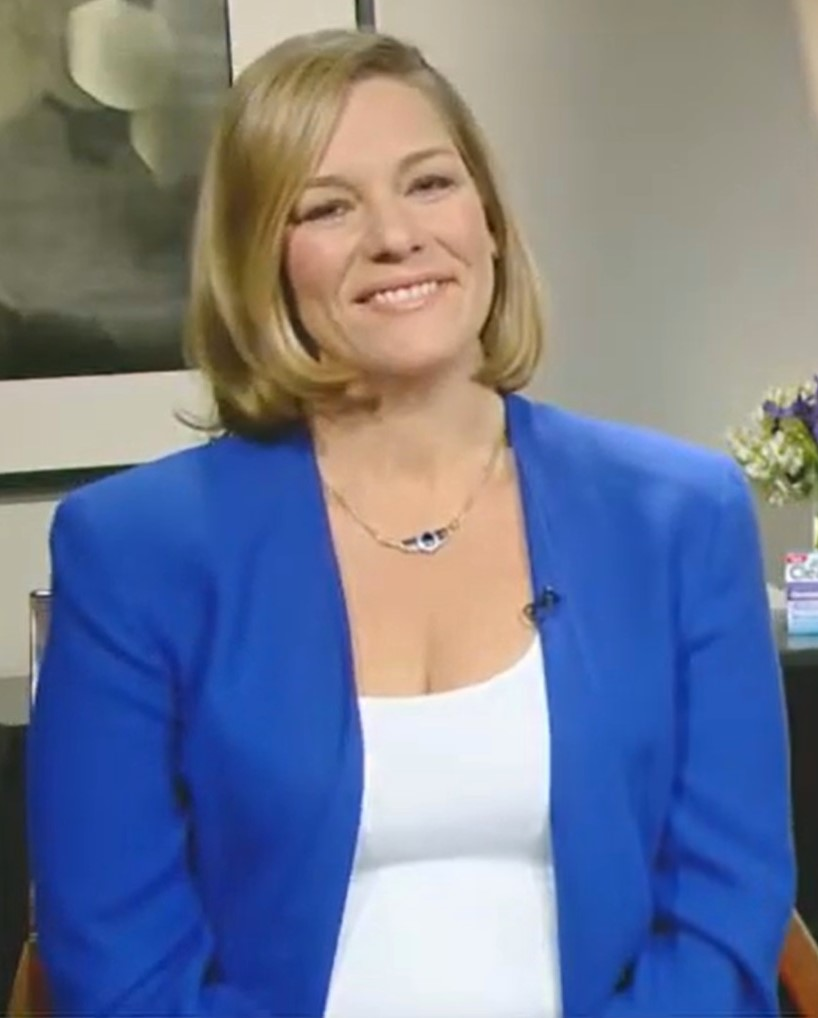
Moore in 2013

Donnica Moore is an American physician and women's health advocate, best known as an author and media commentator on women's health concerns. Moore, who is known as Dr. Donnica, has made multiple appearances on U.S. television shows such as The Dr. Oz Show, The Today Show, CNN, The Oprah Winfrey Show, The Tyra Banks Show, The View, ABC, Anderson Live, Good Morning America Health, and is quoted in several articles on the health website WebMD. In 2007 Moore gained attention for teaching TV presenter Tyra Banks to breast feed on Banks' television talk show. Footage of the lesson accumulated over two million views on YouTube. Her book, Women's Health for Life, is a popular resource on women's health.

== Early life and family ==
After growing up in New York, New York, Moore entered Princeton University at age 16, graduating in 1981. She was the oldest of six children of Dennis B. and Toby Moore. She attended the University College of Dublin School of Medicine as a Rotary International Graduate Fellow before receiving her M.D. from SUNY Buffalo in 1986.

== Career ==
Moore completed her residency training in Obstetrics and Gynecology at Temple University, with an additional year in family medicine at Memorial Hospital of Burlington County, New Jersey. According to a 2003 profile in Women in Medicine, she did not complete her training because after undergoing a spinal surgery, her surgeon recommended she not continue a physically demanding medical practice.

After leaving her residency, Moore became Medical Director for Sandoz pharmaceuticals, and made public statements on the company's behalf regarding the safety at least one Sandoz product under FDA scrutiny. She established Sapphire Women's Health Group in 1997, launched a nationally syndicated radio segment called “Dr. Donnica’s Women’s Health Report” in 2000; and launched the award-winning women's health information website www.DrDonnica.com in 2000. She is currently the host of the podcast “In The Ladies’ Room with Dr. Donnica” and has interviewed guests including actress Vicki Lawrence, 3-time Olympic Champion Nancy Hogshead-Makar, and former Editor-in-Chief of More Magazine Lesly Jane Seymour.

Moore has been a medical advisor or medical advisory board member to several companies including DuPont; Helm Pharmaceuticals; SPD; JoyLux; and Exxclaim Capital.

=== Publications ===
Moore is co-editor, with Sarah Jarvis, of the popular women's health book Women's Health for Life, (ISBN 0756642779) published in March 2009, by DK Publishing.

She is listed as a peer reviewer for the Journal of the American Medical Women's Association in 1994, and as an editorial board member in 1997.

=== Organizational affiliations ===
Moore serves on the advisory board of cancerandcareers.org.

Moore is on the Board of Directors of the Society for Women's Health Research.

Moore is on the Medical Advisory Board of The Dr. Oz Show. She is a member of the HealthCare Business Women's Association

=== Appearances ===
- CNN in 2005 and 2006,
- NBC The Today Show
- The Doctors’ Channel
- Weekly guest on the ABC Show “Good Morning America Health”: (Women and Migraines; 9 Ways to Prevent a Stroke
- The Steve Harvey Show

She has also been the spokesdoctor for several national health education campaigns including: Life Supplemented Campaign; the Choose Your Move Campaign for RLS; Crest Enamel Health; Shingles Awareness; and the ClearBlue Advanced Ovulation Test Launch.

Women Take Charge: &; and Superfoods.

Moore has done video interviews on career topics for Princeton University Career Services (How do you give your kids useful career advice? You become an expert by doing the job and Leading Women Entrepreneurs US. She has also been interviewed on her career by Bill Wooditch on “The Unstoppables”.

Moore claims to have 550 television appearances as of March, 2008.

=== Awards ===
On November 16, 2007, Moore was one of twelve recipients of the Women in Government Presidential Leadership Award for her efforts to promote cervical cancer prevention. She was honored as one of the Top 25 Leading Women Entrepreneurs in 2017;

In May 2021, Moore was awarded an Honorary Doctorate of Science (DSc) degree from the State University of New York.

== Works ==
=== Articles ===
- WebMD articles: WebMD Health Search

=== Videos ===
- Summary of television appearances: Women’s Health for Life Appearances on ABC's Good Morning America Health: “XMRV”; “Dystonia” PBS Special: “Feel Grand with Jane Seymour: Sex Reeducation”
- Appearances on the Tyra Banks Show: "Tyra's Lesson in Breastfeeding", "Your Most Intimate Questions Answered: Find out what's going on DOWN THERE", and "Best Week Ever".
- Appearances on The Morning Show with Mark and Juliet: "Can Breastfeeding Make Your Child Smarter" and "The Signs of Chronic Fatigue Syndrome".
- Appearances on The View: "Highlights", "Menopause Gum", "Special episode on women's health issues", and "Women's health issues episode recap".
- Other appearances: Life... Supplemented on WCJB-ABC, WPTY, Myths on Women's Health on WNCR, and YouTube.
