= Katherine Freund =

American community transport activist

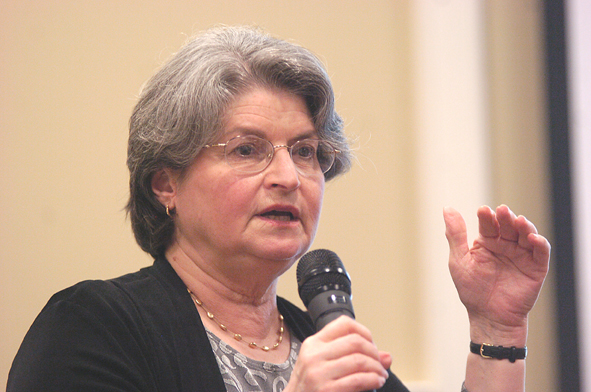
- Born: Katherine Freund; May 5, 1950 (age 76); Long Island, New York, US
- Education: University at Buffalo (B.A.); University of Southern Maine (M.A.)
- Occupation: President of ITNAmerica
- Children: 2
- Website: Official website

Katherine Freund (born May 5, 1950) is an American activist for community based non-profit transportation for older adults and people with special needs. She founded the Independent Transportation Network (ITN) in 1995, which in 2005 grew into ITNAmerica, which leads a national network for sustainable community-based transportation grounded in policy, research, education and technology. ITNAmerica promotes lifelong mobility for seniors.

== Early life ==
Freund was born on Mitchel Field Air Force Base, Long Island, New York. She attended Levittown Memorial High School and completed her degree in English Literature at The State University of New York at Buffalo in 1972. She studied English literature at the University of Washington from 1972-1974. After working in horticulture and free-lance journalism, hosting gardening programs on Television and radio show, she received a Master of Arts in Public Policy from the Edmund S. Muskie School of Public Service at the University of Southern Maine.

== Senior transportation ==
In 1988 Freund's three-year-old son, Ryan, was run over by an 84-year-old driver who claimed to have mistaken him for a dog. Ryan survived a traumatic brain injury from the accident and he ultimately made a full recovery from his injuries. Freund drew inspiration from the incident to seek alternative means of transportation for older adults who limit or stop driving because of age related changes. The ITN model operates on a system of rides in private automobiles, with the comfort, independence and dignity riders experienced when they drove their own cars. Freund later added services for people with special transportation needs. She chaired the Task Force to Study the Safe Mobility of Maine's Aging Population, created by the Maine Legislature in 1993. In 1995 she founded the Independent Transportation Network (ITN), initially funded by AARP, the Federal Transit Administration, the National Highway Traffic Safety Administration, the Transportation Research Board and numerous private philanthropies.

In 2005 Freund was appointed by former President George W. Bush to the Advisory Committee for the White House Conference on Aging. At the same time, with a business planning grant from the Federal Transit Administration and the Atlantic Philanthropies, Freund founded ITNAmerica. The following year, the Atlantic Philanthropies helped fund the creation of a nationwide ITNAmerica transportation network. Freund served for twelve years on the Transportation Research Board's Committee on the Safe Mobility of Seniors, and Chaired the Joint Subcommittee on Transportation Options for Seniors.

== Research, policy, technology and education ==
Freund created ITNAmerica with a goal to focus on research, policy, and education to improve the safety and mobility of older people.

== Public advocacy and awards ==
As a recognized expert in the field of transportation for older adults, Katherine Freund has spent three decades offering her services as a public speaker to educate the public on the problems associated with senior transportation and mobility. Katherine is a 2012 Askoka Fellow. She was featured in the Wall Street Journal as one of the “12 People Who Are Changing Your Retirement,” and on CNN’s “Breakthrough Women” series. In 2013, Katherine testified about ITNAmerica and sustainable senior transportation before the US Senate Special Committee on Aging. She has received the AARP Inspire Award, the Maxwell Pollack Award from the Gerontological Society of America, and the Social Enterprise Alliance Award for Leadership in Innovative Enterprise Ideas. Katherine is also the recipient of the Access Award from the American Foundation for the Blind, the Archstone Award for Excellence in Program Innovation from the American Public Health Association, and the Giraffe Award for sticking her neck out for the common good. Katherine has participated in more than 150 national and international panels and conference sessions on alternative transportation for older adults and people with special transportation needs. She has spoken in Canada, Australia, Germany, Ireland, England, Switzerland, South Korea, Taiwan, India and the United Arab Emirates. Her speaking engagements are a key part of ITN’s educational efforts.

== Family and personal life ==
Freund lives in Portland, Maine. She has one daughter, one son, and three grandchildren.

== Awards and honors ==
- 2018: Senate Resolution 491 Honored ITNAmerica for delivering 1,000,000 rides
- 2016: Access Award, American Foundation for the Blind
- 2012: Ashoka Fellow
- 2011: CNN Breakthrough Women
- 2009: AARP Inspire Award Honoree
- 2008: Wall Street Journal – 12 People Who Are Changing Your Retirement
- 2006: American Gerontological Society Maxwell A. Pollack Award for Productive Aging
- 2006: Social Enterprise Alliance Leadership in Innovative Enterprise Ideas Award
- 2005: Excellence Award, Northeast Transportation Safety Conference
- 2004: American Public Health Association Archstone Award for Excellence in Program Innovation
- 2004: Geriatric Best Practices, South Carolina Hospital Association and the Duke Endowment
- 2000-2002: Fellow, National Transit Institute, Rutgers University
- 1998: Giraffe Hero Commendation for Sticking Your Neck Out for the Common Good
- 1996: Nationwide Insurance, On Your Side Highway Safety Award
- 1992: Greater Portland Landmarks Award for Citizen Activism in Historic Preservation

Freund has conducted 14 National Transit Institute Workshops, and participated in more than 150 national and international panels, conference sessions, and speaking engagements on alternative transportation for seniors. Among other places, she has presented on her organization's work in Australia, Canada, Ireland, England, Germany, Switzerland, South Korea and Taiwan.

== Publications ==
- Siegfried, A.L.; Bayne, A.; Beck, L.F.; Freund, K. Older Adult Willingness to Use Fully Autonomous Vehicle (FAV) Ride Sharing. Geriatrics 2021, 6, 47.
- Siegfried, A.L.; Bayne, A.; Beck, L.F.; Freund, K. Barriers and Facilitators of Older Adults’ Use of Ride Share Services. Journal of Transport & Health, Volume 21, 2021.
- "Driving Self-Regulation and Ride Service Utilization in a Multi-Community, Multi-State Sample of U.S. Older Adults" Traffic Injury Prevention, April 2017. Bird DC. Freund K. Fortinsky RH. Staplin L. West BA. Bergen G.
- "How do older adults transition to driving cessation? Characteristics of transition stages defined by latent class analysis" Journal of Safety Research 2017. Bergen G. West BA. Luo F. Bird DC. Freund K. Fortinsky RH. Staplin L.
- “Getting from Here to There: Maine’s Elder Transportation Challenge” Maine Policy Review, Freund, Summer/Fall, Vol. 24, No. 2, 2015.
- “Policy Prescriptions to Preserve Mobility for Seniors—A Dose of Realism” Accident Analysis and Prevention, Staplin and Freund, December 2013.
- "Aging, Mobility and the Model T: Approaches to Smart Community Transportation," Generations, Journal of the American Society on Aging, pp. 76–81, Freund and Vine, Fall 2010.
- "Dignified Transportation for Seniors," CCQ Capital Commons Quarterly, pp. 13–16, July 2008.
- "Public and Private Policy Initiatives to Move Seniors Forward," Public Policy and Aging Report, pp. 1–5, Staplin and Freund, Spring 2005.
- "Mobility and Older People," Generations, Journal of the American Society on Aging, pp. 68–69, Summer 2003.
- "Independent Transportation Network: The Next Best Thing to Driving," Generations, Journal of the American Society on Aging, pp. 70–71, Summer 2003.
- "Surviving Without Driving: Policy Options for Safe and Sustainable Transportation for Seniors," Transportation in an Aging Society: A Decade of Experience, Transportation Research Board, pp. 114–121, 2004.
- "Transportation on the Horizon," Mobility and Transportation in the Elderly, pp. 145–155. Schaie, Pietrucha, ed., Societal Impact on Aging, Springer Series, 2000.
- "Independent Transportation Network, Alternative Transportation for the Elderly," TR News, pp. 3 –12, Jan/Feb 2000.
- "Transportation Solutions on Horizon," Aging Today, p. 10, January/February 1998.
- "Build it and They Will Come," Transportation, pp. 12–15, September/October 1998.
- "How to Deal with Aging Drivers," Eye on Washington, Maine Sunday Telegram, p. 1, Section C, August 2, 1998.
