= Nancy Temkin =

American biostatistician

Nancy R. Temkin is an American statistician who works on the biostatistics of traumatic brain injury. She is a professor of neurological surgery and biostatistics at the University of Washington, and serves on the National Research Council Committee on Sports-Related Concussions in Youth.

Temkin earned bachelor's and master's degrees in mathematics and statistics, respectively, from the University of Connecticut in 1970 and 1971. She completed her PhD in 1976 from the University at Buffalo.

She is a fellow of the American Statistical Association and a recipient of the Distinguished Service Award of the American Epilepsy Society.
