= Greg D'Alba =

American businessman

- Born: Buffalo, New York, U.S.
- Education: State University of New York at Buffalo (BA)
- Occupation(s): President, Executive
- Years active: 1986–present

Greg D'Alba is the former President of CNN News Networks, and Turner Digital Ad Sales and Marketing. D'Alba oversaw all advertising sales, marketing strategies, and business operations for the CNN series of networks and Turner's digital news operations. Previously he served as CNN's executive vice president and chief operating officer. He subsequently served as division President at WME-IMG.

== Education and background ==
Growing up in Buffalo, New York, D'Alba went on to graduate from the State University of New York at Buffalo with a B.A. in communications in 1981. His colleague, Wolf Blitzer, is also an alumnus of Buffalo. Five years after graduating, D'Alba joined CNN as an account executive. His first television job was for WKBW-TV Channel 7 in Buffalo, New York.

== Career ==
Having started working for CNN in 1986, D'Alba worked with Ted Turner to change the public's perception of CNN to that of an innovative and technological news broadcaster. He has focused on working with advertisers and collaborating with them on their messages shown on the network. As executive vice president and COO, D'Alba established a campaign to redesign CNN's ad sales. D'Alba departed CNN in 2014 after 27 years, leaving for WME-IMG. D'Alba served as President of Global Sales & Marketing at WME-IMG through 2017. From 2017 he has run a media consultancy.

== Philanthropy and civic service ==
He is a board member of the Iraq and Afghanistan Veterans of America.
