= Journal of Human Capital =

- Discipline: Economics
- Language: English
- Edited by: Isaac Ehrlich

Publication details
- History: 2007-present
- Publisher: University of Chicago Press (United States)
- Frequency: Quarterly
- Impact factor: 0.939 (2017)

Standard abbreviations
- ISO 4: J. Hum. Cap.

Indexing
- ISSN: 1932-8575
- LCCN: 2006215062
- JSTOR: 19328575
- OCLC no.: 70862022

Links
- Journal homepage

The Journal of Human Capital is a quarterly peer-reviewed academic journal published by the University of Chicago Press. It covers theoretical and empirical research on the role of human capital in economics. The editor-in-chief is Isaac Ehrlich (State University of New York at Buffalo). The journal is abstracted and indexed in the Social Sciences Citation Index and Current Contents/Social & Behavioral Sciences.
