= Isaac Ehrlich =

American economist

- Born: 1938 (age 87–88)

Academic background
- Education: Hebrew University of Jerusalem (BA); Columbia University (PhD)

Academic work
- Discipline: Economics
- Institutions: State University of New York at Buffalo

Isaac Ehrlich (born 1938 in Israel) is an American economist. He has done research in the economics of crime and law enforcement and the economics of deterrence, including the death penalty and its deterrent effects. Ehrlich has served as the Chair of the Department of Economics at the State University of New York at Buffalo since 2000.

His papers on participation in illegitimate activities, corruption and economic growth, insurance and self-protection, the economics of health and longevity, and the death penalty are widely cited. He is widely regarded as an authority on the economics of crime and the death penalty, although his claims regarding the latter has been vigorously challenged. He is also one of the leading authorities on the economics of human capital and serves as the founding Editor-in-Chief of the Journal of Human Capital, published by the University of Chicago Press.

He is a SUNY and UB Distinguished Professor and holds the Melvin H. Baker Chair of American Enterprise at the University of Buffalo, SUNY. He holds a PhD from Columbia University and an Honorary Doctorate from the University of Orleans, France, which was awarded to him for his contributions to economic sciences. Ehrlich also served as a member of the US Presidential Health Policy Advisory group and the Transition Team on Health Policy for President Ronald Reagan, the Hong Kong Government's Health Services Research Committee headed by Secretary Elizabeth Wong, and the Council of Economic Advisors of New York State Governor David A. Paterson.
