= Karen Halbersleben =

Dr Karen Halberleban at the 2009 Northland commencement

Dr. Karen Halbersleben was the 11th president of Northland College in Ashland, Wisconsin, serving from 2002 to 2009. She succeeded Robert Rue Parsonage, who retired from the position in 2002, and became the first female president of the private university since its founding in 1892.

She is the author of a book titled Women's Participation in the British Antislavery Movement, 1824–1865.

Raised in Buffalo, New York, Halbersleben received her Ph.D. in history from the State University of New York at Buffalo before teaching at State University of New York at Oswego, where she was promoted to the administration before moving to Buena Vista University in Storm Lake, Iowa in 1998. She was serving as the vice president of academic affairs and dean of faculty at Buena Vista when she was selected as Northland's president. Halbersleben resigned her position in the spring of 2009.
