= Siemer House =

Historic house in Iowa, United States

- U.S. National Register of Historic Places
- U.S. Historic district – Contributing property

- Location within Iowa Location within the United States
- Location: 632 W. 3rd St. Davenport, Iowa
- Coordinates: 41°31′21″N 90°34′57″W
- Area: less than once acre
- Built: 1865
- Built by: J.C.F. Siemer
- Architectural style: Late Victorian
- Part of: West Third Street Historic District (Davenport, Iowa) (ID83003741)
- NRHP reference No.: 77000557
- Added to NRHP: November 16, 1977

The Siemer House was located on Lot 1, Block 17 of the original town of Davenport, Iowa, United States, which today is the west side of downtown. The property was listed on the National Register of Historic Places in 1977. In 1983 it was included as a contributing property in the West Third Street Historic District. The building deteriorated and it was torn down in 2007.

== History ==
J.C.F Siemer was a brick mason who immigrated to Davenport from the German states of Schleswig-Holstein. He arrived here in the 1850s, which was a period of significant Germann immigration. The house is attributed to him and was constructed in 1865. The building has had various owners and occupants over the years. In the latter part of its existence, it was divided into apartments and then became part of a used car lot.

== Architecture ==
The Siemer House was a two-story brick building on a stone foundation. This late Victorian structure featured details that evoked the Italianate style: a cube-like mass, a bracketed metal cornice, the tall, narrow profile of the fenestration, and the centralized entrance. The windows were symmetrically placed on the façade with five on the second floor and two flanking the entrance on both sides. The windows were surrounded by small wooden headers and sills. It was originally built as a single-story structure, with the date of the second story addition by the original builder and owner unknown. Another addition onto the rear of the house added a kitchen on the first floor and a porch on the second floor. There are several other examples of this type of house in the city, but they are all detached dwellings in residential areas while the Siemer House was in a more urban setting.
