= West Third Street Historic District (Davenport, Iowa) =

Historic district in Iowa, United States

- U.S. National Register of Historic Places
- U.S. Historic district
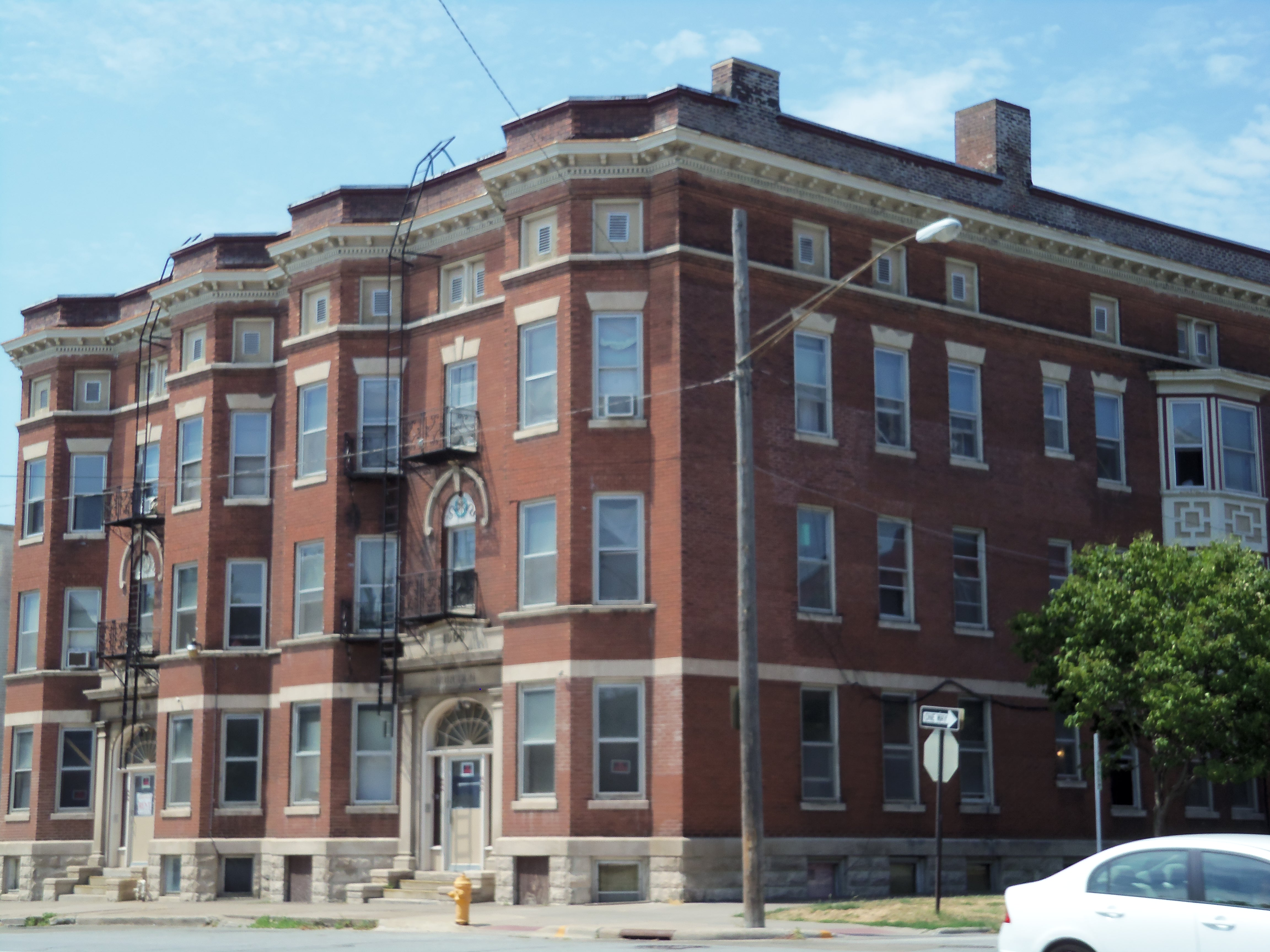
- Andresan Apartments

- Location within Iowa Location within the United States
- Location: Roughly bounded by 3rd Street between Ripley and Myrtle Streets, Davenport, Iowa
- Coordinates: 41°31′20″N 90°34′56″W
- Area: 21 acres (8.5 ha)
- Architect: Multiple
- Architectural style: Early Commercial
- MPS: Davenport MRA
- NRHP reference No.: 83003741
- Added to NRHP: November 18, 1983

West Third Street Historic District is located on the west side of downtown Davenport, Iowa, United States. It was listed on the National Register of Historic Places in 1983. The historic district connects the central business district with the working-class neighborhoods of the West End. Its historical significance is its connection to Davenport's German-American community. Germans were the largest ethnic group to settle in Davenport.

== History ==
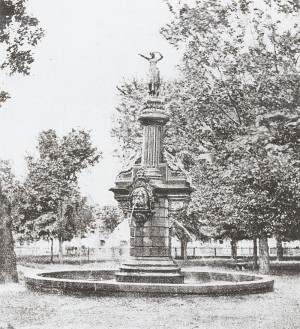
The fountain that stood in Washington Square with the Lady of Germania statue.

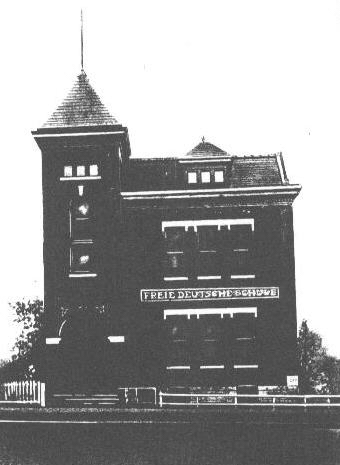
Freie Deutsche Schule

German immigrants started moving into the city in noticeable numbers starting in the late 1840s. In 1848 250 Germans came to Davenport and by 1850 that number rose to close to 3,000, or 20% of the city's population. German immigration remained strong through the 1880s. The Iowa census of 1890 showed that a quarter of Scott County residents were natives of Germany. A disproportionate number of those immigrants came from Schleswig-Holstein, which was in a border and personal rights dispute with Denmark in the 1840s. Other German immigrants to Davenport came from Bavaria, Hamburg, Hanover, and Mecklenburg.

Washington Square was a city block that was laid out by city founder Antoine LeClaire as part of the original town. By the 1850s it became the focus for the cultural life of many German immigrants who came to Davenport. The Germania Gasthaus, which housed many immigrants when they first came to the city, was just off the square on West Second Street. The Deutsch Theatre and the Central Turnverein, which no longer exist, faced the square on Third Street. The square itself, which sported a fountain topped with the statue of Lady of Germania, was the site of German beer gardens, outdoor music events, veterans’ celebrations and other community gatherings. Today the square is the downtown location of the YMCA, which was built in the 1960s. In 2006 a new gateway park at the foot of the Centennial Bridge was installed and it contains a statue of the Lady of Germania that was modeled on the one that once graced the square. The Lady of Germania is an ancient symbol that personified strength, unity and liberty. She was also a reminder to many people of their native Germany.

German “free thinkers” were part of the German immigration that came to Davenport. Their political and philosophical thinking tended to be anti-clerical and secular. This included their opposition to the establishment of parochial schools. Instead, they started the Freie Deutsche Schule near Washington Square in September 1852. The school remained in operation for 35 years and instructed children of the German families in their political stance of a separate German culture that emphasized secular concerns. Not all German immigrants were of this political bent and parochial schools were started at Trinity Lutheran Church and St. Kunigunda Catholic Church (later renamed St. Joseph).

Washington Square, and what is now the West Third Street Historic District, was lined with buildings that had small shops with residential space above. In some cases, the residential space housed the proprietor of the shop below. In other cases, the residential space was rented out by the shopkeeper for additional income. By and large, the buildings along West Third Street were built between the 1850s and 1900. It was a working-class neighborhood. Besides the shopkeepers, it was also home to residents who worked in the factories and mills along the Mississippi River. The German character of the area diminished as a result of anti-German sentiments that resulted from World War I. As the 20th century continued larger and more modern buildings were built closer to the central business district, and the areas further to the west started to decline.

== Architecture ==
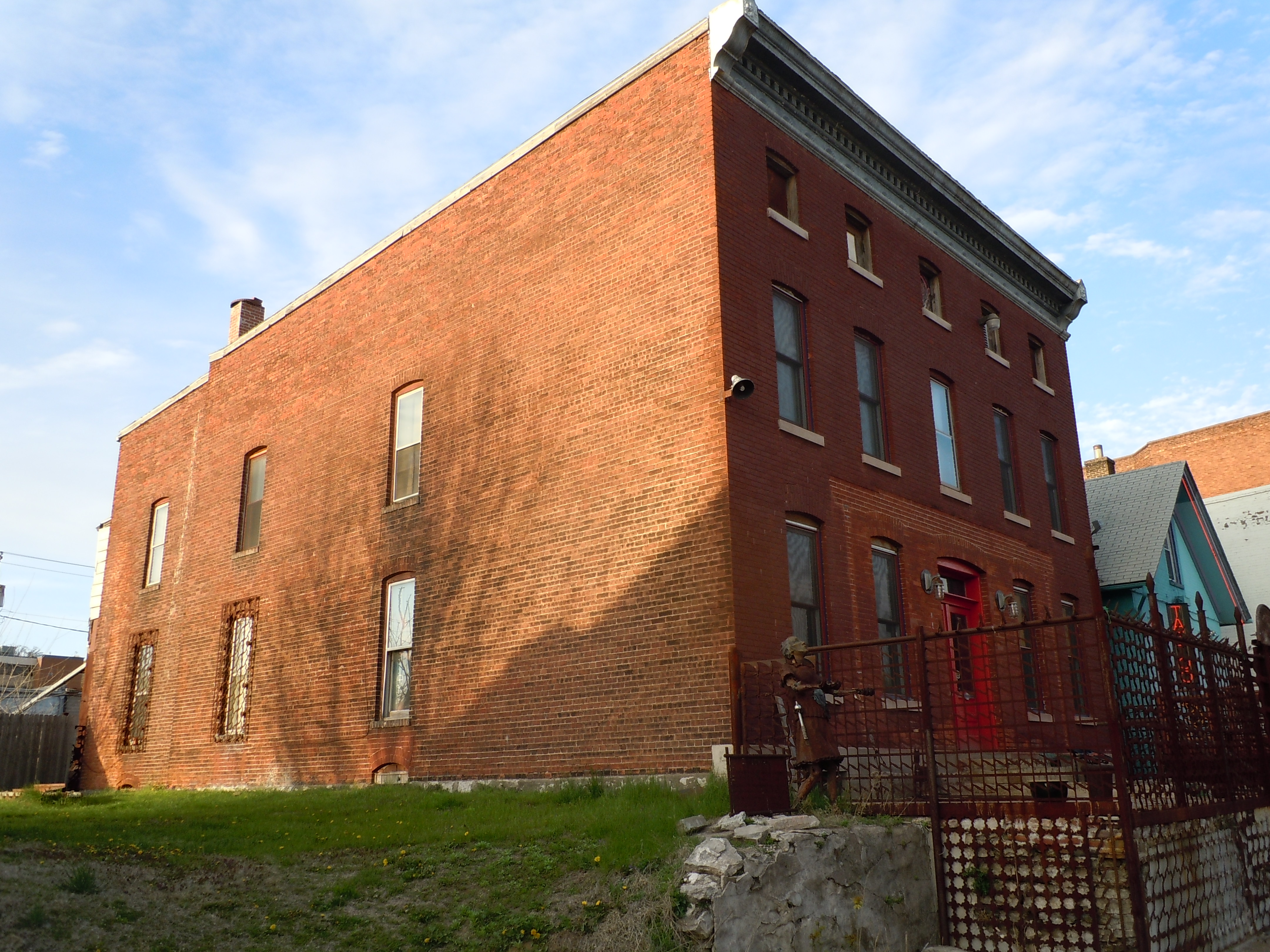
Building at 620 West Third Street

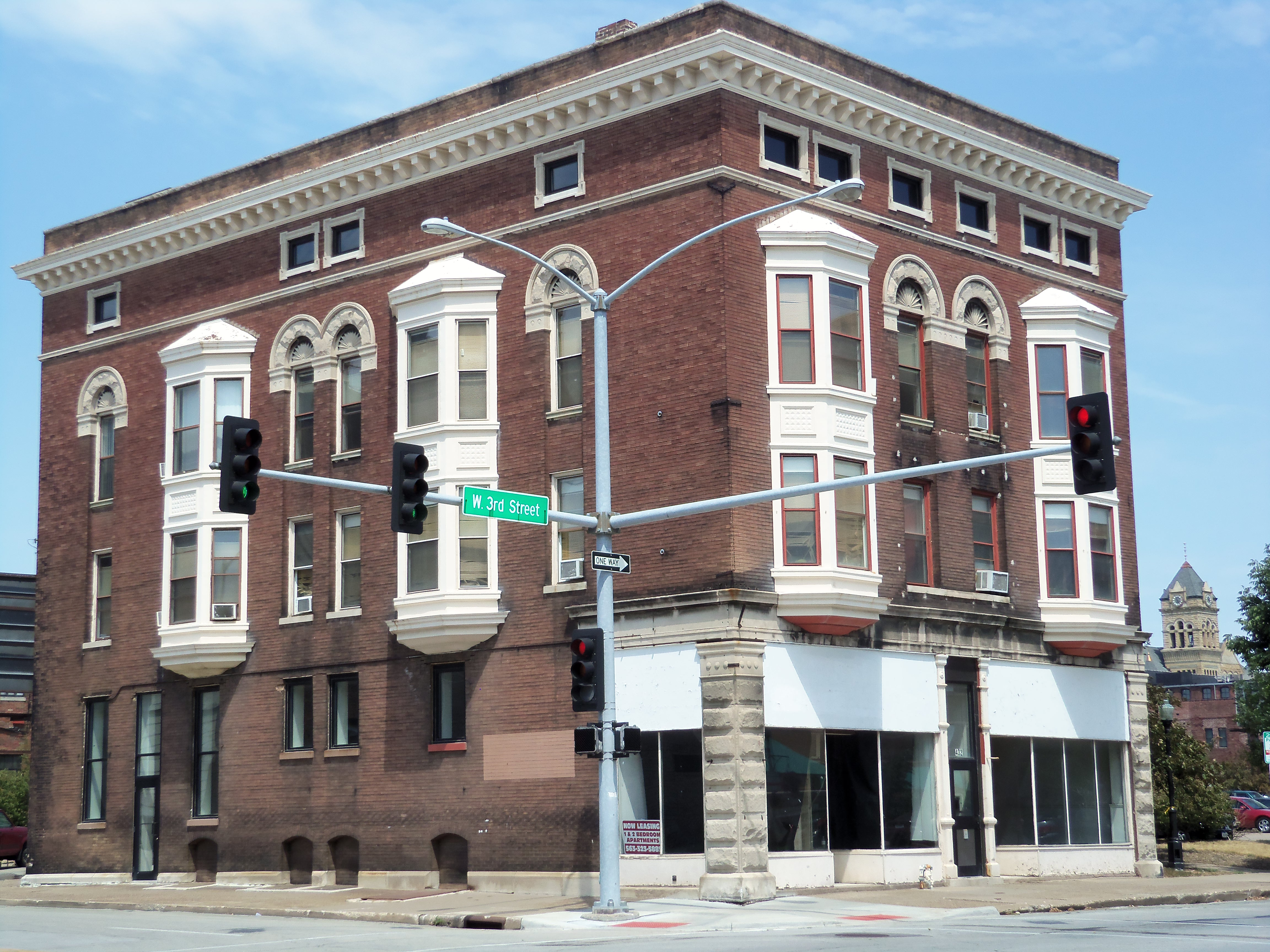
Ficke Building

The buildings in the West Third Street Historic District are made up of small commercial buildings, single-family dwellings, double houses, row houses, tenements, and apartment buildings. The combination of land use and different building types gives the district a unique character that is not found elsewhere in Davenport. The buildings, overall, are simple structures. Generally, they are one and two-story side-gabled structures that can be expanded saltbox fashion in the back, or they could be extended on one or both ends. For the most part, the houses are located on the west side of the district and the commercial buildings to the east. The buildings were largely built between the 1850s and the 1920s.

The older buildings in the district are side-gable structures designed in a vernacular Greek Revival style. These buildings serve a variety of functions including single-family houses, commercial buildings with apartments above, duplexes, and rowhouses. Several of the commercial buildings are also built in a vernacular Italianate style.

Toward the end of the 19th-century, larger buildings were built in and near the central business district. These buildings generally had more ornate storefronts and apartments above. Large brick apartment blocks were also built at this time. The commercial buildings were three to three and a half stories tall with cast iron storefronts and window bays on the upper floors. The side walls in between the buildings were opened up with recessed polygonal “wells” for the windows. The large apartment buildings are similar to those in other parts of the city. Many were built above high basements, had window bays and some had decorative doorways and cornices. Some of the buildings had a central entrance that led to a center stair hall. Others featured two entrances which led to flats on one side of a shared wall. The later arrangement featured mirror-image facades similar to the double houses.

== Contributing Properties ==
- Hiller Building
- Linden Flats
- Charles F. Ranzow and Sons Building
- Siemer House
