= Elad Levy =

American neurosurgeon

Elad I. Levy
- אלעד לוי
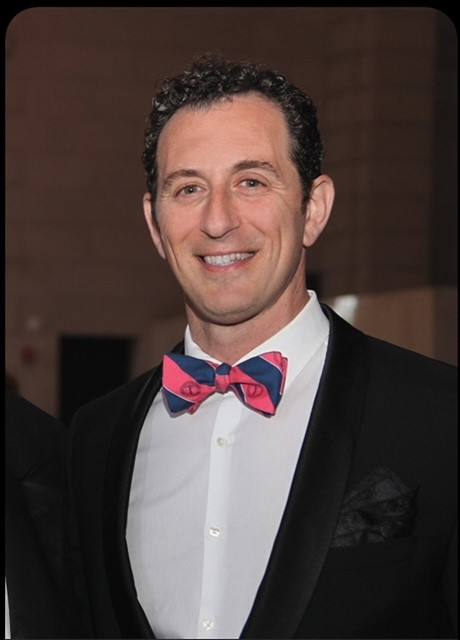
- Levy at Charity event
- Born: August 29, 1972 (age 54); Tiberias, Israel
- Citizenship: USA and Israel
- Education: Dartmouth College (1993), George Washington University School of Medicine(1997), UPMC (2004), Northeastern University (2013)
- Known for: Endovascular neurology, stroke intervention
- Scientific career
- Fields: Neurosurgery
- Workplaces: State University of New York at Buffalo
- Website: www.ubns.com

Elad I. Levy (Hebrew: אלעד לוי) is an American neurosurgeon who played a significant role in the establishment of thrombectomy as a standard of care, which improved quality of life and survival of stroke patients. He was one of the first to publish on stents for acute stroke, which were the precursors to stentreivers. He was also the first to publish on extending the time window and wake up strokes. He has focused his career and research on developing evidence based medicine and literature showing the benefits of thrombectomy for the treatment of stroke. He is Professor of Neurosurgery and Radiology, and the L. Nelson Hopkins, MD Professor Endowed Chair of the Department of Neurosurgery at the State University of New York at Buffalo (SUNY).

In 2011 Levy founded and is the president for the Program for Understanding Childhood Concussion & Stroke (PUCCS), which has raised over $750,000 which is aimed towards promoting research and preventing concussions in all sports. In addition Levy is co-chair of CycleNation for the American Heart Association raising over $500,000 geared towards prevention and education of stroke and heart disease. In 2013 he became the unaffiliated National Football League (NFL) Neurotrauma consultant for the Buffalo Bills. In 2017 he was appointed as one of 12 National Directors to the American Board of Neurological Surgeons. In 2018 he was appointed Secretary to the Congress of Neurological Surgeons Executive Committee and also appointed to the Ethics Committee for the American Association of Neurological Surgeons. Levy served as the president for the Congress of Neurological Surgeons annual scientific meeting in September 2023.

He is also the Director of Stroke Research and Director of Endovascular Stroke Treatment and Research at the Department of Neurosurgery, SUNY at Buffalo, co-director of Kaleida Health Stroke Center at the Gates Vascular Institute, and co-director of Cerebrovascular Surgery at the Department of Neurosurgery, SUNY at Buffalo. In 2020 Levy received his appointment as Distinguished Professor at the State University of New York at Buffalo due to his contributions to research, innovation, leadership and academia. In 2025 Levy was named Physician Leader and Medical Director of the Neuroscience service line at Kaleida Health. Levy also served as the neurosurgery consultant for season 2 and season 3 of TV show Grey's Anatomy.

== Early life and education ==
Levy was born in Tiberias, Israel in 1972 where he lived with his parents and grandparents. His father went to medical school in Italy, where Levy learned to speak Italian, in addition to English in school and Hebrew at home. At the age of seven, he immigrated to the United States. After his father's residency training in obstetrics and gynecology in New York City, his family settled in rural northern upstate New York close to Montreal, where his dad joined a solo Obstetrics and gynecology practice. Growing up, Levy spent his summers with his father's family in Israel. Levy attended local schools before his last two years of High School, which he spent at Choate Rosemary Hall, a private boarding school in Wallingford, Connecticut. In 2026 he was the recipient of their prestigious alumni award that recognizes alumni whose outstanding professional achievements have brought prestige to the school

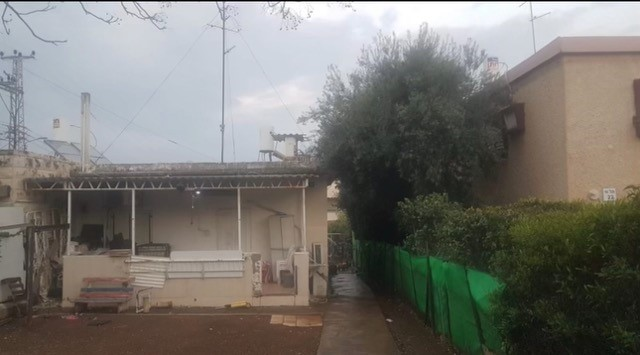
Levy House in Israel

== Higher education and training ==
Levy went to Dartmouth College to study molecular biology and biochemistry. He began medical school in 1993 at The George Washington University School of Medicine & Health Sciences in Washington, D.C., where he became interested in Orthopedic Surgery. However, when he did not secure the summer orthopedic internship after his freshman year, he chose to do a summer research project with Dr. Laligam Sekhar, the Chairman of Neurosurgery at George Washington University at the time, since then neurosurgery became his focus.

Following graduation in 1997, Levy began his surgical internships and training in neurosurgery at the University of Pittsburgh . Following in the footsteps of Dr. Peter Jannetta, the "father of microvascular decompression," and Dr. Dade Lunsford, who introduced Gamma-knife radiosurgery to the University of Pittsburgh, Levy pursued minimally invasive endovascular neurosurgery by spending 2 years of his residency in Buffalo, as a fellow under Dr. L. Nelson Hopkins, the "father of neurointerventional surgery". He completed his fellowship training in 2003 and returned to Pittsburgh to finish his residency training in 2004.

In later years, Levy also completed his Master of Business Administration at Northeastern University and graduated magna cum laude in 2013.

== Academic and professional career ==
Levy started his academic and professional career as an associate professor of neurosurgery and radiology at the State University of New York (SUNY) at Buffalo in 2004. The following year in 2005, he became the Director for Stroke Research, and co-director of Cerebrovascular Surgery at the Department of Neurosurgery, SUNY at Buffalo. He was also appointed as co-director of Kaleida Health Stroke Center and the Director of Endovascular Stroke Treatment and Research in 2006. He also served as the Endovascular Fellowship Program Director for the Department of Neurosurgery, SUNY at Buffalo from 2006 to 2013.

In 2010, Levy was promoted to the title of Professor of Neurosurgery and Radiology. Subsequently, in 2013 when Hopkins retired as the Chair of Neurosurgery, Levy became chairman. Since then he more than doubled the size of the faculty

From 2017 to 2023 Levy served as the director of the American Board of Neurological Surgeons and from 2022 to 2023 he served as the Vice Chair of the American Board of Neurological Surgeons Levy championed the pathway for ABNS board certification for exemplary internationally trained neurosurgeons.

In 2021 Levy helped pioneer the next generation of neuroendovascular care opening up the first Ambulatory Neurosurgery Center (ANSC) creating a paradigm shift in the treatment of vascular diseases of the brain. In 2024 he performed the first case of a complex aneurysm treatment in an awake patient in the ambulatory setting. Furthermore Levy was the first to publish on the feasibility, efficacy and generalizability of this treatment paradigm as the future of neurosurgical management. Under his leadership University at Buffalo Neurosurgery was the first and currently only department in the country to be approved to train residents and fellows in an ambulatory surgery center as an official site recognized by the RRC. In October 2025, Levy performed the first carotid artery stent deployment in an ambulatory surgery center as a live case at the Congress of Neurological Surgeons meeting. In 2026 Levy received the prestigious Stocton Kimball Award from the University at Buffalo recognizing his exceptional scientific achievements and service. In the same year Levy was the recipient of the Distinguished Service Award by the Congress of Neurological Surgeons. This Award recognizes the contributions and activities of outstanding individuals and members of the CNS for their pioneering work to the field of neurosurgery.

== Selected awards and recognitions ==
- 2026: Distinguished Service Award from the Congress of Neurological Surgeons
- 2026: Stockton Kimball Award
- 2026: Distinguished Alumni Award Recipient from Choate Rosemary Hall
- 2024: Dacey Medal for outstanding cerebrovascular research
- 2024: Duke Samson Award for the COMMAND Trial
- 2023: Elected into AOA Honor Medical Society
- 2022-2023: President of the Congress of Neurological Surgeons
- 2020: Distinguished Professor at State University of New York at Buffalo
- 2018: Awarded the Drake Lectureship at the Congress of Neurological Surgeons
- 2018 : "Teacher of the year Award" by Residents and Fellows at the University at Buffalo Neurosurgery for dedication to teaching and mentoring, given by the Department of Family Medicine, Jacobs School of Medicine and Biomedical Sciences
- 2016: Recipient of the L. Nelson Hopkins, MD Professor and Endowed Chair of Neurosurgery Award
- 2015: The George Washington University "Distinguished Alumni Achievement Award" for special recognition of professional accomplishments.
- 2014: State University of New York "Chancellor's Award" for Excellence in Scholarship and Creative Activities
- 2014: Recipient of the "2014 Hero of the Heart" Award for the American Heart Association in Western New York.

== Research ==
Levy has helped the endovascular treatment modalities for stroke. His research work focuses on neurovascular diseases such as stroke, brain aneurysms and vessel malformations. He has published and lectured on the endovascular techniques for cerebrovascular disorders, publishing over 900 peer-reviewed publications and more than 200 book chapters, including his latest book titled "Video Atlas of Acute Ischemic Stroke Intervention". He has also contributed several live cases for national and international meetings as well as for community education.

He was the US Interventional Principal Investigator for the SWIFT PRIME trials. Levy is the Principal investigator for the COMMAND trial and in 2023 he became the first surgeon to implant the stentrode, a novel stent in that is used for brain computer interface to help patients with limited mobility to operate technology such as mobile devices and computers using their thoughts helping these patients gain back independence. This study demonstrated that brain signals related to the motor intent can be consistently captured and transformed into digital motor outputs allowing the participants to successfully perform digital tasks. For his work on the COMMAND trial Levy was awarded the Duke Samson award at the Congress of Neurological Surgeons in 2024. Levy's research contributions are in the top two percentile among all academics in the neuroscience space and hold an H-index of 104.

== Selected publications ==
A partial list of articles is provided below:

- Thrombectomy 6 to 24 Hours after Stroke with Mismatch between Deficit and Infarct
- Safety and Efficacy of a 3-Dimensional Stent Retriever With Aspiration-Based Thrombectomy vs Aspiration-Based Thrombectomy Alone in Acute Ischemic Stroke Intervention: A Randomized Clinical Trial
- Results of the ANSWER Trial using the PulseRider for the Treatment of Broad-Necked, Bifurcation Aneurysms
- Long-Term Clinical and Angiographic Outcomes Following Pipeline Embolization Device Treatment of Complex Internal Carotid Artery Aneurysms: Five-Year Results of the Pipeline for Uncoilable or Failed Aneurysms Trial
- Endovascular Thrombectomy After Large-Vessel Ischaemic Stroke: A Meta-Analysis of Individual Patient Data from Five Randomised Trials
- Safety and Efficacy of Solitaire Stent Thrombectomy: Individual Patient Data Meta-analysis of Randomized Trials
- Stent-Retriever Thrombectomy after Intravenous t-PA vs. t-PA Alone in Stroke
- Aggressive Medical Treatment With or Without Stenting in High-risk Patients with Intracranial Artery Stenosis (SAMMPRIS): The Final Results of a Randomised Trial
- Pipeline for Uncoilable or Failed Aneurysms: Results from a Multicenter Clinical Trial
- Solitaire Flow Restoration Device versus the Merci Retriever in Acute Ischaemic Stroke (SWIFT): A Randomized, Parallel-Group, Non-Inferiority Trial
- Stenting versus Aggressive Medical Therapy for Intracranial Arterial Stenosis
- First Reported Series of Cerebral Angiography Performed at an Outpatient Center: Safety and Satisfaction Results
- Neurosurgical Training Requires Embracing Ambulatory Surgery Centers
- Cerebral angiography in outpatient endovascular centers: roadmap and lessons learned from interventional radiology, cardiology, and vascular surgery
- Recent Advances in Endovascular Neurosurgery: Pushing the Envelop

=== Selected academic books ===
Levy has published on neurovascular diseases including this three part series highlighting decision-making and providing video examples of complex neurovascular procedures and stroke intervention techniques

- Decision Making in Neurovascular Disease
- Video Atlas of Neuroendovascular Procedures
- Video Atlas of Acute Ischemic Stroke Intervention

Levy has also edited numerous books on neurovascular diseases outlined below

- Complications in Endovascular Surgery: Peri-procedural prevention and treatment
- Neuroendovascular Surgery
- Acute Stroke Management in the First 24 Hours: A Practical Guide for Clinicians
