= Victoria Siemer =

American graphic artist

Victoria Siemer (a.k.a. Witchoria) is a Brooklyn-based American graphic artist who focuses mainly on photo manipulation using Photoshop. She goes by the moniker "Witchoria" because "digital manipulation has given me the ability to create my own alternate realities where anything is possible. Sometimes it feels like magic."

== Education ==
Siemer graduated from SUNY Buffalo with a BFA in Communication Design.

== Works ==
Siemer's works include Geometric Reflections (digitally-altered landscapes) series, in which the artist "digitally overlays an existential or lovelorn computerized error message over a scanned Polaroid." Geometric Reflections features landscapes that have had their reflections manipulated and turned. In her Waves and Galaxies set, she manipulates mugs and teacups so that they hold the ocean or a galaxy. Illuminated features blunt and harsh quotes that come from her own mind sitting in various landscapes. Siemer's Wish You Were Here drops a pin in either an intimate or disastrous photograph while a search bar reads "wish you were here."

Siemer has also worked with Gucci, who featured her in their Instagram collaboration, #GucciGram.

== Awards ==
In December 2015, Siemer won a Best Visual Design Award at the New York Adobe Creative Jam.
