= Hayes Hall =

Hayes Hall may refer to:

- Edmund B. Hayes Hall, a building at the University at Buffalo on the National Register of Historic Places
- Hayes Hall, a building at the Ohio State University
- Hays Hall, a former residence hall at Washington & Jefferson College
