= Davis Hall =

Davis Hall may refer to:

- Davis Memorial Hall, a building at Washington & Jefferson College, in Washington, Pennsylvania, US
- Barbara and Jack Davis Hall, a building at University at Buffalo, Amherst, New York, US
