= Umland =

Umland is a surname. Notable people with the surname include:

- Andreas Umland (born 1967), German political scientist, historian, and interpreter
- Jeffrey Umland, American mechanical engineer
- Kristin Umland, American mathematician and mathematics educator
