= Eri Linsker =

American poet, educator, and psychotherapist

- Other name: Eric Linsker
- Education: Harvard University (BA); Iowa Writers' Workshop (MFA)
- Occupations: Poet, educator, psychotherapist
- Known for: Poetry, psychoanalytic psychotherapy
- Notable work: La Far
- Awards: Iowa Poetry Prize (2013); Roger Conant Hatch Prize for Lyric Poetry (2007)

Eri Linsker (also credited as Eric Linsker) is an American poet, educator, and psychotherapist based in New York City. Linsker is the author of La Far, which received the Iowa Poetry Prize in 2013.

== Early life and education ==
Linsker was raised in Millwood, New York and attended Horace Greeley High School in Chappaqua. As a senior, Linsker was among 30 students honored in a national poetry contest sponsored by the University at Buffalo College of Arts and Sciences in 2003.

Linsker earned a Bachelor of Arts from Harvard University. While an undergraduate, Linsker received the Roger Conant Hatch Prize for Lyric Poetry in 2007. Linsker later completed a Master of Fine Arts at the Iowa Writers' Workshop.

== Literary career ==
Linsker’s poetry has appeared in Boston Review, Chicago Review, and Conjunctions.

In 2013, the poetry collection La Far was selected as the winner of the Iowa Poetry Prize and published by the University of Iowa Press. In an essay published by the Poetry Society of America, Linsker discussed the poem “Rare Earths,” addressing ecological awareness in contemporary poetry.

Linsker was a contributor to The Arcadia Project: North American Postmodern Pastoral, a Poetry Project reading series and anthology featuring contemporary poets.

Linsker is a contributing editor at Parapraxis, where published work has addressed topics including neurodiversity and gender and sexuality studies.

== Psychotherapy practice ==
In addition to literary work, Linsker practices psychoanalytic psychotherapy. Linsker was quoted in a 2020 Slate article discussing the shift to remote psychotherapy during the COVID-19 pandemic.

== Teaching reassignment ==
In December 2014, Linsker was arrested during a protest on the Brooklyn Bridge and charged in connection with an altercation involving police officers.

At the time, Linsker was a part-time lecturer at CUNY Queens College. Following the arrest, the college reassigned Linsker from teaching duties to academic support functions pending the outcome of the case.
