= Satish K. Tripathi =

American computer scientist

Satish Tripathi

15th President of the University at Buffalo
- In office April 18, 2011 – August 10, 2026
- Preceded by: John B. Simpson
- Succeeded by: Caroline Genco

Personal details
- Born: January 20, 1951 (age 75) India
- Spouse: Kamlesh Tripathi
- Children: 2
- Education: Banaras Hindu University (BS, MS); University of Toronto (MS, PhD); University of Alberta (MS)
- Scientific career
- Education: University of Toronto
- Fields: Computer science
- Workplaces: University of Maryland, College Park; University of California, Riverside; University at Buffalo
- Thesis: On approximate solution techniques for queueing network models of computer systems (1979)
- Doctoral advisor: Kenneth Sevcik

Satish Kumar Tripathi is an Indian-American academic, computer scientist and academic administrator. From 2011 to 2026, he served as president of the University at Buffalo, the flagship of the State University of New York system, and was the university's first foreign-born president. Previously, he served as provost of University at Buffalo from 2004 to 2011. From 1997–2004, Tripathi served as dean of the Bourns College of Engineering at University of California, Riverside.

== Early life and education ==
Tripathi was raised in the village of Patna Mubarakpur in Uttar Pradesh, India, and graduated at the top of his class from Banaras Hindu University (BHU). He holds a doctorate in computer science from the University of Toronto, as well as three master's degrees—one in computer science from the University of Toronto and two in statistics from the University of Alberta and BHU.

== Career ==
Coming to the United States in 1978, Tripathi joined the faculty of the Department of Computer Science at the University of Maryland, where his 19-year tenure included serving as chair from 1988–1995. While on sabbatical at the University of Maryland, he also held visiting professorships at the University of Paris-Sud in France and the University of Erlangen-Nuremberg in Germany. From 1997–2004, Tripathi served as dean of the Bourns College of Engineering at the University of California-Riverside, where he nearly quadrupled the number of students and tripled the number of faculty at that institution and led its rise from an unranked program to a position in the upper half of the U.S. News and World Report Best Engineering Graduate Schools rankings.

Tripathi joined the University at Buffalo in 2004, serving as UB's provost and executive vice president for academic affairs until his appointment as president in 2011.

He oversaw the development of innovative "living-learning environments" constructed as part of "Building UB", the university's comprehensive physical plan.

Tripathi led a strategic planning process for UB's international programs that has led to significant expansion of the university's international presence and the continued globalization of its three Western New York campuses. He signed a memorandum of understanding in 2005 with Indian Prime Minister Manmohan Singh to establish the Indo-U.S. Inter-University Collaborative Initiative in Higher Education and Research, which has led to a significant partnership between UB and Amrita University. UB's educational programs in Singapore, in partnership with the Singapore Institute of Management, also have experienced significant enrollment growth under Tripathi’s leadership.

Tripathi was one of the principal creators of the UB 2020 long-range academic plan.

Within his first year as president, the university celebrated a number of major milestones, including the passage of the NYSUNY 2020 legislation that led to historic reforms for UB and the SUNY system of public higher education as a whole. Since Tripathi assumed the presidency in 2011, the university has also opened six major building projects on its three campuses—including the new $375 million building for the Jacobs School of Medicine and Biomedical Sciences on the Buffalo Niagara Medical Campus that is positioned as the hub of a thriving life sciences community in Buffalo—and celebrated a $40 million bequest from George Melvin Ellis, Jr, a UB graduate in 1945 that was the largest gift in university history at that time. The university also received designation of a New York State Center of Excellence in Materials Informatics.

Tripathi has published more than 200 scholarly papers, supervised more than 30 doctoral and postdoctoral students and served on program committees of numerous international conferences. The former editor of several top-tier scientific journals, he is a founding editorial board member of IEEE Pervasive Computing.

On September 16, 2025, Tripathi announced his plans to retire from the University at Buffalo presidency in July 2026. At the time, he said he would take on a faculty role in the University at Buffalo School of Engineering and Applied Sciences following a yearlong sabbatical. His successor, Caroline Genco, took office on August 10, 2026.

== Civic and professional involvement ==
A leader in the national higher education community, Tripathi is co-chair of the Association of American Universities (AAU) Task Force on Expanding U.S.-India University Partnerships. Tripathi served on the College Football Playoff Board of Managers and has served as chair of the Mid-American Conference Council of Presidents as well as on the boards of the NCAA Division I and NCAA Board of Governors. The former chair of Internet2, Tripathi currently serves as the president/chancellor representative. In addition, he has served on the boards of the Association of American Universities, the Association of Public and Land-Grant Universities, the Council for Higher Education Accreditation and as a member of the Reimagine NY Commission. In 2011, Tripathi was appointed the inaugural co-chair of the Western New York Regional Economic Development Council, a position he held until 2017. Further, Tripathi was elected to the American Academy of Arts and Sciences in 2024 and is also a fellow of the Institute of Electrical and Electronics Engineers (IEEE) for advancing the state of the art in computer and network systems analysis and for excellence in technical and educational leadership, as well as a fellow to the American Association for the Advancement of Science. He was also named a 2012 Great Immigrant Honoree by the Andrew Carnegie Foundation, recognizing naturalized citizens who are leaders across academia, the arts, business, medicine, sports, science, technology, engineering, and math.

== Awards ==
In 2006, Dr. Tripathi was awarded the honorary doctorate of sciences from the Indian Institute of Information Technology, Allahabad, and in 2016 he received an honorary doctorate of law from Brock University in Ontario, Canada, and he received an honorary doctorate in science from Maharaja Surajmal Brij University in 2024. He also has been honored with the 2009 Distinguished Alumnus Award from Banaras Hindu University. In 2026, Tripathi received the Samuel P. Capen Award from the UB Alumni Association.

== Personal life ==
Tripathi is a resident of Amherst, New York. He and his wife, Kamlesh, have two adult sons, Manish and Aashish, and three grandchildren, Ryan, Maya and Milo.

Academic offices
Preceded by John B. Simpson	15th President of the University at Buffalo; 2011–2026	Succeeded by Caroline Genco
