= University at Buffalo School of Engineering and Applied Sciences =

Engineering school

- Type: Public
- Established: 1946
- Parent institution: University at Buffalo
- Dean: Kemper Lewis
- Academic staff: 165
- Administrative staff: 300
- Students: 5,094
- Undergraduates: 3,167
- Postgraduates: 1,927
- Location: Amherst, New York
- Campus: Suburban
- Website: engineering.buffalo.edu

The University at Buffalo School of Engineering and Applied Sciences, or UB Engineering, is the largest public engineering school in the state of New York and is home to eight departments. Established in 1946, UB Engineering is ranked 59th by U.S. News & World Report and has an annual research expenditure of $72 million.

== Moving to Davis Hall ==
Since May 10, 2012 UB Engineering has officially moved to its new home, Davis Hall. The building, as a part of UB 2020 Strategic Plan, hosts Computer Science and Electrical Engineering departments.

== Department locations ==
- Bell Hall - Industrial and Systems Engineering, Mechanical and Aerospace Engineering
- Bonner Hall - Biomedical Engineering, Engineering Development and Alumni Relations, Undergraduate Education Offices
- Davis Hall - Computer Science and Engineering, Electrical Engineering, Dean's Office
- Furnas Hall - Chemical and Biological Engineering, Mechanical and Aerospace Engineering
- Jarvis Hall - Civil, Structural and Environmental Engineering (Environmental Engineering), Mechanical and Aerospace Engineering
- Ketter Hall - Civil, Structural and Environmental Engineering (Civil Engineering)

A new student-focused building, Agrusa Hall, broke ground on September 17th, 2024 and is currently under construction.

== Departments ==
The school includes eight departments offering undergraduate, graduate and professional degrees in following disciplines:

- Biomedical Engineering (BME)
- Chemical and Biological Engineering (CBE)
- Civil, Structural and Environmental Engineering (CSEE)
- Computer Science and Engineering (CSE)
- Electrical Engineering (EE)
- Industrial and Systems Engineering (ISE)
- Materials Science and Engineering (MSE)
- Mechanical and Aerospace Engineering (MAE)
- Computational Data Science and Engineering (CDSE)

== Main research areas ==
UB Engineering has six schoolwide Research Areas as follow:

- Bioactivities
- Infrastructure and Environment
- Photonics, Microelectronics and Materials
- Information Technology and Computing
- Energy, Flows and Materials Processing
- Virtualization, Simulation and Modelling

== Research Centers and Labs ==
- Center for Biomedical Engineering (CBE)
- Center of Excellence for Document Analysis and Recognition (CEDAR)
- Center for Excellence in Global Enterprise Management (GEM)
- Center of Hybrid Nanodevices and Systems (CoHNS)
- Center for Hybrid Rocket Exascale Simulation Technology (CHREST)
- Center for Unified Biometrics and Sensors (CUBS)
- Center of Excellence in Information Systems Assurance Research and Education (CEISARE)
- Center for Integrated Waste Management (CIWM)
- Center for Multisource Information Fusion (CMIF)
- New York State Center of Excellence in Materials Informatics (NYSCEMI)
- Energy Systems Institute (ESI)
- Great Lakes Program (GLP)
- MCEER: Earthquake Engineering to Extreme Events (MCEER)
- New York State Center for Engineering Design and Industrial Innovation (NYSCEDII)
- Research Institute for Safety and Security in Transportation (RISST)
- The Center for Industrial Effectiveness (TCIE)
- Structural Engineering and Earthquake Simulation Laboratory (SEESL)
- Center for Computational Research (CCR)
- Institute for Lasers, Photonics and Biophotonics (Photonics)
- Center for Spin Effects and Quantum Information in Nanostructures (CSEQuIN)
- Buffalo Center for Biomedical Computing (BCBC)
- Center for Cognitive Sciences (COGSCI)
- Research Institute for Safety and Security in Transportation (RISST)
- CUBRC (member of the Alliance for Biosecurity, a group of biopharmaceutical companies and universities that promote the development of medical countermeasures for bioterrorist attacks or infectious disease pandemics)
- Center for Excellence in Home Health and Well-Being through Adaptive Smart Environment (Home BASE)
- Institute for Sustainable Transportation and Logistics (ISTL)
- Institute for Bridge Engineering (IBE)

== Deans ==
Dean	Tenure	Alma mater	Specialty
Harvey G. Stenger Jr.	2006–2011	Massachusetts Institute of Technology	Chemical Engineering
Rajan Batta	2011–2013	Massachusetts Institute of Technology	Operations Research
Liesl Folks	2013–2019	University of Western Australia	Physics(Nanotechnology, Magnetism)
Rajan Batta	2019–2020	Massachusetts Institute of Technology	Operations Research
Kemper E. Lewis	2020–present	Georgia Institute of Technology	Engineering Design and Optimization

== Alumni ==
As of 2016, the school of engineering and applied sciences has 30,000+ alumni in 50 states and 70 countries.

=== Notable alumni ===
- Norman McCombs, Bachelors in Mechanical Engineering, won National Medal of Technology for his portable oxygen source inventions and refinements
- Erich Bloch, Director of the National Science Foundation from 1984 to 1990 and recipient of the National Medal of Technology and Innovation
- Wilson Greatbach, Recipient of the Lemelson–MIT Prize and National Medal of Technology and Innovation in 1990
- Gregory Jarvis, NASA Astronaut and American engineer who died during the destruction of the Space Shuttle Challenger on mission STS-51-L
- Robin Yanhong Li, billionaire and founder of Baidu, the largest search engine in China.
- Christopher Scolese, director of the NASA Goddard Space Flight Center
- Ira Flatow, Emmy Award winner and host of National Public Radio's popular, Science Friday
- Shenthuran Maheswaran, Global Peace Ambassador for Sri Lanka at Global Peace Index
- Jeffrey Umland, PhD in Mechanical Engineering, is the chief mechanical engineer for the Curiosity Rover, NASA's Mars Science laboratory project.
