= Jeffrey Umland =

Jeffrey Umland is the Chief Mechanical Engineer of NASA's InSight mission. He previously served as the Chief Mechanical Engineer of the Curiosity Rover at NASA's Mars Science Laboratory.

== Background ==
Umland received his B.S. and Ph.D in mechanical engineering from the State University of New York at Buffalo in the School of Engineering and Applied Sciences in 1985 and 1991, respectively. In April 2014, he received the University's Clifford C. Furnas Memorial Award for achievement and distinction in science and engineering.

== Mission achievements ==
As the Chief Mechanical Engineer for the Curiosity MSL mission, Umland and his team were able to successfully land the rover on the surface of Mars on August 5, 2012. He led the project's mechanical engineering technical development during the mission. Umland also lead his team to invent the rover's "Sky-crane".

Erstwhile, Umland was the Jet Propulsion Laboratory's structural dynamics lead for the Shuttle Radar Topography Mission (SRTM), which flew on STS-99.

Currently, Umland is the Chief Mechanical Engineer for NASA's InSight mission, which is expected to launch in March 2016 and land on Mars in September 2016.
