= Liesl Folks =

Australian-American engineer

- Citizenship: Australian
- Education: University of Western Australia
- Scientific career
- Fields: Atomic force microscopy
- Workplaces: The University of Queensland
- Thesis: Measurement and Analysis of Time Dependent Effects in Ferromagnetic Materials (1994)
- Website: https://www.eait.uq.edu.au/profile/12173/liesl-folks

Liesl Folks is an Australian scientist and has conducted research related to atomic force characterization of magnetic materials which could potentially be used for quantum computing. Folks is currently serving as the Executive Dean and Faculty of Engineering, Architecture and Information Technology at the University of Queensland in Australia. She formerly held positions as the provost at the University of Arizona from 2019 to 2023, Vice President for Semiconductor Strategy, Director of the Center for Semiconductor Manufacturing, and Professor of Electrical and Computer Engineering.

== Early life and education ==
Folks, a native of Australia, holds a BSc (Hons) and a PhD, both in physics, from the University of Western Australia, as well as an MBA from Cornell University. Her PhD thesis investigated the characterization of ferromagnetic materials by Atomic Force Microscopy (AFM). Folks completed a postdoctoral fellowship at the University of Western Australia in the AFM characterization of nanoscale permanent magnetic materials.

== Research and career ==
After serving as a researcher from 1998 to 2013 at IBM and Hitachi, in 2013 after receiving an MBA from Cornell University, Folks was appointed Dean of the School of Engineering and Applied Sciences at the University at Buffalo. That year she was also appointed in the voluntary role of President of the Institute of Electrical and Electronics Engineers Magnetics Society, a professional society. At the University at Buffalo, she was committed to building educational programs that align with students’ and society’s needs.

She served as Dean of Engineering when two new departments were launched at the University of Buffalo; materials design (a joint initiative at UB between to the School of Engineering & Applied Sciences and the College of Arts and Sciences) and engineering education.

In 2019, she joined the University of Arizona as a professor of electrical and computer engineering, where she was also appointed senior vice president for academic affairs and provost. She resigned as provost in 2023, following the death of a professor on campus.

Folks is a co-inventor on 12 U.S. patents and is a co-author on approximately 60 peer-reviewed articles that have attracted more than 13,300 citations, and reviewed candidate theses for the award of Doctor of Philosophy. She is a Fellow of the National Academy of Inventors. In 2024, Folks received a Distinguished Service Award from the IEEE Magnetics Society. Folks was elected a fellow of the American Association for the Advancement of Science in March 2025.
