= The Spectrum (University at Buffalo) =

Newspaper in Buffalo, New York

- Type: Student newspaper
- School: University at Buffalo
- Owner(s): The Spectrum Student Periodical, Incorporated
- Editor-in-chief: Mylien Lai
- Founded: 1950
- Headquarters: Buffalo, New York, U.S.
- Circulation: 3,000
- Price: Free
- Website: www.ubspectrum.com

The Spectrum is a student newspaper published in Buffalo, New York. It is a digital newspaper published weekly at the University at Buffalo. The Spectrum is financially independent and supports itself with online advertising. Any undergraduate at the school is eligible to register for the newspaper and its corresponding English courses, regardless of intended major.

Students who choose to write for the paper are trained in Associated Press-style writing, editing and newspaper layout. Additionally, all writers and editors are trained in journalism ethics.

== History ==
The Spectrum began publishing in 1950 and has since become the largest student-run newspaper in the SUNY state school system. The paper is located at 132 Student Union at the University at Buffalo. When the newspaper was printed, it used an off-site press but was distributed to multiple areas on the university's North and South campuses. New editions are distributed every Thursday during the fall and spring school semesters. Each issue prints 3,000 copies that are read by approximately 21,000 people. The paper employs over 50 UB students, as well as members of the Western New York community.

In September 2023, The Spectrum announced it would cease print and become an online-only publication due to costs. Previously, about 3,000 copies were printed weekly during each semester, which cost the newspaper about $600 to $800 a week. The first all-digital edition was emailed in its new newsletter format on Sept. 8 with more than 500 subscribers.

== Faculty ==
The Spectrum is advised by Bruce Andriatch of The Buffalo News, who is an adjunct instructor though the English department. Jody Biehl, the former director of the school's Journalism Certificate Program, was the paper's advisor from 2009–2021.

Editors in Chief:

- 2026–2027: Mylien Lai
- 2025–2026: Izabella Ducato
- 2024–2025: Ricardo Castillo
- 2023–2024: Grant Ashley
- 2022–2023: Anthony DeCicco
- 2021–2022: Reilly Mullen
- 2020: Alexandra Moyen
- 2019–2020: Brenton Blanchet
- 2017–2019: Hannah Stein
- 2016–2017: Gabriela Julia
- 2015–2016: Tom Dinki
- 2014–2015: Sara DiNatale
- 2012–2014: Aaron Mansfield
- 2011–2012: Matt Parrino
- 2010–2011: Andrew Wiktor
- 2009–2010: Stephen Marth
- 2008–2009: Stephanie Sciandra
- 2007–2008: Silas Rader
- 2006–2007: Robert Pape
- 2005–2006: Jeremy G. Burton
- 2004–2005: George Zornick
- 2003–2004: Erin Shultz
- 2002–2003: Sara Paulson
- 1997–1999: Josh Walker
- 1996–1997: Steve Watson
- 1995–1996: Bonnie Butkus
- 1994–1995: Hakeem Oseni
- 1993–1994: Joe Sbarra
- 1992–1993: Keith McShea
- 1991–1992: Tracey Rosenthal
- 1990–1991: Ian Aronson
- 1989–1990: Bill Sheridan
- 1988–1989: Gerry Weiss
- 1987–1988: Ken Lovett
- 1986–1987: Brad Pick
- 1976–1977: Richard Korman
- 1975–1976: Amy Dunkin
- 1974–1975: Larry Kraftowitz
- 1972–1973: Jo-Ann Armao
- 1969–1970: James Brennan
- 1968–1969: Linda Hanley
- 1968: Barry Holtzclaw
- 1967–1968: Michael D'Amico
- 1965–1966: Jeremy Taylor
- 1964–1965: John Kowal
- 1964: Martin Kriegel
- 1963–1964: Arnold Mazur
- 1962–1963: Joan Flory
- 1961–1962: Howard Flaster
- 1961: Paul Speyser III
- 1961: Edward Brandt
- 1960–1961: Jack Freedman
- 1959–1960: Jack Grizzard
- 1958–1959: Jan Riley
- 1957–1958: Tom Dorsey
- 1956–1957: Jan Nitsch
- 1955–1956: Jack Penhollow
- 1955: Fred Fisher
- 1955: Jim Riley
- 1954–1955: Jim Engelhardt
- 1952–1953: Dick Schaller
- 1952: Paul Becker
- 1952: Paul Wehrum (acting)
- 1951: Chuck Partridge
- 1950–1951: Jack Keller

== Notable alumni ==
- Howard Kurtz, author and journalist (CNN, The Daily Beast)
- Jay Rosen, media critic, writer, and journalism professor at New York University
- Tom Toles, cartoonist (The Washington Post)

== Awards ==
- 2022 Society of Professional Journalists Region 1 Mark of Excellence, Breaking News Reporting: "East Side community members mourn victims of racially motivated mass shooting," by Grant Ashley, Moaz Elazzazi, Kyle Nguyen and Kayla Estrada
- 2022 Society of Professional Journalists Region 1 Mark of Excellence, In-Depth Reporting (Large): "Buffalo-based housing project fails to open on time, displaces UB students for nearly a semester," by Kyle Nguyen
- 2020 Society of Professional Journalists Region 1 Mark of Excellence, Sports Column Writing: Anthony DeCicco
- 2019 College Media Association Pinnacle Award, Best Breaking News Story: "UB to replace Sub-Board I with Faculty Student Association as student government fiscal agent," by Tanveen Vohra and Jacklyn Walters
- 2017 Society of Professional Journalists Region 1 Mark of Excellence, Breaking News Reporting: "Blindsided: Athletes, coaches and parents angered by UB’s decision to cut teams," by Michael Akelson
- 2015 College Media Association Pinnacle Award, Best Special Section: "The Sex Issue"
- 2014 College Media Association National College Media Leader of the Year: Aaron Mansfield
- 2014 College Media Association Pinnacle Award, Best Collegiate Sports Columnist: Aaron Mansfield
- 2013 Society of Professional Journalists National Mark of Excellence, In-Depth Reporting (Large): “The Heights of Fear,” by Lisa Khoury
- 2013 Society of Professional Journalists Region 1 Mark of Excellence, Sports Column Writing: Aaron Mansfield
- 2013 Society of Professional Journalists Region 1 Mark of Excellence, General News Reporting: Sam Fernando and Aaron Mansfield
- 2013 Associated Collegiate Press Pacemaker, Sports Story of the Year: "Lee, and they will follow," by Aaron Mansfield
- 2012 Society of Professional Journalists Second place, Mark of Excellence, Sports Column Writing: Aaron Mansfield
- 2012 Associated Collegiate Press Pacemaker, Sports Story of the Year: "The X-Files," by Matt Parrino
- 2012 College Media Association Runner-up, Best Student Media Leader: Matt Parrino
- 2006 Columbia Scholastic Press Association Gold Circle/Collegiate Circle Award for Entertainment Reviews: "Reggae with Chutzpah," by Alexander Nasarewsky
- 1972 Robert F. Kennedy Journalism Award Honorable Mention College: "Health Care Crisis," by Al Benson
