= Caroline Genco =

American microbiologist and academic administrator

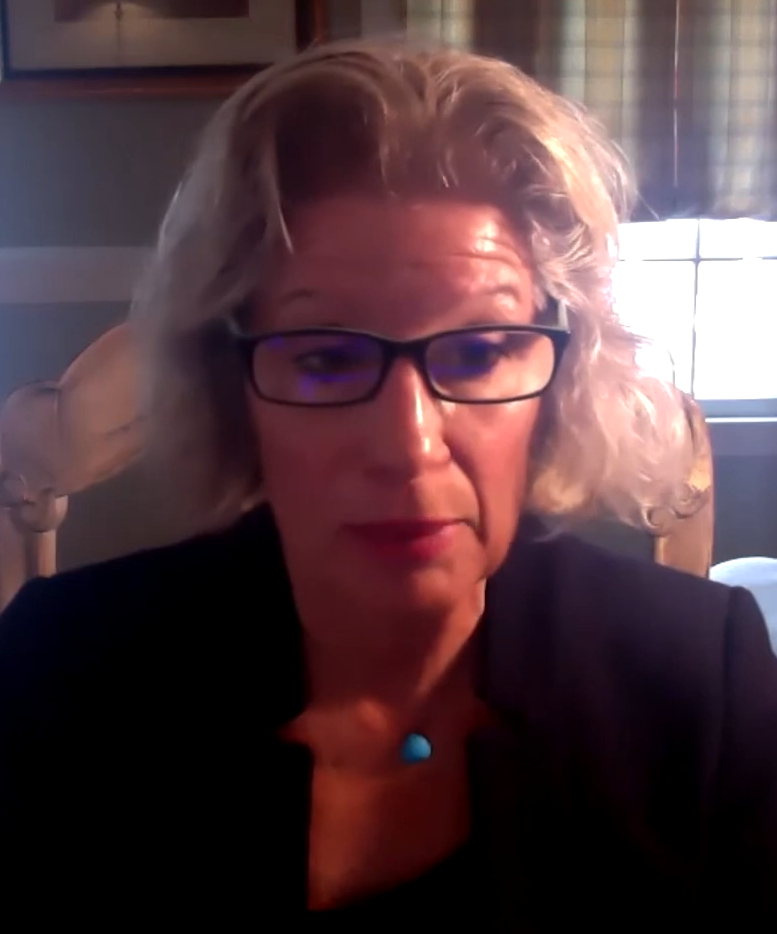
- Genco in 2021

16th President of the State University of New York at Buffalo
- Incumbent
- Assumed office August 10, 2026
- Preceded by: Satish K. Tripathi

Personal details
- Born: Caroline Attardo
- Education: State University of New York at Fredonia; University of Rochester
- Scientific career
- Fields: Microbiology, immunology
- Workplaces: Emory University; Morehouse School of Medicine; Boston University School of Medicine; Tufts University School of Medicine
- Thesis: Transfer of antibiotic resistance in Gram- negative bacteria (1987)

Caroline R. Attardo Genco is an American microbiologist and academic administrator serving as the 16th president of the University at Buffalo since 2026. She was previously the Arthur E. Spiller Professor in Genetics at Tufts University School of Medicine and provost of Tufts University.

== Life and career ==
Genco was born to Rita Galletti and Charles Attardo. She graduated from Mount Saint Mary Academy. She was the first member of her family to attend college, completing a B.S. in biology at State University of New York at Fredonia in 1981, and then a M.S. in microbiology from the University of Rochester in 1984.

Glenco received her Ph.D., also at the University of Rochester, in 1987, studying Neisseria gonorrhoeae antibiotic resistance. She completed postdoctoral research at the Centers for Disease Control and Prevention.

== Career and research ==
In 1989, she was appointed to an assistant professor position at Emory University, before joining the faculty of Morehouse School of Medicine as an associate professor in 1991. From 1997 to 2015, Genco served as Professor of Medicine at the Boston University School of Medicine, where she researched the link between oral bacteria and heart diseases.

In 2015, Genco joined the Tufts University School of Medicine as the Arthur E. Spiller Professor in Genetics and chair of the Department of Immunology. In 2019, she became vice provost for research. She succeeded Nadine Aubry as provost and senior vice president ad interim of Tufts University on January 1, 2022, and was appointed to those positions on a permanent basis on August 1, 2023.

At Tufts, Genco's laboratory researched how the microbiome and innate immune system influence inflammatory diseases. One specific research area of the lab is how mucosal pathogens work to evade macrophages/monocytes and the innate immune response in general. Genco's lab has recently progressed this work from in vitro human tissue culture to in vivo mouse models, and now human cohorts. Another research focus of Genco's group was how Neisseria bacteria regulate gene transcription, with a focus on how environmental factors influence these pathways. Specifically, the lab has uncovered some of the mechanisms by which Fur (ferric uptake regulator), a regulatory protein, affects the virulence of bacteria.

Genco maintains a particular interest in antibiotic resistance and immune response to Neisseria gonorrhoeae, and especially how these differ in male and female human hosts. Genco's laboratory was one of the first to examine gonorrhea in female patients, and how their typically asymptomatic infections differed from males' typically symptomatic ones. In 2023, Genco co-chaired the 23rd annual International Pathogenic Neisseria Conference (IPNC).

On June 2, 2026, the State University of New York Board of Trustees named Genco as the 16th president of the University at Buffalo, succeeding Satish Tripathi. She took office on August 10, 2026.
