= Nadine Aubry =

American engineer

9th Provost of Tufts University
- In office July 1, 2019 – December 31, 2021
- Preceded by: David Harris
- Succeeded by: Caroline Genco

Personal details
- Education: Cornell University

Nadine Aubry is an American engineer born in France. She holds dual citizenship between both the United States and France. She previously served as Provost and Senior Vice President of Tufts University. She is an elected Fellow of the American Association for the Advancement of Science, the American Society of Mechanical Engineers, the American Physical Society, the American Institute of Aeronautics and Astronautics, the National Academy of Inventors, and the American Academy of Arts and Sciences.

Before working at Tufts University as Provost and senior vice president (2019-2021), Nadine worked at Northeastern University as head of the department of mechanical engineering (2012-2019). There she helped implement the Edward G. Galante Engineering Business Program. This program Aimed to allow engineering students the ability to get a multi-degree in business to aid in their future careers. Nadine was also a professor at Carnegie Mellon University and was elected head of the engineering department there. Additionally she was elected Raymond J. Lane Distinguished Professor at Carnegie Mellon University in 2009.

Nadine is also an elected member of the National Academy of Engineering (2011) for contributions to low-dimensional models of turbulence and microfluidic devices, and for leadership in engineering education. She was elected an International Fellow of the Royal Academy of Engineering in 2023.

Through her work in microfluidics she was elected fellow of the American Association for the Advancement of Science. She earned this title through her work on multiple projects with microfluidics throughout her career. Some of these breakthroughs may lead to advances in medicine, such as enhancements in drug-delivery patch technology.
