= University at Buffalo College of Arts and Sciences =

- Established: 1915
- Location: Buffalo, NY, U.S.

The University at Buffalo College of Arts and Sciences at the University at Buffalo was founded in 1915 and is the largest and most comprehensive academic unit at the university with 31 degree-granting departments, 16 academic programs, and 21 centers and institutes across the humanities, arts, and sciences.

Comprising 31 departments in the arts, humanities, social sciences, natural sciences, and mathematics, as well as 15 special programs and 23 centers and institutes, the College is the largest campus unit at the University at Buffalo. The College of Arts and Sciences has more than 450 faculty members, including 27 SUNY Distinguished Professors. Jeffrey T. Grabill is the Dean of the College of Arts and Sciences.
