= Barbara and Jack Davis Hall =

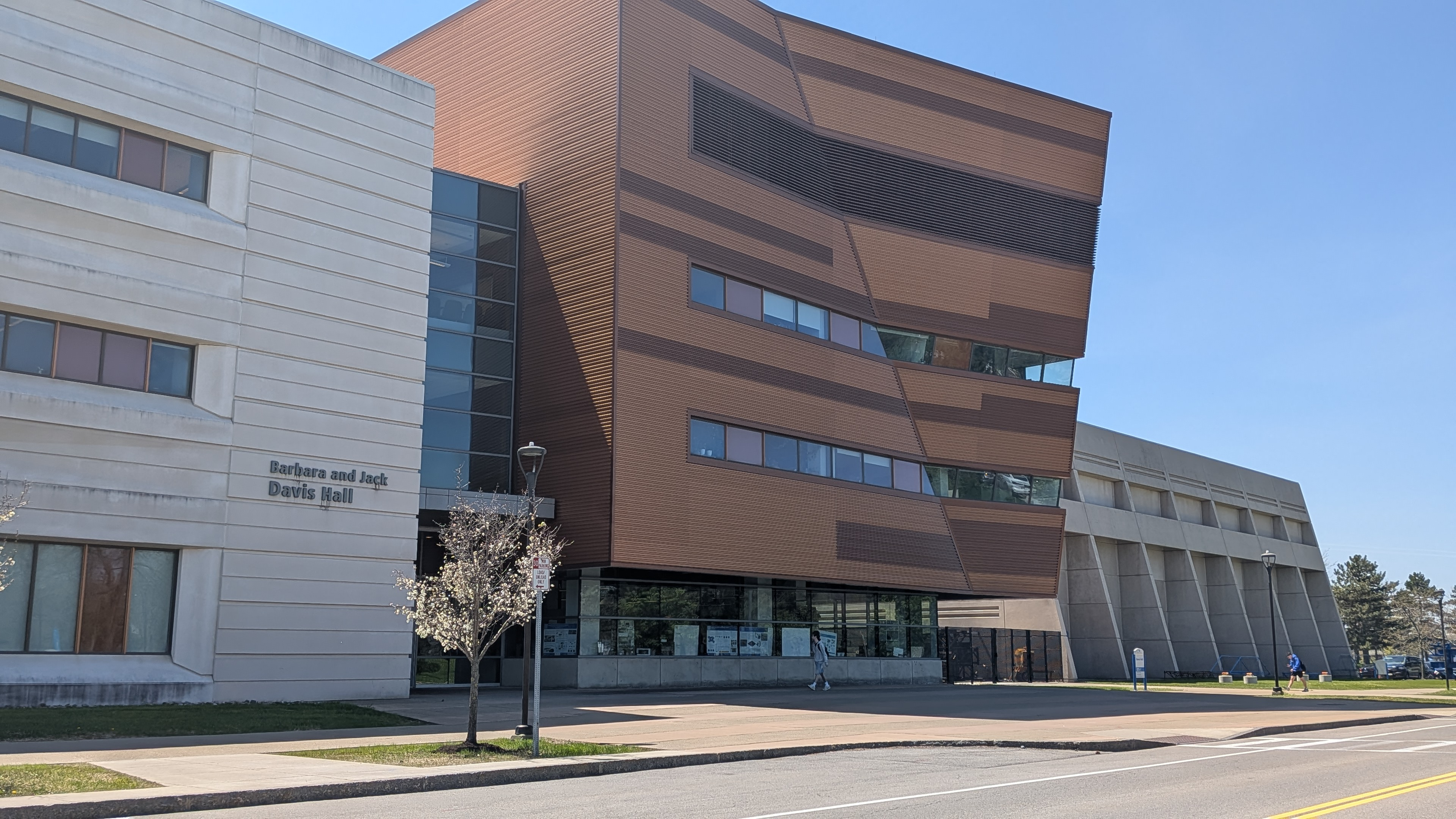
- The exterior to Barbara and Jack Davis Hall in 2026
- Interactive map of the Barbara and Jack Davis Hall area

General information
- Type: Educational, Research Center
- Location: North Campus, Amherst, New York
- Coordinates: 43.002795°N 78.787145°W
- Current tenants: UB Engineering; Department of Computer Science and Engineering; Department of Electrical Engineering; Center of Excellence for Document Analysis and Recognition (CEDAR); Center for Unified Biometrics and Sensors(CUBS)
- Groundbreaking: May 2009
- Completed: Late 2011
- Opened: May 10, 2012
- Cost: $75 million (2010 dollars)
- Client: State University of New York
- Owner: University at Buffalo

Technical details
- Floor count: 3, plus penthouse
- Floor area: 130,000 sq ft (12,000 m^{2})

Design and construction
- Architect: Robert Goodwin
- Architecture firm: Perkins and Will
- Main contractor: Turner Construction
- Awards: LEED Gold Certificate

Website
- Davis Hall

Officially opened on May 10, 2012, as a part of University at Buffalo's 2020 Strategic Plan, construction of Barbara and Jack Davis Hall, known as Davis Hall, started in 2009 with ground-breaking and finished in late 2011 with a construction cost of $75 million including nearly $49.6 million from New York State funding and the rest from corporate and individual endowments. Besides UB Engineering, Davis Hall is the new host to both Computer Science and Electrical Engineering departments featuring several new laboratories and research centers.

The building is constructed by Turner Construction and its exterior design is a reminiscent to printed circuit board representing interaction among faculties and students and is designed by Perkins and Will firm. The building is constructed in accordance with LEED's Gold certificate standards.

== Naming ==
The building is named after industrialist-turned-political candidate Jack Davis and his wife Barbara, who made the largest endowment ($5 million) among individuals to fund the project. The couple made their first donation of $1.5 million to fund the project in 2008. Jack, a UB Engineering graduate in 1955, and his wife donated an additional $3.5 million to the project making themselves the people who have made the largest endowment in university's history with $5 million endowment.

== Tenants ==
=== Departments ===
The building is the new home to Computer Science and Electrical Engineering departments. However, the building supports five other departments such as Mechanical and Aerospace Engineering, Biomedical Engineering, Civil, Structural and Environmental Engineering, Industrial and Systems Engineering and Chemical and Biological Engineering.

== Notable features ==
=== Facilities and research centers ===
- 5,000 sq ft (460 m^{2}) of Cleanroom space
- Two 3D Electrical Engineering Labs
- A smart room
- A surgery lab
- A multimedia lab
- A security lab
- Two visualization labs
- Eleven flexible, multi-purpose labs
- Center of Excellence for Document Analysis and Recognition (CEDAR)
- Center for Unified Biometrics and Sensors (CUBS)

=== LEED gold certificate ===
On April 4, 2012 it was announced that the building has been certified "Gold" by LEED. The building exceeds the state's energy efficiency code by 34 percent. Some of its features, making the building green, are as follow:

- An outdoor plaza that includes water-efficient landscaping and methods to capture stormwater
- A small green roof
- Waterless urinals
- Bicycle racks
- Constructed with recycled building materials
- Energy-efficient heating, cooling and ventilation systems
