= Edmund B. Hayes Hall =

- U.S. National Register of Historic Places
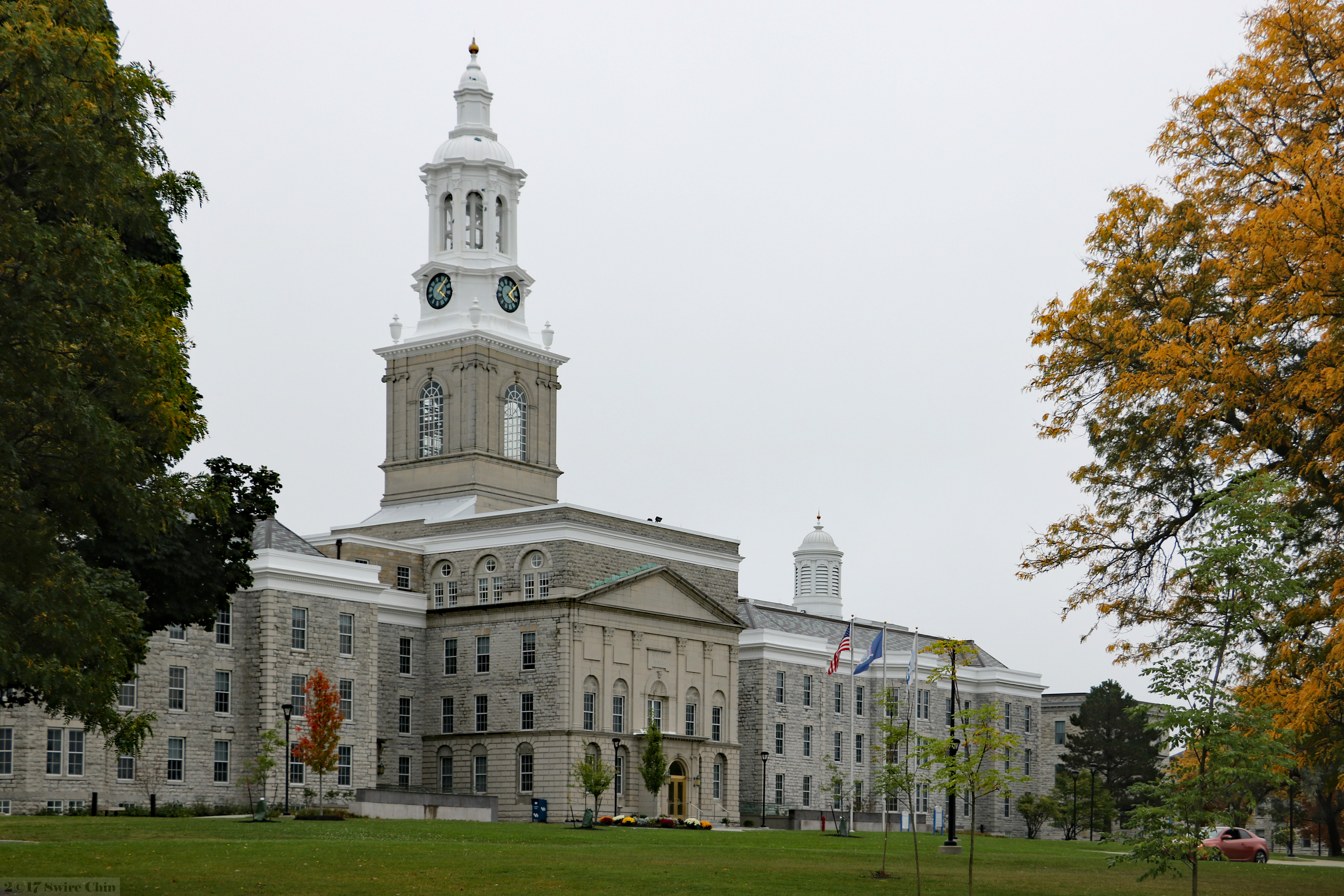
- Interactive map of Edmund B. Hayes Hall
- Location: 3435 Main St., Buffalo, New York
- Coordinates: 42°57′12″N 78°49′14″W
- Area: 1.98 acres (0.80 ha)
- Built: 1874
- Architect: George F. Metzger, Cyrus K. Porter and Sons.
- Architectural style: Colonial Revival (Georgian Revival)
- NRHP reference No.: 16000394
- Added to NRHP: June 21, 2016

Edmund B. Hayes Hall is a historic building on the South Campus of the University at Buffalo. It is a Georgian Revival style building with an attached bell tower. It is named after engineer and businessman Edmund B. Hayes whose bequest funded the remodeling of the facility for university use.

== History ==
Edmund B. Hayes Hall was first built in 1874 to house the Insane Department of the Erie County Almshouse. In 1893, the building was converted into a county hospital that contained 400 beds. The land that the hall is on would be acquired by the University of Buffalo in 1909. By 1927, the university was renovating the building to convert it into a building suitable to hold classes. On February 22, 1928, the building would be dedicated by the university. At the dedication, University at Buffalo chancellor Samuel Capen stated he hoped the building would become a central image to the university saying "from its nature and its central position this building is destined to be the focus of the life of the University for many years, perhaps for many generations. It will be preeminently the visual symbol of the University both to the members of the institution and to the community at large."

The building underwent $45 million in renovations between 2011 and 2016. It was listed on the National Register of Historic Places in 2016.

Edmund B. Hayes Hall serves as the School of Architecture and Planning at the university.

== Gallery ==
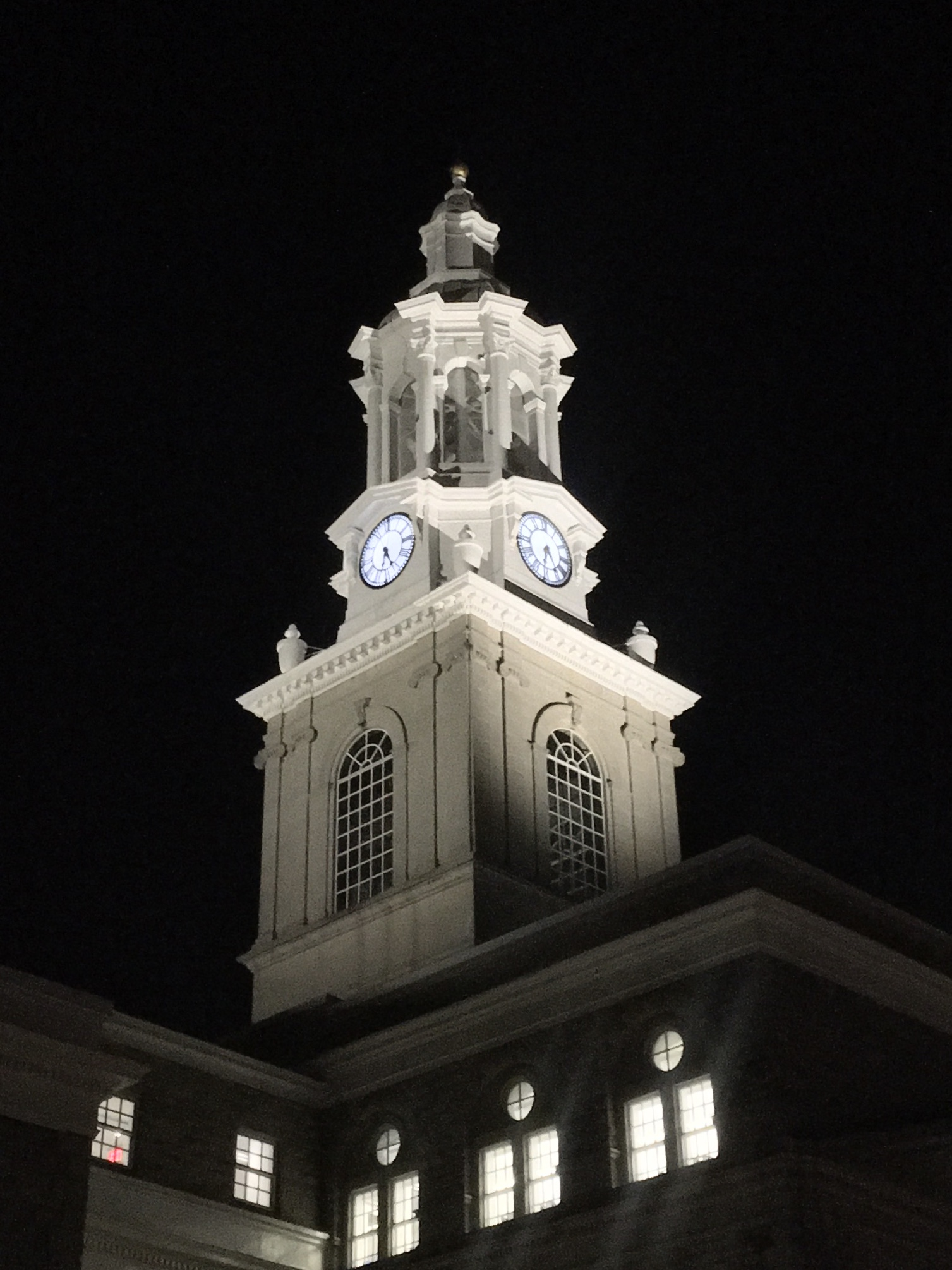
Clock tower at night, 2019

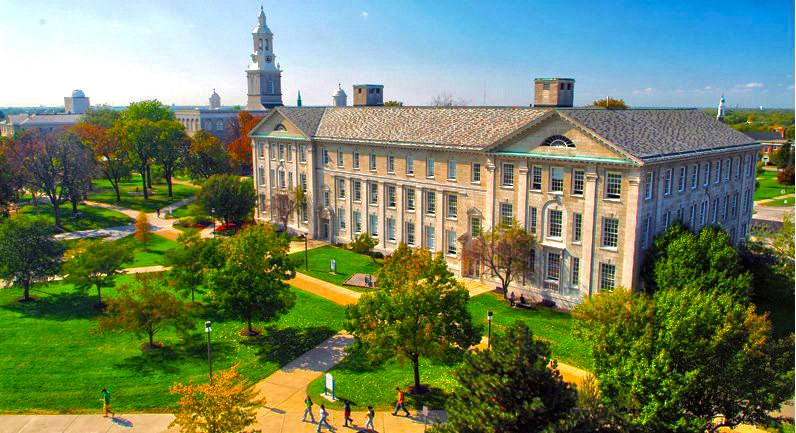
Crosby Hall with Hayes Hall in the background, 2012

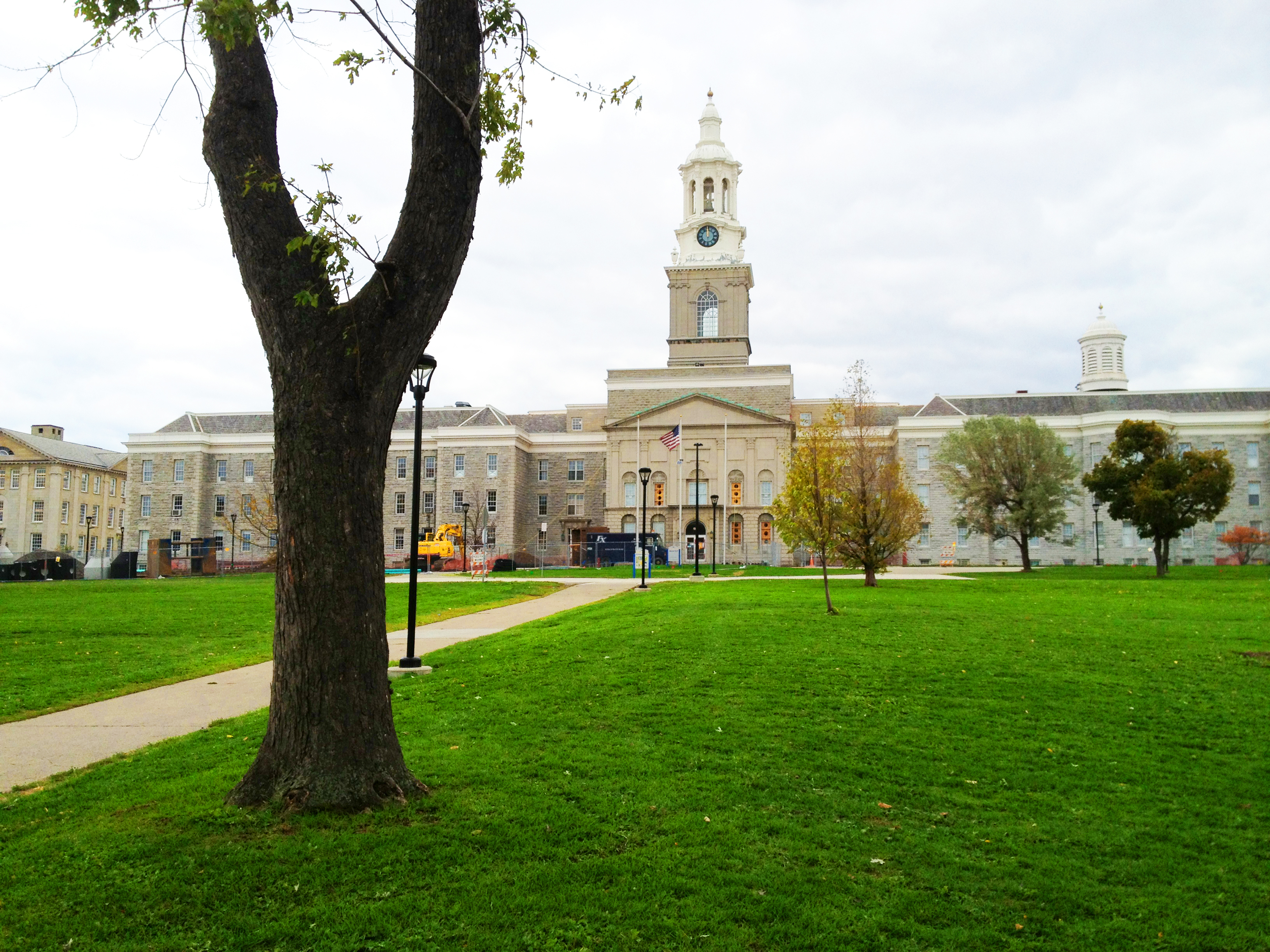
Hayes Hall, 2012
