= University at Buffalo =

Public university in Buffalo, New York, US

State University of New York at Buffalo
- Former name: University of Buffalo (1846–1962)
- Motto: Mens sana in corpore sano (Latin)
- Motto in English: "Sound Mind in a Sound Body"
- Type: Public research university center
- Established: May 11, 1846; 180 years ago
- Founders: Millard Fillmore; Nathan K. Hall; James Platt White
- Parent institution: State University of New York
- Accreditation: MSCHE
- Academic affiliations: AAU; URA; USU; sea-grant; space-grant
- Endowment: $1.17 billion (2025)
- Chancellor: John B. King Jr.
- President: Caroline Attardo Genco
- Provost: A. Scott Weber
- Students: 31,656 (fall 2025)
- Undergraduates: 21,196 (fall 2025)
- Postgraduates: 10,460 (fall 2025)
- Location: Buffalo and Amherst, New York, United States; 43°00′00″N 78°47′21″W
- Campus: 1,346 acres (5.45 km^{2}); Large suburb
- Other campuses: Amherst
- Newspaper: The Spectrum
- Colors: Royal blue and white
- Nickname: Bulls
- Sporting affiliations: NCAA Division I FBS – MAC
- Mascot: Victor E. Bull
- Website: www.buffalo.edu

U.S. National Register of Historic Places
- Official name: Edmund B. Hayes Hall
- Type: Building
- Criteria: Event, Architecture/Engineering
- Designated: June 21, 2016
- Reference no.: 16000394
- Edmund B. Hayes Hall

The State University of New York at Buffalo (commonly referred to as the University at Buffalo (UB), UBuffalo, UBuff, or sometimes SUNY Buffalo) is a public research university in Buffalo and Amherst, New York, United States. The university was founded in 1846 as a private medical college and merged with the State University of New York system in 1962. It is one of two flagship institutions of the SUNY system, along with Stony Brook University. As of fall 2026, the university enrolled nearly 32,000 students in 13 schools and colleges, making it the largest public university in the state of New York.

Since its founding by a group which included future U.S. president Millard Fillmore, the university has evolved from a small medical school to a research university. Today, in addition to the College of Arts and Sciences, the university houses the largest state-operated medical school, dental school, education school, business school, engineering school, and pharmacy school, and is also home to SUNY's only law school. UB has the largest endowment and most research funding among the universities in the SUNY system. The university offers bachelor's degrees in over 140 areas of study, as well as over 220 master's programs and over 95 doctoral programs, and 55 combined degree programs. The University at Buffalo is one of two universities founded by United States Presidents.

The University at Buffalo is classified among "R1: Doctoral Universities – Very high research activity". In 1989, UB was elected to the Association of American Universities. The University at Buffalo intercollegiate athletic teams are the Bulls. They compete in Division I of the NCAA and are members of the Mid-American Conference.

== History ==
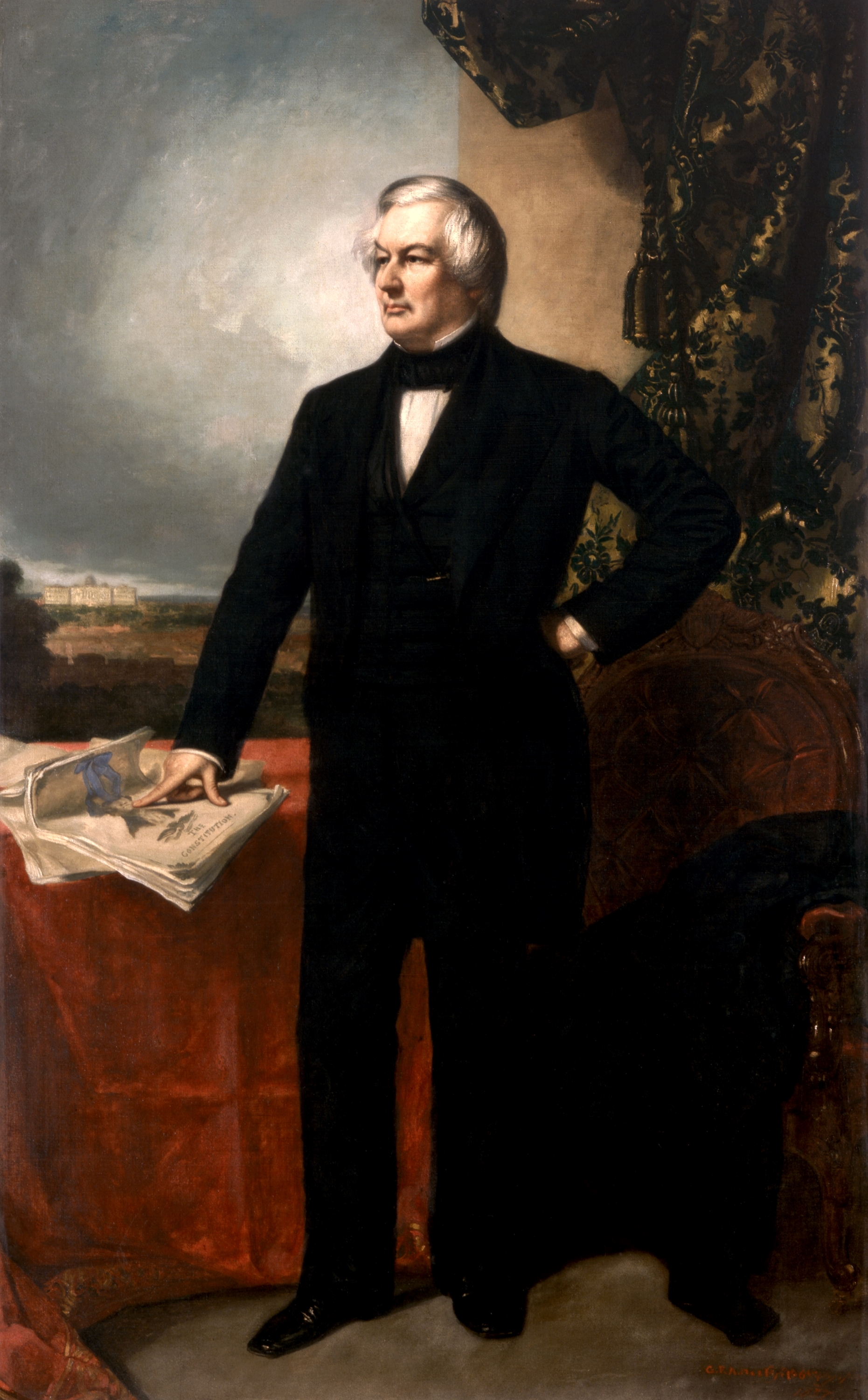
White House portrait of Millard Fillmore

Civic leaders of Buffalo sought to establish a university in the city from its earliest days. A "University of Western New-York" was begun at Buffalo under the auspices of the Presbyterian Church and property was purchased at North Street and College (the site of the later YMCA), on the north side of the Allentown district. The "University of Western New-York" was chartered by the state on April 8, 1836. Following the charter, private funding was secured for the "Western University," which would endow six or seven professorships at $5,000 each; an addition $12,000 or $15,000 was also collected for a general fund, and a building lot was donated by Judge Ebenezer Walden, one of the wealthiest men in the city. However, the project collapsed and no classes were ever offered, and only the layout of the College Street campus remains.

=== Founding ===
The University of Buffalo (as it was originally named) was founded on May 11, 1846, as a private medical school to train physicians for the communities of Buffalo, Niagara Falls, and surrounding villages. Future U.S. President Millard Fillmore, then a lawyer who had recently served in the United States House of Representatives, was one of the principal founders. James Platt White was instrumental in obtaining a charter for the university from the state legislature in 1846. He also taught the first class of 89 men in obstetrics. State Assemblyman Nathan K. Hall was also "particularly active in procuring the charter". The doors first opened to students in 1847 and after associating with a hospital for teaching purposes, the first class of students graduated the medical school in July 1847. Fillmore served as the school's first chancellor, a position he held until 1874, even as he served in other capacities during that time, including Comptroller of New York, U.S. Vice President, and eventually President.

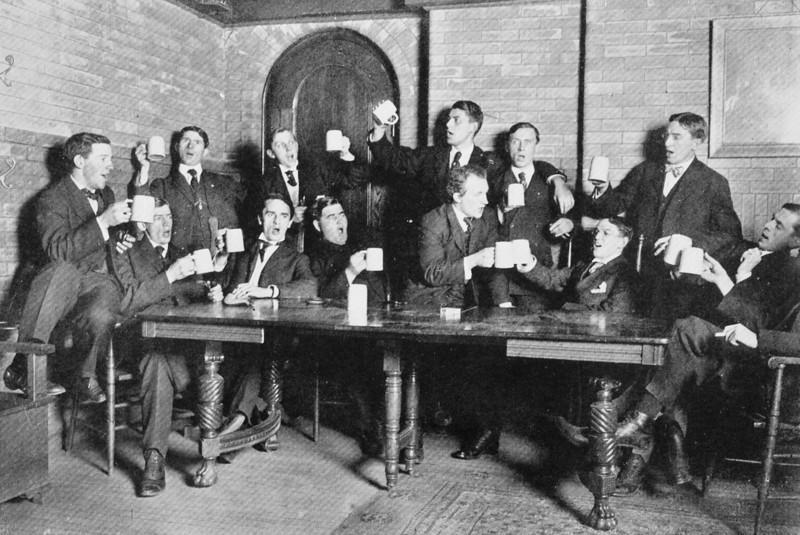
Students singing in a pub (1907)

Initially, the university did not have its own facilities, and early lectures were given at an old post office on Seneca and Washington streets in Buffalo. The first building erected for the university was a stone structure built at the corner of Main and Virginia streets in 1849–50, funded through donations, public subscription, and a state grant. There were continuous expansions to the college medical programs, including a separate pharmacy division, which is now The School of Pharmacy and Pharmaceutical Sciences. In 1887, a law school was organized in Buffalo, which quickly became associated with Niagara University just to the north of Buffalo. Four years later, the law school was acquired by the University of Buffalo as the University of Buffalo Law School, which had a downtown Buffalo facility. In the first few years of the 20th century, the university began planning for a comprehensive undergraduate college to complete the basic structure of a university, and in 1909 the university acquired the Erie County Almshouse grounds from the county of Erie, which became the University of Buffalo's initial campus. The establishment may have been influenced by the 1910 Flexner Report which criticized the preparation of the medical students at the university. With that additional space, in 1915, the then University of Buffalo formed the College of Arts and Sciences, creating an undergraduate division in addition to its prior educational work in the licensed professional fields. In 1916, Grace Millard Knox pledged $500,000 (equivalent to $14,794,000 in 2025) for the establishment of a "department of liberal arts and sciences in the University of Buffalo". The initial gift of $100,000 was for the purchase of what would become Townsend Hall and the remainder was to establish the university's first endowment, in her husband's name, to support the department.

First home of the Medical College

In 1950, the Industrial Engineering department branched off from the Mechanical Engineering department. In 1956, a Civil Engineering Department was formed under Lehigh University graduate Robert L. Ketter, who went on to become Dean of the School of Engineering and Applied Sciences, and later President of the university. In 1959, AM radio station WBFO was launched by UB's School of Engineering and Applied Sciences, and run by UB's students. The station has since become the launching pad of two modern National Public Radio personalities: Terry Gross and Ira Flatow. In 1961, the Western New York nuclear research program was created at the university. This program installed a miniature, active nuclear fission reactor on the university's South (Main Street) Campus. This program was not particularly active, nor could it compete with other government-run research labs, consequently, the programs performed in this facility were abandoned somewhat shortly after its inception. This reactor was decommissioned in 2005 with little fanfare due to material security concerns.

=== Acquisition by the SUNY system and second campus ===
The private University of Buffalo was purchased by and incorporated into the State University of New York (SUNY) system in 1962, and became known as the State University of New York at Buffalo, more commonly known as the University at Buffalo. This acquisition was championed by then-Governor of New York, Nelson Rockefeller. As a part of the agreement to merge the university into the SUNY system, the state began to build an extensive second campus for the university. In 1964, the state acquired several hundred acres in the town of Amherst on the northeast of Buffalo, for development as a comprehensive campus for most of the non-medical disciplines at the University at Buffalo. This is often called the North Campus; it is the center of most University at Buffalo activities. The North Campus project included several major buildings, dormitory complexes, a separate spur of the interstate highway, and a new lake. The undergraduate college, the law school, and graduate schools were all moved to the new campus. During the late 1960s, the College of Arts and Sciences was divided into three separate schools: arts and letters, natural sciences and mathematics, and social sciences. During the 1998–1999 academic year, the three schools were reunited to re-create the existing College of Arts and Sciences, when the faculties of Arts and Letters, Social Sciences, and Natural Sciences and Mathematics were combined, according to a memorandum issued by the State University of New York.

Since 1989, UB has been a member of the Association of American Universities (AAU), an organization of 65 leading research universities in the United States and Canada. UB president Satish K. Tripathi serves on the AAU board of directors.

=== "UB 2020" strategic plan ===
Started in 2004 under President John B. Simpson, UB 2020 was a strategic planning and expansion initiative to develop and implement a vision for the university over the subsequent 15 years. The centerpiece of UB 2020 was to add about 10,000 more students, 750 faculty members and 600 staff, increasing the size of the university by about 40 percent. UB 2020 also recognized the university's contribution to the surrounding region. The most recent estimates of UB's impact on the local and regional economies of Western New York report approximately $1.7 billion are brought into the local economy from the presence of UB. This figure is also expected to rise by 40 percent, corresponding with UB's institutional growth.

One of the keys to helping UB achieve the goals of the UB 2020 plan, proponents said, was the passage of S2020 and A2020, known as the UB 2020 Flexibility and Economic Growth Act, by the New York State Legislature. On June 3, 2009, the State Senate passed S2020 and sent the bill to the Assembly for their consideration.

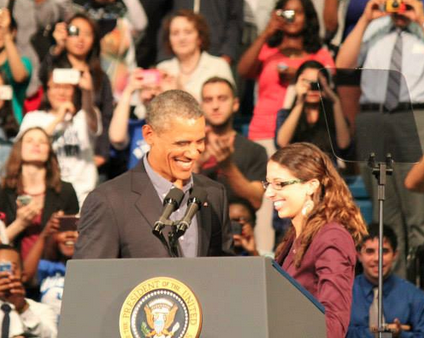
President Barack Obama is introduced at a speech given in Alumni Arena in 2013.

The current president, Satish K. Tripathi, continued his vocal support of UB 2020 and has been actively engaging in campus-wide discussion on the proposed tuition increases introduced by the bill.

In 2011, the School of Medicine and Biomedical Sciences received a donation of $40 million from an alumnus, George Melvin Ellis Jr., MD, who earned his medical degree from the university in 1945. The donation contributed to the $375 million project which has relocated the School of Medicine and Biomedical Sciences to UB's downtown campus. The new school building was designed by HOK Architects. A subsequent donation of $30 million from Jeremy Jacobs and family was received in 2015 and the medical school was renamed the Jacobs School of Medicine and Biomedical Sciences.

From FY2011 to FY2012, UB spent over $300 million on the strategic plan to construct and open four new buildings, including Davis Hall, William R. Greiner Residence Hall, the Clinical and Translational Research Center and Kaleida Health medical research building, and Crossroads Culinary Center.

On August 22, 2013, President Barack Obama came to UB's campus to give a speech about needed higher education reform in the country. President Obama highlighted UB's accolades and specifically chose Buffalo for its excellence and commitment to the future, graduation rates and retention, and quality education at an affordable price.

As part of the UB 2020 initiative, "Heart of the Campus" projects were initiated in phases on each of UB's three campuses. In Fall 2019, UB began construction of the One World Café, an "international eatery" located on North Campus, adjacent to Capen Hall, Norton Hall, and Founder's Plaza.

Beginning in 2019, UB took steps to distance the institution from Millard Fillmore and ceased its co-sponsorship of his annual gravesite ceremony, due to his controversial policies regarding slavery in the United States. A year later, Fillmore's name was removed from the Millard Fillmore Academic Center, and the names of UB's fourth chancellor James O. Putnam and SUNY regent Peter Buell Porter were also removed from campus due to the former's openly racist views and the latter's ownership of slaves.

== Name ==
The university's official legal name is "State University of New York at Buffalo". It is commonly known as the "University at Buffalo" (UB). The institution was known as the "University of Buffalo" for over a century. Other names such as "SUNY Buffalo", "SUNY at Buffalo", and "Buffalo" are also used. The university's athletic department, particularly on uniforms, uses the name "Buffalo".

== Administration and organization ==
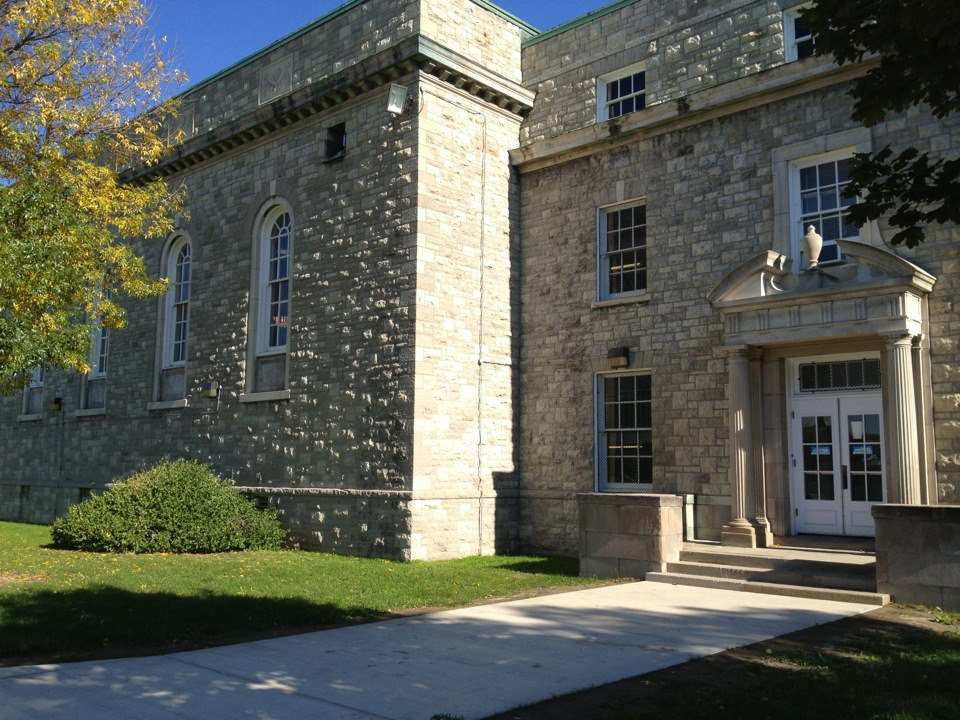
Clark Hall on UB's South Campus

Buffalo is a public university and is one of four university centers of the 64 campuses in the State University of New York (SUNY) which enrolled 467,991 students and employed 88,024 academic staff in 2014. SUNY is governed by an 18-member Board of Trustees, of which 16 vote. 15 of the voting members are appointed by the Governor of New York and the remaining voting member is elected by students as President of the Student Assembly of the State University of New York. The other two members are non-voting faculty from the University Faculty Senate and Faculty Council of Community Colleges. Merryl Tisch is the Chairman of the SUNY Board of Trustees and John King Jr. is the Chancellor of the SUNY system. Satish K. Tripathi was appointed by the SUNY Board of Trustees as the 15th president of the University at Buffalo in April 2011, becoming the first international-born president the school has had. He previously held a six-year tenure as the UB provost and executive vice president for academic affairs. He receives compensation of $385,000, $115,000, and $150,000 annually from each of the university, SUNY Research Foundation, and the UB Foundation respectively. The University at Buffalo Foundation (UB Foundation) was chartered in 1962 as an independent non-profit corporation and is controlled by a privately appointed board of trustees. It serves as a vehicle to raise private funds for the university, develop real estate, and manage endowment investments on behalf of the university. The foundation managed a $685.2 million endowment for FY2011.

UB is organized into 13 academic schools and colleges.

- The School of Architecture and Planning is the only combined architecture and urban planning school in the State University of New York system, offers the only accredited professional master's degree in architecture, and is one of two SUNY schools that offer an accredited professional master's degree in urban planning. In addition, the School of Architecture and Planning also awards the original undergraduate four year pre-professional degrees in architecture and environmental design in the SUNY system. Other degree programs offered by the School of Architecture and Planning include a research-oriented Master of Science in architecture with specializations in historic preservation/urban design, inclusive design, and computing and media technologies; a PhD in urban and regional planning; and, an advanced graduate certificate in historic preservation.
- The College of Arts and Sciences was founded in 1915 and is the largest and most comprehensive academic unit at UB with 29 degree-granting departments, 16 academic programs, and 23 centers and institutes across the humanities, arts, and sciences.
- The School of Dental Medicine was founded in 1892 and offers accredited programs in DDS, oral surgery, and other oral sciences.
- The Graduate School of Education was founded in 1931 and is one of the largest graduate schools at UB. The school has four academic departments: counseling and educational psychology, educational leadership and policy, learning and instruction, and information science. In academic year 2008–2009, the Graduate School of Education awarded 472 master's degrees and 52 doctoral degrees.
- The School of Engineering and Applied Sciences was founded in 1946 and offers undergraduate and graduate degrees in six departments. It is the largest public school of engineering in the state of New York. UB is the only public school in New York State to offer a degree in Aerospace Engineering
- The School of Law was founded in 1887 and is the only law school in the SUNY system. The school awarded 265 JD degrees in the 2009–2010 academic year.
- The School of Management was founded in 1923 and offers AACSB-accredited undergraduate, MBA, and doctoral degrees.
- The Jacobs School of Medicine and Biomedical Sciences is the founding faculty of the UB and began in 1846. It offers undergraduate and graduate degrees in the biomedical and biotechnical sciences as well as an MD program and residencies.
- The School of Nursing was founded in 1936 and offers bachelors, clinical doctorate, and research doctorate degrees, along with advanced certificates.
- The School of Pharmacy and Pharmaceutical Sciences was founded in 1886, making it the second-oldest faculty at UB and one of two pharmacy schools in the SUNY system.
- The School of Public Health and Health Professions was founded in 2003 from the merger of the Department of Social and Preventive Medicine and the UB School of Health Related Professions. The school offers bachelor's, professional, master's, and doctoral degrees.
- The School of Social Work offers graduate MSW and doctoral degrees in social work.
- The Roswell Park Graduate Division is an affiliated academic unit within the Graduate School of UB, in partnership with Roswell Park Comprehensive Cancer Center, an independent NCI-designated Comprehensive Cancer Center. The Roswell Park Graduate Division offers five PhD programs and two MS programs in basic and translational biomedical research related to cancer. Roswell Park Comprehensive Cancer Center was founded in 1898 by Roswell Park and was the world's first cancer research institute.

The University at Buffalo Department of Media Study, located on the North Campus, provides facilities for experimental media production, including video, sound, and digital art studios.

== Academics ==
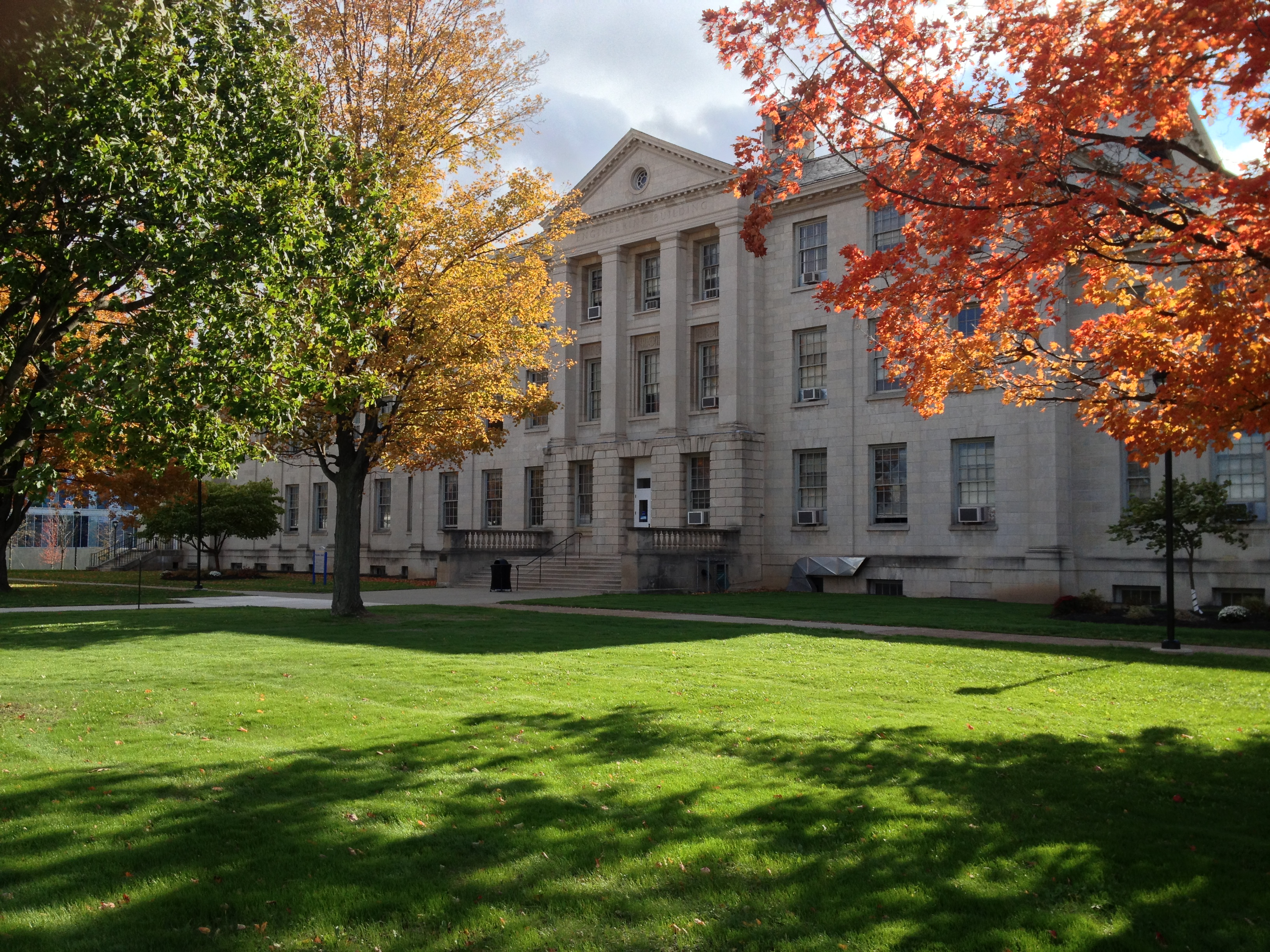
Parker Hall on the university's South Campus

The University at Buffalo is a large, public research university with very high research activity. In 2020, the university offered 140+ undergraduate programs, 220+ master's programs, 95+ doctoral programs and 55+ combined degree programs.

The four-year, full-time undergraduate program comprises the majority of enrollments at the university which emphasizes a balanced curriculum across the arts, sciences, and professions. The university enrolled 21,607 undergraduate and 9,896 graduate students in the fall of 2018. Women make up 48% of the student body and 78% of the student body is from the state of New York. Over 7,000 students live in on-campus residential halls and 10,172 students live off campus in affiliated housing (including on-campus affiliated housing). Over 79% of students live on campus their first year. Undergraduate tuition, room & board, and fees for New York state residents for the 2020–2021 school year totals $24,860 and costs to out-of-state residents totals $42,330. New York State also offers free tuition for all public college and universities through the Excelsior Scholarship program for families who have an income of lower than $125,000 and are residents of the state. Other requirements to qualify for free tuition include full-time enrollment and staying in the state for a number of years after graduating.

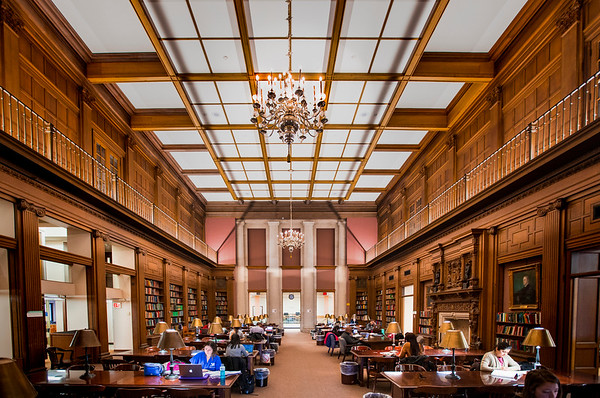
UB's Health and Sciences Library, Abbott Hall, South Campus

UB is noted for offering an early Computer Science major that was distinct from a mathematics major.

University at Buffalo academic and professional faculty are represented by United University Professions. The two UUP chapters at the University at Buffalo are Health Sciences and Buffalo Center. United University Professions has over 34,000 members at 29 campuses of SUNY. The organization serves as the collective bargaining agent representing SUNY faculty and professional staff, negotiating contracts and employment conditions.

=== Admissions ===
UB offers some flexibility in admission deadlines. For the Class of 2024 (enrolling Fall 2020), the university received 27,652 applications and accepted 15,233 (55.1%), with 4,119 enrolling. The middle 50% range of SAT scores for enrolling freshmen was 600–699 for math, 600–699 for evidence-based reading and writing, and the ACT composite score range was 24–29.

=== Rankings and reputation ===
Academic rankings

National
- Forbes: 134
- U.S. News & World Report: 75 (tie)
- Washington Monthly: 129
- WSJ/College Pulse: 124

Global
- ARWU: 401–500
- QS: =410
- THE: 251–300
- U.S. News & World Report: 369 (tie)

Forbes's 2025 American Top Colleges list ranked UB 134th in overall, and 57th among US public universities. U.S. News & World Report's the 2023–2024 Best Colleges ranked UB 76 on their list of "Best National Universities", and 36th among public universities. U.S. News ranking of best online programs ranks UB eighth in "Best Online Bachelor's Programs" and 25th in "Best Online Graduate Education Programs".

In the Wall Street Journal/Times Higher Education 2021 ranking of top colleges and universities, the University at Buffalo was ranked as the 31st best public university and the 121st best college in the nation. In the "World University Rankings 2022", Times Higher Education ranked UB at 251–300. U.S. News & World Report ranked the university 277 on their "Best Global Universities" ranking in 2022.

In 2024, Washington Monthly ranked University of Buffalo 129th among 438 national universities in the U.S. based on Buffalo's contribution to the public good, as measured by social mobility, research, and promoting public service.

The Academic Ranking of World Universities (ARWU) 2021 ranked the Civil Engineering department 5th in the U.S. and 25th globally (World). The ARWU ranked the UB dental school 8th in nation and 10th in the world for dentistry and oral sciences. The School of Management is ranked 70th by U.S. News, 42nd by Forbes and 78th by BusinessWeek, making UB the highest ranked public business school in New York. The School of Education at UB is ranked 70th. The School of Public Health and Health Professions is ranked 31st, the School of Nursing is ranked 91st for masters, 73rd for doctorate, with the anesthesia program ranking tenth in the nation. The School of Pharmacy and Pharmaceutical Sciences is ranked 22nd, the School of Social Work is ranked 24th, the School of Law is ranked 94th. UB was ranked the 56th Best College for Veterans.

The audiology program is ranked 17th, rehabilitation counseling is ranked 21st, speech-language pathology is ranked 30th, English is ranked 44th, library and information studies is ranked 39th, math is 73rd, physics is 85th, fine arts is 69th, political science is 76th, history is 92nd, physical therapy is 79th, occupational therapy is 32nd, computer science is 63rd, chemistry is 76th, statistics is 70th, psychology is 63rd, and clinical psychology is ranked 50th.

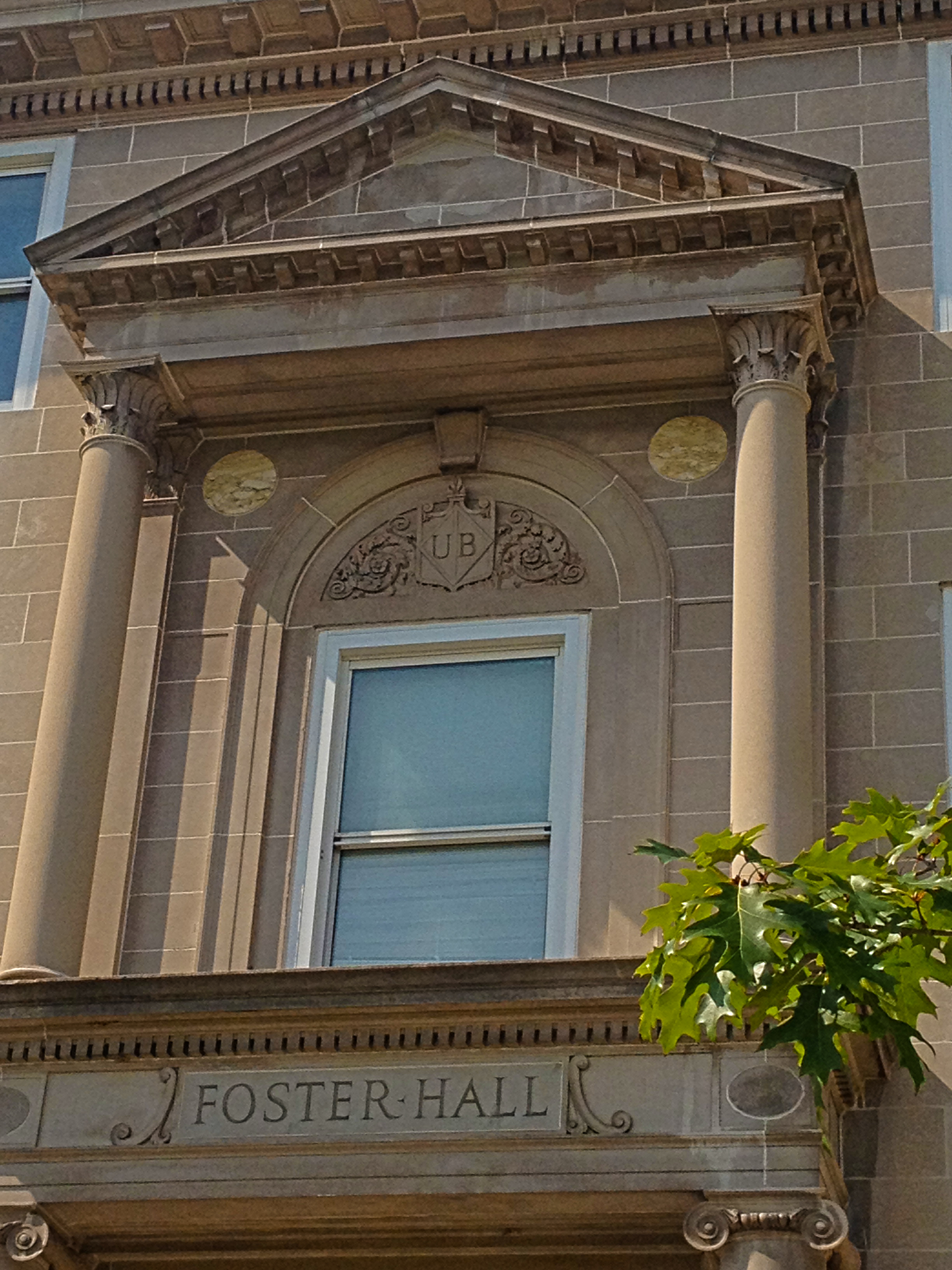
Historic Foster Hall on UB's South Campus

The Environmental Protection Agency (EPA) ranks UB first on their "Green Power List" of top colleges and universities. In Kiplinger's "Best Values in Public Colleges" of 2017, the University at Buffalo ranks 54th in the nation for in-state students and 70th in the nation for out-of-state students.

=== Research ===
UB is classified as an R1 university and houses two of the thirteen New York State Centers of Excellence: the Center of Excellence in Bioinformatics and Life Sciences (CBLS) and the Center of Excellence in Materials Informatics (CMI).

Total research expenditures for the fiscal year of 2017 were $401 million, ranking 59th nationally. Expenditures were up to $540 million by 2026.

=== Libraries ===
UB has nine libraries on its South (Buffalo), North (Amherst), and Downtown (Buffalo) campuses. The libraries' 4.3 million-plus print volumes are augmented by extensive digital resources, including full-text electronic journals, databases, media, and special collections, which include a collection of James Joyce manuscripts and artifacts.

== Campuses ==
The University at Buffalo is the state's largest and most comprehensive public university and is spread across three campuses: North Campus, South Campus, and Downtown Campus. The Sustainable Endowments Institute's College Sustainability Report Card awarded the university a B+. UB was awarded the EPA "Environmental Champion Award" in 2015 and is ranked as one of the top 50 "green colleges and universities" in the nation, working towards becoming climate neutral by 2030.

=== North Campus ===
The North Campus, a census-designated place also called "University at Buffalo", located in the suburb of Amherst, began in the 1970s. Many academic programs, including the entirety of the undergraduate College of Arts and Sciences, the University at Buffalo Law School, the School of Engineering and Applied Sciences, the School of Management, the Graduate School of Social Work, and the Graduate School of Education, as well as Lockwood Memorial Library, Oscar A. Silverman Library, and many administrative offices, are located on UB's North Campus.

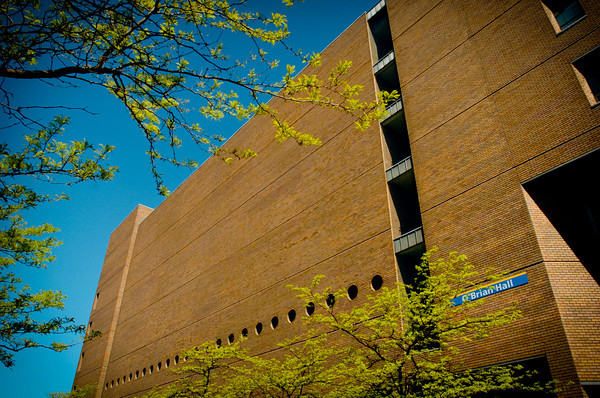
O'Brian Hall, home to the School of Law

The North Campus is home to administrative and academic offices. The main buildings are arranged along one academic "spine", a second floor connecting corridor, that connects most of the main academic buildings. The whole campus covers 1,192 acres (5 km^{2}) with 146 buildings containing 6,715,492 sq ft (623,890 m^{2}), 11 residence halls and 5 apartment complexes. Its size was supported by the implementation of a shuttle system circling the academic sector and surrounding areas including the administrative complex, located nearly a quarter mile from the central academic area. When originally built by the state of New York, the North Campus was provided with two Interstate exits, from I-290 and I-990, its own internal parkway, the John James Audubon Parkway, and two small lakes created from Ellicott Creek. As a census-designated place, the residential population recorded at the 2010 census was 6,066.

The North Campus offers a variety of entertainment programming and activity for students. It contains the Student Union, which houses offices for the Student Association and student-interest clubs; Slee Hall, which presents contemporary and classical music concerts; Broadview Arena, the home-court for University Athletics; the UB Center for the Arts, a non-profit presenter of a wide variety of professional entertainment and Broadview Stadium, the 30,000 seat football stadium.

=== South Campus ===
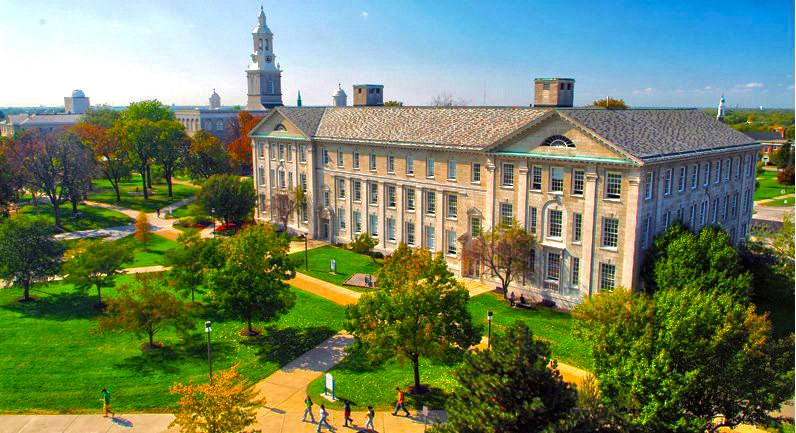
Overlooking UB's South Campus with a view of Edmund B. Hayes Hall

The South Campus, also known as the Main Street campus, located on 154 acres (0.62 km^{2}) in North Buffalo, is the former grounds of the Erie County Almshouse and Insane Asylum, of which four buildings still remain (Hayes Hall, the former insane asylum; Wende Hall, a former maternity hospital; Hayes D; and Townsend Hall, a former nurses' quarters). Edmund B. Hayes Hall located on South Campus is a registered U.S. National Historical Place. The college was designed by architect E.B. Green in 1910, and was intended to resemble Trinity College Dublin. Its 53 buildings contain (3,045,198 sq ft (282,908 m^{2})) and include two residence halls. This campus is served by the northernmost subway station on Buffalo's Niagara Frontier Metro Rail system.

Today, the South Campus is home to the School of Nursing, School of Pharmacy, Dental School, and the School of Architecture and Urban Planning. In addition, the University at Buffalo South Campus is the home of the WBFO radio station, the university's biomedical science research complex, the Health Sciences Library, and certain administrative offices.

=== Downtown Campus ===
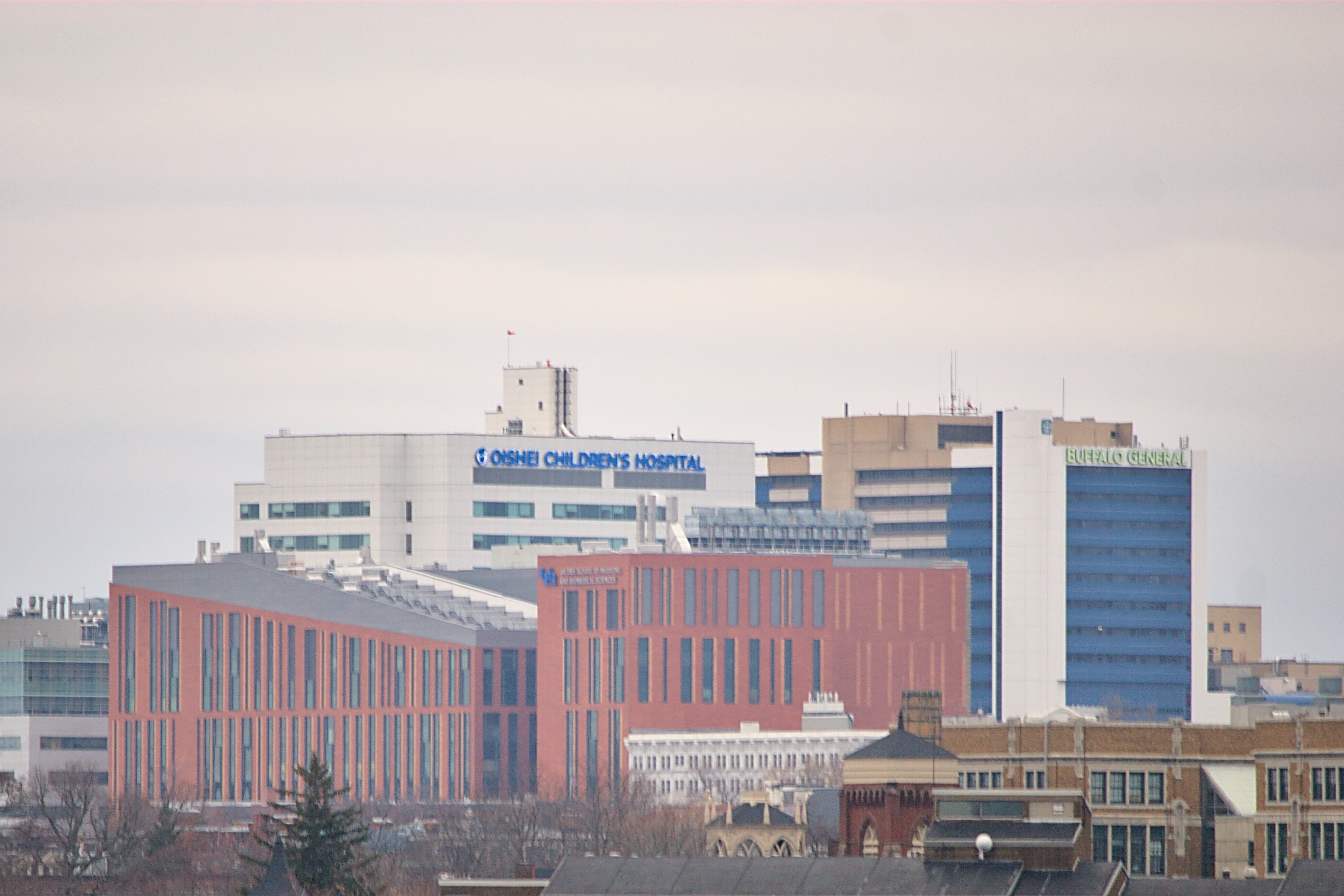
View of UB Downtown campus, with Jacobs School of Medicine at center

In 2002, UB commissioned Boston firm Chan Krieger to create a third campus center. The Downtown Campus is the site of the Jacobs School of Medicine and Biomedical Sciences as well as UB's New York State Center of Excellence in Bioinformatics and Life Science, which partners in research with UB's Ira G. Ross Eye Institute as well as the Roswell Park Comprehensive Cancer Center and Hauptman-Woodward Medical Research Institute to compose the Buffalo-Niagara Medical Campus. The medical campus, which is designed to meet LEED Silver criteria, incorporates high efficiency lighting, heat recovery systems, and an Energy Star roof.

Also located in the downtown area is UB's Clinical and Research Institute on Addictions (CRIA), Educational Opportunity Center (EOC) and the Jacobs Executive Development Center (JEDC). The campus includes six major properties and a total of 43 buildings, counting shared lease space (588,506 sq ft (54,674 m^{2})).

In September 2007, UB added the former M. Wile and Company Factory Building on the southeast corner of Goodell and Ellicott streets and the former Trico Products Corp. building complex on the northwest corner of Goodell and Ellicott streets to its properties downtown. The UB Regional Institute, Center on Rehabilitation Synergy, and a number of pre-K-16 initiatives related to UB's civic engagement mission, such as the UB-Buffalo Public Schools Partnership office, are set to relocate to the first site. The latter location has been purchased to house additional biomedical and life science-related businesses connected to the Buffalo-Niagara Medical Campus.

==== Teaching hospitals ====
UB's teaching hospitals include Buffalo General Hospital, Erie County Medical Center, Millard Fillmore Hospital, Roswell Park Comprehensive Cancer Center, Veterans Affairs Western New York Health Care System, and the Golisano Children's Hospital of Buffalo. Additional facilities include free clinics such as the Kaleida Health's Niagara Family Health Center and the Lighthouse Free Medical Clinic, a program run by UB medical students.

==== UB art galleries ====
UB is home to two university art galleries: the UB Anderson Art Gallery and the UB Art Gallery at the Center for the Arts. Adjacent to the UB South Campus is the UB Anderson Art Gallery, a converted elementary school with an all-glass atrium exhibit space. The UB Anderson Gallery hosts exhibitions curated by faculty and visiting curators and features works from international and professional artist in its two floor facility. The UB Anderson Gallery building, along with over 1,200 works of art, was donated to the university in 2000 by collector and gallery owner David K. Anderson, son of legendary New York gallerist Martha Jackson. Selections from the personal collection of Jackson that was donated to the UB Anderson Gallery by David Anderson are on display in a 360 degree permanent installation in the Martha Jackson Gallery Archives and Research Center, on the second floor of the gallery.

The UB Art Gallery at the Center for the Arts is located on the north campus, and features works from contemporary artists, as well as faculty and students across disciplines.

==== Comprehensive Physical Plan ====
The University at Buffalo has grown to an enrollment of approximately 30,000 undergraduate and graduate students, and a staff of 14,000 employees, across three campuses in the last 160 years. In order to accommodate both students and faculty, the university is currently implementing a $4.5 million Comprehensive Physical Plan to help in growth as well as to best utilize and enhance current facilities. Connecting all three campuses, as well as the facilities UB uses, is also a major element of the project. The firm granted the contract to lead the project is Beyer Blinder Belle.

The comprehensive physical planning process is broken into four phases. Currently, UB is implementing "phase one" by seeking input from the local and university communities to pinpoint issues, opportunities, and concerns related to this expansion. The project recognizes UB's potential for excellence, in regard to the university's physical environment, by highlighting and evaluating various positive and negative attributes of the three campuses, including housing, circulation, functionality, landscape, and community interface.

=== Campus demographics ===
Historical population
Census	Pop.	Note	%±
2010	6,066		—
2020	6,798		12.1%
U.S. Decennial Census; 2010 2020

University at Buffalo is also a census-designated place (CDP) covering the campus.

University at Buffalo CDP, New York – demographic profile (NH = Non-Hispanic)
Race / ethnicity	Pop 2010	Pop 2020	% 2010	% 2020
White alone (NH)	3,761	3,646	62.00%	53.63%
Black or African American alone (NH)	479	980	7.90%	14.42%
Native American or Alaska Native alone (NH)	9	11	0.15%	0.16%
Asian alone (NH)	1,348	1,304	22.22%	19.18%
Pacific Islander alone (NH)	1	4	0.02%	0.06%
Some other race alone (NH)	23	42	0.38%	0.62%
Mixed-race/multi-racial (NH)	139	178	2.29%	2.62%
Hispanic or Latino (any race)	306	633	5.04%	9.31%
Total	6,066	6,798	100.00%	100.00%

Note: the US Census treats Hispanic/Latino as an ethnic category. This table excludes Latinos from the racial categories and assigns them to a separate category. Hispanics/Latinos can be of any race.

The CDP is mostly located within Sweet Home Central School District with a portion in Williamsville Central School District.

== Student life ==
Undergraduate demographics as of Fall 2023
Race and ethnicity	Total
White	45%
Asian	18%
Black	17%
International student	12%
Hispanic	9%
Two or more races	3%
Unknown	3%
Economic diversity
Low-income (Note: The percentage of students who received an income-based federal Pell grant intended for low-income students.)	32%
Affluent (Note: The percentage of students who are a part of the American middle class at the bare minimum.)	68%

=== Associations and activities ===
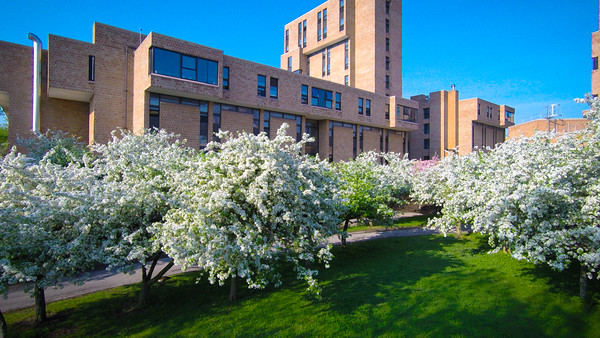
UB North Campus Ellicott Complex

UB has two student-run periodicals: The Spectrum, and Subject, both of which are run as independent nonprofits. The Spectrum is a campus newspaper, which distributes on campus and online. Subject is a student-run online multimedia outlet that includes student-written articles, and radio shows, video, and podcasts by students and alumni.

Subject was founded in 2020 by alumni of former campus radio station WRUB, and campus magazine Generation,, after Sub-Board I, the student services corporation that funded them both, was shut down in 2019.

After the retirement of John B. Simpson, the undergraduate students have also developed a university forum with the hopes of developing a thriving online campus. This move was supported by now-incumbent president Satish K. Tripathi who called it a "model of University spirit and entrepreneurship".

The UB Student Alumni Association (UBSAA) annually hosts the world's largest collegiate mud-volleyball game known as "Oozefest". One hundred ninety-two teams of at least six students compete in a double elimination volleyball tournament at "The Mud Pit" each Spring before finals. Fire trucks are brought in to saturate the dirt courts to create the mud. Awards are handed out to not only the victors, but the most creatively dressed. In the past, students have worn business suits and even dresses to the tournament.

Held annually from 1991 to 2018 has been the Linda Yalem Safety Run, formerly called the Linda Yalem Memorial Run. Linda Yalem was a sophomore at UB who was studying communications and training for the New York City Marathon when she was raped and killed by Altemio Sanchez after going for a run on the Ellicott Creek Bike Path on September 29, 1990. The Run was held every year in her memory and to promote safety for runners.

In 1923, an honorary senior society called Bisonhead was founded. It has since represented twelve undergraduate leaders at UB each year.

Many of UB's clubs, such as the UB Accounting Association, are run through the Undergraduate Student Association and the Graduate Student Association, with each level requiring respective senate recognition for clubs.

=== Student housing ===
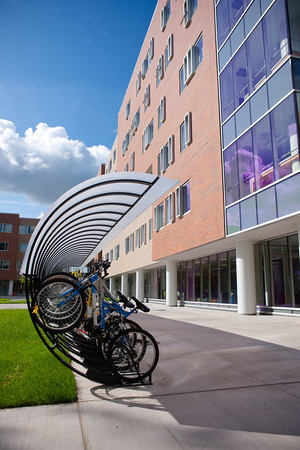
Greiner Hall on North Campus

Student residence halls are located on both the North and South Campuses. On the North Campus, there is the Ellicott Complex, which consists of Evans (formerly Porter), Fargo, Red Jacket, Richmond, Spaulding, and Wilkeson Quadrangles. The Ellicott Complex is also known as "Lego Land" because the shapes of the buildings resemble Legos stacked upon each other. Next to Fargo Quad is the newly built in 2011 Greiner Hall, a dorm strictly for sophomores. Also on North Campus is the Governors Complex, home to the Freshman Honors Housing and various other living communities. There are also off-campus housing options close to the north campus such as The Triad Apartments.

On South Campus is Goodyear and Clement Hall. The unique aspect of these dorms is that residents share a bathroom with the adjacent room, rather than have a communal bathroom. Up until Spring of 2011, there were four other dorm buildings, referred to as "The Quad": MacDonald (named for Lillias MacDonald, UB's first dean of women), Pritchard, Schoellkopf, and Michael Hall. Michael Hall currently exists as the Student Health Center, the other three were demolished in 2018.

In 1999, the university built its first apartment complex for families and graduate students at Flickinger Court. Since the success of Flickinger, UB has developed South Lake Village, Hadley Village, Flint Village, and Creekside Apartments. Most students who wish to still live on or near the North Campus but enjoy the lifestyle of apartment living take advantage of these apartments. University Village at Sweethome, Villas at Rensch, and Villas at Chestnut Ridge are student apartment communities adjacent to the North Campus and offer a shuttle service. Collegiate Village off campus apartments offers transportation to both North and South Campus. Students also find housing in private locations. Those locations are generally situated in the University Heights district of Buffalo, and other areas close to the North and South Campuses. The school assigns rooms based on a lottery system.

== Athletics ==
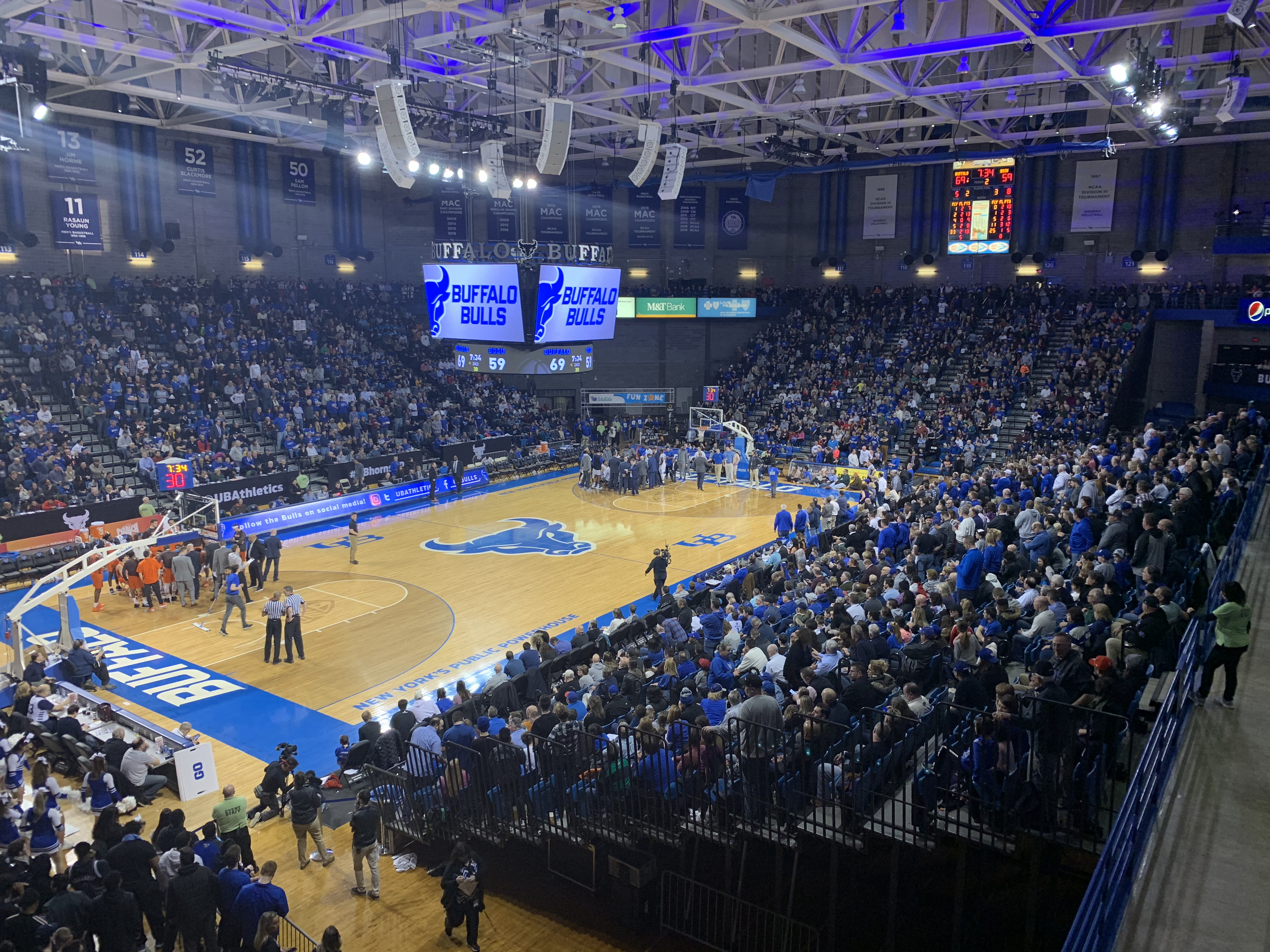
Broadview Arena, 2019

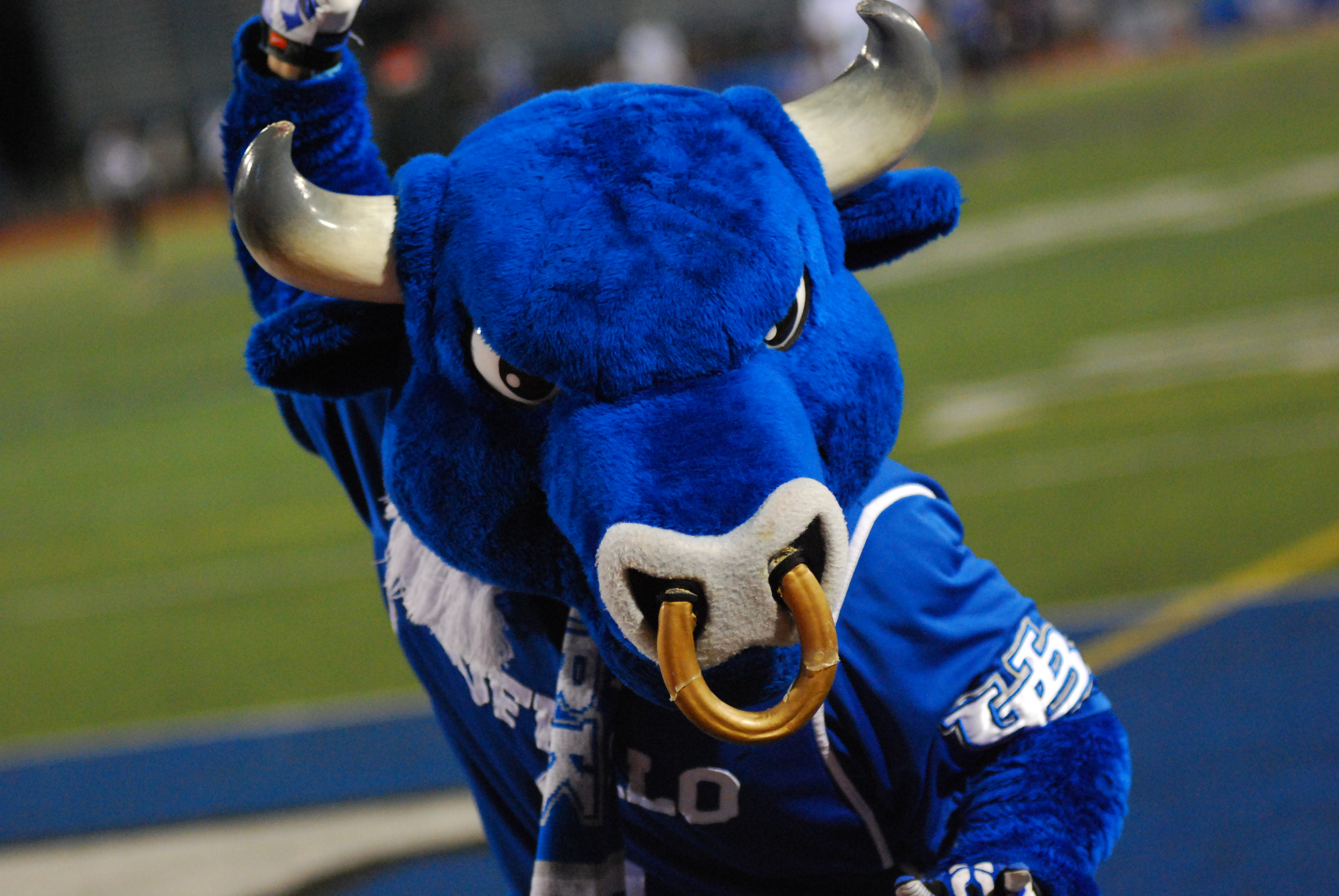
UB mascot Victor E. Bull

The university's sports teams are known as the Buffalo Bulls, or UB Bulls. The Bulls compete in Division I (Division I FBS of the NCAA in football), and are a member of the Mid-American Conference (MAC) for all sports. The Bulls have been a member of the Mid-American Conference since 1998.

Buffalo is the only SUNY school to field a Division I FBS football team, the highest level of college football.

Buffalo Bulls field athletic teams in many other sports as well. Men's team sports at UB include those in football, basketball, track and field, wrestling, cross country, and tennis. The Bulls' women's teams feature basketball, track and field, cross country, volleyball, softball, soccer, tennis, and swimming and diving. The Bulls have had many athletes turn professional in football, baseball, basketball, soccer, and volleyball.

Over 30 Buffalo Bulls baseball players have been selected in the MLB draft. Notable Buffalo baseball alumni include: Joe Hesketh, Tom Murphy, Bill Schuster, Eddie Basinski and Steve Geltz. The Women's Varsity Rowing team won the CAA Colonial Athletic Association championship in April 2010 for the first time. In May 2010, the team won the Jack & Nancy Seitz Women's Point Trophy at the Dad Vail Regatta for the third year in a row. Rowing became a club sport at the end of the 2017 Spring semester. In 2015 UB's men track and field star, Jonathan Jones, became the first national champion in UB's Division I history when he won the shot put at the NCAA Outdoor Track and Field Championships.

The mascot of UB's athletic teams is Victor E. Bull, a blue bull. The university is home to the Thunder of the East marching band. The band performs at all home football games and travels to both local and national parades and competitions. Buffalo has three fight songs: "Victory March", "Go for a Touchdown", and "Buffalo Fight Song".

=== Basketball ===
The men's basketball team plays their home games at the 6,783 seat Broadview Arena. The Bulls were champions of the Mid-American Conference in 2015, 2016, 2018 and 2019 and thus earned the automatic bid to March Madness in each of those seasons. In 2018 the Bulls upset No. 4 seed Arizona in the first round of March Madness, advancing to the second round (round of 32) for the first time in school history. In the 2018–19 season Buffalo, led by C.J. Massinburg, earned a national ranking for the first time in the Associated Press poll. The basketball team was nationally ranked for most of the season with a high ranking of #11 on both the AP and Coaches Polls. For the second year in a row the Bulls won a game in the NCAA tournament, defeating Arizona State.

The women's basketball team won the MAC championship and made their first trip to the NCAA tournament in program history in 2016. In 2017 the women's team made another trip to the NCAA Tournament beating South Florida in the first round and Florida State in the second round, making the sweet sixteen for the first time in program history. The team finished with a final ranking of #21 in the Coaches Poll. In 2019, the men's and women's basketball teams both won the MAC championship on the same day, the second time the Bulls had done so in four seasons. The women's team defeated Rutgers in the NCAA tournament in their third appearance in March Madness in four years.

=== Football ===
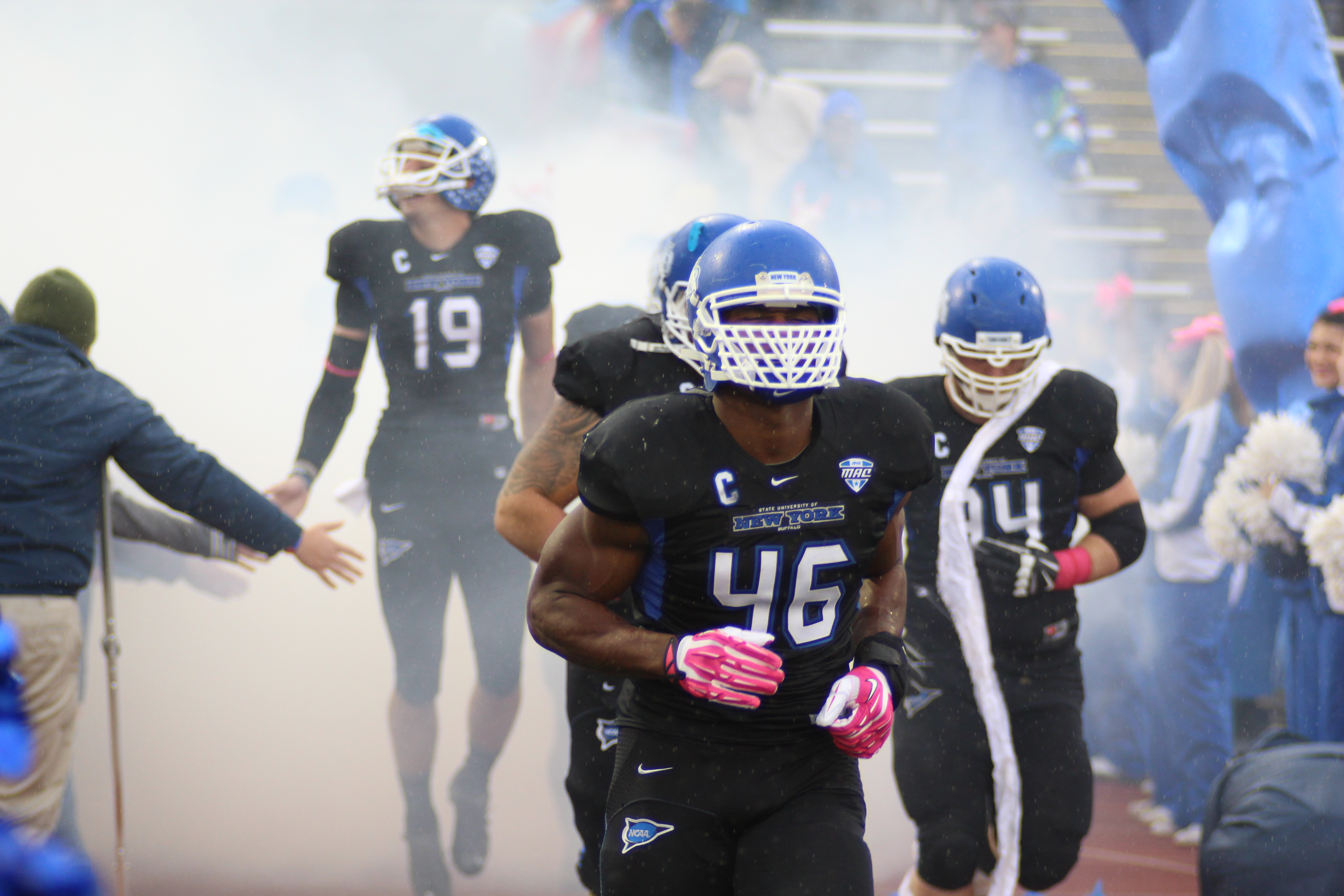
Linebacker Khalil Mack from the University at Buffalo

The university football team plays their home games at the 31,000+ capacity Broadview Stadium. In 1958, the football team won the Lambert Cup, emblematic of supremacy in Eastern U.S. small-college football. That led to the team's first bowl invitation, to the Tangerine Bowl in Orlando, Florida, against Florida State University. But the Bulls would be allowed to participate only if backup defensive end Mike Wilson and starting halfback Willie Evans, who were black, did not play. The team stood behind the two, and refused the bowl offer. Buffalo did not receive another bowl invitation until the 2008 season when they won the MAC championship against previously undefeated Ball State.

Several UB football stars from the 1950s and early 1960s went on to play professional football, including quarterback John Stofa with the American Football League's Miami Dolphins and Cincinnati Bengals, and defensive lineman Gerry Philbin with the AFL's New York Jets. Philbin is a member of the AFL Hall of Fame and the All-time All-AFL Team. Philbin and UB's Willie Ross were the first two UB graduates to play on professional football championship teams in the United States: Ross with the 1964 AFL Champion Buffalo Bills; and Philbin with the 1968 AFL Champion New York Jets, who also won that season's AFL-NFL World Championship Game (Super Bowl III). James Starks was on the Green Bay Packers Super Bowl XLV champions as a rookie. Ramon Guzman played on the 2009 Grey Cup champion Montreal Alouettes.

Khalil Mack was selected as the first-round fifth pick in the NFL draft, becoming the first UB football player to be selected in the first round of the NFL draft. In his time at Buffalo, Mack became the all-time NCAA record for forced fumbles and is also tied for most career tackles for loss in NCAA history.

The 2020 season saw Buffalo ranked in the AP Poll for the first time in program history led by running back Jaret Patterson en route to an undefeated regular season.

== Notable alumni and faculty ==
UB has over 273,000 alumni who live in over 150 countries. Among the individuals who have attended, graduated, or taught at the university are:

- Soumya Raychaudhuri, physician-scientist, rheumatologist, and Timothy P. and Keli B. Walbert Professor of Medicine and Biomedical informatics at Harvard Medical School, and an Institute Member at Broad Institute.
- Deborah Chung, materials scientist, SUNY Distinguished Professor, and Fellow of American Academy of Arts and Sciences
- Biomedical engineering professor Leslie Ying
- NASA astronauts Gregory Jarvis and Ellen S. Baker
- Emmy-winning American journalist Wolf Blitzer
- actor Winston Duke
- dancer Roberto Villanueva
- chairman and former CEO of A+E Networks Abbe Raven
- founder of Miramax and The Weinstein Company, Harvey Weinstein
- CEO of Paramount Pictures Brad Grey
- billionaire, founder, chairman, and CEO of Baidu Robin Li
- CEO of Intel Bob Swan
- Pulitzer Prize winner Tom Toles
- Nobel Prize winners Ronald Coase, Herbert A. Hauptman and Sir John Carew Eccles
- winners of the National Medal of Technology and Innovation, Norman McCombs, Wilson Greatbach, and Erich Bloch
- billionaire and owner of the Boston Bruins, Jeremy Jacobs
- television and film director, Robert Lieberman
- William Matthew London, Professor of public health and consumer advocate
- physicist Mendel Sachs
- musician and civil rights activist Charles Mingus
- pianist and composer Richard Aaker Trythall
- cartoonist Fred Hembeck
- scholar of medieval religion Carolyn Muessig
- composer Margaret Scoville
- creator of the BitTorrent peer-to-peer client Bram Cohen
- National Public Radio personalities Terry Gross and Ira Flatow
- actor, director, and producer Ron Silver
- Academy Award-winning sound engineer Thomas Curley
- physician Mary Blair Moody, the first woman to earn a medical degree from the school
- painter Martha Visser't Hooft taught at the university from 1956 to 1958.
- Avant-garde 20th-century composer Morton Feldman taught in the music department from 1973 until shortly before his death in 1987. His wife, Barbara Monk Feldman is also a graduate of UB.
- Michel Foucault taught in the French department in 1970 and 1972.
- director of the Food and Drug Administration's Center for Tobacco Products (CTP) Brian King

Among the athletes who have graduated from the university are:

- soccer player Bobby Shuttleworth
- football players Gerry Philbin, Naaman Roosevelt, Branden Oliver, Khalil Mack and James Starks

Over the years, the University at Buffalo has also been particularly distinguished in contemporary creative writing. Noted novelists who have taught on its faculty include:

- John Barth
- Raymond Federman
- Anthony Burgess
- J. M. Coetzee

Noted faculty poets include:

- George Starbuck (1983 Lenore Marshall Prize)
- Charles Olson
- Robert Creeley (Bollingen Prize 1999)
- John Logan (Lenore Marshall Prize 1982)
- Irving Feldman (MacArthur Foundation Fellow 1992)
- Carl Dennis (2000 Ruth Lilly Poetry Prize; 2002 Pulitzer Prize for Poetry)
- Robert Hass (Poet Laureate of the United States 1995–97, 2007 National Book Award, 2008 Pulitzer Prize for Poetry)
- Charles Bernstein (co-founder of the university's notable Poetics Program, Bollingen Prize, 2019)
- Steve McCaffery
- Myung Mi Kim
- Susan Howe (Bollingen Prize 2011)

Former UB students include:

- Michael Casey (Yale Younger Poets Award)
- Tony Petrosky (Walt Whitman Award)
- Donald Revell (2004 Lenore Marshall Prize)
- Charles Baxter
- Michael Davidson
- Jonas Zdanys
- from the Poetics Program, Elizabeth Willis, Peter Gizzi, Juliana Spahr, and Jena Osman

Political leaders who have attended and taught at the university include:

- Mohamed Abdullahi Mohamed, the ninth president and 21st prime minister of Somalia
- Zhou Ji, Minister of Education of the People's Republic of China
- Palanivel Thiagarajan, Minister for Finance & Human Resources Management for the state of Tamil Nadu, India

Alumni have also served in the United States House of Representatives, including:

- Jack Quinn
- William F. Walsh

Other lawmakers, such as New York State Assembly member Joseph Giglio and United States Attorney Dennis Vacco, are also graduates.

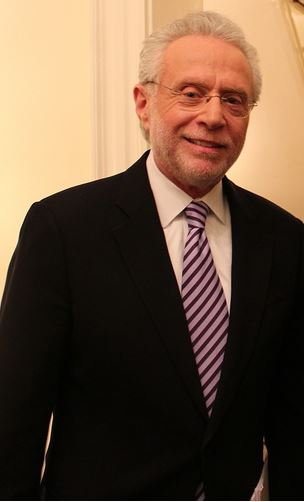
Journalist and CNN reporter, Wolf Blitzer (1970)

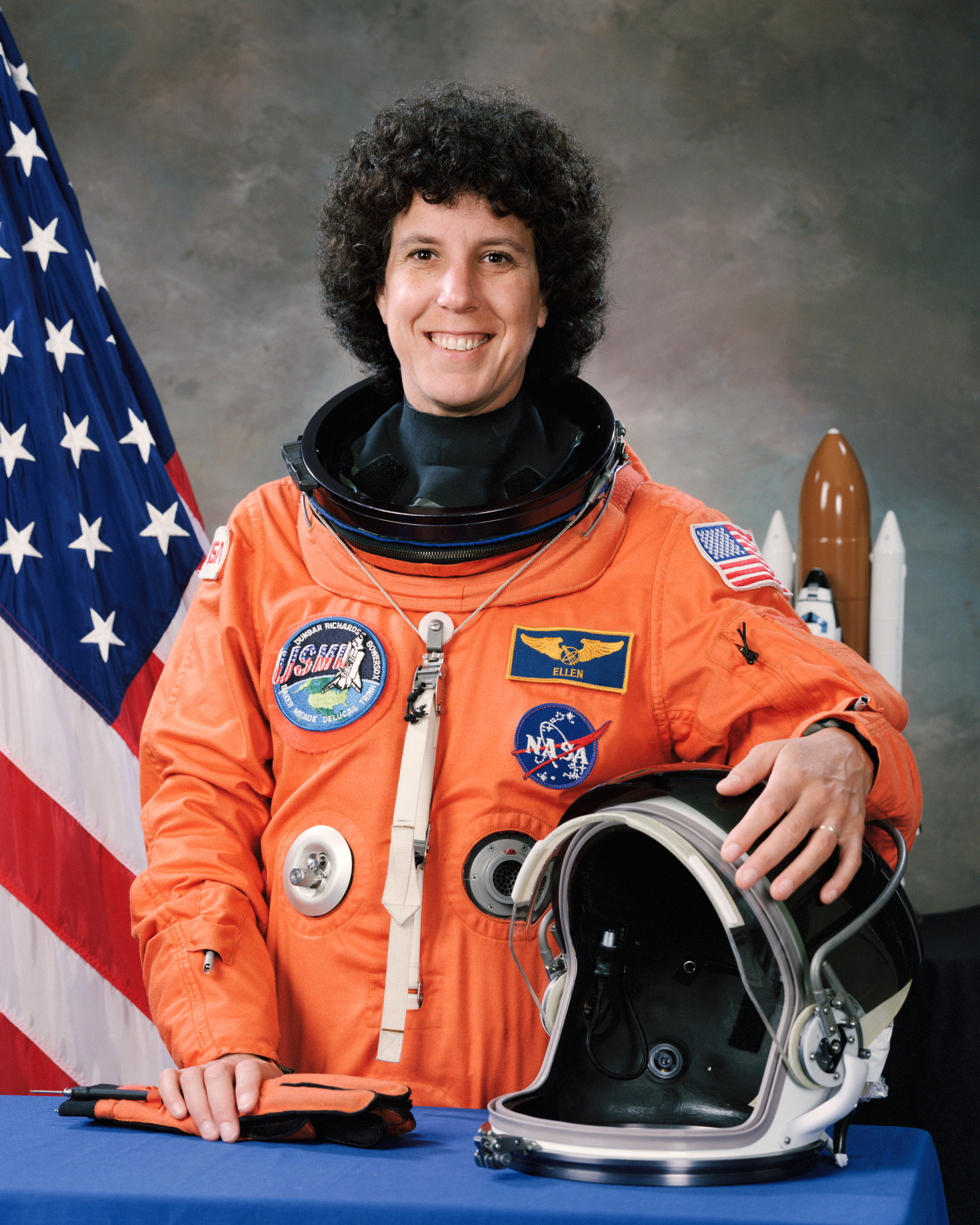
Physician and NASA astronaut, Ellen S. Baker (1974)

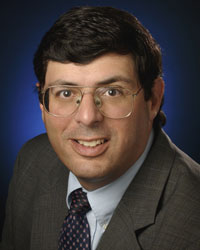
Director of the National Reconnaissance Office, Christopher Scolese (1978)

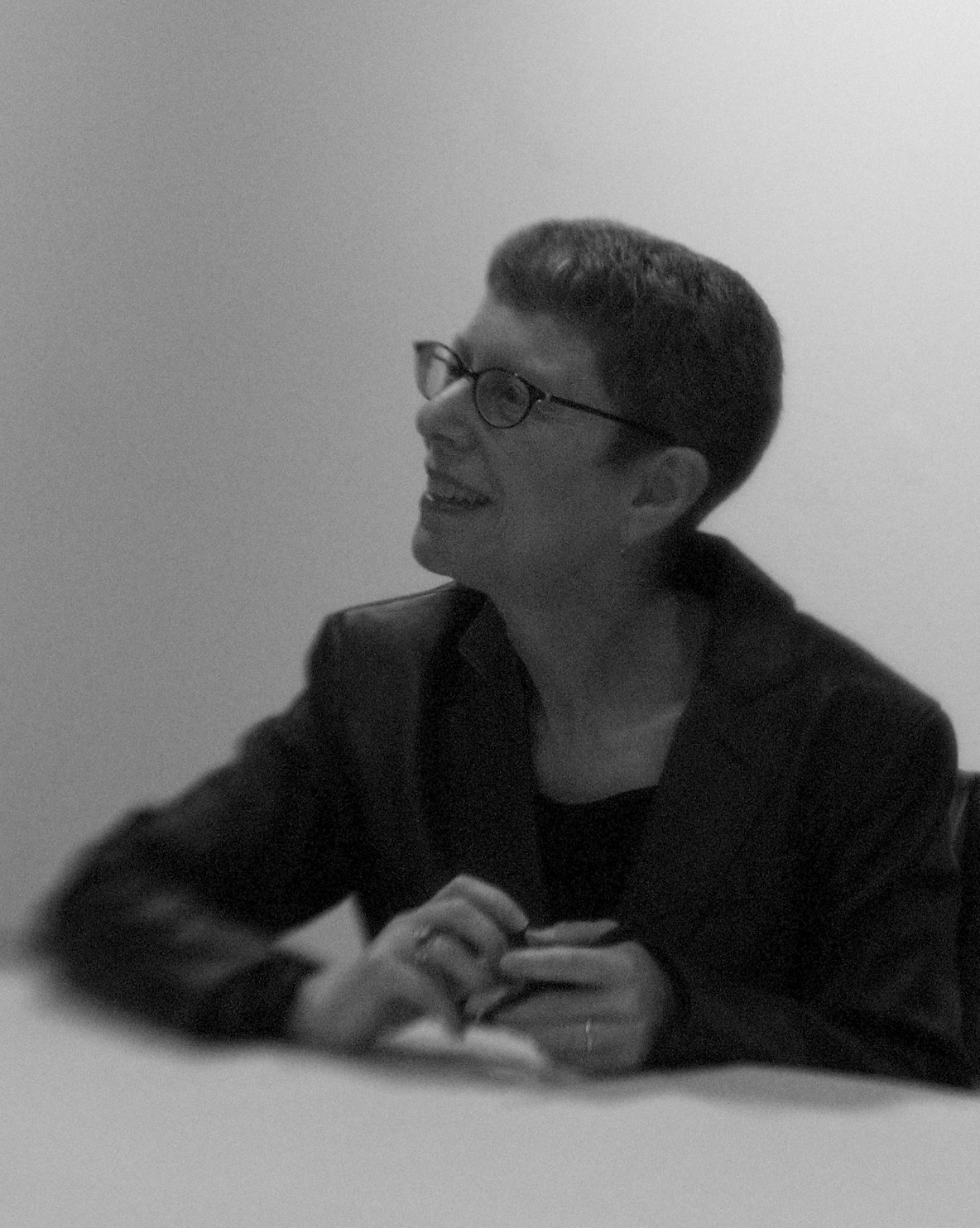
Host and co-executive producer of NPR's Fresh Air, Terry Gross (1972)

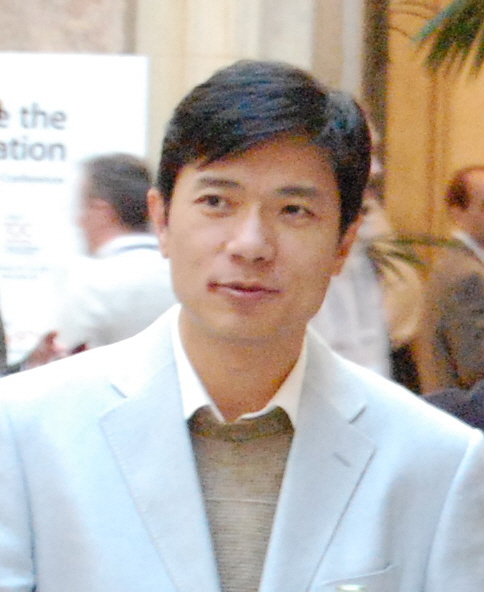
Founder of Chinese technology company Baidu, Robin Li (1994)
