= 1902 Dartmouth football team =

American college football season

1902 Dartmouth football
- Conference: Independent
- Record: 6–2–1
- Head coach: Walter McCornack (2nd season)
- Captain: Victor M. Place
- Home stadium: Alumni Oval

1902 Eastern college football independents records
	Conf.			Overall
Team	W	L	T	W		L		T
Ursinus		–		9	–	0	–	0
Yale		–		11	–	0	–	1
Geneva		–		7	–	0	–	0
Harvard		–		11	–	1	–	0
Princeton		–		8	–	1	–	0
Army		–		6	–	1	–	1
Franklin & Marshall		–		7	–	2	–	0
Dartmouth		–		6	–	2	–	1
Holy Cross		–		6	–	2	–	1
Syracuse		–		6	–	2	–	1
Carlisle		–		8	–	3	–	0
Cornell		–		8	–	3	–	0
Lafayette		–		8	–	3	–	0
Amherst		–		7	–	3	–	0
Penn State		–		7	–	3	–	0
Penn		–		9	–	4	–	0
Lehigh		–		7	–	3	–	1
Vermont		–		5	–	3	–	2
Colgate		–		5	–	3	–	1
NYU		–		5	–	3	–	0
Bucknell		–		6	–	4	–	0
Washington & Jefferson		–		6	–	4	–	0
Columbia		–		6	–	4	–	1
Springfield Training School		–		3	–	2	–	1
Villanova		–		4	–	3	–	0
Brown		–		5	–	4	–	1
Swarthmore		–		6	–	6	–	0
Western U. of Penn.		–		5	–	6	–	1
New Hampshire		–		2	–	3	–	1
Buffalo		–		3	–	5	–	1
Tufts		–		4	–	6	–	1
Dickinson		–		4	–	6	–	0
Fordham		–		2	–	4	–	1
Wesleyan		–		3	–	6	–	1
Rutgers		–		3	–	7	–	0
Navy		–		2	–	7	–	1
Drexel		–		1	–	4	–	1
Temple		–		1	–	4	–	1
Pittsburgh College		–		1	–	6	–	0
Boston College		–		0	–	8	–	0

The 1902 Dartmouth football team was an American football team that represented Dartmouth College as an independent during the 1902 college football season. In its second and final season under head coach Walter McCornack, the team compiled a 6–2–1 record, shut out five of nine opponents, and outscored opponents by a total of 105 to 39. Victor M. Place was the team captain. The team played its home games at Alumni Oval in Hanover, New Hampshire.

== Schedule ==
Date	Opponent	Site	Result	Attendance	Source
October 4	Vermont	Alumni Oval; Hanover, NH	W 11–0		
October 8	Massachusetts	Alumni Oval; Hanover, NH	T 0–0		
October 11	Tufts	Alumni Oval; Hanover, NH	W 29–0		
October 15	at Williams	Weston Field; Williamstown, MA	W 18–0		
October 25	Amherst	Pratt Field; Amherst, MA	L 6–12		
November 1	at Wesleyan	Andrus Field; Middletown, CT	W 12–5		
November 8	Springfield Training School	Alumni Oval; Hanover, NH	W 11–0		
November 22	at Harvard	Soldiers' Field; Boston, MA (rivalry)	L 6–16	10,000	
November 29	vs. Brown	Varick Park; Manchester, NH	W 12–6		
