= 1902 Geneva Covenanters football team =

American college football season

1902 Geneva Covenanters football
- Conference: Independent
- Record: 7–0
- Head coach: Samuel G. Craig (3rd season)
- Captain: Joseph H. Thompson

1902 Eastern college football independents records
	Conf.			Overall
Team	W	L	T	W		L		T
Ursinus		–		9	–	0	–	0
Yale		–		11	–	0	–	1
Geneva		–		7	–	0	–	0
Harvard		–		11	–	1	–	0
Princeton		–		8	–	1	–	0
Army		–		6	–	1	–	1
Franklin & Marshall		–		7	–	2	–	0
Dartmouth		–		6	–	2	–	1
Holy Cross		–		6	–	2	–	1
Syracuse		–		6	–	2	–	1
Carlisle		–		8	–	3	–	0
Cornell		–		8	–	3	–	0
Lafayette		–		8	–	3	–	0
Amherst		–		7	–	3	–	0
Penn State		–		7	–	3	–	0
Penn		–		9	–	4	–	0
Lehigh		–		7	–	3	–	1
Vermont		–		5	–	3	–	2
Colgate		–		5	–	3	–	1
NYU		–		5	–	3	–	0
Bucknell		–		6	–	4	–	0
Washington & Jefferson		–		6	–	4	–	0
Columbia		–		6	–	4	–	1
Springfield Training School		–		3	–	2	–	1
Villanova		–		4	–	3	–	0
Brown		–		5	–	4	–	1
Swarthmore		–		6	–	6	–	0
Western U. of Penn.		–		5	–	6	–	1
New Hampshire		–		2	–	3	–	1
Buffalo		–		3	–	5	–	1
Tufts		–		4	–	6	–	1
Dickinson		–		4	–	6	–	0
Fordham		–		2	–	4	–	1
Wesleyan		–		3	–	6	–	1
Rutgers		–		3	–	7	–	0
Navy		–		2	–	7	–	1
Drexel		–		1	–	4	–	1
Temple		–		1	–	4	–	1
Pittsburgh College		–		1	–	6	–	0
Boston College		–		0	–	8	–	0

he 1902 Geneva Covenanters football team was an American football team that represented Geneva College as an independent during the 1902 college football season. Led by third-year head coach Samuel G. Craig, the team compiled a record of 7–0, achieving Geneva's first undefeated season.

== Schedule ==
Date	Opponent	Site	Result	Attendance	Source
October 4	Pittsburgh College	Beaver Falls, PA	W 17–0		
October 11	at Marietta	Marietta, OH	W 17–0		
October 18	Allegheny	Beaver Falls, PA	W 49–0	700	
October 29	at Western University of Pennsylvania	Colosseum; Pittsburgh, PA	W 22–2		
November 1	at Westminster (PA)	New Wilmington, PA	W 23–0		
November 8	at Allegheny	Meadville, PA	W 16–0		
November 15	Western University of Pennsylvania	Beaver Falls, PA	W 30–0	2,000	
