= 1902 Syracuse Orangemen football team =

American college football season

1902 Syracuse Orangemen football
- Conference: Independent
- Record: 6–2–1
- Head coach: Edwin Sweetland (3rd season)
- Captain: Ancil D. Brown
- Home stadium: Old Oval

1902 Eastern college football independents records
	Conf.			Overall
Team	W	L	T	W		L		T
Ursinus		–		9	–	0	–	0
Yale		–		11	–	0	–	1
Geneva		–		7	–	0	–	0
Harvard		–		11	–	1	–	0
Princeton		–		8	–	1	–	0
Army		–		6	–	1	–	1
Franklin & Marshall		–		7	–	2	–	0
Dartmouth		–		6	–	2	–	1
Holy Cross		–		6	–	2	–	1
Syracuse		–		6	–	2	–	1
Carlisle		–		8	–	3	–	0
Cornell		–		8	–	3	–	0
Lafayette		–		8	–	3	–	0
Amherst		–		7	–	3	–	0
Penn State		–		7	–	3	–	0
Penn		–		9	–	4	–	0
Lehigh		–		7	–	3	–	1
Vermont		–		5	–	3	–	2
Colgate		–		5	–	3	–	1
NYU		–		5	–	3	–	0
Bucknell		–		6	–	4	–	0
Washington & Jefferson		–		6	–	4	–	0
Columbia		–		6	–	4	–	1
Springfield Training School		–		3	–	2	–	1
Villanova		–		4	–	3	–	0
Brown		–		5	–	4	–	1
Swarthmore		–		6	–	6	–	0
Western U. of Penn.		–		5	–	6	–	1
New Hampshire		–		2	–	3	–	1
Buffalo		–		3	–	5	–	1
Tufts		–		4	–	6	–	1
Dickinson		–		4	–	6	–	0
Fordham		–		2	–	4	–	1
Wesleyan		–		3	–	6	–	1
Rutgers		–		3	–	7	–	0
Navy		–		2	–	7	–	1
Drexel		–		1	–	4	–	1
Temple		–		1	–	4	–	1
Pittsburgh College		–		1	–	6	–	0
Boston College		–		0	–	8	–	0

The 1902 Syracuse Orangemen football team represented Syracuse University as an independent during the 1902 college football season. The head coach was Edwin Sweetland, coaching his third season with the Orangemen.

== Schedule ==
Date	Opponent	Site	Result	Attendance	Source
September 20	Cortland	Syracuse, NY	W 21–0		
September 27	Onondaga Indians	Syracuse, NY	W 34–0		
October 4	Clarkson	Syracuse, NY	W 34–0		
October 11	Colgate	Syracuse, NY (rivalry)	W 23–0	3,000	
October 18	Amherst	Syracuse, NY	W 15–0		
October 25	at Yale	Yale Field; New Haven, CT	L 0–24		
November 1	Williams	Syracuse, NY	W 26–17		
November 15	at Army	The Plain; West Point, NY	L 0–46		
November 27	at Columbia	Polo Grounds; New York, NY	T 6–6	4,000	
