= 1902 Rutgers Queensmen football team =

American college football season

1902 Rutgers Queensmen football
- Conference: Independent
- Record: 3–7
- Head coach: Henry Van Hoevenberg (1st season)
- Captain: Alfred Ellet Hitchner
- Home stadium: Neilson Field

1902 Eastern college football independents records
| | Conf. | | | Overall |
| Team | W | L | T | W | | L | | T |
|---|---|---|---|---|---|---|---|---|
| Ursinus | | – | | 9 | – | 0 | – | 0 |
| Yale | | – | | 11 | – | 0 | – | 1 |
| Geneva | | – | | 7 | – | 0 | – | 0 |
| Harvard | | – | | 11 | – | 1 | – | 0 |
| Princeton | | – | | 8 | – | 1 | – | 0 |
| Army | | – | | 6 | – | 1 | – | 1 |
| Franklin & Marshall | | – | | 7 | – | 2 | – | 0 |
| Dartmouth | | – | | 6 | – | 2 | – | 1 |
| Holy Cross | | – | | 6 | – | 2 | – | 1 |
| Syracuse | | – | | 6 | – | 2 | – | 1 |
| Carlisle | | – | | 8 | – | 3 | – | 0 |
| Cornell | | – | | 8 | – | 3 | – | 0 |
| Lafayette | | – | | 8 | – | 3 | – | 0 |
| Amherst | | – | | 7 | – | 3 | – | 0 |
| Penn State | | – | | 7 | – | 3 | – | 0 |
| Penn | | – | | 9 | – | 4 | – | 0 |
| Lehigh | | – | | 7 | – | 3 | – | 1 |
| Vermont | | – | | 5 | – | 3 | – | 2 |
| Colgate | | – | | 5 | – | 3 | – | 1 |
| NYU | | – | | 5 | – | 3 | – | 0 |
| Bucknell | | – | | 6 | – | 4 | – | 0 |
| Washington & Jefferson | | – | | 6 | – | 4 | – | 0 |
| Columbia | | – | | 6 | – | 4 | – | 1 |
| Springfield Training School | | – | | 3 | – | 2 | – | 1 |
| Villanova | | – | | 4 | – | 3 | – | 0 |
| Brown | | – | | 5 | – | 4 | – | 1 |
| Swarthmore | | – | | 6 | – | 6 | – | 0 |
| Western U. of Penn. | | – | | 5 | – | 6 | – | 1 |
| New Hampshire | | – | | 2 | – | 3 | – | 1 |
| Buffalo | | – | | 3 | – | 5 | – | 1 |
| Tufts | | – | | 4 | – | 6 | – | 1 |
| Dickinson | | – | | 4 | – | 6 | – | 0 |
| Fordham | | – | | 2 | – | 4 | – | 1 |
| Wesleyan | | – | | 3 | – | 6 | – | 1 |
| Rutgers | | – | | 3 | – | 7 | – | 0 |
| Navy | | – | | 2 | – | 7 | – | 1 |
| Drexel | | – | | 1 | – | 4 | – | 1 |
| Temple | | – | | 1 | – | 4 | – | 1 |
| Pittsburgh College | | – | | 1 | – | 6 | – | 0 |
| Boston College | | – | | 0 | – | 8 | – | 0 |

The 1902 Rutgers Queensmen football team represented Rutgers University as an independent during the 1902 college football season. In their first and only season under head coach Henry Van Hoevenberg, the Queensmen compiled a 3–7 record and were outscored by their opponents, 188 to 42. The team captain was Alfred Ellet Hitchner.

== Schedule ==
| Date | Opponent | Site | Result | Source |
|---|---|---|---|---|
| September 27 | at Manhattan College | Jasper Oval; Bronx, NY | L 0–6 | |
| October 5 | Columbia | Neilson Field; New Brunswick, NJ | L 0–43 | |
| October 11 | at Lehigh | South Bethlehem, PA | L 0–34 | |
| October 18 | Ursinus | Neilson Field; New Brunswick, NJ | L 0–16 | |
| October 22 | Swarthmore | Neilson Field; New Brunswick, NJ | L 6–12 | |
| October 25 | at Haverford | Walton Field; Haverford, PA | L 5–43 | |
| November 1 | at Stevens | Hoboken, NJ | W 10–0 | |
| November 8 | at NYU | Ohio Field; Bronx, NY | L 0–22 | |
| November 15 | Delaware | Neilson Field; New Brunswick, NJ | W 15–12 | |
| November 22 | Stevens | Neilson Field; New Brunswick, NJ | W 6–0 | |
