= 1902 Lafayette football team =

American college football season

1902 Lafayette football
- Conference: Independent
- Record: 8–3
- Head coach: Dave Fultz (1st season)
- Captain: Harry Trout
- Home stadium: March Field

1902 Eastern college football independents records
	Conf.			Overall
Team	W	L	T	W		L		T
Ursinus		–		9	–	0	–	0
Yale		–		11	–	0	–	1
Geneva		–		7	–	0	–	0
Harvard		–		11	–	1	–	0
Princeton		–		8	–	1	–	0
Army		–		6	–	1	–	1
Franklin & Marshall		–		7	–	2	–	0
Dartmouth		–		6	–	2	–	1
Holy Cross		–		6	–	2	–	1
Syracuse		–		6	–	2	–	1
Carlisle		–		8	–	3	–	0
Cornell		–		8	–	3	–	0
Lafayette		–		8	–	3	–	0
Amherst		–		7	–	3	–	0
Penn State		–		7	–	3	–	0
Penn		–		9	–	4	–	0
Lehigh		–		7	–	3	–	1
Vermont		–		5	–	3	–	2
Colgate		–		5	–	3	–	1
NYU		–		5	–	3	–	0
Bucknell		–		6	–	4	–	0
Washington & Jefferson		–		6	–	4	–	0
Columbia		–		6	–	4	–	1
Springfield Training School		–		3	–	2	–	1
Villanova		–		4	–	3	–	0
Brown		–		5	–	4	–	1
Swarthmore		–		6	–	6	–	0
Western U. of Penn.		–		5	–	6	–	1
New Hampshire		–		2	–	3	–	1
Buffalo		–		3	–	5	–	1
Tufts		–		4	–	6	–	1
Dickinson		–		4	–	6	–	0
Fordham		–		2	–	4	–	1
Wesleyan		–		3	–	6	–	1
Rutgers		–		3	–	7	–	0
Navy		–		2	–	7	–	1
Drexel		–		1	–	4	–	1
Temple		–		1	–	4	–	1
Pittsburgh College		–		1	–	6	–	0
Boston College		–		0	–	8	–	0

The 1902 Lafayette football team was an American football team that represented Lafayette College as an independent during the 1902 college football season. In its first season and only season under head coach Dave Fultz, the team compiled an 8–3 record. Harry Trout was the team captain. The team played its home games at March Field in Easton, Pennsylvania.

== Schedule ==
Date	Opponent	Site	Result	Attendance	Source
September 27	Gallaudet	Easton, PA	W 23–0		
October 4	Susquehanna	Easton, PA	W 53–0		
October 8	Gettysburg	Easton, PA	W 14–0		
October 14	at Washington & Jefferson	College Park; Washington, PA	W 12–0	3,000	
October 18	Manhattan	Easton, PA	W 38–5		
October 28	at Georgetown	Georgetown Field; Washington, DC	W 23–0		
November 1	Brown	Easton, PA	W 6–5		
November 8	at Navy	Worden Field; Annapolis, MD	L 11–12		
November 15	at Cornell	Percy Field; Ithaca, NY	L 0–28		
November 22	Lehigh	Easton, PA (rivalry)	L 0–6		
November 27	Dickinson	Easton, PA	W 23–0		
