= 1902 Harvard Crimson football team =

American college football season

1902 Harvard Crimson football
- Conference: Independent
- Record: 11–1
- Head coach: John Wells Farley (1st season)
- Home stadium: Soldiers' Field

1902 Eastern college football independents records
	Conf.			Overall
Team	W	L	T	W		L		T
Ursinus		–		9	–	0	–	0
Yale		–		11	–	0	–	1
Geneva		–		7	–	0	–	0
Harvard		–		11	–	1	–	0
Princeton		–		8	–	1	–	0
Army		–		6	–	1	–	1
Frankin & Marshall		–		7	–	2	–	0
Dartmouth		–		6	–	2	–	1
Holy Cross		–		6	–	2	–	1
Syracuse		–		6	–	2	–	1
Carlisle		–		8	–	3	–	0
Cornell		–		8	–	3	–	0
Lafayette		–		8	–	3	–	0
Amherst		–		7	–	3	–	0
Penn State		–		7	–	3	–	0
Penn		–		9	–	4	–	0
Lehigh		–		7	–	3	–	1
Vermont		–		5	–	3	–	2
Colgate		–		5	–	3	–	1
NYU		–		5	–	3	–	0
Bucknell		–		6	–	4	–	0
Washington & Jefferson		–		6	–	4	–	0
Columbia		–		6	–	4	–	1
Springfield Training School		–		3	–	2	–	1
Villanova		–		4	–	3	–	0
Brown		–		5	–	4	–	1
Swarthmore		–		6	–	6	–	0
Western U. of Penn.		–		5	–	6	–	1
New Hampshire		–		2	–	3	–	1
Buffalo		–		3	–	5	–	1
Tufts		–		4	–	6	–	1
Dickinson		–		4	–	6	–	0
Fordham		–		2	–	4	–	1
Wesleyan		–		3	–	6	–	1
Rutgers		–		3	–	7	–	0
Navy		–		2	–	7	–	1
Drexel		–		1	–	4	–	1
Temple		–		1	–	4	–	1
Pittsburgh College		–		1	–	6	–	0
Boston College		–		0	–	8	–	0

The 1902 Harvard Crimson football team represented Harvard University in the 1902 college football season. The Crimson finished with an 11–1 record under first-year head coach John Wells Farley. The 1902 team won its first eleven games by a combined 184–23 score. It then closed the season with a 23–0 loss against rival Yale. Walter Camp selected two Harvard players as first-team selections to his 1902 College Football All-America Team. They were end Edward Bowditch and fullback Thomas Graydon.

== Schedule ==
Date	Opponent	Site	Result	Attendance	Source
September 27	Williams	Soldiers' Field; Boston, MA	W 11–0	1,500	
October 1	Bowdoin	Soldiers' Field; Boston, MA	W 17–6	500	
October 4	Bates	Soldiers' Field; Boston, MA	W 23–0	4,500–5,000	
October 8	Amherst	Soldiers' Field; Boston, MA	W 6–0	4,000	
October 11	Maine	Soldiers' Field; Boston, MA	W 22–0	> 5,000	
October 15	Wesleyan	Soldiers' Field; Boston, MA	W 35–5	5,000	
October 18	at Army	The Plain; West Point, NY	W 14–6		
October 25	Brown	Soldiers' Field; Boston, MA	W 6–0	>20,000	
November 1	Carlisle	Soldiers' Field; Boston, MA	W 23–0	16,000	
November 8	Penn	Soldiers' Field; Boston, MA (rivalry)	W 11–0	> 16,000	
November 15	Dartmouth	Soldiers' Field; Boston, MA (rivalry)	W 16–6	10,000	
November 22	at Yale	Yale Field; New Haven, CT (rivalry)	L 0–23	30,000	
