= 1902 Vermont Green and Gold football team =

American college football season

1902 Vermont Green and Gold football
- Conference: Independent
- Record: 5–3–2
- Head coach: Harry Howard Cloudman (1st season)
- Home stadium: Athletic Park

1902 Eastern college football independents records
	Conf.			Overall
Team	W	L	T	W		L		T
Ursinus		–		9	–	0	–	0
Yale		–		11	–	0	–	1
Geneva		–		7	–	0	–	0
Harvard		–		11	–	1	–	0
Princeton		–		8	–	1	–	0
Army		–		6	–	1	–	1
Franklin & Marshall		–		7	–	2	–	0
Dartmouth		–		6	–	2	–	1
Holy Cross		–		6	–	2	–	1
Syracuse		–		6	–	2	–	1
Carlisle		–		8	–	3	–	0
Cornell		–		8	–	3	–	0
Lafayette		–		8	–	3	–	0
Amherst		–		7	–	3	–	0
Penn State		–		7	–	3	–	0
Penn		–		9	–	4	–	0
Lehigh		–		7	–	3	–	1
Vermont		–		5	–	3	–	2
Colgate		–		5	–	3	–	1
NYU		–		5	–	3	–	0
Bucknell		–		6	–	4	–	0
Washington & Jefferson		–		6	–	4	–	0
Columbia		–		6	–	4	–	1
Springfield Training School		–		3	–	2	–	1
Villanova		–		4	–	3	–	0
Brown		–		5	–	4	–	1
Swarthmore		–		6	–	6	–	0
Western U. of Penn.		–		5	–	6	–	1
New Hampshire		–		2	–	3	–	1
Buffalo		–		3	–	5	–	1
Tufts		–		4	–	6	–	1
Dickinson		–		4	–	6	–	0
Fordham		–		2	–	4	–	1
Wesleyan		–		3	–	6	–	1
Rutgers		–		3	–	7	–	0
Navy		–		2	–	7	–	1
Drexel		–		1	–	4	–	1
Temple		–		1	–	4	–	1
Pittsburgh College		–		1	–	6	–	0
Boston College		–		0	–	8	–	0

The 1902 Vermont Green and Gold football team was an American football team that represented the University of Vermont as an independent during the 1902 college football season. In their first year under head coach Harry Howard Cloudman, the team compiled a 5–3–2 record.

== Schedule ==
Date	Opponent	Site	Result	Source
September 27	Montpelier Seminary	Athletic Park; Burlington, VT	W 54–0	
October 1	at Brown	Andrews Field; Providence, RI	T 0–0	
October 4	at Dartmouth	Alumni Oval; Hanover, NH	L 0–11	
October 15	at Yale	Yale Field; New Haven, CT	L 0–32	
October 18	St. Lawrence	Athletic Park; Burlington, VT	W 16–0	
October 22	at Williams	Williamstown, MA	T 5–5	
October 25	at Holy Cross	Worcester College Grounds; Worcester, MA	L 5–11	
November 1	RPI	Athletic Park; Burlington, VT	W 11–6	
November 8	at Wesleyan	Andrus Field; Middletown, MA	W 5–0	
November 15	Union (NY)	Athletic Park; Burlington, VT	W 29–0	
