= 1902 Western University of Pennsylvania football team =

American college football season

1902 Western University of Pennsylvania football
- Conference: Independent
- Record: 4–6–1
- Head coach: Fred Crolius (1st season)
- Home stadium: Colosseum

1902 Eastern college football independents records
	Conf.			Overall
Team	W	L	T	W		L		T
Ursinus		–		9	–	0	–	0
Yale		–		11	–	0	–	1
Geneva		–		7	–	0	–	0
Harvard		–		11	–	1	–	0
Princeton		–		8	–	1	–	0
Army		–		6	–	1	–	1
Franklin & Marshall		–		7	–	2	–	0
Dartmouth		–		6	–	2	–	1
Holy Cross		–		6	–	2	–	1
Syracuse		–		6	–	2	–	1
Carlisle		–		8	–	3	–	0
Cornell		–		8	–	3	–	0
Lafayette		–		8	–	3	–	0
Amherst		–		7	–	3	–	0
Penn State		–		7	–	3	–	0
Penn		–		9	–	4	–	0
Lehigh		–		7	–	3	–	1
Vermont		–		5	–	3	–	2
Colgate		–		5	–	3	–	1
NYU		–		5	–	3	–	0
Bucknell		–		6	–	4	–	0
Washington & Jefferson		–		6	–	4	–	0
Columbia		–		6	–	4	–	1
Springfield Training School		–		3	–	2	–	1
Villanova		–		4	–	3	–	0
Brown		–		5	–	4	–	1
Swarthmore		–		6	–	6	–	0
Western U. of Penn.		–		5	–	6	–	1
New Hampshire		–		2	–	3	–	1
Buffalo		–		3	–	5	–	1
Tufts		–		4	–	6	–	1
Dickinson		–		4	–	6	–	0
Fordham		–		2	–	4	–	1
Wesleyan		–		3	–	6	–	1
Rutgers		–		3	–	7	–	0
Navy		–		2	–	7	–	1
Drexel		–		1	–	4	–	1
Temple		–		1	–	4	–	1
Pittsburgh College		–		1	–	6	–	0
Boston College		–		0	–	8	–	0

The 1902 Western University of Pennsylvania football team was an American football team that represented Western University of Pennsylvania (now known as the University of Pittsburgh) as an independent during the 1902 college football season. The Pitt Football Record Book refers to a 24–0 victory over Bucknell. However, contemporary press coverage indicates that the game was played between Bucknell and the Pittsburgh Stars.

== Schedule ==
Date	Opponent	Site	Result	Attendance	Source
September 20	Allegheny Athletic Association	Pittsburgh, PA	L 5–15		
September 27	at Penn State	Bellefonte, PA (rivalry)	L 0–27		
October 4	at Pittsburgh Stars	Greensburg, PA	game cancelled		
October 8	Grove City	Colosseum; Pittsburgh, PA	W 16–0	400	
October 15	Westminster (PA)	Colosseum; Pittsburgh, PA	T 6–6		
October 22	West Virginia	Colosseum; Pittsburgh, PA (rivalry)	L 6–23		
October 29	Geneva	Colosseum; Pittsburgh, PA	L 2–22		
November 5	Philadelphia Professional team	Colosseum; Pittsburgh, PA	game cancelled		
November 8	Ohio	Colosseum; Pittsburgh, PA	W 34–0	500	
November 12	Allegheny	Colosseum; Pittsburgh, PA	L 0–6		
November 15	at Geneva	Beaver Falls, PA	L 0–30	2,000	
November 19	Waynesburg	Colosseum; Pittsburgh, PA	game cancelled		
November 19	Allegheny Athletic Club	Colosseum; Pittsburgh, PA	W 29–0		
November 22	Mount Union	Colosseum; Pittsburgh, PA	W 6–0	100	
November 27	at West Virginia	Morgantown, WV	game cancelled		

== Season recap ==
After the successful 1901 season, the Western University of Pennsylvania returned to the part-time borrowed coach routine of the past seasons. The Athletic Association convinced Frederick J. Crolius to coach the team. Mr. Crolius was highly qualified for the position after having played college ball at Dartmouth and spending the 1901 season as halfback on the Homestead Library and Athletic Club. The problem was that he was also the coach of the Allegheny Athletic Association team and the starting halfback on the Pittsburgh Stars pro team. A lot of the responsibility for the coaching and running of the Western University team would fall on team captain John Martin and assistant coach Parke Bachman. Captain Martin played football two seasons at Geneva College prior to his three years of playing for the Western University. Manager Charles L. Livingston pieced together an ambitious fourteen game schedule. However, the WUPs managed to only play eleven. The eight home games were played at the Colosseum. Box seats with new chairs were installed at the Colosseum on the sidelines with an unobstructed view of the action. As an added incentive box seat holders had their own gate for admission. Students were able to purchase low priced season tickets for the first time. In its first season under head coach Fred Crolius, the team compiled a 4–6–1 record and was outscored by a total of 129 to 104.

== Game summaries ==
=== Allegheny Athletic Association ===
Allegheny AA at WUP

Team	1	2	Total
• Allegheny AA	10	5	15
WUP	5	0	5

- Date: September 20, 1902
- Location: University Grounds
  Pittsburgh, PA
- Referee: Rousseau

On September 20, coach Fred Crolius pitted his two teams against each other in a practice game consisting of two ten minute halves. Since the Colosseum was being renovated, the game was played on the campus grounds. The WUP lineup was weakened by injuries and men being called to military duty. Four minutes after kickoff Briney of the three A's plunged into the end zone for a touchdown. The WUP kicked off again and the A's offense continued to find holes in the WUP defense with Reynolds scoring after another four minutes of play. The offensive onslaught continued on the A's next possession but they fumbled on the three yard line. WUP quarterback Edward Ward recovered and raced the length of the field to score their first and only touchdown. The three A's scored once more to make the final score 15–5. The WUP lineup for the game against the AAA was Carpenter (left end), John Martin (left tackle), John Boyd (left guard), Miller (center), Stagg (right guard), Douglass (right tackle) Paul McClain (right end), Edward Ward (quarterback), Cosler (left halfback), John Edwards (right halfback), and William Secrist (fullback). The game consisted of one ten minute half and one five minute half.

=== At Penn State ===
WUP at Penn State

Team	1	2	Total
WUP	0	0	0
• Penn State	14	13	27

- Date: September 27, 1902
- Location: Beaver Field
  Bellefonte, PA
- Referee: Dr. Robison (Penn State)

The fifth WUP versus State College game mirrored the first four. State College triumphed 27–0. In the first five games of this future great rivalry the Staties outscored the WUP 114–4. The Pittsburgh Daily Post headline was definitely upbeat - "The WUPS do Well at State, Although Crippled They Hold Their Opponents Down Below the Score Made Last Year". Irish Mcllveen scored twice. Carl Forkum, Brit Seeley and Andy Smith each scored once. The WUP defense was porous and the offense could not penetrate the State defense. The referee was ex-WUP coach Dr. Fred Robison. This would be the last WUP versus State game played in State College, Pennsylvania until 1931. The WUP lineup for the game against Penn State was Byron Stroud (left end), Jackson (left tackle), John Boyd (left guard), Stacy Hankey (center), Douglass (right guard), Sweeney (right tackle), Frank Rugh (right end), Carpenter (quarterback), John Martin (left halfback), Paul McClain (right halfback) and William Secrist (fullback). Thomas Hewitt replaced Frank Rugh at right end. The game was played in 20-minute halves.

=== At Pittsburgh Stars ===
On Saturday, October 4, the WUP eleven was scheduled to play the Pittsburg Stars in Greensburg, Pennsylvania. The game was postponed indefinitely due to a muddy playing field.

=== Grove City ===
Grove City at WUP

Team	1	2	Total
Grove City	0	0	0
• WUP	11	5	16

- Date: October 8, 1902
- Location: Colosseum (Recreation Park)
  Pittsburgh, PA
- Game attendance: 400
- Referee: Fulton (State College)

The WUP versus Grove City College football game drew at least 400 fans to the Colosseum in spite of competition from a baseball game at Exposition Park. The fans were not disappointed as the WUP offense moved the ball steadily through the Grove City defense and scored three touchdowns- one by Captain John Martin and two by William Secrist. Frank Rugh converted one goal after. The WUP defense allowed Grove City to get inside their twenty-yard line twice but kept the Crimson out of the end zone. The Crimson coach W.H. Weakley tried to insert himself into the lineup but was quickly ushered to the sideline. The final score was WUP 16 – Grove City 0. The WUP lineup for the game against Grove City was Byron Stroud (left end), Jackson (left tackle), John Boyd (left guard), Stacy Hankey (center), Douglass (right guard), Clyde McGogney (right tackle), Frank Rugh (right end), Carpenter (quarterback), John Martin (left halfback), Paul McClain (right halfback) and William Secrist (fullback). Substitutions during the game were: Marion Edmundson replaced Frank Rugh at right end; Frank Rugh replaced Carpenter at quarterback; and John Kerr replaced William Secrist at fullback. The game was played in 20-minute halves.

=== Westminster ===
Westminster at WUP

Team	1	2	Total
Westminster	6	0	6
WUP	6	0	6

- Date: October 15, 1902
- Location: Colosseum (Recreation Park)
  Pittsburgh, PA
- Referee: Karl Porter (Westminster)

Even with the crowd larger than the Grove City game, the usual pageantry associated with past Westminster versus WUP football tussles was missing for the October 16 match at the Colosseum. However, the antics on the field kept everyone entertained. Initially, there was a disagreement about the length of the halves. The compromise was one thirty minute half and one twenty-five minute half. After alternating possessions, the WUP offense (minus injured halfbacks John Martin and Paul McClain) moved the ball through the Titan defense but could not sustain the drive and were forced to punt. On first down Tennent, Westminster's end, skirted around the WUP defensive left end and raced eighty-eight yards for a touchdown. Wilbur Hockensmith was the umpire. He had blown the play dead for a holding penalty on Christy of the Titans. Westminster refused to accept the penalty and threatened to leave the field. The WUPs caved in to their demands and resumed play. Mr. Hockensmith resigned as umpire and Coach Crolius replaced him. The goal kick after by Moore was successful and Westminster led 6–0. The energized WUP offense drove the ball to the four yard line but Secrist fumbled and Westminster recovered. The WUP defense managed to get the ball back. On this possession Richard Hawkins and Frank Rugh did the bulk of the ball carrying with Rugh finally shoved over the goal line for the score. He also kicked the goal after to tie the game at 6–6. The second half was mainly the WUP offense versus the Titan defense, but the WUPs were unable to penetrate the goal line. The game ended in a 6–6 tie. The WUP lineup for the game against Westminster was Byron Stroud (left end), Jackson (left tackle), John Boyd (left guard), Stacy Hankey (center), Douglass (right guard), John McClymonds (right tackle), Clyde McGogney (right end), Joe McCready (quarterback), Frank Rugh (left halfback), Richard Hawkins (right halfback) and William Secrist (fullback). Substitutions during the game were: John Kerr replaced Douglass at right guard; John Martin replaced Frank Rugh at left halfback; Frank Rugh replaced Joe McCready at quarterback; and Carpenter replaced Frank Rugh at quarterback. The game consisted of one thirty minute half and one twenty-five minute half.

=== West Virginia ===
West Virginia at WUP

Team	1	2	Total
• West Virginia	11	12	23
WUP	0	6	6

- Date: October 22, 1902
- Location: Colosseum (Recreation Park)
  Pittsburgh, PA
- Referee: E.P. Young (Cornell)

On October 22, the fifth edition of the Backyard Brawl took place at the Colosseum. The Mountaineers scored on their first possession, which set the tone for the rest of the game. The Mountaineer offense drove the ball steadily through the WUP defense with halfback Paul Martin carrying the ball over the goal for the touchdown. After a change of possessions, West Virginia secured the ball at midfield and three plays later C.F. Hoy plunged over the goal for their second touchdown. The goal kick after was successful by William Washer. The Mountaineers led 11–0. The WUP defense was able to make a goal line stand at the close of the first half to keep the score 11–0. In the second half the WUP defense could not stop the West Virginia offensive onslaught. C.F. Hoy and Lewis "Bull" Smith scored second half touchdowns for the Mountaineers. Late in the second half, the Mountaineers fumbled on their twenty-six yard line and WUP recovered. Seven plays later John Martin bulled his way into the end zone for the lone WUP touchdown. Frank Rugh kicked the goal after and the final score was 23–6 in favor of the visitors. The WUP lineup for the game against West Virginia was Byron Stroud (left end), G. Jackson (left tackle), John Boyd (left guard), Stacy Hankey (center), Ray Alexander (right guard), John McClymonds (right tackle), William Jackson (right end), Carpenter (quarterback), Frank Rugh (left halfback), Joe McCready (right halfback) and William Secrist (fullback). During the game John Kerr replaced Byron Stroud at left end. The game consisted of thirty minute halves.

=== Geneva ===
Geneva at WUP

Team	1	2	Total
• Geneva	10	12	22
WUP	0	2	2

- Date: October 29, 1902
- Location: Colosseum (Recreation Park)
  Pittsburgh, PA
- Referee: J. A. Pierce (Lafayette)

On October 29, coach J. B. Craig brought his undefeated Geneva Covenanters to the Colosseum to gain some revenge for the 1901 loss to the WUP. Joe Thompson (future WUP star and coach) was the captain of the Covenanters. The WUP lineup was missing starters Paul McLain and Richard Hawkins due to military obligations. The first half was a defensive standstill until the WUP offense gave up the ball on downs on their own twenty-nine yard line. Walter East, Jud Schmitt and Joe Thompson carried the ball to the four yard line with East finally plunging into the end zone for the score. The goal kick after by Schmitt was unsuccessful. The halftime score was 5–0 in favor of Geneva. After the second half kick-off Geneva secured possession and methodically advanced the ball through the WUP defense. Bruce Martin (brother of WUP captain John Martin) scampered the last twenty-three yards for the touchdown. The goal kick after was again unsuccessful. After a change of possessions, J. Jackson, fullback for the Universities, fell on a Geneva fumble at the Geneva twenty-five. The WUP offense bucked through the Geneva defense to the thirteen yard line but turned the ball over on downs. Geneva attempted to punt but Patterson (who had replaced Stoyer at end) blocked the kick into the end zone. A mad scramble ended with Joe Thompson on the ball and everyone else on Mr. Thompson. Referee Brownlee called it a safety and the WUPs were on the scoreboard. Geneva 10-WUP 2. After a change of possessions Joe Thompson raced sixty-seven yards for a touchdown and Edgar kicked the goal after. Then Critchlow of the Covenanters scored on a thirty-two yard romp in the waning moments to bring the final score to 22–2 in favor of Geneva. The WUP lineup for the game against Geneva was Byron Stroud (left end), McChesney (left tackle), Walter Shidler (left guard), Stacy Hankey (center), Douglass (right guard), Andrew Wallgren (right tackle), George Stoyer (right end), Joe McCready (quarterback), John Martin (left halfback), R. Jackson (right halfback) and J. Jackson (fullback). Substitutions during the game were: Frank Rugh replaced Byron Stroud at left end and Guy Patterson replaced George Stroyer at right end. The game consisted of twenty-five minute halves.

=== Philadelphia Professionals ===
The game against the Philadelphia Professionals originally scheduled for November 5 and then changed to the 6th was officially cancelled due to a misunderstanding with the Philadelphia management.

=== Ohio U. ===
Ohio U. at WUP

Team	1	2	Total
Ohio U.	0	0	0
• WUP	17	17	34

- Date: November 8, 1902
- Location: Colosseum (Recreation Park)
  Pittsburgh, PA
- Game attendance: 500
- Referee: J. A. Pierce (Lafayette)

With Paul McLain and Richard Hawkins back from military duty the WUP lineup was again at full strength for the game with the Ohio University Bobcats on November 8 at the Colosseum. The Bobcats were outweighed and simply got pushed all over the field by both the WUP offense and defense. The rejuvenated WUP offense scored five touchdowns – three by William Secrist, one by Richard Hawkins and one by Guy Jackson. The defense scored one on a blocked punt that Bloom fell on in the end zone. Frank Rugh was good on four goal kicks to make the final score WUP 34 – Ohio U. 0. The only negative was place kicker Kerr tried two field goals with no success. The WUP lineup for the game against Ohio University was Guy Patterson (left end), John Martin (left tackle), John Boyd (left guard), Stacy Hankey (center), John Kerr (right guard), McChesney (right tackle), Paul McClain (right end), Joe McCready (quarterback), Richard Hawkins (left halfback), Frank Rugh (right halfback) and William Secrist (fullback). During the game Guy Jackson replaced William Secrist at fullback. The game consisted of twenty-five minute halves.

=== Allegheny ===
Allegheny at WUP

Team	1	2	Total
• Allegheny	0	6	6
WUP	0	0	0

- Date: November 12, 1902
- Location: Colosseum (Recreation Park)
  Pittsburgh, PA
- Referee: J. A. Pierce (Lafayette)

The WUP Manager Charles L. Livingston had a bit of explaining to do for the hour and thirty minute delay in the starting time of the November 12 game with Allegheny College at the Colosseum. The Western University rented the Colosseum from the Pittsburg Stars for one thousand dollars. Two hundred and fifty dollars were paid at the beginning of the season. Two hundred and fifty dollars were due on November 1. Manager Berry of the Pittsburg team said that he locked the gates because he did not receive payment on November 1. Manager Livingston claimed that Mr. Berry had reneged on his promise to have the Philadelphia professional team play the WUP the previous Thursday so he had written a check in the amount of sixty-seven dollars and seventy-five cents to cover the University's loss of revenue. Mr. Livingston was finally able to secure an injunction and the gates were opened at 5 p.m. The game was shortened to one fifteen minute half and one nine minute half. The first half was a defensive struggle and neither team came close to scoring. The WUP offense received the second half kick and on the fifth play from scrimmage they fumbled and Allegheny recovered. Taylor, Allegheny end, raced twenty-eight yards to the WUP ten. The WUP defense dug in but Allegheny fullback Williams bulled into the end zone from the two. Mr. Williams was successful on the kick after and the final score read Allegheny 6 – WUP 0. The WUP lineup for the game against Allegheny was Guy Patterson (left end), John Martin (left tackle), Walter Shidler (left guard), Stacy Hankey (center), John Boyd (right guard), McChesney (right tackle), Paul McClain (right end), Joe McCready (quarterback), Richard Hawkins (left halfback), Frank Rugh (right halfback) and William Secrist (fullback). The game consisted of fifteen minute halves.

=== At Geneva ===
WUP at Geneva

Team	1	2	Total
WUP	0	0	0
• Geneva	18	12	30

- Date: November 15, 1902
- Location: Geneva Grounds
  Beaver Falls, PA
- Game attendance: 2,000
- Referee: Mitchell

On November 15, the WUP eleven traveled to Beaver Falls, Pa. for a rematch with the undefeated Geneva Covenanters. WUP right tackle McChesney decided to play for the East End Athletic Club and did not make the trip. John Kerr replaced him in the lineup. The WUP defense could not stop the balanced Geneva attack. Geneva captain Joe Thompson scored two touchdowns, one of which was a fifty yard jaunt. Jud Schmitt, Bruce Martin and Paul Critchlow also scored touchdowns and Schmitt kicked five goals after. At one point late in the first half the WUP offense managed to advance the ball to the Geneva ten yard line but turned it over on downs. The Covenanters proved to be superior to the WUP again and defeated them handily. The final score was 30–0. Geneva finished the season undefeated and their defense only allowed the 2 point safety to the WUP in the first meeting. The WUP lineup for the game against Geneva was Guy Patterson (left end), John Martin (left tackle), Walter Shidler (left guard), Stacy Hankey (center), John Boyd (right guard), John Kerr (right tackle), Paul McClain (right end), Joe McCready (quarterback), Richard Hawkins (right halfback), Frank Rugh (left halfback) and William Secrist (fullback). During the game Jackson replaced Richard Hawkins at right halfback. The game consisted of one twenty-five minute half and one nineteen minute half.

=== Waynesburg ===
The game scheduled for November 19 with Waynesburg College was cancelled. The Waynesburg team disbanded after three games.

=== Allegheny Athletic Club ===
Allegheny AC at WUP

Team	1	2	Total
Allegheny AC	0	0	0
• WUP	12	17	29

- Date: November 19, 1902
- Location: Colosseum (Recreation Park)
  Pittsburgh, PA
- Referee: E.L. Maul

Manager Charles Livingston was able to schedule a game with the Allegheny Athletic Club on short notice to replace Waynesburg. The Allegheny A.C. sent a team made up of players from various local clubs who had not played together, but proved to be a formidable opponent. Allegheny received the kick off. On the first play from scrimmage halfback Donnelly fumbled and WUP captain John Martin fell on it on the Allegheny twenty-five yard line. The WUP offense stalled and John Kerr missed a field goal. The WUP defense held and the offense again had the ball in Allegheny territory on the thirty-five yard line. This time John Martin and William Secrist advanced the ball downfield with Secrist finally plunging into the end zone for the go ahead touchdown. Frank Rugh kicked the goal after. On their next possession Allegheny end Glassburner fumbled a lateral and the Westerns recovered. John Martin scampered thirty-nine yards to the Allegheny nine yard line. Rugh and Secrist each picked up three yards and Martin then took the pigskin into the end zone for the second WUP touchdown. Rugh was successful on the goal kick after and the halftime score was 12–0. Martin continued to run roughshod through the Allegheny defense in the second half. He broke loose for gains of twenty-two, forty-eight and twenty-six yards, the latter on his second touchdown scamper. Frank Rugh scored on a twenty-one yard touchdown dash and Byron Stroud finished off the WUP scoring with a late touchdown. The final score was 29–0. The WUP lineup for the game against Allegheny A.C. was Byron Stroud (left end), G. Jackson (left tackle), Clyde McGogney (left guard), Stacy Hankey (center), John Boyd (right guard), John Kerr (right tackle), Richard Hawkins (right end), Joe McCready (quarterback), John Martin (right halfback), Frank Rugh (left halfback) and William Secrist (fullback). Substitutions during the game were: Guy Patterson replaced Frank Rugh at left halfback; R. Jackson replaced William Secrist at fullback; and George Stoyer replaced John Martin at right halfback. The game consisted of one twenty minute half and one fifteen minute half.

=== Mount Union ===
Mount Union at WUP

Team	1	2	Total
Mount Union	0		0
• WUP	6		6

- Date: November 22, 1902
- Location: Colosseum (Recreation Park)
  Pittsburgh, PA
- Game attendance: 100
- Referee: Prof. Edwin Lee (Mount Union)

Three days after the romp over the Allegheny A.C. the WUPs were scheduled to play Mount Union College for their last home game of the season. The Colosseum grounds were muddy and defense played a huge factor early in the game for both teams. The WUP was able to generate offense after three changes of possession and some wrangling over rules. They secured the ball on their own 50-yard line. On first down John Martin scampered twenty-five yards to the Mount Union thirty- five yard line. From there Rugh, Bennett, Jackson, Kerr and Martin methodically advanced the ball downfield. From the five yard line Frank Rugh carried the ball over the goal line for the game's only score. The goal kick after by Rugh was successful. WUP received the kick off and on second down Martin carried the ball and was tackled rather roughly by Grim of Mount Union. Mr. Martin proceeded to punch Mr. Grim. Teammates separated the two and order was restored. The referee, Professor Edwin Lee of Mount Union, ejected Martin from the game. Martin refused to leave on the basis that the referee could not make that decision. The umpire E.L. Maul did not see the initial altercation and refused to disqualify Mr. Martin. The Mount Union players left the field in protest. The umpire awarded the game to WUP and the referee claimed that Mount Union was the winner. The WUP lineup for the game against Mount Union was Byron Stroud (left end), G. Jackson (left tackle), Douglass (left guard), Stacy Hankey (center), John Boyd (right guard), Bennett (right tackle), Paul McClain (right end), Joe McCready (quarterback), John Martin (right halfback), Frank Rugh (left halfback) and John Kerr (fullback). The game lasted fifteen minutes.

=== At West Virginia ===
The WUP eleven were scheduled to play at Morgantown, West Virginia on Thanksgiving Day but the Mountaineers decided not to play the game.

== Scoring summary ==
1902 Western University of Pennsylvania scoring summary
Player	Touchdowns	Extra points	Safety	Points
William Secrist	6	0	0	30
Frank Rugh	3	12	0	27
John Martin	4	0	0	20
Edward Ward	1	0	0	5
Richard Hawkins	1	0	0	5
Guy Jackson	1	0	0	5
Bloom	1	0	0	5
Byron Stroud	1	0	0	5
Guy Patterson	0	0	1	2
Totals	18	12	1	104

== Roster ==
The roster of the 1902 Western University of Pennsylvania football team:

- Byron Stroud (end) earned his Bachelor of Science degree in 1904 and resided in Bradford, Pa.
- Dr. John Boyd (guard) earned his Doctor of Medicine degree in 1903 and resided in Pittsburgh, Pa.
- Dr. Stacy Hankey (center) earned his Doctor of Medicine degree in 1903 and resided in Pittsburgh, Pa.
- Frank Rugh (end) earned his Associate Law degree in 1904 and resided in Pittsburgh, Pa.
- Dr. Paul McLain (halfback) earned his Doctor of Medicine degree in 1903 and resided in Oil City, Pa.
- William Secrist (fullback) earned his Bachelor of Laws degree in 1903 and resided in Pittsburgh, Pa.
- Dr. Clyde McGogney (tackle) earned his Doctor of Medicine degree in 1905 and resided in Kaylor, Pa.
- Dr. John Kerr (substitute) earned his Doctor of Medicine degree in 1903.
- Dr. John M. McClymonds (tackle) earned his Doctor of Dental Surgery degree in 1903 and resided in Butler, Pa.
- Richard Hawkins earned his Bachelor of Laws degree in 1903 and resided in Pittsburgh, Pa.
- Dr. William McCready (quarterback) earned his Doctor of Dental Surgery degree in 1903 and resided in Pittsburgh, Pa.
- Dr. William Jackson (end) earned his Doctor of Dental Surgery degree in 1903 and resided in Tarentum, Pa.
- Dr. Ray M. Alexander (guard) earned his Doctor of Medicine degree in 1905 and resided in Bolivar, Pa.
- Dr. Walter Shidler (guard) earned his Doctor of Medicine degree in 1903 and resided in Hickory, Pa.
- Dr. Andrew B. Wallgren (tackle) earned his Doctor of Medicine degree in 1902 and resided in Wilkinsburg, Pa.
- Dr. George W. Stoyer (end) earned his Doctor of Medicine degree in 1903.
- Dr. Guy Patterson (end) earned his Doctor of Medicine degree in 1903 and resided in Washington, Pa.
- John Edwards (halfback) earned his Bachelor of Science degree in 1904 and resided in Cincinnati, Ohio
- Edward Ward (quarterback) earned his Associate Engineering degree in 1906
- Thomas Hewitt (end) earned his Bachelor of Science degree in 1904 and resided in Pittsburgh, Pa.
- Marion Edmundson (end) earned his associate law degree in 1906 and resided in McKeesport, Pa.
- Guy Jackson (tackle)
- Douglas (guard)
- Sweeney (tackle)
- Carpenter (end)
- Bennett (tackle)
- McChesney (tackle)
- R. Jackson (halfback)
- Bloom (center)
- Miller (center)
- Stagg (guard)
- Cosler (halfback)

== Coaching staff ==
- Fred Crolius (coach) attended Dartmouth College and also coached the Allegheny Athletic Association team. After his stint at the Western University of Pennsylvania he went east and coached the Villanova Wildcats from 1904 to 1911.
- Charles Livingston (manager) earned his Associate Law degree in 1903.
- Dr. John Martin (captain/halfback) earned his Doctor of Medicine degree in 1903 and resided in Pittsburgh, Pa.
