= Arthur White (American football) =

American football player, coach, physician, and hospital administrator

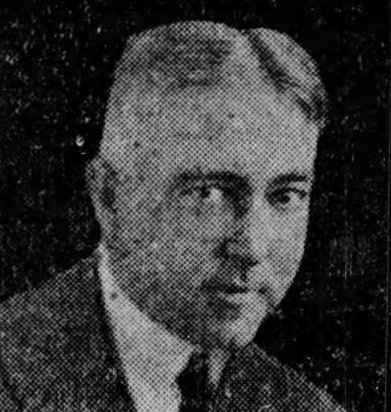

Biographical details
- Born: 1876; Dorchester, Massachusetts, U.S.
- Died: July 25, 1929 (aged 52); Boston, Massachusetts, U.S.

Playing career
- 1894–1897: Boston College

Coaching career (HC unless noted)
- 1902: Boston College

Head coaching record
- Overall: 0–8

Arthur Joseph White (1876 – July 25, 1929) was an American college football player and coach, physician, and hospital administrator. He was the sixth head football coach at Boston College, serving for one season, in 1902, and compiling a record of 0–8. White graduated from Harvard Medical School in 1902. He was assistant superintendent of Boston City Hospital from 1907 until his death in 1929. He also headed the Boston Sanatorium at Mattapan from 1914 until his death.

== Head coaching record ==
Year	Team	Overall	Conference	Standing	Bowl/playoffs
Boston College (Independent) (1902)
1902	Boston College	0–8			
Boston College:		0–8			
Total:		0–8			
