= 1902 Bucknell football team =

American college football season

1902 Bucknell football
- Conference: Independent
- Record: 6–4
- Head coach: George W. Hoskins (4th season)
- Captain: Walter Wilcox

1902 Eastern college football independents records
	Conf.			Overall
Team	W	L	T	W		L		T
Ursinus		–		9	–	0	–	0
Yale		–		11	–	0	–	1
Geneva		–		7	–	0	–	0
Harvard		–		11	–	1	–	0
Princeton		–		8	–	1	–	0
Army		–		6	–	1	–	1
Franklin & Marshall		–		7	–	2	–	0
Dartmouth		–		6	–	2	–	1
Holy Cross		–		6	–	2	–	1
Syracuse		–		6	–	2	–	1
Carlisle		–		8	–	3	–	0
Cornell		–		8	–	3	–	0
Lafayette		–		8	–	3	–	0
Amherst		–		7	–	3	–	0
Penn State		–		7	–	3	–	0
Penn		–		9	–	4	–	0
Lehigh		–		7	–	3	–	1
Vermont		–		5	–	3	–	2
Colgate		–		5	–	3	–	1
NYU		–		5	–	3	–	0
Bucknell		–		6	–	4	–	0
Washington & Jefferson		–		6	–	4	–	0
Columbia		–		6	–	4	–	1
Springfield Training School		–		3	–	2	–	1
Villanova		–		4	–	3	–	0
Brown		–		5	–	4	–	1
Swarthmore		–		6	–	6	–	0
Western U. of Penn.		–		5	–	6	–	1
New Hampshire		–		2	–	3	–	1
Buffalo		–		3	–	5	–	1
Tufts		–		4	–	6	–	1
Dickinson		–		4	–	6	–	0
Fordham		–		2	–	4	–	1
Wesleyan		–		3	–	6	–	1
Rutgers		–		3	–	7	–	0
Navy		–		2	–	7	–	1
Drexel		–		1	–	4	–	1
Temple		–		1	–	4	–	1
Pittsburgh College		–		1	–	6	–	0
Boston College		–		0	–	8	–	0

The 1902 Bucknell football team was an American football team that represented Bucknell University as an independent during the 1902 college football season. Led by fourth-year head coach George W. Hoskins, Bucknell compiled a 6–4 record. Walter Wilcox was the team captain.

== Schedule ==
Date	Time	Opponent	Site	Result	Attendance	Source
September 27		Steelton YMCA	Lewisburg, PA	W 6–0		
October 4		at Buffalo	Buffalo Athletic Field; Buffalo, NY	W 29–0		
October 11		vs. Carlisle	Williamsport, PA	W 16–0	3,000	
October 18		at Pittsburgh Stars	Pittsburgh, PA	L 0–24		
October 25		at Penn	Franklin Field; Philadelphia, PA	L 5–6		
November 1		Villanova	Lewisburg, PA	W 61–5		
November 8		at Yale	Yale Field; New Haven, CT	L 5–36	6,000	
November 15		at Navy	Worden Field; Annapolis, MD	W 23–0		
November 22		Baltimore Medical	Lewisburg, PA	W 17–5		
November 27		at Watertown Athletic Club	Watertown, NY	L 0–6		
