= 1902 Boston College football team =

American college football season

1902 Boston College football
- Conference: Independent
- Record: 0–8
- Head coach: Arthur White (1st season)
- Captain: Pat Sullivan
- Home stadium: South End Grounds

1902 Eastern college football independents records
| | Conf. | | | Overall |
| Team | W | L | T | W | | L | | T |
|---|---|---|---|---|---|---|---|---|
| Ursinus | | – | | 9 | – | 0 | – | 0 |
| Yale | | – | | 11 | – | 0 | – | 1 |
| Geneva | | – | | 7 | – | 0 | – | 0 |
| Harvard | | – | | 11 | – | 1 | – | 0 |
| Princeton | | – | | 8 | – | 1 | – | 0 |
| Army | | – | | 6 | – | 1 | – | 1 |
| Franklin & Marshall | | – | | 7 | – | 2 | – | 0 |
| Dartmouth | | – | | 6 | – | 2 | – | 1 |
| Holy Cross | | – | | 6 | – | 2 | – | 1 |
| Syracuse | | – | | 6 | – | 2 | – | 1 |
| Carlisle | | – | | 8 | – | 3 | – | 0 |
| Cornell | | – | | 8 | – | 3 | – | 0 |
| Lafayette | | – | | 8 | – | 3 | – | 0 |
| Amherst | | – | | 7 | – | 3 | – | 0 |
| Penn State | | – | | 7 | – | 3 | – | 0 |
| Penn | | – | | 9 | – | 4 | – | 0 |
| Lehigh | | – | | 7 | – | 3 | – | 1 |
| Vermont | | – | | 5 | – | 3 | – | 2 |
| Colgate | | – | | 5 | – | 3 | – | 1 |
| NYU | | – | | 5 | – | 3 | – | 0 |
| Bucknell | | – | | 6 | – | 4 | – | 0 |
| Washington & Jefferson | | – | | 6 | – | 4 | – | 0 |
| Columbia | | – | | 6 | – | 4 | – | 1 |
| Springfield Training School | | – | | 3 | – | 2 | – | 1 |
| Villanova | | – | | 4 | – | 3 | – | 0 |
| Brown | | – | | 5 | – | 4 | – | 1 |
| Swarthmore | | – | | 6 | – | 6 | – | 0 |
| Western U. of Penn. | | – | | 5 | – | 6 | – | 1 |
| New Hampshire | | – | | 2 | – | 3 | – | 1 |
| Buffalo | | – | | 3 | – | 5 | – | 1 |
| Tufts | | – | | 4 | – | 6 | – | 1 |
| Dickinson | | – | | 4 | – | 6 | – | 0 |
| Fordham | | – | | 2 | – | 4 | – | 1 |
| Wesleyan | | – | | 3 | – | 6 | – | 1 |
| Rutgers | | – | | 3 | – | 7 | – | 0 |
| Navy | | – | | 2 | – | 7 | – | 1 |
| Drexel | | – | | 1 | – | 4 | – | 1 |
| Temple | | – | | 1 | – | 4 | – | 1 |
| Pittsburgh College | | – | | 1 | – | 6 | – | 0 |
| Boston College | | – | | 0 | – | 8 | – | 0 |

The 1902 Boston College football team was an American football team that represented Boston College as an independent during the 1902 college football season. Led by Arthur White in his first and only season as head coach, Boston College compiled a record of 0–8.

== Schedule ==
| Date | Opponent | Site | Result | Source |
|---|---|---|---|---|
| September 24 | at Tufts | Tufts Oval; Medford, MA | L 0–6 | |
| October 4 | at Massachusetts | Alumni Field; Amherst, MA (rivalry) | L 0–30 | |
| October 11 | at Bates | Garcelon Field; Lewiston, ME | L 5–17 | |
| October 17 | at Andover Academy | Andover, MA | L 0–24 | |
| October 25 | at New Hampshire | Central Park; Dover, NH | L 6–10 | |
| November 1 | at Exeter Academy | Exeter, NH | L 0–29 | |
| November 22 | Holy Cross | South End Grounds; Boston, MA (rivalry) | L 0–22 | |
| November 27 | Tufts | South End Grounds; Boston, MA | L 0–26 | |
