= 1902 Army Cadets football team =

American college football season

1902 Army Cadets football
- Conference: Independent
- Record: 6–1–1
- Head coach: Dennis E. Nolan (1st season)
- Captain: Robert Boyers
- Home stadium: The Plain

1902 Eastern college football independents records
| | Conf. | | | Overall |
| Team | W | L | T | W | | L | | T |
|---|---|---|---|---|---|---|---|---|
| Ursinus | | – | | 9 | – | 0 | – | 0 |
| Yale | | – | | 11 | – | 0 | – | 1 |
| Geneva | | – | | 7 | – | 0 | – | 0 |
| Harvard | | – | | 11 | – | 1 | – | 0 |
| Princeton | | – | | 8 | – | 1 | – | 0 |
| Army | | – | | 6 | – | 1 | – | 1 |
| Franklin & Marshall | | – | | 7 | – | 2 | – | 0 |
| Dartmouth | | – | | 6 | – | 2 | – | 1 |
| Holy Cross | | – | | 6 | – | 2 | – | 1 |
| Syracuse | | – | | 6 | – | 2 | – | 1 |
| Carlisle | | – | | 8 | – | 3 | – | 0 |
| Cornell | | – | | 8 | – | 3 | – | 0 |
| Lafayette | | – | | 8 | – | 3 | – | 0 |
| Amherst | | – | | 7 | – | 3 | – | 0 |
| Penn State | | – | | 7 | – | 3 | – | 0 |
| Penn | | – | | 9 | – | 4 | – | 0 |
| Lehigh | | – | | 7 | – | 3 | – | 1 |
| Vermont | | – | | 5 | – | 3 | – | 2 |
| Colgate | | – | | 5 | – | 3 | – | 1 |
| NYU | | – | | 5 | – | 3 | – | 0 |
| Bucknell | | – | | 6 | – | 4 | – | 0 |
| Washington & Jefferson | | – | | 6 | – | 4 | – | 0 |
| Columbia | | – | | 6 | – | 4 | – | 1 |
| Springfield Training School | | – | | 3 | – | 2 | – | 1 |
| Villanova | | – | | 4 | – | 3 | – | 0 |
| Brown | | – | | 5 | – | 4 | – | 1 |
| Swarthmore | | – | | 6 | – | 6 | – | 0 |
| Western U. of Penn. | | – | | 5 | – | 6 | – | 1 |
| New Hampshire | | – | | 2 | – | 3 | – | 1 |
| Buffalo | | – | | 3 | – | 5 | – | 1 |
| Tufts | | – | | 4 | – | 6 | – | 1 |
| Dickinson | | – | | 4 | – | 6 | – | 0 |
| Fordham | | – | | 2 | – | 4 | – | 1 |
| Wesleyan | | – | | 3 | – | 6 | – | 1 |
| Rutgers | | – | | 3 | – | 7 | – | 0 |
| Navy | | – | | 2 | – | 7 | – | 1 |
| Drexel | | – | | 1 | – | 4 | – | 1 |
| Temple | | – | | 1 | – | 4 | – | 1 |
| Pittsburgh College | | – | | 1 | – | 6 | – | 0 |
| Boston College | | – | | 0 | – | 8 | – | 0 |

The 1902 Army Cadets football team represented the United States Military Academy as an independent during the 1902 college football season. In their only season under head coach Dennis E. Nolan, the Cadets compiled a 6–1–1 record, shut out five of their eight opponents, and outscored all opponents by a combined total of 180 to 28. Army's only loss was 14–6 to Harvard. The Cadets also defeated Syracuse by a 46 to 0 score and tied with an undefeated Yale team that has been recognized as a national co-champion. In the annual Army–Navy Game at Franklin Field in Philadelphia, the Cadets defeated the Midshipmen 22–8.

Two members of this team were inducted into the College Football Hall of Fame: quarterback Charles Dudley Daly and tackle Paul Bunker. In addition, five members of the squad were honored by one or both of Walter Camp (WC) and Caspar Whitney (CW) on the All-America team. They are: Bunker (WC-1, CW-1); Daly (WC-3); center Robert Boyers (WC-2, CW-1); tackle Edward Farnsworth (CW-2); and fullback Henry Torney (WC-3).

== Schedule ==
| Date | Opponent | Site | Result | Source |
|---|---|---|---|---|
| October 4 | Tufts | The Plain; West Point, NY | W 5–0 | |
| October 11 | Dickinson | The Plain; West Point, NY | W 11–0 | |
| October 18 | Harvard | The Plain; West Point, NY | L 6–14 | |
| October 25 | Williams | The Plain; West Point, NY | W 28–0 | |
| November 1 | Yale | The Plain; West Point, NY | T 6–6 | |
| November 8 | Union (NY) | The Plain; West Point, NY | W 56–0 | |
| November 15 | Syracuse | The Plain; West Point, NY | W 46–0 | |
| November 29 | vs. Navy | Franklin Field; Philadelphia, PA (Army–Navy Game) | W 22–8 | |

== Personnel ==
- HB Paul Bunker
