= 1902 Colgate football team =

American college football season

1902 Colgate football
- Conference: Independent
- Record: 5–3–1
- Head coach: Frank "Buck" O'Neill (1st season)
- Captain: Carl H. Smith
- Home stadium: Whitnall Field

1902 Eastern college football independents records
	Conf.			Overall
Team	W	L	T	W		L		T
Ursinus		–		9	–	0	–	0
Yale		–		11	–	0	–	1
Geneva		–		7	–	0	–	0
Harvard		–		11	–	1	–	0
Princeton		–		8	–	1	–	0
Army		–		6	–	1	–	1
Franklin & Marshall		–		7	–	2	–	0
Dartmouth		–		6	–	2	–	1
Holy Cross		–		6	–	2	–	1
Syracuse		–		6	–	2	–	1
Carlisle		–		8	–	3	–	0
Cornell		–		8	–	3	–	0
Lafayette		–		8	–	3	–	0
Amherst		–		7	–	3	–	0
Penn State		–		7	–	3	–	0
Penn		–		9	–	4	–	0
Lehigh		–		7	–	3	–	1
Vermont		–		5	–	3	–	2
Colgate		–		5	–	3	–	1
NYU		–		5	–	3	–	0
Bucknell		–		6	–	4	–	0
Washington & Jefferson		–		6	–	4	–	0
Columbia		–		6	–	4	–	1
Springfield Training School		–		3	–	2	–	1
Villanova		–		4	–	3	–	0
Brown		–		5	–	4	–	1
Swarthmore		–		6	–	6	–	0
Western U. of Penn.		–		5	–	6	–	1
New Hampshire		–		2	–	3	–	1
Buffalo		–		3	–	5	–	1
Tufts		–		4	–	6	–	1
Dickinson		–		4	–	6	–	0
Fordham		–		2	–	4	–	1
Wesleyan		–		3	–	6	–	1
Rutgers		–		3	–	7	–	0
Navy		–		2	–	7	–	1
Drexel		–		1	–	4	–	1
Temple		–		1	–	4	–	1
Pittsburgh College		–		1	–	6	–	0
Boston College		–		0	–	8	–	0

The 1902 Colgate football team was an American football team that represented Colgate University as an independent during the 1902 college football season. In its first and only season under head coach Frank "Buck" O'Neill, the team compiled a 5–3–1 record. Carl Smith was the team captain. The team played its home games on Whitnall Field in Hamilton, New York.

== Schedule ==
Date	Opponent	Site	Result	Attendance	Source
September 20	Colgate Academy	Whitnall Field; Hamilton, NY	W 24–0		
September 27	at Cornell	Percy Field; Ithaca, NY (rivalry)	L 0–5		
October 4	St. Lawrence	Whitnall Field; Hamilton, NY	W 36–0		
October 11	at Syracuse	Syracuse, NY	L 0–23	3,000	
October 18	vs. Rensselaer Polytechnic	Albany, NY	W 29–0		
October 25	Hobart	Whitnall Field; Hamilton, NY	W 50–0		
October 29	at Williams	Williamstown, MA	L 5–16		
November 2	at Rochester	Rochester, NY	W 22–0		
November 8	at Hamilton	Clinton, NY	T 11–11		
