= 1902 Massachusetts Aggies football team =

American college football season

1902 Massachusetts Aggies football
- Conference: Athletic League of New England State Colleges
- Record: 2–3–2 ( Athletic League of New England State Colleges)
- Head coach: James Halligan (2nd season)
- Home stadium: Alumni Field

The 1902 Massachusetts Aggies football team represented Massachusetts Agricultural College in the 1902 college football season. The team was coached by James Halligan and played its home games at Alumni Field in Amherst, Massachusetts. Massachusetts finished the season with a record of 2–3–2.

== Schedule ==
Date	Opponent	Site	Result	Source
September 27	at Holy Cross	Worcester College Grounds; Worcester, MA	T 0–0	
October 4	Boston College	Alumni Field; Amherst, MA (rivalry)	W 30–0	
October 8	at Dartmouth	Alumni Oval; Hanover, NH	T 0–0	
October 18	at Wesleyan	Andrus Field; Middletown, CT	L 5–6	
October 25	at Tufts	Tufts Oval; Somerville, MA	W 5–0	
November 1	Worcester Tech	Alumni Field; Amherst, MA	L 0–6	
November 8	at Amherst	Pratt Field; Amherst, MA	L 0–15	
