= 1902 Columbia Blue and White football team =

American college football season

1902 Columbia Blue and White football
- Conference: Independent
- Record: 6–4–1
- Head coach: Bill Morley (1st season)
- Captain: Harold Weekes
- Home stadium: Polo Grounds

1902 Eastern college football independents records
	Conf.			Overall
Team	W	L	T	W		L		T
Ursinus		–		9	–	0	–	0
Yale		–		11	–	0	–	1
Geneva		–		7	–	0	–	0
Harvard		–		11	–	1	–	0
Princeton		–		8	–	1	–	0
Army		–		6	–	1	–	1
Franklin & Marshall		–		7	–	2	–	0
Dartmouth		–		6	–	2	–	1
Holy Cross		–		6	–	2	–	1
Syracuse		–		6	–	2	–	1
Carlisle		–		8	–	3	–	0
Cornell		–		8	–	3	–	0
Lafayette		–		8	–	3	–	0
Amherst		–		7	–	3	–	0
Penn State		–		7	–	3	–	0
Penn		–		9	–	4	–	0
Lehigh		–		7	–	3	–	1
Vermont		–		5	–	3	–	2
Colgate		–		5	–	3	–	1
NYU		–		5	–	3	–	0
Bucknell		–		6	–	4	–	0
Washington & Jefferson		–		6	–	4	–	0
Columbia		–		6	–	4	–	1
Springfield Training School		–		3	–	2	–	1
Villanova		–		4	–	3	–	0
Brown		–		5	–	4	–	1
Swarthmore		–		6	–	6	–	0
Western U. of Penn.		–		5	–	6	–	1
New Hampshire		–		2	–	3	–	1
Buffalo		–		3	–	5	–	1
Tufts		–		4	–	6	–	1
Dickinson		–		4	–	6	–	0
Fordham		–		2	–	4	–	1
Wesleyan		–		3	–	6	–	1
Rutgers		–		3	–	7	–	0
Navy		–		2	–	7	–	1
Drexel		–		1	–	4	–	1
Temple		–		1	–	4	–	1
Pittsburgh College		–		1	–	6	–	0
Boston College		–		0	–	8	–	0

The 1902 Columbia Blue and White football team was an American football team that represented Columbia University as an independent during the 1902 college football season. In its first season under head coach Bill Morley, the team compiled a 6–4–1 record and outscored opponents by a total of 163 to 101, including six shutouts.

Halfback Harold Weekes was the team captain. He also received second-team honors from Caspar Whitney on the 1902 All-America team.

Columbia's sports teams were commonly called the "Blue and White" in this era, but had no official nickname. The name "Lions" would not be adopted until 1910.

The team played its seven home games at the Polo Grounds in Upper Manhattan.

== Schedule ==
Date	Opponent	Site	Result	Attendance	Source
October 4	at Rutgers	Neilson Field; New Brunswick, NJ	W 43–0		
October 8	Fordham	Polo Grounds; New York, NY	W 45–0		
October 11	Buffalo	Polo Grounds; New York, NY	W 5–0		
October 15	Swarthmore	Polo Grounds; New York, NY	W 24–0		
October 18	Hamilton	Polo Grounds; New York, NY	W 35–0		
October 25	at Princeton	University Field; Princeton, NJ	L 0–21	6,000	
November 1	at Penn	Franklin Field; Philadelphia, PA	L 0–17	15,000	
November 8	Brown	Polo Grounds; New York, NY	L 0–28		
November 15	Amherst	Polo Grounds; New York, NY	L 0–29	4,000	
November 19	at Navy	Worden Field; Annapolis, MD	W 5–0		
November 27	Syracuse	Polo Grounds; New York, NY	T 6–6	4,000	
