= 1902 Yale Bulldogs football team =

American college football season

1902 Yale Bulldogs football
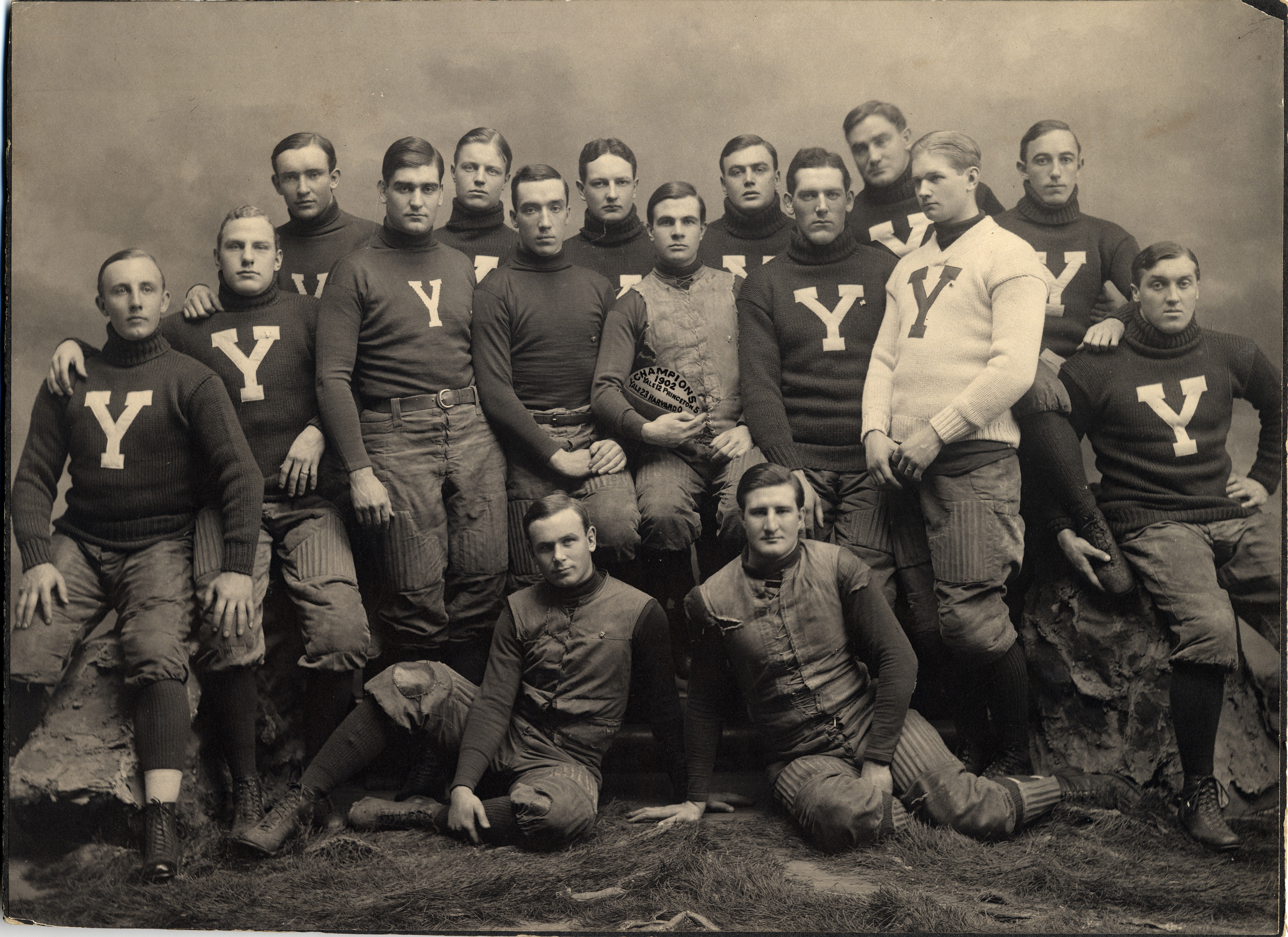

Co-national champion (Davis)
- Conference: Independent
- Record: 11–0–1
- Head coach: Joseph R. Swan (1st season)
- Captain: George B. Chadwick
- Home stadium: Yale Field

1902 Eastern college football independents records
	Conf.			Overall
Team	W	L	T	W		L		T
Ursinus		–		9	–	0	–	0
Yale		–		11	–	0	–	1
Geneva		–		7	–	0	–	0
Harvard		–		11	–	1	–	0
Princeton		–		8	–	1	–	0
Army		–		6	–	1	–	1
Franklin & Marshall		–		7	–	2	–	0
Dartmouth		–		6	–	2	–	1
Holy Cross		–		6	–	2	–	1
Syracuse		–		6	–	2	–	1
Carlisle		–		8	–	3	–	0
Cornell		–		8	–	3	–	0
Lafayette		–		8	–	3	–	0
Amherst		–		7	–	3	–	0
Penn State		–		7	–	3	–	0
Penn		–		9	–	4	–	0
Lehigh		–		7	–	3	–	1
Vermont		–		5	–	3	–	2
Colgate		–		5	–	3	–	1
NYU		–		5	–	3	–	0
Bucknell		–		6	–	4	–	0
Washington & Jefferson		–		6	–	4	–	0
Columbia		–		6	–	4	–	1
Springfield Training School		–		3	–	2	–	1
Villanova		–		4	–	3	–	0
Brown		–		5	–	4	–	1
Swarthmore		–		6	–	6	–	0
Western U. of Penn.		–		5	–	6	–	1
New Hampshire		–		2	–	3	–	1
Buffalo		–		3	–	5	–	1
Tufts		–		4	–	6	–	1
Dickinson		–		4	–	6	–	0
Fordham		–		2	–	4	–	1
Wesleyan		–		3	–	6	–	1
Rutgers		–		3	–	7	–	0
Navy		–		2	–	7	–	1
Drexel		–		1	–	4	–	1
Temple		–		1	–	4	–	1
Pittsburgh College		–		1	–	6	–	0
Boston College		–		0	–	8	–	0

The 1902 Yale Bulldogs football team was an American football team that represented Yale University as an independent during the 1902 college football season. The team finished with an 11–0–1 record, shut out eight of twelve opponents, and outscored all opponents by a total of 286 to 22. Joseph R. Swan was the head coach, and George B. Chadwick was the team captain.

Yale was selected as the 1902 champion in the 1903 edition of the World Almanac.

In the absence of any recognized Intercollegiate Football Association the championship cannot always be unerringly fixed; but in 1902 there is no difficulty in allotting the honor to Yale, inasmuch as she won every one of her games.

— The World Almanac and Encyclopedia (1903)

In 1933 Yale was retroactively named as the national co-champion, along with Michigan, by NCAA-designated "major selector" Parke H. Davis.

Seven Yale players were selected as consensus first-team players on the 1902 All-America team. The team's consensus All-Americans were: quarterback Foster Rockwell; halfback George B. Chadwick; end Tom Shevlin; center Henry Holt; guard Edward Glass; and tackles Ralph Kinney and James Hogan.

== Schedule ==
Date	Opponent	Site	Result	Attendance	Source
September 27	Trinity (CT)	Yale Field; New Haven, CT	W 40–0		
October 1	Tufts	Yale Field; New Haven, CT	W 34–6		
October 4	Amherst	Yale Field; New Haven, CT	W 23–0		
October 8	Wesleyan	Yale Field; New Haven, CT	W 35–0		
October 11	at Brown	Andrews Field; Providence, RI	W 10–0		
October 15	Vermont	Yale Field; New Haven, CT	W 32–0		
October 18	Penn State	Yale Field; New Haven, CT	W 11–0		
October 25	Syracuse	Yale Field; New Haven, CT	W 24–0		
November 1	at Army	The Plain; West Point, NY	T 6–6		
November 8	Bucknell	Yale Field; New Haven, CT	W 36–5	6,000	
November 15	at Princeton	University Field; Princeton, NJ (rivalry)	W 12–5	20,000	
November 22	Harvard	Yale Field; New Haven, CT (rivalry)	W 23–0	30,000	

== Roster ==
- Arthur W. Allen, HB
- Harold S. Batchelder, G
- Harry E. Benham
- Martin H. Bergen
- Lebbeus F. Bissell, T
- Morgan H. Bowman, FB
- George B. Chadwick, HB
- Ralston R. Coffin, E
- Malcolm Farmer, HB
- Edgar Glass, G
- George A. Goss, G
- Chauncey J. Hamlin, T
- Morin S. Hare, E
- Hinkle, HB
- James Hogan, T
- Henry Holt, C
- Ralph Kinney, G
- McClintock, FB
- Harold G. Metcalf, QB
- John A. Moorhead, E
- Chester T. Neal, E
- James C. Preston, HB
- Charles D. Rafferty, E
- Foster Rockwell, QB
- Carleton Shaw, HB
- Tom Shevlin, T
- Willard B. Soper, HB
- S. Oakley Van der Poel, FB
- S. Dwight Ward, HB
- Frederick W. Wilhelmi, E
- Burnside Winslow, QB
