= 1902 Washington & Jefferson Red and Black football team =

American college football season

1902 Washington & Jefferson Red and Black football
- Conference: Independent
- Record: 6–4
- Head coach: William B. Seaman (1st season)
- Captain: Hayes
- Home stadium: College Park

1902 Eastern college football independents records
	Conf.			Overall
Team	W	L	T	W		L		T
Ursinus		–		9	–	0	–	0
Yale		–		11	–	0	–	1
Geneva		–		7	–	0	–	0
Harvard		–		11	–	1	–	0
Princeton		–		8	–	1	–	0
Army		–		6	–	1	–	1
Franklin & Marshall		–		7	–	2	–	0
Dartmouth		–		6	–	2	–	1
Holy Cross		–		6	–	2	–	1
Syracuse		–		6	–	2	–	1
Carlisle		–		8	–	3	–	0
Cornell		–		8	–	3	–	0
Lafayette		–		8	–	3	–	0
Amherst		–		7	–	3	–	0
Penn State		–		7	–	3	–	0
Penn		–		9	–	4	–	0
Lehigh		–		7	–	3	–	1
Vermont		–		5	–	3	–	2
Colgate		–		5	–	3	–	1
NYU		–		5	–	3	–	0
Bucknell		–		6	–	4	–	0
Washington & Jefferson		–		6	–	4	–	0
Columbia		–		6	–	4	–	1
Springfield Training School		–		3	–	2	–	1
Villanova		–		4	–	3	–	0
Brown		–		5	–	4	–	1
Swarthmore		–		6	–	6	–	0
Western U. of Penn.		–		5	–	6	–	1
New Hampshire		–		2	–	3	–	1
Buffalo		–		3	–	5	–	1
Tufts		–		4	–	6	–	1
Dickinson		–		4	–	6	–	0
Fordham		–		2	–	4	–	1
Wesleyan		–		3	–	6	–	1
Rutgers		–		3	–	7	–	0
Navy		–		2	–	7	–	1
Drexel		–		1	–	4	–	1
Temple		–		1	–	4	–	1
Pittsburgh College		–		1	–	6	–	0
Boston College		–		0	–	8	–	0

The 1902 Washington & Jefferson football team was an American football team that represented Washington & Jefferson College as an independent during the 1902 college football season. Led by first-year head coach William B. Seaman, the team compiled a record of 6–4.

== Schedule ==
Date	Time	Opponent	Site	Result	Attendance	Source
September 27	3:10 p.m.	California Normal (PA)	College Park; Washington, PA	W 23–0	450	
October 4	3:40 p.m.	Marietta	College Park; Washington, PA	W 22–0	500	
October 11		Western Reserve	Athletic Field; Washington, PA	W 17–0	4,000–4,400	
October 14		Lafayette	College Park; Washington, PA	L 0–12	3,000	
October 18		at Princeton	University Field; Princeton, NJ	L 5–23		
October 25		at Ohio Medical	Neil Park; Columbus, OH	L 5–6		
November 8		at Cornell	Percy Field; Ithaca, NY	L 0–50		
November 15	3:40 p.m.	Pittsburgh College	College Park; Washington, PA	W 49–0	400	
November 19		West Virginia	College Park; Washington, PA	W 23–0		
November 27		at East End Athletic Association	Friendship Park; Pittsburgh, PA	W 6–2	3,000	
All times are in Eastern time
