= W. H. Rorke =

American football player and coach

Playing career
- ?: NYU

Coaching career (HC unless noted)
- 1901–1902: NYU

Head coaching record
- Overall: 9–6–1

W. H. Rorke was an American college football player and coach. He was the fifth head football coach at New York University (NYU), serving for two seasons, from 1901 to 1902, and leading the NYU Violets to a record of 9–6–1. The one tie game he coached was in the 1901 season against Union on November 23. The game ended in a score of 11–11. He attended Poly Prep Country Day School as well as NYU, playing football at the latter.

== Head coaching record ==
Year	Team	Overall	Conference	Standing	Bowl/playoffs
NYU Violets (Independent) (1901–1902)
1901	NYU	4–3–1			
1902	NYU	5–3			
NYU:		9–6–1			
Total:		9–6–1			
