= James Halligan (American football) =

American football coach and college athletic administrator

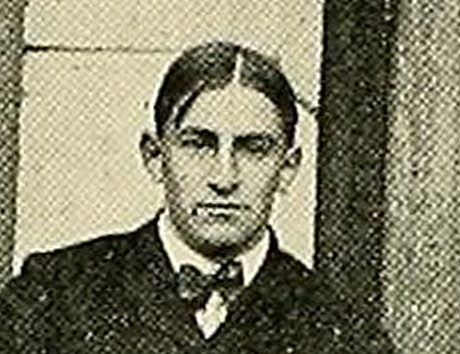
- Halligan in the 1901 Massachusetts Agricultural football team photo

Biographical details
- Born: February 11, 1879; Boston, Massachusetts, U.S.
- Died: January 30, 1965 (aged 85); Louisiana, U.S.

Coaching career (HC unless noted)
- 1901–1903: Massachusetts
- 1904–1905: Delaware Valley

Administrative career (AD unless noted)
- 1910–1913: LSU

Head coaching record
- Overall: 20–10–3

James Edward Halligan (February 11, 1879 – January 30, 1965) was an American football coach and college athletic administrator. He served as the head football coach at Massachusetts Agricultural College—now the University of Massachusetts Amherst—from 1901 to 1903 and at Delaware Valley College for 1904 and 1905, compiling a career college football record of 20–10–3 overall. Halligan was the athletic director at Louisiana State University (LSU) from 1910 to 1913. He also worked as a chemist and fertilizer expert. He died on January 30, 1965.

== Head coaching record ==
Year	Team	Overall	Conference	Standing	Bowl/playoffs
Massachusetts Aggies (Independent) (1901–1903)
1901	Massachusetts	9–1			
1902	Massachusetts	2–3–2			
1903	Massachusetts	5–4			
Massachusetts:		16–8–2			
Delaware Valley Aggies (Independent) (1904–1905)
1904	Delaware Valley	3–0–1			
1905	Delaware Valley	1–2			
Delaware Valley:		4–2–1			
Total:		20–10–3			
