= 1902 Ursinus football team =

American college football season

1902 Ursinus football
- Conference: Independent
- Record: 9–0
- Head coach: Edward E. Kelley (2nd season)

1902 Eastern college football independents records
	Conf.			Overall
Team	W	L	T	W		L		T
Ursinus		–		9	–	0	–	0
Yale		–		11	–	0	–	1
Geneva		–		7	–	0	–	0
Harvard		–		11	–	1	–	0
Princeton		–		8	–	1	–	0
Army		–		6	–	1	–	1
Franklin & Marshall		–		7	–	2	–	0
Dartmouth		–		6	–	2	–	1
Holy Cross		–		6	–	2	–	1
Syracuse		–		6	–	2	–	1
Carlisle		–		8	–	3	–	0
Cornell		–		8	–	3	–	0
Lafayette		–		8	–	3	–	0
Amherst		–		7	–	3	–	0
Penn State		–		7	–	3	–	0
Penn		–		9	–	4	–	0
Lehigh		–		7	–	3	–	1
Vermont		–		5	–	3	–	2
Colgate		–		5	–	3	–	1
NYU		–		5	–	3	–	0
Bucknell		–		6	–	4	–	0
Washington & Jefferson		–		6	–	4	–	0
Columbia		–		6	–	4	–	1
Springfield Training School		–		3	–	2	–	1
Villanova		–		4	–	3	–	0
Brown		–		5	–	4	–	1
Swarthmore		–		6	–	6	–	0
Western U. of Penn.		–		5	–	6	–	1
New Hampshire		–		2	–	3	–	1
Buffalo		–		3	–	5	–	1
Tufts		–		4	–	6	–	1
Dickinson		–		4	–	6	–	0
Fordham		–		2	–	4	–	1
Wesleyan		–		3	–	6	–	1
Rutgers		–		3	–	7	–	0
Navy		–		2	–	7	–	1
Drexel		–		1	–	4	–	1
Temple		–		1	–	4	–	1
Pittsburgh College		–		1	–	6	–	0
Boston College		–		0	–	8	–	0

The 1902 Ursinus football team was an American football team that represented Ursinus College during the 1902 college football season. The team compiled a perfect 9–0 record and outscored opponents by a total of 194 to 20. Edward E. Kelley was the head coach.

== Schedule ==
Date	Opponent	Site	Result	Source
September	at Muhlenberg	Collegeville, PA	W 63–0	
September 27	at Williamson School	Media, PA	W 17–0	
October 1	at Dickinson	Carlisle, PA	W 6–5	
October 4	Lebanon Valley	Collegeville, PA	W 38–0	
October 11	at NYU	Ohio Field; Bronx, NY	W 16–0	
October 18	at Rutgers	Neilson Field; New Brunswick, NJ	W 16–0	
October 25	Swarthmore	Collegeville, PA	W 16–10	
November 1	Haverford	Haverford, PA	W 6–5	
November 15	Franklin & Marshall	Collegeville, PA	W 16–0	
