= 1902 Penn Quakers football team =

American college football season

1902 Penn Quakers football
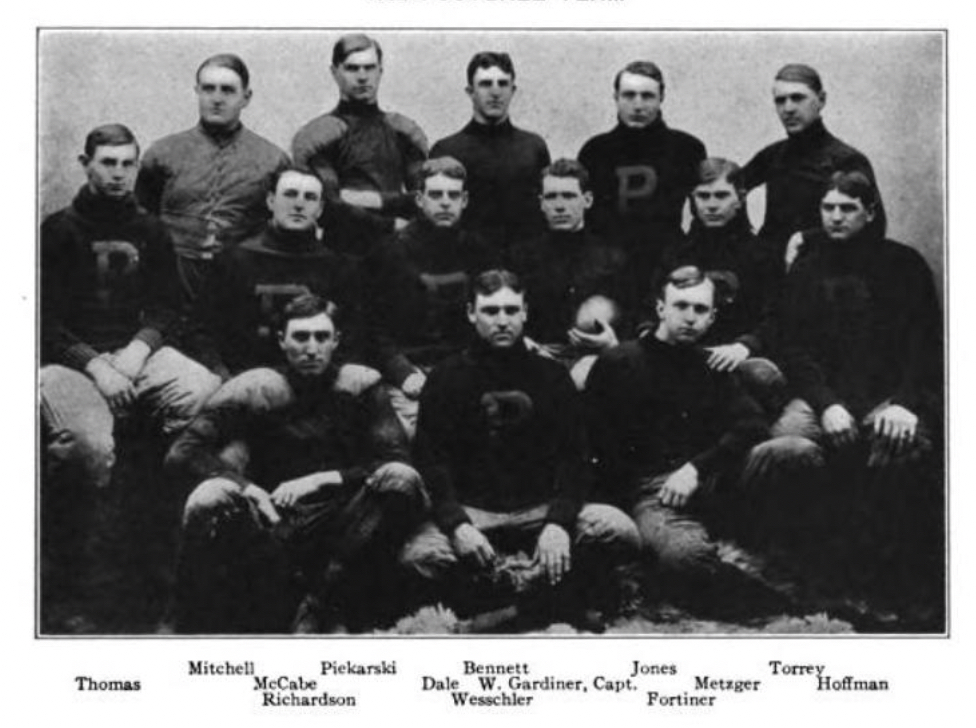
- Conference: Independent
- Record: 9–4
- Head coach: Carl S. Williams (1st season)
- Captain: Bill Gardiner
- Home stadium: Franklin Field

1902 Eastern college football independents records
	Conf.			Overall
Team	W	L	T	W		L		T
Ursinus		–		9	–	0	–	0
Yale		–		11	–	0	–	1
Geneva		–		7	–	0	–	0
Harvard		–		11	–	1	–	0
Princeton		–		8	–	1	–	0
Army		–		6	–	1	–	1
Franklin & Marshall		–		7	–	2	–	0
Dartmouth		–		6	–	2	–	1
Holy Cross		–		6	–	2	–	1
Syracuse		–		6	–	2	–	1
Carlisle		–		8	–	3	–	0
Cornell		–		8	–	3	–	0
Lafayette		–		8	–	3	–	0
Amherst		–		7	–	3	–	0
Penn State		–		7	–	3	–	0
Penn		–		9	–	4	–	0
Lehigh		–		7	–	3	–	1
Vermont		–		5	–	3	–	2
Colgate		–		5	–	3	–	1
NYU		–		5	–	3	–	0
Bucknell		–		6	–	4	–	0
Washington & Jefferson		–		6	–	4	–	0
Columbia		–		6	–	4	–	1
Springfield Training School		–		3	–	2	–	1
Villanova		–		4	–	3	–	0
Brown		–		5	–	4	–	1
Swarthmore		–		6	–	6	–	0
Western U. of Penn.		–		5	–	6	–	1
New Hampshire		–		2	–	3	–	1
Buffalo		–		3	–	5	–	1
Tufts		–		4	–	6	–	1
Dickinson		–		4	–	6	–	0
Fordham		–		2	–	4	–	1
Wesleyan		–		3	–	6	–	1
Rutgers		–		3	–	7	–	0
Navy		–		2	–	7	–	1
Drexel		–		1	–	4	–	1
Temple		–		1	–	4	–	1
Pittsburgh College		–		1	–	6	–	0
Boston College		–		0	–	8	–	0

The 1902 Penn Quakers football team represented the University of Pennsylvania as an independent during the 1902 college football season. The Quakers finished with a 9–4 record in their first year under head coach Carl S. Williams. Significant games included victories over Penn State (17–0), Columbia (17–0), and Cornell (12–11), and losses to Navy (10–6), Harvard (11–0), and Carlisle (5–9). The 1902 Penn team outscored its opponents by a combined total of 157 to 68. Three Penn players received recognition on the 1902 College Football All-America Team: end Sol Metzger (Walter Camp, 3rd team); tackle Robert Torrey (Caspar Whitney, 2nd team); and center James F. McCabe (Camp, 3rd team).

== Schedule ==
Date	Opponent	Site	Result	Attendance	Source
September 27	Lehigh	Franklin Field; Philadelphia, PA	W 12–0		
October 1	Franklin & Marshall	Franklin Field; Philadelphia, PA	W 16–0		
October 4	Penn State	Franklin Field; Philadelphia, PA	W 17–0		
October 8	Haverford	Franklin Field; Philadelphia, PA	W 18–5		
October 11	Swarthmore	Franklin Field; Philadelphia, PA	W 11–6		
October 15	Gettysburg	Franklin Field; Philadelphia, PA	W 36–0		
October 18	Brown	Franklin Field; Philadelphia, PA	L 6–15		
October 22	at Navy	Worden Field; Annapolis, MD	L 6–10		
October 25	Bucknell	Franklin Field; Philadelphia, PA	W 6–5		
November 1	Columbia	Franklin Field; Philadelphia, PA	W 17–0		
November 8	at Harvard	Soldiers' Field; Cambridge, MA (rivalry)	L 0–11		
November 15	Carlisle	Franklin Field; Philadelphia, PA	L 0–5	15,000	
November 27	Cornell	Franklin Field; Philadelphia, PA (rivalry)	W 12–11		
