= 1902 Lehigh Brown and White football team =

American college football season

1902 Lehigh Brown and White football
- Conference: Independent
- Record: 7–3–1
- Head coach: Samuel B. Newton (1st season)

1902 Eastern college football independents records
	Conf.			Overall
Team	W	L	T	W		L		T
Ursinus		–		9	–	0	–	0
Yale		–		11	–	0	–	1
Geneva		–		7	–	0	–	0
Harvard		–		11	–	1	–	0
Princeton		–		8	–	1	–	0
Army		–		6	–	1	–	1
Frankin & Marshall		–		7	–	2	–	0
Dartmouth		–		6	–	2	–	1
Holy Cross		–		6	–	2	–	1
Syracuse		–		6	–	2	–	1
Carlisle		–		8	–	3	–	0
Cornell		–		8	–	3	–	0
Lafayette		–		8	–	3	–	0
Amherst		–		7	–	3	–	0
Penn State		–		7	–	3	–	0
Penn		–		9	–	4	–	0
Lehigh		–		7	–	3	–	1
Vermont		–		5	–	3	–	2
Colgate		–		5	–	3	–	1
NYU		–		5	–	3	–	0
Bucknell		–		6	–	4	–	0
Washington & Jefferson		–		6	–	4	–	0
Columbia		–		6	–	4	–	1
Springfield Training School		–		3	–	2	–	1
Villanova		–		4	–	3	–	0
Brown		–		5	–	4	–	1
Swarthmore		–		6	–	6	–	0
Western U. of Penn.		–		5	–	6	–	1
New Hampshire		–		2	–	3	–	1
Buffalo		–		3	–	5	–	1
Tufts		–		4	–	6	–	1
Dickinson		–		4	–	6	–	0
Fordham		–		2	–	4	–	1
Wesleyan		–		3	–	6	–	1
Rutgers		–		3	–	7	–	0
Navy		–		2	–	7	–	1
Drexel		–		1	–	4	–	1
Temple		–		1	–	4	–	1
Pittsburgh College		–		1	–	6	–	0
Boston College		–		0	–	8	–	0

The 1902 Lehigh Brown and White football team was an American football team that represented Lehigh University as an independent during the 1902 college football season. In its first season under head coach Samuel B. Newton, the team compiled a 7–3–1 record and outscored opponents by a total of 246 to 57.

== Schedule ==
Date	Opponent	Site	Result	Attendance	Source
September 27	at Penn	Franklin Field; Philadelphia, PA	L 0–12		
October 1	at Princeton	University Field; Princeton, NJ	L 0–23		
October 11	Rutgers	Bethlehem, PA	W 34–0		
October 15	at Navy	Worden Field; Annapolis, MD	T 5–5		
October 22	Union (NY)	Bethlehem, PA	W 41–0		
October 25	NYU	Bethlehem, PA	W 46–0		
November 1	at Haverford	Haverford, PA	W 39–0		
November 8	vs. Virginia	American League Park; Washington, DC	W 34–6	3,000	
November 15	Dickinson	Bethlehem, PA	L 0–11		
November 22	at Lafayette	Easton, PA (rivalry)	W 6–0		
November 29	Swarthmore	Bethlehem, PA	W 41–0		
