= 1902 Carlisle Indians football team =

American college football season

1902 Carlisle Indians football
- Conference: Independent
- Record: 8–3
- Head coach: Pop Warner (4th season)
- Captain: Charles Williams
- Home stadium: Indian Field

1902 Eastern college football independents records
	Conf.			Overall
Team	W	L	T	W		L		T
Ursinus		–		9	–	0	–	0
Yale		–		11	–	0	–	1
Geneva		–		7	–	0	–	0
Harvard		–		11	–	1	–	0
Princeton		–		8	–	1	–	0
Army		–		6	–	1	–	1
Franklin & Marshall		–		7	–	2	–	0
Dartmouth		–		6	–	2	–	1
Holy Cross		–		6	–	2	–	1
Syracuse		–		6	–	2	–	1
Carlisle		–		8	–	3	–	0
Cornell		–		8	–	3	–	0
Lafayette		–		8	–	3	–	0
Amherst		–		7	–	3	–	0
Penn State		–		7	–	3	–	0
Penn		–		9	–	4	–	0
Lehigh		–		7	–	3	–	1
Vermont		–		5	–	3	–	2
Colgate		–		5	–	3	–	1
NYU		–		5	–	3	–	0
Bucknell		–		6	–	4	–	0
Washington & Jefferson		–		6	–	4	–	0
Columbia		–		6	–	4	–	1
Springfield Training School		–		3	–	2	–	1
Villanova		–		4	–	3	–	0
Brown		–		5	–	4	–	1
Swarthmore		–		6	–	6	–	0
Western U. of Penn.		–		5	–	6	–	1
New Hampshire		–		2	–	3	–	1
Buffalo		–		3	–	5	–	1
Tufts		–		4	–	6	–	1
Dickinson		–		4	–	6	–	0
Fordham		–		2	–	4	–	1
Wesleyan		–		3	–	6	–	1
Rutgers		–		3	–	7	–	0
Navy		–		2	–	7	–	1
Drexel		–		1	–	4	–	1
Temple		–		1	–	4	–	1
Pittsburgh College		–		1	–	6	–	0
Boston College		–		0	–	8	–	0

The 1902 Carlisle Indians football team represented the Carlisle Indian Industrial School as an independent during the 1902 college football season. Led by fourth-year head coach Pop Warner, the Indians compiled a record of 8–3 and outscored opponents 251 to 51. Charles Williams was the team captain.

== Schedule ==
Date	Time	Opponent	Site	Result	Attendance	Source
September 20		Lebanon Valley	Carlisle, PA	W 48–0	1,000	
September 27		Pennsylvania College	Carlisle, PA	W 25–0	1,000	
October 11		vs. Bucknell	Williamsport, PA	L 0–16	3,000	
October 15		Bloomsburg Normal	Carlisle, PA	W 50–0		
October 18		at Cornell	Percy Field; Ithaca, NY	W 10–6		
October 25		Medico-Chirurgical	Indian Field; Carlisle, PA	W 63–0		
November 1		at Harvard	Soldiers' Field; Boston, MA	L 0–23	>20,000	
November 8		Susquehanna	Carlisle, PA	W 24–0		
November 15		at Penn	Franklin Field; Philadelphia, PA	W 5–0	15,000	
November 22	2:30 p.m.	vs. Virginia	Lafaytte Field; Norfolk, VA	L 5–6		
November 27	2:30 p.m.	at Georgetown	Georgetown Field; Washington, DC	W 21–0	3,500	
