= Samuel L. Moyer =

American football coach, educator (1879–1951)

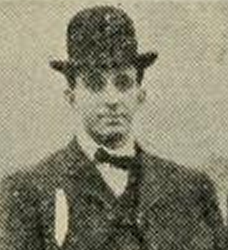
- Moyer cropped from the 1906 Franklin & Marshall football team photo

Biographical details
- Born: April 19, 1879; Bloomingland, Pennsylvania, U.S.
- Died: September 9, 1951 (aged 72); Alameda County, California, U.S.

Playing career
- 1899–1905: Franklin & Marshall

Coaching career (HC unless noted)
- 1906: Franklin & Marshall
- 1922–1937: Piedmont HS (CA)

Head coaching record
- Overall: 3–5–1 (college)

Samuel Linford Moyer (April 19, 1879 – September 9, 1951) was an American football coach and educator. He served as the head football coach at Franklin & Marshall College in Lancaster, Pennsylvania, for one season, in 1906, compiling a record of 3–5–1.

A native of Bucks County, Pennsylvania, Moyer played football at Franklin & Marshall from 1899 to 1905, and was captain of the 1902 Franklin & Marshall football team. He was later a sports coach and physical education director at North Central High School in Spokane, Washington and at Aberdeen High School in Aberdeen, Washington. From 1922 to 1937, he was the football coach and head of the department of physical education at Piedmont High School in Piedmont, California. Moyer died on September 9, 1951, at a hospital in the East Bay.

== Head coaching record ==
=== College ===
Year	Team	Overall	Conference	Standing	Bowl/playoffs
Franklin & Marshall (Independent) (1906)
1906	Franklin & Marshall	3–5–1			
Franklin & Marshall:		3–5–1			
Total:		3–5–1			
