= 1902 Holy Cross football team =

American college football season

1902 Holy Cross football
- Conference: Independent
- Record: 6–2–1
- Head coach: Maurice Connor (5th season)
- Captain: William Baldwin
- Home stadium: Worcester College Grounds, Worcester Oval

1902 Eastern college football independents records
	Conf.			Overall
Team	W	L	T	W		L		T
Ursinus		–		9	–	0	–	0
Yale		–		11	–	0	–	1
Geneva		–		7	–	0	–	0
Harvard		–		11	–	1	–	0
Princeton		–		8	–	1	–	0
Army		–		6	–	1	–	1
Frankin & Marshall		–		7	–	2	–	0
Dartmouth		–		6	–	2	–	1
Holy Cross		–		6	–	2	–	1
Syracuse		–		6	–	2	–	1
Carlisle		–		8	–	3	–	0
Cornell		–		8	–	3	–	0
Lafayette		–		8	–	3	–	0
Amherst		–		7	–	3	–	0
Penn State		–		7	–	3	–	0
Penn		–		9	–	4	–	0
Lehigh		–		7	–	3	–	1
Vermont		–		5	–	3	–	2
Colgate		–		5	–	3	–	1
NYU		–		5	–	3	–	0
Bucknell		–		6	–	4	–	0
Washington & Jefferson		–		6	–	4	–	0
Columbia		–		6	–	4	–	1
Springfield Training School		–		3	–	2	–	1
Villanova		–		4	–	3	–	0
Brown		–		5	–	4	–	1
Swarthmore		–		6	–	6	–	0
Western U. of Penn.		–		5	–	6	–	1
New Hampshire		–		2	–	3	–	1
Buffalo		–		3	–	5	–	1
Tufts		–		4	–	6	–	1
Dickinson		–		4	–	6	–	0
Fordham		–		2	–	4	–	1
Wesleyan		–		3	–	6	–	1
Rutgers		–		3	–	7	–	0
Navy		–		2	–	7	–	1
Drexel		–		1	–	4	–	1
Temple		–		1	–	4	–	1
Pittsburgh College		–		1	–	6	–	0
Boston College		–		0	–	8	–	0

The 1902 Holy Cross football team was an American football team that represented the College of the Holy Cross as an independent in the 1902 college football season.

In their fifth and final year under head coach Maurice Connor, the team compiled a 6–2–1 record. William Baldwin was the team captain.

Holy Cross played its home games at two off-campus fields in Worcester, Massachusetts, the Worcester Oval and the Worcester College Grounds.

== Schedule ==
Date	Opponent	Site	Result	Source
September 22	Massachusetts	Worcester College Grounds; Worcester, MA	T 0–0	
October 4	at Worcester Polytechnic	WPI Campus; Worcester, MA	W 10–0	
October 15	at Amherst	Pratt Field; Amherst, MA	L 5–29	
October 18	Worcester Polytechnic	Worcester Oval; Worcester, MA	W 11–0	
October 25	Vermont	Worcester College Grounds; Worcester, MA	W 11–5	
November 1	at Pittsfield A.C.	Pittsfield Common; Pittsfield, MA	W 2–0	
November 8	at Fordham	Fordham Field; Bronx, NY	W 17–0	
November 15	at Tufts	Tufts Oval; Medford, MA	L 5–11	
November 22	Boston College	South End Grounds; Boston, MA (rivalry)	W 22–0	
