= John Scannell =

American football player, coach, and physician (1872–1951)

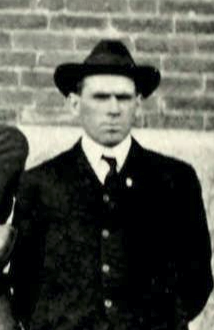
- Scannell in The New Hampshire College Monthly of March 1903

Biographical details
- Born: January 27, 1872; Newmarket, New Hampshire, U.S.
- Died: October 2, 1951 (aged 79); Rialto, California, U.S.
- Education: Phillips Exeter Academy; Colby College; Baltimore Medical College

Playing career
- 1894–1895: Exeter
- 1896–1898: Colby
- 1899–1901: Baltimore
- Positions: Tackle, guard

Coaching career (HC unless noted)
- 1902–1903: New Hampshire

Head coaching record
- Overall: 4–9–2

John Thomas Scannell (January 27, 1872 – October 2, 1951) was an American player and coach of college football, and also a physician. He was the first head coach of the football team now known as the New Hampshire Wildcats.

== Biography ==
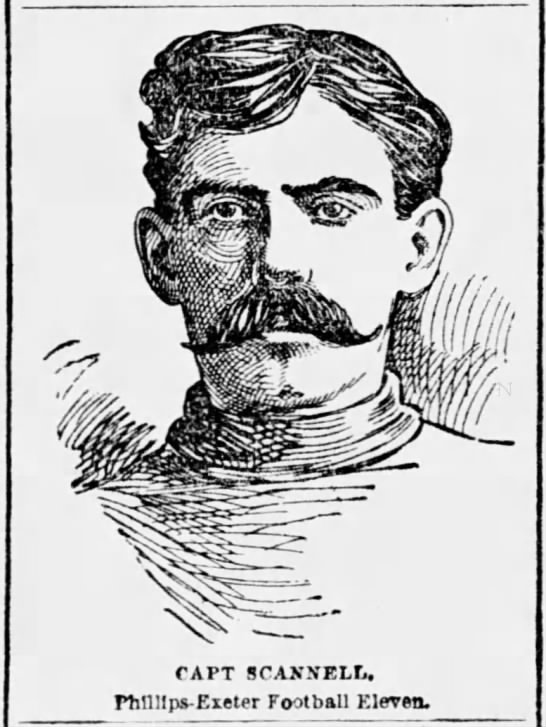
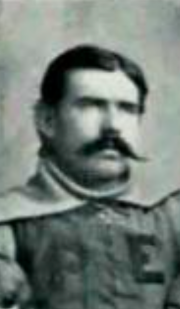
Scannell at Exeter in 1894 (top) and at Colby in 1896

Scannell was from Newmarket, New Hampshire, and was an 1896 graduate of Phillips Exeter Academy. He then attended Colby College in Maine, before earning his medical degree in 1902 from Baltimore Medical College.

Scannell played football at Exeter, Colby and Baltimore, serving as captain on each of those teams. He was also captain of the Exeter baseball team.

Scannell played right tackle for Exeter, including a game against New Hampshire in 1895 during which he scored a touchdown and three conversion kicks. He captained the Exeter squads of 1894 and 1895. At Colby, he played right guard on the teams of 1896, 1897, and 1898, serving as captain in the lattermost season. In 1896, during the first-ever meeting of the Colby and New Hampshire programs, he again scored a touchdown against New Hampshire. He returned to playing right tackle for the Baltimore teams of 1899, 1900, and 1901, serving as captain during his final season with the program.

In 1902, Scannell became the first head coach of the New Hampshire football team at New Hampshire College of Agriculture and the Mechanic Arts in Durham, New Hampshire. The college would become the University of New Hampshire in 1923 and would adopt the Wildcats nickname in 1926. As head coach for the 1902 and 1903 seasons, Scannell compiled a 4–9–2 record.

Scannell died in Rialto, California, in October 1951; he had lived in California for 29 years. He was an elder in the Reorganized Church of Jesus Christ of Latter Day Saints. His wife, Myrtle, had died in 1938. They had two children; a son, John R., who was killed in action in Italy in December 1943, and a daughter, Mary.

== Head coaching record ==
Year	Team	Overall	Conference	Standing	Bowl/playoffs
New Hampshire (Independent) (1902–1903)
1902	New Hampshire	2–3–1			
1903	New Hampshire	2–6–1			
New Hampshire:		4–9–2			
Total:		4–9–2			
