= 1902 Franklin & Marshall Nevonians football team =

American college football season

1902 Franklin & Marshall Nevonians football
- Conference: Independent
- Record: 7–2
- Head coach: John Chalmers (1st season)
- Captain: Samuel L. Moyer
- Home stadium: Williamson Field

1902 Eastern college football independents records
	Conf.			Overall
Team	W	L	T	W		L		T
Ursinus		–		9	–	0	–	0
Yale		–		11	–	0	–	1
Geneva		–		7	–	0	–	0
Harvard		–		11	–	1	–	0
Princeton		–		8	–	1	–	0
Army		–		6	–	1	–	1
Franklin & Marshall		–		7	–	2	–	0
Dartmouth		–		6	–	2	–	1
Holy Cross		–		6	–	2	–	1
Syracuse		–		6	–	2	–	1
Carlisle		–		8	–	3	–	0
Cornell		–		8	–	3	–	0
Lafayette		–		8	–	3	–	0
Amherst		–		7	–	3	–	0
Penn State		–		7	–	3	–	0
Penn		–		9	–	4	–	0
Lehigh		–		7	–	3	–	1
Vermont		–		5	–	3	–	2
Colgate		–		5	–	3	–	1
NYU		–		5	–	3	–	0
Bucknell		–		6	–	4	–	0
Washington & Jefferson		–		6	–	4	–	0
Columbia		–		6	–	4	–	1
Springfield Training School		–		3	–	2	–	1
Villanova		–		4	–	3	–	0
Brown		–		5	–	4	–	1
Swarthmore		–		6	–	6	–	0
Western U. of Penn.		–		5	–	6	–	1
New Hampshire		–		2	–	3	–	1
Buffalo		–		3	–	5	–	1
Tufts		–		4	–	6	–	1
Dickinson		–		4	–	6	–	0
Fordham		–		2	–	4	–	1
Wesleyan		–		3	–	6	–	1
Rutgers		–		3	–	7	–	0
Navy		–		2	–	7	–	1
Drexel		–		1	–	4	–	1
Temple		–		1	–	4	–	1
Pittsburgh College		–		1	–	6	–	0
Boston College		–		0	–	8	–	0

The 1902 Franklin & Marshall Nevonians football team was an American football team that represented Franklin & Marshall College during the 1902 college football season. The team compiled a 7–2 record and outscored opponents by a total of 282 to 54. John Chalmers was the team's head coach.

== Schedule ==
Date	Opponent	Site	Result	Source
October 1	at Penn	Franklin Field; Philadelphia, PA	L 0–16	
October 4	Muhlenberg	Williamson Field; Lancaster, PA	W 69–0	
October 11	Haverford	Williamson Field; Lancaster, PA	W 10–0	
October 18	at Columbian	National League Park; Washington, DC	W 36–0	
October 25	Gallaudet	Williamson Field; Lancaster, PA	W 57–6	
November 1	Lebanon Valley	Williamson Field; Lancaster, PA	W 87–0	
November 8	at Swarthmore	Whittier Field; Swarthmore, PA	W 11–10	
November 15	at Ursinus	Collegeville, PA	L 0–16	
November 27	Gettysburg	Williamson Field; Lancaster, PA	W 12–6	
