= 1902 Swarthmore Quakers football team =

American college football season

1902 Swarthmore Quakers football
- Conference: Independent
- Record: 6–6
- Head coach: George H. Brooke (4th season)
- Home stadium: Whittier Field

1902 Eastern college football independents records
	Conf.			Overall
Team	W	L	T	W		L		T
Ursinus		–		9	–	0	–	0
Yale		–		11	–	0	–	1
Geneva		–		7	–	0	–	0
Harvard		–		11	–	1	–	0
Princeton		–		8	–	1	–	0
Army		–		6	–	1	–	1
Franklin & Marshall		–		7	–	2	–	0
Dartmouth		–		6	–	2	–	1
Holy Cross		–		6	–	2	–	1
Syracuse		–		6	–	2	–	1
Carlisle		–		8	–	3	–	0
Cornell		–		8	–	3	–	0
Lafayette		–		8	–	3	–	0
Amherst		–		7	–	3	–	0
Penn State		–		7	–	3	–	0
Penn		–		9	–	4	–	0
Lehigh		–		7	–	3	–	1
Vermont		–		5	–	3	–	2
Colgate		–		5	–	3	–	1
NYU		–		5	–	3	–	0
Bucknell		–		6	–	4	–	0
Washington & Jefferson		–		6	–	4	–	0
Columbia		–		6	–	4	–	1
Springfield Training School		–		3	–	2	–	1
Villanova		–		4	–	3	–	0
Brown		–		5	–	4	–	1
Swarthmore		–		6	–	6	–	0
Western U. of Penn.		–		5	–	6	–	1
New Hampshire		–		2	–	3	–	1
Buffalo		–		3	–	5	–	1
Tufts		–		4	–	6	–	1
Dickinson		–		4	–	6	–	0
Fordham		–		2	–	4	–	1
Wesleyan		–		3	–	6	–	1
Rutgers		–		3	–	7	–	0
Navy		–		2	–	7	–	1
Drexel		–		1	–	4	–	1
Temple		–		1	–	4	–	1
Pittsburgh College		–		1	–	6	–	0
Boston College		–		0	–	8	–	0

The 1902 Swarthmore Quakers football team was an American football team that represented Swarthmore College as an independent during the 1902 college football season. The team compiled a 6–6 record and outscored opponents by a total of 141 to 127. George H. Brooke was the head coach.

== Schedule ==
Date	Opponent	Site	Result	Source
October 1	at Princeton	University Field; Princeton, NJ	L 0–18	
October 4	Delaware	Whittier Field; Swarthmore, PA	W 12–0	
October 11	at Penn	Philadelphia, PA	L 6–11	
October 15	at Columbia	Polo Grounds; New York, NY	L 0–24	
October 18	St. John's (MD)	Swarthmore, PA	W 23–0	
October 22	at Rutgers	New Brunswick, NJ	W 12–6	
October 25	at Ursinus	Collegeville, PA	L 10–16	
November 1	NYU	Whittier Field; Swarthmore, PA	W 11–0	
November 8	Franklin & Marshall	Whittier Field; Swarthmore, PA	L 10–11	
November 15	Jefferson Medical	Whittier Field; Swarthmore, PA	W 35–0	
November 22	Haverford	Whittier Field; Swarthmore, PA (rivalry)	W 22–0	
November 29	at Lehigh	Bethlehem, PA	L 0–41	
