= Henry Van Hoevenberg =

American football player and coach (1879–1955)

Biographical details
- Born: September 1, 1879; Kingston, New York, U.S.
- Died: September 18, 1955 (aged 76); Oakland, California, U.S.

Playing career
- 1900–1901: Columbia
- Positions: End, quarterback

Coaching career (HC unless noted)
- 1902: Rutgers

Head coaching record
- Overall: 3–7

Accomplishments and honors

Awards
- Third-team All-American (1900)

Henry Van Hoevenberg Jr. (September 1, 1879 – September 18, 1955) was an American football player and coach.

== Early life and football career ==
Van Hoevenberg was born in 1879 at Kingston, New York. He attended Columbia University, where he played for the Columbia Lions football team at the end and quarterback positions from 1900 to 1901. He was selected by Walter Camp as a third-team end on his 1900 College Football All-America Team. He graduated from Columbia in 1902 with a law degree. In September 1902, Van Hoevenberg was hired as the head football coach at Rutgers University, leading the 1902 Rutgers Queensmen football team to a 3–7 record in his only season as head coach.

== Later life and death ==
Van Hoevenberg later moved to Alaska. At the time of the 1910 United States census he was living in Valez Precinct, Alaska, and was employed as a lawyer. He later lived in Sams Valley in Jackson County, Oregon for 27 years, operating a pear orchard and serving as the president of the Oregon State Horticultural Society. The house he built in 1919 in Jackson County has been listed on the National Register of Historic Places as the Henry Van Hoevenberg, Jr. House.

In 1937, he moved to San Francisco and became a labor negotiator. He moved to Seattle in 1939. From 1939 to 1945, he was employed as a labor negotiator by a consortium of salmon cannery owners. In a draft registration card completed in April 1942, Van Hoevenberg indicated that he was employed by the Alaska Salmon Industry, Inc.

Van Hoevenberg was married to Jessamine Adele Bushnell in 1915. They had a daughter, Vivian Isabelle. Van Hoevenberg died in 1955 at Oakland, California. >

== Head coaching record ==
Year	Team	Overall	Conference	Standing	Bowl/playoffs
Rutgers Queensmen (Independent) (1902)
1902	Rutgers	3–7			
Rutgers:		3–7			
Total:		3–7			

== See also ==
- National Register of Historic Places listings in Jackson County, Oregon
