= 1902 NYU Violets football team =

American college football season

1902 NYU Violets football
- Conference: Independent
- Record: 5–3
- Head coach: W. H. Rorke (2nd season)
- Home stadium: Ohio Field

1902 Eastern college football independents records
	Conf.			Overall
Team	W	L	T	W		L		T
Ursinus		–		9	–	0	–	0
Yale		–		11	–	0	–	1
Geneva		–		7	–	0	–	0
Harvard		–		11	–	1	–	0
Princeton		–		8	–	1	–	0
Army		–		6	–	1	–	1
Franklin & Marshall		–		7	–	2	–	0
Dartmouth		–		6	–	2	–	1
Holy Cross		–		6	–	2	–	1
Syracuse		–		6	–	2	–	1
Carlisle		–		8	–	3	–	0
Cornell		–		8	–	3	–	0
Lafayette		–		8	–	3	–	0
Amherst		–		7	–	3	–	0
Penn State		–		7	–	3	–	0
Penn		–		9	–	4	–	0
Lehigh		–		7	–	3	–	1
Vermont		–		5	–	3	–	2
Colgate		–		5	–	3	–	1
NYU		–		5	–	3	–	0
Bucknell		–		6	–	4	–	0
Washington & Jefferson		–		6	–	4	–	0
Columbia		–		6	–	4	–	1
Springfield Training School		–		3	–	2	–	1
Villanova		–		4	–	3	–	0
Brown		–		5	–	4	–	1
Swarthmore		–		6	–	6	–	0
Western U. of Penn.		–		5	–	6	–	1
New Hampshire		–		2	–	3	–	1
Buffalo		–		3	–	5	–	1
Tufts		–		4	–	6	–	1
Dickinson		–		4	–	6	–	0
Fordham		–		2	–	4	–	1
Wesleyan		–		3	–	6	–	1
Rutgers		–		3	–	7	–	0
Navy		–		2	–	7	–	1
Drexel		–		1	–	4	–	1
Temple		–		1	–	4	–	1
Pittsburgh College		–		1	–	6	–	0
Boston College		–		0	–	8	–	0

The 1902 NYU Violets football team was an American football team that represented New York University as an independent during the 1902 college football season. In their second year under head coach W. H. Rorke, the team compiled a 5–3 record.

== Schedule ==
Date	Opponent	Site	Result	Source
October 4	Stevens	Ohio Field; Bronx, NY	W 27–0	
October 11	Ursinus	Ohio Field; Bronx, NY	L 0–16	
October 18	at Trinity (CT)	Trinity Field; Hartford, CT	W 6–0	
October 25	at Lehigh	Bethlehem, PA	L 0–46	
November 1	at Swarthmore	Whittier Field; Swarthmore, PA	L 0–11	
November 8	Rutgers	Ohio Field; Bronx, NY	W 22–0	
November 15	at RPI	Troy, NY	W 18–5	
November 22	Union (NY)	Ohio Field; Bronx, NY	W 18–0	
