= 1902 Princeton Tigers football team =

American college football season

1902 Princeton Tigers football
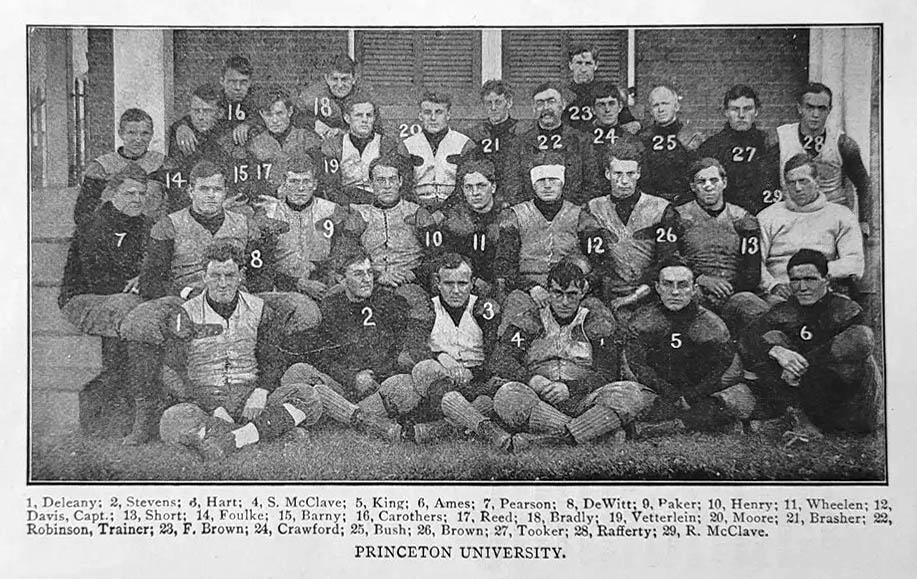
- Conference: Independent
- Record: 8–1
- Head coach: Garrett Cochran (1st season)
- Captain: Ralph Tipton Davis
- Home stadium: University Field

1902 Eastern college football independents records
	Conf.			Overall
Team	W	L	T	W		L		T
Ursinus		–		9	–	0	–	0
Yale		–		11	–	0	–	1
Geneva		–		7	–	0	–	0
Harvard		–		11	–	1	–	0
Princeton		–		8	–	1	–	0
Army		–		6	–	1	–	1
Franklin & Marshall		–		7	–	2	–	0
Dartmouth		–		6	–	2	–	1
Holy Cross		–		6	–	2	–	1
Syracuse		–		6	–	2	–	1
Carlisle		–		8	–	3	–	0
Cornell		–		8	–	3	–	0
Lafayette		–		8	–	3	–	0
Amherst		–		7	–	3	–	0
Penn State		–		7	–	3	–	0
Penn		–		9	–	4	–	0
Lehigh		–		7	–	3	–	1
Vermont		–		5	–	3	–	2
Colgate		–		5	–	3	–	1
NYU		–		5	–	3	–	0
Bucknell		–		6	–	4	–	0
Washington & Jefferson		–		6	–	4	–	0
Columbia		–		6	–	4	–	1
Springfield Training School		–		3	–	2	–	1
Villanova		–		4	–	3	–	0
Brown		–		5	–	4	–	1
Swarthmore		–		6	–	6	–	0
Western U. of Penn.		–		5	–	6	–	1
New Hampshire		–		2	–	3	–	1
Buffalo		–		3	–	5	–	1
Tufts		–		4	–	6	–	1
Dickinson		–		4	–	6	–	0
Fordham		–		2	–	4	–	1
Wesleyan		–		3	–	6	–	1
Rutgers		–		3	–	7	–	0
Navy		–		2	–	7	–	1
Drexel		–		1	–	4	–	1
Temple		–		1	–	4	–	1
Pittsburgh College		–		1	–	6	–	0
Boston College		–		0	–	8	–	0

The 1902 Princeton Tigers football team represented Princeton University in the 1902 college football season. The team finished with an 8–1 record under first-year head coach Garrett Cochran. The Tigers won their first eight games, including seven shutouts, and outscored their opponents by a total of 164 to 17. The team's only loss was in the last game of the season by a 12–5 score against Yale. Princeton guard John DeWitt, who later won the silver medal in the hammer throw at the 1904 Summer Olympics, was selected as a consensus first-team honoree on the 1902 College Football All-America Team.

== Schedule ==
Date	Opponent	Site	Result	Attendance	Source
September 27	Swarthmore	University Field; Princeton, NJ	W 18–0		
October 4	Lehigh	University Field; Princeton, NJ	W 23–0		
October 11	at Navy	Worden Field; Annapolis, MD	W 11–0		
October 15	Haverford	University Field; Princeton, NJ	W 30–0		
October 18	Washington & Jefferson	University Field; Princeton, NJ	W 23–5		
October 22	Dickinson	University Field; Princeton, NJ	W 23–0		
October 25	Columbia	University Field; Princeton, NJ	W 21–0	6,000	
November 1	Cornell	University Field; Princeton, NJ	W 10–0		
November 15	Yale	University Field; Princeton, NJ (rivalry)	L 5–12	20,000	
