= 1902 Brown Bears football team =

American college football season

1902 Brown Bears football
- Conference: Independent
- Record: 5–4–1
- Head coach: J. A. Gammons (1st season)
- Captain: Ancil D. Brown
- Home stadium: Andrews Field

1902 Eastern college football independents records
	Conf.			Overall
Team	W	L	T	W		L		T
Ursinus		–		9	–	0	–	0
Yale		–		11	–	0	–	1
Geneva		–		7	–	0	–	0
Harvard		–		11	–	1	–	0
Princeton		–		8	–	1	–	0
Army		–		6	–	1	–	1
Franklin & Marshall		–		7	–	2	–	0
Dartmouth		–		6	–	2	–	1
Holy Cross		–		6	–	2	–	1
Syracuse		–		6	–	2	–	1
Carlisle		–		8	–	3	–	0
Cornell		–		8	–	3	–	0
Lafayette		–		8	–	3	–	0
Amherst		–		7	–	3	–	0
Penn State		–		7	–	3	–	0
Penn		–		9	–	4	–	0
Lehigh		–		7	–	3	–	1
Vermont		–		5	–	3	–	2
Colgate		–		5	–	3	–	1
NYU		–		5	–	3	–	0
Bucknell		–		6	–	4	–	0
Washington & Jefferson		–		6	–	4	–	0
Columbia		–		6	–	4	–	1
Springfield Training School		–		3	–	2	–	1
Villanova		–		4	–	3	–	0
Brown		–		5	–	4	–	1
Swarthmore		–		6	–	6	–	0
Western U. of Penn.		–		5	–	6	–	1
New Hampshire		–		2	–	3	–	1
Buffalo		–		3	–	5	–	1
Tufts		–		4	–	6	–	1
Dickinson		–		4	–	6	–	0
Fordham		–		2	–	4	–	1
Wesleyan		–		3	–	6	–	1
Rutgers		–		3	–	7	–	0
Navy		–		2	–	7	–	1
Drexel		–		1	–	4	–	1
Temple		–		1	–	4	–	1
Pittsburgh College		–		1	–	6	–	0
Boston College		–		0	–	8	–	0

The 1902 Brown Bears football team represented Brown University as an independent during the 1902 college football season. Led by first-year head coach J. A. Gammons, Brown compiled a record of 5–4–1.

== Schedule ==
Date	Opponent	Site	Result	Source
October 1	Vermont	Andrews Field; Providence, RI	T 0–0	
October 4	Wesleyan	Andrews Field; Providence, RI	W 5–0	
October 11	Yale	Andrews Field; Providence, RI	L 0–10	
October 18	at Penn	Franklin Field; Philadelphia, PA	W 15–6	
October 25	at Harvard	Harvard Stadium; Boston, MA	L 0–6	
November 1	at Lafayette	March Field; Easton, PA	L 5–6	
November 5	Tufts	Andrews Field; Providence, RI	W 45–12	
November 8	at Columbia	Polo Grounds; New York, NY	W 28–0	
November 15	Springfield Training School	Andrews Field; Providence, RI	W 11–0	
November 23	at Dartmouth	Varick Park; Manchester, NH	L 6–12	
