= 1902 New Hampshire football team =

American college football season

1902 New Hampshire football
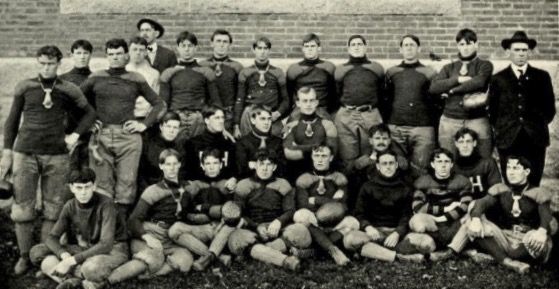
- 1902 team photo; several players can be seen with nose armor protectors around their necks
- Conference: Independent
- Record: 2–3–1
- Head coach: John Scannell (1st season)
- Captain: Everett G. Davis
- Home stadium: Central Park, Dover, NH; College grounds, Durham, NH

1902 Eastern college football independents records
	Conf.			Overall
Team	W	L	T	W		L		T
Ursinus		–		9	–	0	–	0
Yale		–		11	–	0	–	1
Geneva		–		7	–	0	–	0
Harvard		–		11	–	1	–	0
Princeton		–		8	–	1	–	0
Army		–		6	–	1	–	1
Franklin & Marshall		–		7	–	2	–	0
Dartmouth		–		6	–	2	–	1
Holy Cross		–		6	–	2	–	1
Syracuse		–		6	–	2	–	1
Carlisle		–		8	–	3	–	0
Cornell		–		8	–	3	–	0
Lafayette		–		8	–	3	–	0
Amherst		–		7	–	3	–	0
Penn State		–		7	–	3	–	0
Penn		–		9	–	4	–	0
Lehigh		–		7	–	3	–	1
Vermont		–		5	–	3	–	2
Colgate		–		5	–	3	–	1
NYU		–		5	–	3	–	0
Bucknell		–		6	–	4	–	0
Washington & Jefferson		–		6	–	4	–	0
Columbia		–		6	–	4	–	1
Springfield Training School		–		3	–	2	–	1
Villanova		–		4	–	3	–	0
Brown		–		5	–	4	–	1
Swarthmore		–		6	–	6	–	0
Western U. of Penn.		–		5	–	6	–	1
New Hampshire		–		2	–	3	–	1
Buffalo		–		3	–	5	–	1
Tufts		–		4	–	6	–	1
Dickinson		–		4	–	6	–	0
Fordham		–		2	–	4	–	1
Wesleyan		–		3	–	6	–	1
Rutgers		–		3	–	7	–	0
Navy		–		2	–	7	–	1
Drexel		–		1	–	4	–	1
Temple		–		1	–	4	–	1
Pittsburgh College		–		1	–	6	–	0
Boston College		–		0	–	8	–	0

The 1902 New Hampshire football team (Note: The school did not adopt the Wildcats nickname until February 1926; before then, they were generally referred to as "the blue and white".) was an American football team that represented New Hampshire College of Agriculture and the Mechanic Arts (Note: The school was often referred to as New Hampshire College or New Hampshire State College in newspapers of the era.) during the 1902 college football season—the school became the University of New Hampshire in 1923. The team finished with a record of 2–3–1, under direction of the program's first head coach, John Scannell.

== Schedule ==
Scoring during this era awarded five points for a touchdown, one point for a conversion kick (extra point), and five points for a field goal. Teams played in the one-platoon system and the forward pass was not yet legal. Games were played in two halves rather than four quarters.

Date	Opponent	Site	Result	Source
September 24	at Exeter Academy	Exeter, NH	T 0–0	
October 4	at Andover Academy	Andover, MA	L 0–28	
October 11	at Bowdoin	Whittier Field; Brunswick, ME	L 5–35	
October 18	at Dover Athletic Assoc.	Central Park; Dover, NH	W 23–0	
October 25	Boston College	Central Park; Dover, NH	W 10–6	
October 29	Colby	Durham, NH	L 5–11	

The New Hampshire College Monthly is clear that the Boston College game was played on Saturday, October 25, in Dover; College Football Data Warehouse and the University's media guide list the game as having been played on October 24 in Durham.

In addition to the varsity games listed above, New Hampshire's second team (reserves) lost to the Exeter Academy second team, 5–0, and defeated a team of Exeter Academy seniors, 32–6.
