= 1902 Penn State football team =

American college football season

1902 Penn State football
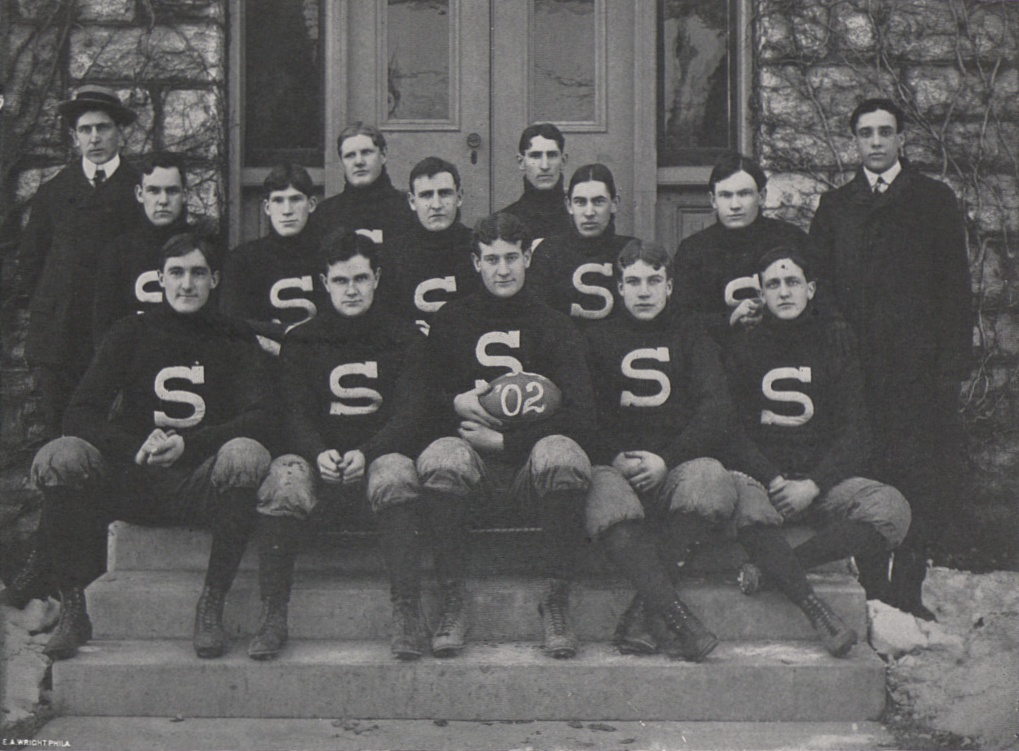
- Conference: Independent
- Record: 7–3
- Head coach: Pop Golden (3rd season)
- Captain: Ralph Cummings
- Home stadium: Beaver Field

1902 Eastern college football independents records
	Conf.			Overall
Team	W	L	T	W		L		T
Ursinus		–		9	–	0	–	0
Yale		–		11	–	0	–	1
Geneva		–		7	–	0	–	0
Harvard		–		11	–	1	–	0
Princeton		–		8	–	1	–	0
Army		–		6	–	1	–	1
Franklin & Marshall		–		7	–	2	–	0
Dartmouth		–		6	–	2	–	1
Holy Cross		–		6	–	2	–	1
Syracuse		–		6	–	2	–	1
Carlisle		–		8	–	3	–	0
Cornell		–		8	–	3	–	0
Lafayette		–		8	–	3	–	0
Amherst		–		7	–	3	–	0
Penn State		–		7	–	3	–	0
Penn		–		9	–	4	–	0
Lehigh		–		7	–	3	–	1
Vermont		–		5	–	3	–	2
Colgate		–		5	–	3	–	1
NYU		–		5	–	3	–	0
Bucknell		–		6	–	4	–	0
Washington & Jefferson		–		6	–	4	–	0
Columbia		–		6	–	4	–	1
Springfield Training School		–		3	–	2	–	1
Villanova		–		4	–	3	–	0
Brown		–		5	–	4	–	1
Swarthmore		–		6	–	6	–	0
Western U. of Penn.		–		5	–	6	–	1
New Hampshire		–		2	–	3	–	1
Buffalo		–		3	–	5	–	1
Tufts		–		4	–	6	–	1
Dickinson		–		4	–	6	–	0
Fordham		–		2	–	4	–	1
Wesleyan		–		3	–	6	–	1
Rutgers		–		3	–	7	–	0
Navy		–		2	–	7	–	1
Drexel		–		1	–	4	–	1
Temple		–		1	–	4	–	1
Pittsburgh College		–		1	–	6	–	0
Boston College		–		0	–	8	–	0

The 1902 Penn State football team was an American football team that represented Pennsylvania State College—now known as Pennsylvania State University–as an independent during the 1902 college football season. The team was coached by Pop Golden and played its home games in Beaver Field in State College, Pennsylvania.

== Schedule ==
Date	Opponent	Site	Result	Source
September 20	Dickinson Seminary	Beaver Field; State College, PA	W 27–0	
September 27	Western University of Pennsylvania	Bellefonte, PA (rivalry)	W 27–0	
October 4	at Penn	Franklin Field; Philadelphia, PA	L 0–17	
October 11	Villanova	Beaver Field; State College, PA	W 32–0	
October 18	at Yale	Yale Field; New Haven, CT	L 0–11	
October 25	Susquehanna	Beaver Field; State College, PA	W 55–0	
November 1	at Navy	Worden Field; Annapolis, MD	W 6–0	
November 8	Gettysburg	Beaver Field; University Park, PA	W 37–0	
November 22	at Dickinson	Carlisle, PA	W 23–0	
November 27	at Steelton YMCA	Steelton, PA	L 5–6	
