= 1902 Cornell Big Red football team =

American college football season

1902 Cornell Big Red football
- Conference: Independent
- Record: 8–3
- Head coach: Raymond Starbuck (1st season)
- Captain: Bill Warner
- Home stadium: Percy Field

1902 Eastern college football independents records
	Conf.			Overall
Team	W	L	T	W		L		T
Ursinus		–		9	–	0	–	0
Yale		–		11	–	0	–	1
Geneva		–		7	–	0	–	0
Harvard		–		11	–	1	–	0
Princeton		–		8	–	1	–	0
Army		–		6	–	1	–	1
Franklin & Marshall		–		7	–	2	–	0
Dartmouth		–		6	–	2	–	1
Holy Cross		–		6	–	2	–	1
Syracuse		–		6	–	2	–	1
Carlisle		–		8	–	3	–	0
Cornell		–		8	–	3	–	0
Lafayette		–		8	–	3	–	0
Amherst		–		7	–	3	–	0
Penn State		–		7	–	3	–	0
Penn		–		9	–	4	–	0
Lehigh		–		7	–	3	–	1
Vermont		–		5	–	3	–	2
Colgate		–		5	–	3	–	1
NYU		–		5	–	3	–	0
Bucknell		–		6	–	4	–	0
Washington & Jefferson		–		6	–	4	–	0
Columbia		–		6	–	4	–	1
Springfield Training School		–		3	–	2	–	1
Villanova		–		4	–	3	–	0
Brown		–		5	–	4	–	1
Swarthmore		–		6	–	6	–	0
Western U. of Penn.		–		5	–	6	–	1
New Hampshire		–		2	–	3	–	1
Buffalo		–		3	–	5	–	1
Tufts		–		4	–	6	–	1
Dickinson		–		4	–	6	–	0
Fordham		–		2	–	4	–	1
Wesleyan		–		3	–	6	–	1
Rutgers		–		3	–	7	–	0
Navy		–		2	–	7	–	1
Drexel		–		1	–	4	–	1
Temple		–		1	–	4	–	1
Pittsburgh College		–		1	–	6	–	0
Boston College		–		0	–	8	–	0

The 1902 Cornell Big Red football team was an American football team that represented Cornell University during the 1902 college football season. In their second season under head coach Raymond Starbuck, the Big Red compiled an 8–3 record, shut out 7 of 11 opponents, and outscored all opponents by a combined total of 324 to 38. Guard Bill Warner was selected by Caspar Whitney as a first-team player, and by Walter Camp as a second-team player, on the 1902 College Football All-America Team.

== Schedule ==
Date	Opponent	Site	Result	Source
September 27	Colgate	Percy Field; Ithaca, NY (rivalry)	W 5–0	
October 1	Rochester	Percy Field; Ithaca, NY	W 31–0	
October 4	Union (NY)	Percy Field; Ithaca, NY	W 42–0	
October 8	Hobart	Percy Field; Ithaca, NY	W 57–0	
October 11	Williams	Percy Field; Ithaca, NY	W 37–6	
October 18	Carlisle	Percy Field; Ithaca, NY	L 6–10	
October 25	Oberlin	Percy Field; Ithaca, NY	W 57–0	
November 1	at Princeton	University Field; Princeton, NJ	L 0–10	
November 8	Washington & Jefferson	Percy Field; Ithaca, NY	W 50–0	
November 15	Lafayette	Percy Field; Ithaca, NY	W 28–0	
November 27	at Penn	Franklin Field; Philadelphia, PA (rivalry)	L 11–12	
