= 1902 Buffalo football team =

American college football season

1902 Buffalo football
- Conference: Independent
- Record: 3–5–1
- Head coach: None
- Captain: William DeCue
- Home stadium: Buffalo Athletic Field

1902 Eastern college football independents records
	Conf.			Overall
Team	W	L	T	W		L		T
Ursinus		–		9	–	0	–	0
Yale		–		11	–	0	–	1
Geneva		–		7	–	0	–	0
Harvard		–		11	–	1	–	0
Princeton		–		8	–	1	–	0
Army		–		6	–	1	–	1
Franklin & Marshall		–		7	–	2	–	0
Dartmouth		–		6	–	2	–	1
Holy Cross		–		6	–	2	–	1
Syracuse		–		6	–	2	–	1
Carlisle		–		8	–	3	–	0
Cornell		–		8	–	3	–	0
Lafayette		–		8	–	3	–	0
Amherst		–		7	–	3	–	0
Penn State		–		7	–	3	–	0
Penn		–		9	–	4	–	0
Lehigh		–		7	–	3	–	1
Vermont		–		5	–	3	–	2
Colgate		–		5	–	3	–	1
NYU		–		5	–	3	–	0
Bucknell		–		6	–	4	–	0
Washington & Jefferson		–		6	–	4	–	0
Columbia		–		6	–	4	–	1
Springfield Training School		–		3	–	2	–	1
Villanova		–		4	–	3	–	0
Brown		–		5	–	4	–	1
Swarthmore		–		6	–	6	–	0
Western U. of Penn.		–		5	–	6	–	1
New Hampshire		–		2	–	3	–	1
Buffalo		–		3	–	5	–	1
Tufts		–		4	–	6	–	1
Dickinson		–		4	–	6	–	0
Fordham		–		2	–	4	–	1
Wesleyan		–		3	–	6	–	1
Rutgers		–		3	–	7	–	0
Navy		–		2	–	7	–	1
Drexel		–		1	–	4	–	1
Temple		–		1	–	4	–	1
Pittsburgh College		–		1	–	6	–	0
Boston College		–		0	–	8	–	0

The 1902 Buffalo football team represented the University of Buffalo as an independent in the 1902 college football season. The team had no coach and the team was 3–5–1 overall for the year.

== Schedule ==
Date	Opponent	Site	Result	Source
September 27	Masten Park High School	Buffalo Athletic Field; Buffalo, NY	W 6–0	
October 4	Bucknell	Buffalo Athletic Field; Buffalo, NY	L 0–29	
October 11	at Columbia	Polo Grounds; New York, NY	L 0–5	
October 18	Hobart	Buffalo Athletic Field; Buffalo, NY	T 0–0	
October 25	at Western Reserve	Cleveland, OH	L 0–22	
November 8	Rochester	Buffalo Athletic Field; Buffalo, NY	W 6–0	
November 11	at Alfred	Alfred, NY	L 0–12	
November 21	Niagara	Buffalo Athletic Field; Buffalo, NY	W 28–0	
November 27	Oakdale Athletic Club	Buffalo Athletic Field; Buffalo, NY	L 0–10	
