= List of Germantown Academy people =

This List of Germantown Academy people lists notable alumni of Germantown Academy, a private school in Philadelphia, Pennsylvania.

- Kyle Garland (Class of 2018), professional decathlete who competed for the United States in the 2023 World Athletics Championships
- Sierra Schmidt (attended 2010–2015), competitive freestyle swimmer, competitor and record setter in the 800m freestyle event of the 2015 Pan American Games
- Dan Lovitz (Class of 2010), professional soccer player, currently plays for Nashville SC in Major League Soccer, 13 appearances for the United States national team in 2019
- Cameron Ayers (Class of 2010), professional basketball player who currently plays for the Reno Bighorns of the NBA Development League. 2014 graduate of (Bucknell University)
- Maggie Lucas (Class of 2010), professional women's basketball player, currently plays for the Indiana Fever, two-time Big 10 Player of the Year at (Penn State University)
- Jen Hoy (Class of 2009), professional women's soccer player, currently plays for the Chicago Red Stars, member of the U-23 Women's World Cup team (Princeton University)
- Caroline Doty (Class of 2008), basketball player (University of Connecticut Huskies)
- Fran Crippen (Class of 2002), US national team swimmer; 6-time national champion
- Matt Walsh (Class of 2002), NBA basketball player (New Jersey Nets); played for University of Florida Gators
- Jarrod Spector (Class of 1999), Tony Award nominee for his performance in Beautiful: The Carole King Musical
- Maddy Crippen (Class of 1998), United States 2000 Summer Olympics swim team, 3-time national champion
- Bradley Cooper (Class of 1993), Oscar-nominated film and TV actor (Sex and the City, Alias, Wedding Crashers, Wet Hot American Summer, The Hangover, and Silver Linings Playbook)
- Brian Klugman (Class of 1993), film and TV actor, scriptwriter (Psych, Tron: Legacy)
- Alvin Williams (Class of 1993), NBA basketball player (Toronto Raptors) and sports commentator (Comcast SportsNet)
- Michael F. Gerber (Class of 1990), Pennsylvania State Representative
- Deirdre Quinn (Class of 1989), actress (Miss Congeniality, The Diary of Ellen Rimbauer (film), Heroes)
- Trina Radke (Class of 1989), Olympic swimmer, 1988 Olympics, US national champion, American record holder, and U.S. team captain
- Christine Rawak (Class of 1988), former athletic director at the University of Delaware
- David Wharton (Class of 1987), Olympic silver medalist (Seoul, 1988) in the 200 m swimming Individual Medley
- Mike Richter (Class of 1985), New York Rangers goaltender
- Randolph Cohen (Class of 1983), financial economist, associate professor at the MIT Sloan School of Management
- Eric Lipton (Class of 1983), Pulitzer Prize-winning journalist and author, currently with the New York Times
- Brian L. Roberts (Class of 1977), CEO of Comcast
- Timothy Stack (Class of 1974), actor, writer and producer (Parker Lewis Can't Lose, Son of the Beach, My Name is Earl)
- Eric Minkin (Class of 1968), American-Israeli basketball player
- Edward Piszek, trustee, co-founder of Mrs. Paul's Kitchens
- Martin "Cruz" (William) Smith (Class of 1960), novelist (Gorky Park)
- Frederick Crews, literary critic, University of California, Berkeley professor, and noted anti-Freudian scholar
- Bill Tilden (Class of 1910), professional tennis player
- Charles Darrow (Class of 1907), claimed inventor of Monopoly board game
- George Washington Hill (Class of 1899, didn't graduate), president of American Tobacco Company 1925–1946
- Charles Day (Class of 1895), consulting engineer and co-founder of Day & Zimmermann
- Owen Josephus Roberts (Class of 1891), associate justice of the United States Supreme Court
- Thomas Sovereign Gates (Class of 1889), University of Pennsylvania president
- Howard Henry (Class of 1889), All-American halfback for the 1903 Princeton Tigers football team, U.S. Army captain
- James DeWolf Perry (Class of 1887), 7th bishop of Rhode Island, presiding bishop of the Episcopal Church (1930–1937)
- Witmer Stone (Class of 1883), ornithologist, botanist, mammalogist
- Frederick Winslow Taylor (did not graduate), efficiency expert; inventor of scientific management
- Owen Wister (Class of 1878, but did not graduate), author of The Virginian and other classics of Western fiction
- Alfred C. Harmer (Class of 1843), U.S. congressman and shoe manufacturer
- Robert Montgomery Bird (Class of 1824), physician; playwright
- Sidney George Fisher (Class of c. 1820), noted diarist, lawyer, orator, and gentleman
- George Washington Parke Custis (attended 1790s), step-grandson and adopted son of President George Washington
- Hilary Baker (attended 1760s), mayor of Philadelphia (1796–1798), son of Headmaster Hilarius Becker
