= Lynn Public Schools =

School district in Massachusetts, USA

Location
- 100 Bennett Street, Lynn, MA 01905 United States

District information
- Type: Public
- Grades: K-12
- Superintendent: vacant
- Asst. superintendent(s): Debra Ruggiero, Maricel Goris, Molly Cohen
- Schools: 27
- Budget: $233,282,178 total $13,666 per pupil (2016)

Students and staff
- Students: 17,447 (June 2024)
- Teachers: 985
- Student–teacher ratio: 14.6 to 1

Other information
- Average SAT scores: 496 verbal 494 math 990 total (2017-2018)
- Website: Lynn Public Schools

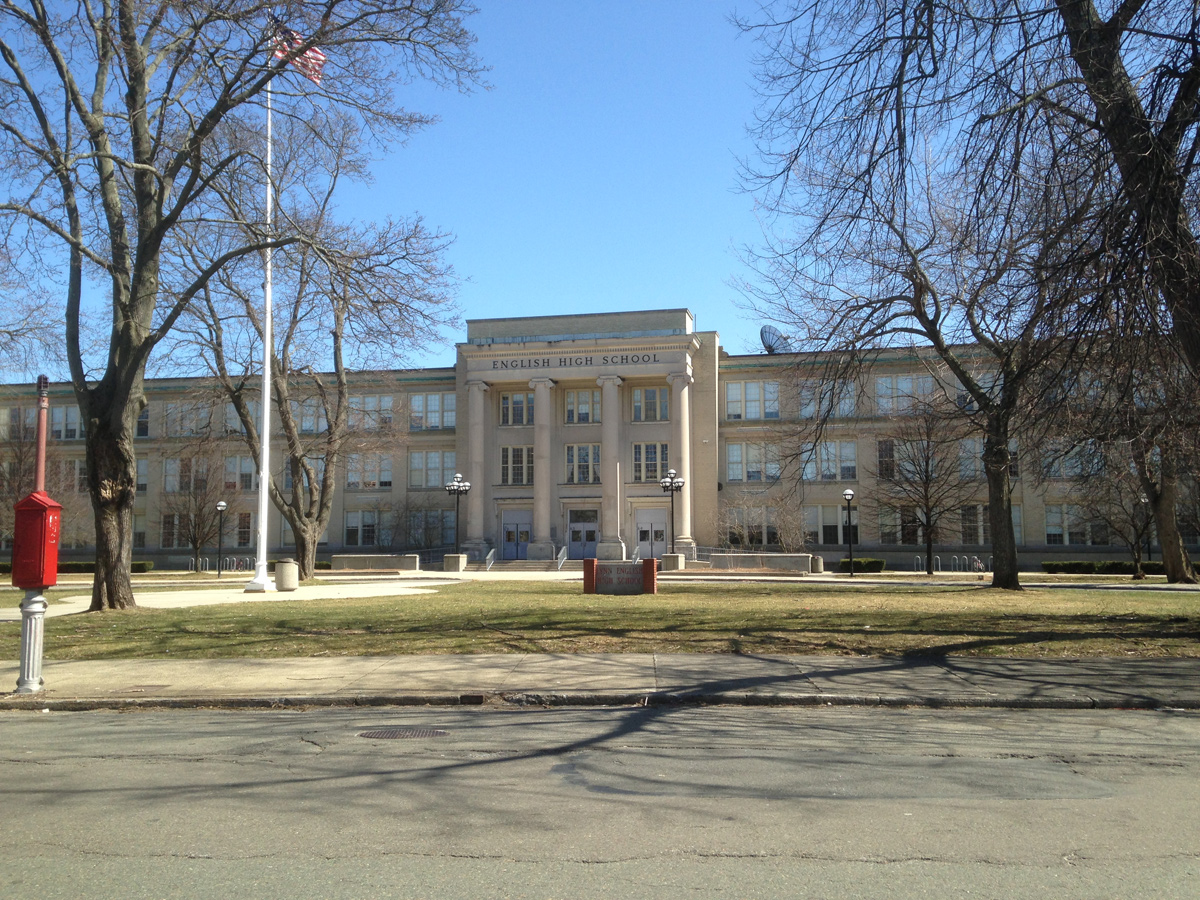
Lynn English High School

Lynn Public Schools is a school district headquartered in Lynn, Massachusetts. As of 2014, it is the fifth-largest school district in Massachusetts.

== History ==
In 2003 the district began a partnership with Gordon College of Wenham; college students volunteered at the district's schools. The college stated opposition to a U.S. federal government protection on the hiring of gays and lesbians; in 2014, citing that opposition, Lynn Public Schools ended the partnership.

In or about 2011, Lynn was where the United Nations High Commission for Refugees relocated people from all over the world. With these relocations, the Lynn school district faced a growing number of refugee students who had little or no education and who may speak languages for which there is no translator.

In 2017 Lynn voters rejected a proposal to build two new middle schools in the growing school district.

In 2017 two long-standing School Committee members announced they would not run for re-election. The 2017 election for Lynn School Committee was active with multiple debates and about a dozen candidates. Big issues included the need for new schools and charter school expansion in the city. Brian K. Castellano and Michael A. Satterwhite won seats on the Committee in the 2017 election and all other incumbents were re-elected.

In 2018 the district hired the first black Superintendent of Schools for the City of Lynn. Patrick Tutwiler was the Deputy Superintendent before being selected from a large pool of candidates to become Superintendent. Tutwiler resigned from his position in the summer of 2022.

In 2018 the district offered free breakfast and lunch to all students and incorporated its first Operating Protocols.

In 2019 the district closed the Early Childhood Center to transition Lynn Vocational Technical Institute into a Senior/Junior High School. The Discovery Academy was created at LVTI and for the 19/20 school year, 305 7th grade students were accepted into the 8th-grade program.

== Schools ==
=== Secondary schools ===
7-12 schools:

- Fecteau-Leary Junior/Senior High School

High schools (9-12):

- Lynn Classical High School
- Lynn English High School
- Frederick Douglass Collegiate Academy - Early College Program High School at North Shore Community College (opened Fall 2022)

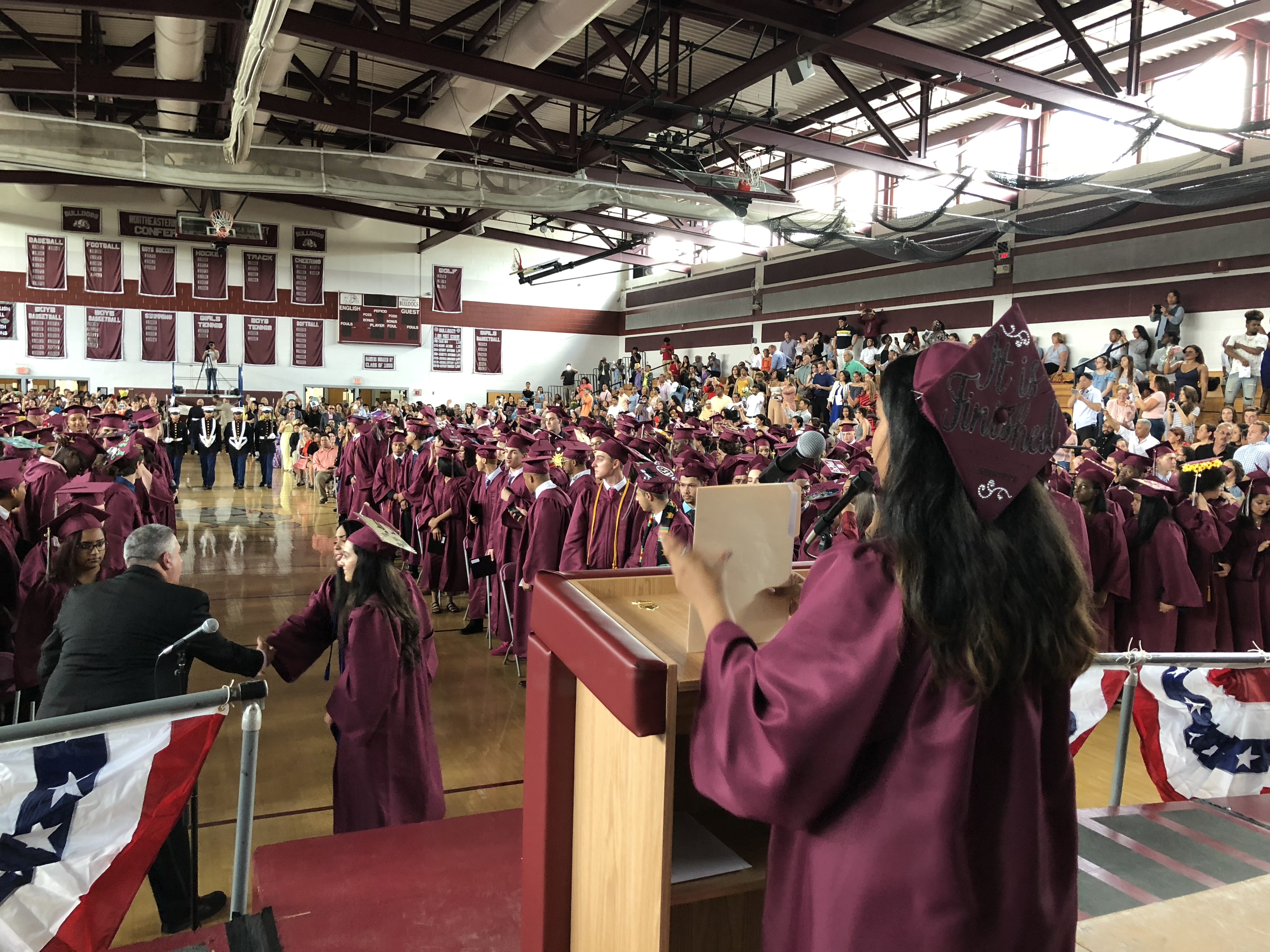

8-12 schools:

- Lynn Vocational and Technical Institute

Middle schools (6-8):

- Breed Middle School
- Thurgood Marshall Middle School
- Pickering Middle School

=== Primary and early childhood schools ===
Elementary schools (PK-5):

- Julia F. Callahan Elementary School
- William P. Connery Elementary School
- Alphonse M. Drewicz Elementary School
- E.J. Harrington Elementary School

Elementary schools (K-5):

- James Edward Aborn Elementary School
- Brickett Elementary School
- Cobbet Elementary School
- Edward A. Sisson Elementary School
- Lynn Woods Elementary School
- Sewell-Anderson Elementary School
- Capt. William G. Shoemaker Elementary School
- Lincoln-Thompson Elementary School
- Hood Elementary School
- Fallon Elementary School
- Ingalls Elementary School
- Washington STEM School

Elementary schools (1-5):

- Ford Elementary School
- Tracy Elementary School

Early childhood centers:

- Lynn Early Childhood Center (Closed in June 2019)
- Virginia Barton (formerly "Little Lynners") Early Childhood Center, opened Fall 2022

== Controversy ==
In August 2018, the U.S. Department of Education said Lynn Public Schools violated the civil rights of a student with disabilities due to its school policing practices, finding that the district inappropriately involved a school police officer in a routine discipline problem that extended beyond the cop’s role in maintaining public safety.

In August 2018, a coach was caught on Snap Chat saying "White Power" and putting up her fist. Superintendent Tutwiler wrote, “The Lynn Public Schools is a wonderfully diverse school community with a longstanding tradition of inclusivity and deep respect for the differences among the students and families we serve,’’ he wrote. “Any comments or behaviors that depart from this tradition are in fact an assault on our core values. We are taking this matter seriously.”

In June 2019, the coach that was caught on Snap Chat saying "White Power" and putting up her fist was rehired as the cheerleading coach of Lynn English. School Committee member Michael Satterwhite said the committee has policies on personnel and it’s up to the superintendent to enforce them. He said Tutwiler resolved the issue in the fashion he thought best and informed committee members of his decision on Monday. “We have a diverse body of educators and students, and our focus should never be on the actions or inactions of a trusted adult,” said Satterwhite. “One second of the appearance of inappropriate behavior or gestures can alter your life. Almost immediately after the situation, Mrs. Cuevas took appropriate actions to understand the situation and to grow from it. Dr. Tutwiler, with other school officials, after meeting with Mrs. Cuevas and hearing from the community, thought it would be appropriate to rehire Mrs. Cuevas. I support Dr. Tutwiler and this decision.”

== Notable Graduates ==
Harry Agganis, Major League Baseball first baseman

Edward Farnsworth, All-American college football player

Ken Hill, Major League Baseball pitcher

Glenn Ordway, sports commentator

Lou Tsioropoulos, professional basketball player

Gasper Urban, football player
