= Henry Holt =

Henry Holt may refer to:

- Henry Holt (North Dakota politician) (1887–1944), lieutenant governor
- Henry Holt (publisher) (1840–1926), American publisher and author
  - Henry Holt and Company, Holt's publishing company
- Henry E. Holt (born 1929), American astronomer
- Henry H. Holt (1831–1898), Michigan politician, lieutenant governor
- Henry W. Holt (1864–1947), Chief Justice of the Virginia Supreme Court
- Henry Holt (American football) (1881–1955), American football player and banker

== See also ==
- Harry Holt (disambiguation)
