= John Guiney =

John Guiney may refer to:

- John Guiney (politician) (1868–1931), Irish nationalist politician and MP in the House of Commons
- John Guiney (athlete) (1882–1912), American shot putter
