= D. R. Brown =

D. R. Brown may refer to:

- Daniel Russell Brown (1848–1919), American politician
- D. R. Brown (American football), American football coach
