= Leigh C. Turner =

American football player and coach (1879–1971)

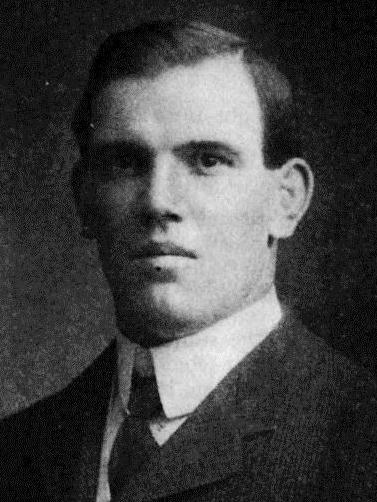

Biographical details
- Born: February 11, 1879; Ross, Ohio, U.S.
- Died: January 1971 (aged 91)

Playing career

Football
- 1901: Miami (OH)
- 1903: Dartmouth

Baseball
- 1904: Michigan
- Positions: Tackle (football); Catcher, center fielder (baseball)

Coaching career (HC unless noted)

Football
- 1904: Hamilton
- 1905: Michigan (assistant)
- 1906: Syracuse (assistant)
- 1907: Purdue

Head coaching record
- Overall: 5–8

Accomplishments and honors

Awards
- Second-team All-American (1903)

Leigh Cilley "Old Head" Turner (February 11, 1879 – January 1971) was an American football player and coach. He served as the head football coach at Hamilton College for one season in 1904 and at Purdue University for one season in 1907, compiling a career college football record of 5–8. Turner played football at Dartmouth College and worked as an assistant coach at the University of Michigan under Fielding H. Yost in 1905. He graduated from the University of Michigan Law School in 1906.

== Undergraduate student and athlete ==
Turner was born on February 11, 1879, in Ross, Ohio. Nicknamed "Old Head", he attended Miami University, where he was a member of the football team. He lettered in football in 1901. That year, he played tackle and was team captain and under coach Thomas Hazzard. The team went 1–3–1 with the only victory being a 23–6 victory over Antioch. He later transferred to Dartmouth College, where he lettered in football in 1903. He helped the 1903 Big Green football team, coached by Fred Folsom, to a 9–1 record including the school's first-ever win over Harvard. Turner scored both touchdowns in the 11–0 victory over Harvard. After the 1903 season he was named 2nd team All-American by Caspar Whitney in Outing magazine and 3rd team All-American by Walter Camp in Collier's Weekly. Included on the 1903 All-American Team were several other Big Green teammates including Henry Hooper at center, Joseph Gilman at guard and Kyron Witham at quarterback.

== Law school ==
Turner attended the University of Michigan Law School where he graduated in 1906. He was active student including being a member of Phi Delta Phi legal fraternity and played center field and catcher on the Michigan baseball team. Turner helped the 1904 Wolverines to a 10–5 record finishing 4–5 in the conference.

== College coach ==
After graduating from Dartmouth, Turner became head football coach of Hamilton College for the 1904 season. That season, he completed a 5–3 record. The following year, while he was attending law school, he became an assistant football coach at the University of Michigan under Fielding H. Yost. As part of his duties he was in charge of the freshman team. In 1906, after he graduated from Michigan Law School, he moved to Syracuse, New York, to practice law. In the fall of that year he became an assistant football coach at Syracuse University under Hall of Fame coach Frank "Buck" O'Neill. In 1906 he became head football coach at Purdue University, where he completed a 0–5 record in his only year coaching the Boilermakers. His team only scored 10 points the entire season and he was replaced by Frederick A. Speik.

== Head coaching record ==
Year	Team	Overall	Conference	Standing	Bowl/playoffs
Hamilton Continentals (Independent) (1904)
1904	Hamilton	5–3			
Hamilton:		5–3			
Purdue Boilermakers (Western Conference) (1907)
1907	Purdue	0–5	0–3	T–6th	
Purdue:		0–5	0–3		
Total:		5–8			
