= 1902 college football rankings =

- Season: 1902
- Bowl season: 1902–03 bowl games
- End of season champions: Yale

The 1902 college football season rankings included a ranking by Caspar Whitney for Outing and a top-sixteen rating in The Sun.

== Caspar Whitney ==
Writing for Outing, alongside his All-America Eleven for 1902, Caspar Whitney ranked the top twenty-eight teams in the country at the conclusion of the season.

Whitney is designated by the National Collegiate Athletic Association (NCAA) as a "major selector" of national championships, and his contemporary rankings in Outing for 1905–1907 are included in the NCAA college football records book.

Rank	Team	Record
1	Yale	11–0–1
2	Harvard	11–1
3	Army	6–1–1

== The Sun ==
In December 1902, New York City newspaper The Sun published a ranking of football teams.

Rank	Team	Record
1	Yale	11–0–1
2	Princeton	8–1
3	Harvard	11–1
4	Army	6–1–1
5	Penn	9–4
6	Carlisle	8–3
7	Cornell	8–3
8	Bucknell	6–4
9	Amherst	7–3
10	Dartmouth	6–2–1
11	Navy	2–7–1
12	Lafayette	8–3
13	Brown	5–4–1
14	Syracuse	6–2–1
15	Columbia	6–4–1
16	Lehigh	7–3–1

== See also ==
- 1902 College Football All-America Team
