= Wesley Coe =

American shot putter

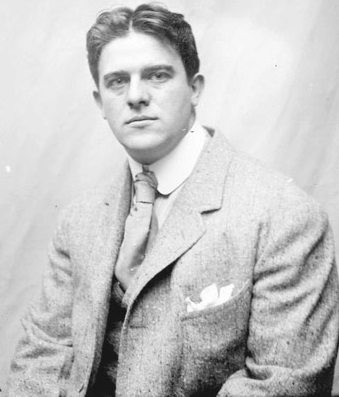
- Coe at the Chicago Daily News building, 1904

Personal information
- Full name: Wesley William Coe Jr.
- Born: May 8, 1879 Boston, Massachusetts, U.S.
- Died: December 24, 1926 (aged 47) Bozeman, Montana, U.S.
- Height: 5 ft 10 in (178 cm)
- Weight: 209 lb (95 kg)

Sport
- Sport: Track and field athletics
- Event: Shot put
- Club: Yale Bulldogs, New Haven; London Athletic Club; University of Oxford AC; Achilles Club
Medal record
Men's athletics
Representing the United States
Olympic Games
Silver medal – second place	1904 St. Louis	Shot put

Wesley William Coe Jr. (May 8, 1879 – December 24, 1926), sometimes listed as William Wesley Coe Jr., was an American track and field athlete who competed principally in the shot put and also in the hammer throw, discus throw, and tug of war.

A native of Boston, Massachusetts, Coe competed for the University of Oxford and became the shot put champion of England in 1901 and 1902. He was also the first American athlete to be awarded a "blue." He returned to the United States in 1902 and won the silver medal in the shot put at the 1904 Summer Olympics held in St. Louis, Missouri.

Between 1905 and 1907, Coe set world records in the 8-, 12-, and 16-pound shot put events. As a member of the Michigan Wolverines men's track and field team, he won the 1906 national intercollegiate championship in the shot put and placed second in the discus.

At the 1908 Summer Olympics in London, England, he finished fourth in the shot put. In 1920, at age 41, he won the 56-pound weight event at the British Championships.

== Early years ==
Coe was born in Boston, Massachusetts in 1879 and raised in Somerville, Massachusetts. He was the son of William W. Coe Sr. and Annie Coe. He began his education in the Boston public schools and subsequently attended preparatory schools, including Noble and Greenough School in Boston. In 1897, while attending Noble and Greenough, Coe was already competing in the shot put and recorded a distance of 35 feet, 7 inches. In 1898, while attending the Frye School, he won the interscholastic championship with a distance of 41 feet, 9 inches.

He enrolled at the Princeton Preparatory School in the fall of 1899 and won the Amateur Athletic Union (A.A.U.) junior championship in 1900.

== Athletic career ==
=== Oxford and Yale ===
In 1901, Coe enrolled at Hertford College at the University of Oxford. He won the British shot put AAA Championships title at the 1901 AAA Championships and 1902 AAA Championships. He was also the first American athlete to be awarded a "blue" after he led Oxford to victory over Cambridge University with wins in both the shot put and hammer throw. In 1901, he recorded a distance of 44 feet, 3 inches, and in 1902 increased his personal best to 44 feet, 10 inches.

Coe returned to the United States in 1902. Although he had been expected to enroll at Harvard University in his home town of Boston, Coe instead chose Yale University. He was reportedly enticed to enroll at Yale by "the blandishments of Mike Murphy and Walter Camp." He was expected to play football at Yale, but was not eligible to play during the 1902 season. Coe ultimately spent only one term at Yale.

=== 1904 Olympics ===
Coe at the 1904 Summer Olympics in St. Louis.

On July 4, 1904, at a meet held in Coe's home town of Sommerville, Massachusetts, Coe broke the world record with a distance of 48 feet, 6 inches, in the 16-pound shot put. However, the record was not recognized by the Amateur Athletic Union.

Two months after the meet in Sommerville, Coe competed for the United States in the 1904 Summer Olympics held in St Louis, Missouri. The 1904 Olympics began a period of intense and widely covered competition between Coe and Ralph Rose for supremacy in the shot put event. Rose was considered a giant of man, and at six feet, five-and-a-half inches, he was more than seven inches taller than Coe. At the 1904 Olympics, Rose set a new Olympic record on his first try with 14.35 metres only to be bettered by Coe who threw 14.40 metres on his first attempt. Rose ultimately won the gold medal with a new Olympic record and tied his own unofficial world record with 14.81 metres on his fifth throw. Coe finished in second place for the silver medal, and a third American Lawrence Feuerbach took the bronze medal.

=== World record at Medford ===
Following the 1904 Olympics, Rose bested Coe again at an event hosted by the Boston Athletic Association. Coe reportedly became determined to break Rose's world record and "labored faithfully to perfect his style." In February 1905, a large crowd was drawn to watch Coe at the indoor games of the Lawrence Light Guard Athletic Association held in the armory at Medford, Massachusetts. Rose attended the event as a guest and wished Coe luck before his first toss. Coe fell short of the record on his first four throws. As Coe prepared for his final throw, Rose said, "Come on now, old boy, you are in grand form this evening, and with just a little more power on your next put, you ought to place my mark well in the shade." The Boston Globe described the final throw as follows:

Coe smiled at the encouraging remark of his famous rival, and then made steady for his final put. The padded shot was carefully poised in his right hand, a firm grip was secured and then, with a lightning-like hop and spring, he drove the ball down the half. He secured splendid altitude, and when it dropped beyond his previous mark, Rose exclaimed, 'You've got it, Coe, and I congratulate you.'

Coe's final throw was initially measured at 49 feet, 2-1/2 inches, and later revised to 49 feet, 1-7/8 inches. The distance exceeded Rose's world record of 48.6 feet.

Coe had previously been denied the record "because of the lack of competent officials," but his record put at Medford was measured and re-measured to ensure that the record would stand. The shot was promptly weighed in the presence of Rose, several officials of the New England A.A.U., and newspaper reporters. The shot weighed exactly 16 pounds, and the Boston Globe reported that there appeared to be "no longer any doubt of the legality of the new record." However, the executive committee of the New England A.A.U. subsequently disallowed the record on the ground that "the shot was not a solid leaden ball" and that "the takeoff was not regulation."

Shortly after the Medford meet in 1905, Walter Christie, trainer of the University of California athletes and formerly trainer at Princeton, called Coe an "athletic vagrant." The Oakland Tribune reported:

Christie asserts that, out of his own knowledge, the young shot-putter has already been connected with five preparatory schools and four universities, including Oxford, Princeton, Harvard and Yale. Christie says that young Coe is an 'athletic vagrant,' attending one university as long as he can and while his credit holds out, and then jumping to the next college where the 'inducements' suit him.

=== University of Michigan ===
In March 1905, it was announced that Coe would attend the University of Michigan in the fall. Coe's rival, Ralph Rose, had attended the University of Michigan but had been recently been deemed ineligible by the school's athletic authority. Coe did enroll at the University of Michigan in the fall of 1905.

In September 1905, The Boston Globe reported that Coe was considering an expansion of his athletic endeavors to include boxing. The paper noted: "He is well built, of good height, and his performances on the athletic field show that he is very strong. For a big fellow, he is fast on his feet, and can hit hard with either hand."

In December 1905, Coe traveled to Portland, Oregon, to face Ralph Rose. Coe broke the world record in the 16-pound shot put event with a throw of 49 feet, 6 inches. Coe's throw exceeded the existing world record of 48 feet, 7 inches, by almost a foot. The Detroit Free Press wrote: "In a review of the athletic performances of the year, first place on the list of Yankee record-smashers must be conceded to Wesley W. Coe, at present a student at the University of Michigan, who journeyed all the way from his home in Somerville, Mass., to Portland, Ore., in order to get a chance to compete against Ralph Rose, who at that time held the world's record."

In March 1906, a challenge was made to Coe's eligibility to compete under Western Conference (now known as the Big Ten Conference) rules. Under a conference rule, athletes who had attended another college were required to sit out a year before competing in conference-sanctioned athletics.

While the conference considered the eligibility challenge, Coe was permitted to compete for Michigan in the national championship meet in April 1906. Coe won the national collegiate championship in the shot put and finished second in the discus competition. Coe's efforts helped the Michigan Wolverines men's track and field team to win its fourth consecutive national team championship.

In May 1906, the Western Conference announced that Coe would not be eligible to compete in conference events. The issue was decided by majority vote of the universities having membership in the conference.

=== Boston Athletic Association ===
In December 1906, the Boston Athletic Association (B.A.A.) announced that it had gathered a team of champion athletes to compete under its banner. The team included Coe as well as Ellery Clark, Olympic champion in the high jump and broad jump, and Robert Leavitt, Olympic hurdling champion.

In February 1907, while competing for the B.A.A., Coe set a new world record in the 8-pound shot put with a distance of 63 feet, 1-7/8 inches, at armory in Medford, Massachusetts, during the annual indoor meet of the Lawrence Light Guard Athletic Association. Coe's throw hit the crossbeam on the ceiling of the armory 20 feet above the ground and still exceeded the existing world record by nearly five inches.

In March 1907, Coe topped his own world record in the eight-pound shot put event and also broke the world record in the twelve-pound shot put. The records were set at the St. Louis University annual indoor meet. The new records set by Coe were 53 feet, 6-1/2 inches in the twelve-pound shot put and 62 feet, 8-1/4 inches in the eight-pound shot put.

=== 1908 Summer Olympics ===
In June 1908, Coe was selected to compete for the United States at the 1908 Summer Olympics in London. The shot put event was held in London on July 15, 1908. The event was divided into four sections, and athletes from the University of Michigan won three of the four sections. They were Coe, Ralph Rose, and John Garrels. In the finals, Coe finished in fourth place, behind Rose, Denis Horgan, and Garrels. Coe also competed in the tug of war for the United States team in London.

== Later years ==
After the 1908 Olympics, Coe worked for a time with his father in the mining business in California. Coe later moved to Detroit, Michigan, where he was employed as a research chemist.

In approximately 1916, Coe was married to Evelyn Coe, a native of Cheshire, England. They had two children. In his 1909 and 1917 U.S. Passport Applications, Coe indicated that his permanent residence was in Sommerville. In 1918, Coe was living in Lexington, Massachusetts, with his wife, and he was a partner with his father in the dye manufacturing business.

At the time of the 1920 United States census, Coe was living on Beacon Street in Boston with his wife, Evelyn, and their daughter, Jane. He listed his occupation as chemist. In a 1920 U.S. Passport application, he indicated he was employed as a chemist in the dye business and wished to travel to England for purposes of "protection of my patents". Letters submitted in support of the application indicated that Coe was in business with his father and had successes in "inventing dyes and by-products from waste materials" and was required to travel to England to protect pending patent rights.

Coe also continued to compete in occasional shot put competitions into his 30s. He placed second in the shot put at the 1912 AAA championships and won the 56-pound weight event at the 1920 British AAA Championships.

In June 1926, Coe became ill and moved to Bozeman, Montana, upon advice from his physician. He worked in the chemistry profession at Bozeman and died there from Hodgkin's disease at Deaconess Hospital on December 24, 1926, at age 47. He was survived by his wife and two children, who were then living at Bournemouth, England.
