= Harry Holt =

Harry Holt is the name or nickname of:

- Harry Holt (footballer) (1889–1956), Welsh association football player
- Harry Holt (1904–1964), American who with his wife Bertha co-founded Holt International Children's Services, a child welfare NGO
- Harry Holt (gridiron football) (born 1957), American who played in both the National and Canadian Football Leagues
- Harry Holt (Tarzan), a character in four Tarzan films
- Harold Holt (1908–1967), nicknamed "Harry", Australian Prime Minister

== See also ==
- Harold Holt (disambiguation)
- Henry Holt (disambiguation)
