= Lawrence Feuerbach =

American shot putter

Lawrence Feuerback
- Feuerbach in 1904 wearing the winged foot jersey of the New York Athletic Club

Personal information
- Nickname: Leon
- Born: Laurence Edward Joseph Feuerback; July 11, 1879 New York, New York, U.S.
- Died: November 16, 1911 (aged 32) Saranac Lake, New York, U.S.
- Education: New York University circa 1913

Sport
- Sport: Athletics
- Event: Shot put
- College team: New York University
- Club: New York Athletic Club
- Coached by: Mike Murphy (New York Ath. Club)

Achievements and titles
- Personal best: Shot Put – 14.48m (1906)
Medal record
Men's athletics
Representing the United States
Olympic Games
Bronze medal – third place	1904 St Louis	Shot put

Lawrence Edward Joseph "Leon" Feuerbach (July 11, 1879 – November 16, 1911) was an American track and field athlete who attended New York University, competed mainly in the shot put, and won a bronze medal in the Shot put at the 1904 St. Louis Olympics.

Lawrence Feuerback was born July 11, 1879 in Manhattan, New York. He competed for the New York Athletic Club where his training methodology may have been influenced by Mike Murphy, who coached at the New York Athletic Club full time through 1900, but continued with the club as an occasional coach, and spent spent 11 consecutive summers through around 1902 coaching many of the club's top athletes at the New York Athletic Club's summer facilities on Travers Island.

In 1903, he captured first place shot put throws in both the senior and junior Amateur Athletic Union (AAU) championships.

=== New York University ===
He attended and likely competed for New York University. In 1903, he was announced as a member of the Zeta Sigma Society at NYU, then known as the College of the City of New York.

== 1904 St. Louis Olympics ==
He participated in the 1904 Summer Olympics held on August 31 in St Louis, Missouri, where he competed in the shot put and won the bronze medal behind fellow Americans Ralph Rose and Wesley Coe. The Americans accounted for all seven of the shot put competitors in the finals. Feuerback's throw was recorded at 43 feet and 10 1/2 inches in Imperial measurements. Ralph Rose, who threw the shot put a world record distance of 48 feet and 7 inches was the favorite, having held the world's record in the event at the time. At the 1904 Olympics, Feuerbach may have been coached, but was certainly managed by 1904 Olympic General Manager for the U.S. track and field team Martin Delaney of the Chicago Athletic Association by 1909.

On August 29, Feuerbach placed second in the shotput handicap for men, with a throw of 42 feet, 8.5 inches in imperial measurements, or 13.02 meters. As with his other shotput competition, all of the competitors in the finals were Americans, and America was the only country that competed. The 1904 Olympics were unique in that America accounted for the great majority of the competitors. As noted in the shotput competition, only a few countries other than the U.S. attended the Games, and only a few athletes from foreign countries competed. There were few national teams sponsored by their home countries, so few competitors, particularly from distant foreign countries could afford the travel expense.

Feuerbach also competed in the late August Tug-Of-War for men competition at the St. Louis Olympics where the New York Athletic Club placed fourth, with Milwaukee Athletic Club winning the gold, and the St. Louis Southwest Turnverein Clubs 1 and 2 taking the silver and bronze medals respectively.

In 1906, Feuerbach had a personal best shot put throw of 14.48 meters.

Feuerbach died at the age of only 32 at Saranac Lake, New York on November 16, 1911. He was survived by a sister Louise L. Albert, to whom he willed property. The Saranac Lake area had facilities used for the treatment of tuberculosis, though Feuerbach's cause of death was not widely documented.
