= Andrew Marshall (American football guard) =

American college football player, lawyer (1879–1965)

Profile
- Position: Guard

Personal information
- Born: May 22, 1879; Boston, Massacusetts, U.S.
- Died: February 2, 1965 (aged 85); Ormond Beach, Florida, U.S.

Career information
- College: Dartmouth (1901); Harvard (1902–1903)

Awards and highlights
- Consensus All-American (1903); Third-team All-American (1902)

Andrew Marshall (May 22, 1879 – February 2, 1965) was an American American college football player. Marshall was educated at the Roxbury Latin School, Dartmouth College and Harvard Law School. He played one year of college football at Dartmouth and graduated in 1901. While attending Harvard Law School, he played for the Harvard Crimson football in 1902 and 1903 and was selected as a consensus All-American at the guard position in 1903. Marshall practiced law in Boston. He served as the Assistant Attorney General of Massachusetts. He was later a partner in the Hutchins and Wheeler law firm. He lived in the Jamaica Plain section of Boston. He died in February 1965 in Ormond Beach, Florida, at age 85.
