= Randolph Cohen =

American economist

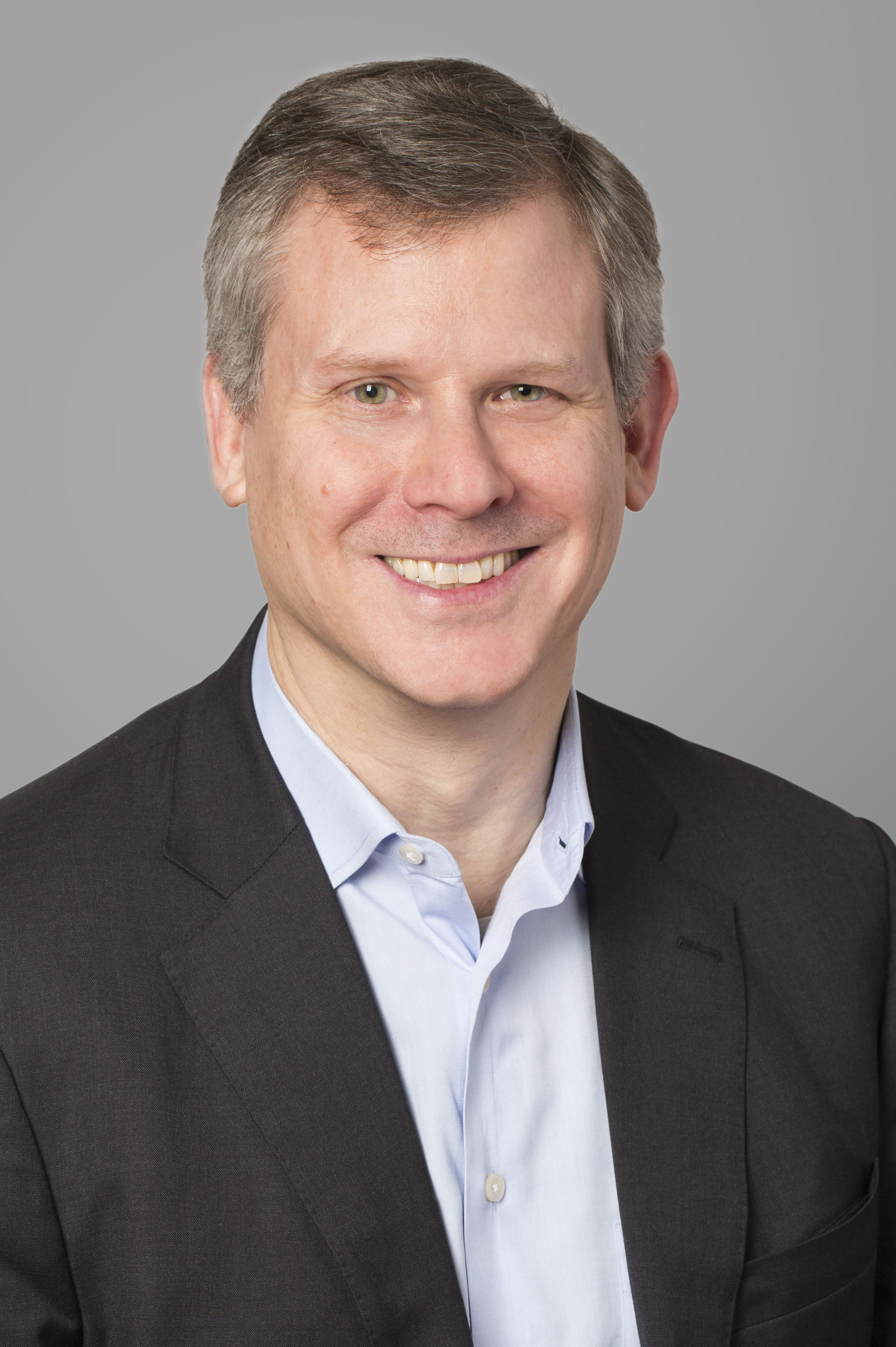
- Born: Philadelphia, Pennsylvania, U.S.
- Education: University of Chicago (Ph.D.); Harvard College (A.B.)
- Partner(s): ExSight Capital; Alignvest Investment Management
- Website: www.hbs.edu/faculty

Randolph Baer Cohen is an American financial economist and MBA Class of 1975 Senior Lecturer of Entrepreneurial Management at Harvard Business School.

== Career ==
At Harvard, Cohen teaches Field X and Field Y, entrepreneurship classes designed to enable students to develop and grow their businesses.

Cohen has helped to start and grow a number of investment management firms, and has served as a consultant to others. He is a partner at Exsight Capital Management LLC, a venture capital firm specializing in early-stage impact investments in innovative ophthalmic diagnostic and treatment solutions.

Cohen spoke at Hedge Fund Management (2007) hosted by Stanford CFA Institute.

Cohen is on the board of the Massachusetts Association for the Blind and Visually Impaired(MABVI), with which he collaborates to produce the podcast Dangerous Vision. On the podcast, Cohen invites people who have low vision or related to people with low vision to share how they navigate through their lives. Cohen also created a Dangerous Vision website to share his experience with vision loss more widely.

== Personal ==
Cohen was born in and grew up in Philadelphia and attended Germantown Academy in Fort Washington, Pennsylvania. His father was a practicing attorney and his mother taught reading at Wordsworth Academy, a school for children with learning disabilities. During graduate school he appeared on the television show Jeopardy! on an episode that aired January 29, 1997.

Cohen writes about professional basketball for the SB Nation Philadelphia 76ers fan site LibertyBallers under the name blindloyalty76. One of his most widely read pieces is "Robert Covington: top 30 NBA Player?".

== Research ==
Cohen has been published in several journals in the fields of finance and economics. In addition, Cohen has published numerous Harvard case studies on topics ranging from the valuation of baseball star Alex Rodriguez to risk arbitrage. His 2003 research entitled "The value spread" (with Christopher Polk and Tuomo Vuolteenaho) was a nominee for the Smith-Breeden Prize Prize for the best paper published in The Journal of Finance. His 2005 research entitled "Judging fund managers by the company they keep" (with Lubos Pastor and Joshua Coval), which was profiled in Time magazine (June 9, 2003), The New York Times (January 5, 2003), and Barron's Magazine (December 16–20, 2002), was also nominated for the Smith-Breeden Prize.

== Papers ==
Cohen is the co-author of the following most cited papers, ranked from most to least cited.

- Cohen, Randolph B.; Gompers, Paul A.; Vuolteenaho, Tuomo (November 2002). "Who underreacts to cash-flow news? evidence from trading between individuals and institutions" (PDF). Journal of Financial Economics. 66 (2–3): 409–462. doi:10.1016/S0304-405X(02)00229-5.
- Cohen, Randolph; Polk, Christopher; Vouolteenaho, Tuomo (2003). "TheValueSpread" (PDF). Journal of Finance. LVIII.
- COHEN, RANDOLPH B.; COVAL, JOSHUA D.; PÁSTOR, ĽUBOŠ (June 2005). "Judging Fund Managers by the Company They Keep" (PDF). The Journal of Finance. 60 (3): 1057–1096. doi:10.1111/j.1540-6261.2005.00756.x.
- Cohen, Randolph B.; Polk, Christopher; Vuolteenaho, Tuomo (May 2005). "Money Illusion in the Stock Market: The Modigliani-Cohn Hypothesis*" (PDF). Quarterly Journal of Economics. 120 (2): 639–668. doi:10.1162/0033553053970133.
