= Napoleon Riley =

American football player and US Army officer (1881–1941)

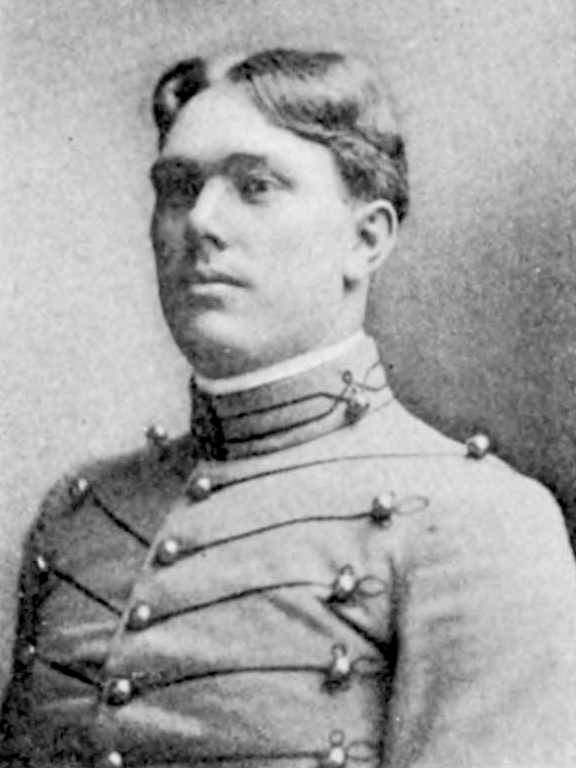
- At West Point in 1904

Profile
- Position: Guard

Personal information
- Born: February 22, 1881; Elkton, Kentucky, U.S.
- Died: October 31, 1941 (aged 60); Fort Sam Houston, Texas, U.S.

Career information
- College: Army (1903)

Awards and highlights
- Second-team All-American (1903)

Napoleon William Riley (February 22, 1881 – October 31, 1941) was an American football player and an officer in the United States Army.

== Biography ==
A native of Kentucky, Riley attended the United States Military Academy where he played at the guard position for the Army Black Knights football team from 1901 to 1903. He was selected by Walter Camp as a second-team member of his 1903 College Football All-America Team.

After graduating from the Military Academy, Riley served in the United States Army until February 1941. During World War I, he served as the Division Quartermaster for the 88th Division, and with the 352 Infantry in charge of Division School of Army. In 1920, Riley transferred to the Quartermaster Corps, attaining the rank of colonel and serving at Camp Dodge, Camp Lewis, the Office of the Quartermaster General, Watertown Arsenal, Chicago, the Philippine Islands, Tientsin, China, and the Panama Canal Zone. He developed an illness while serving in the Canal Zone and died from the illness in 1941 at Station Hospital in Fort Sam Houston, Texas, at age 60. He was buried at the Fort Sam Houston National Cemetery.
