= Ralph Tipton Davis =

American football player (c. 1880–1934)

Ralph Davis
Profile
- Position: End

Personal information
- Born: c. 1880; Pennsylvania, U.S.
- Died: May 23, 1934 (aged 53–54); Indianapolis, Indiana, U.S.

Career information
- College: Princeton

Awards and highlights
- National champion (1903); Consensus All-American (1901); 2× Second-team All-American (1902, 1903)

Ralph Tipton Davis (c. 1880 – May 23, 1934) was an American football player. He played college football at Princeton University and was a consensus All-American in 1901. He also played for Princeton's baseball and track teams. In 1902, he won the intercollegiate championship in the hammer throw and set a collegiate record with a throw of 164 feet, 10 inches.

== Early life ==
Davis was born in approximately 1880. Davis grew up in Blossburg, Pennsylvania and attended preparatory school at Andover. He was the captain of the football team at Andover.

== Princeton ==
Davis attended Princeton University and played for the Princeton Tigers football team from 1900 to 1902. While attending Princeton, Davis was five feet, seven inches tall and weighed 168 pounds. He played at the tackle position as a freshman and became an end as a sophomore. Davis was selected as a consensus All-American at the end position in 1901. He was also the captain of Princeton's 1902 football team. However, in the summer of 1902, it was announced that Davis may be academically ineligible, having failed to pass his examinations and would be required to repeat his sophomore year at Princeton. Davis was able to preserve his eligibility and served as the captain of Princeton's 1902 football team. In December 1902, a banquet honoring Davis was held at the Tiger Inn. Princeton's president Woodrow Wilson (later President of the United States) made the principal address, expressing admiration for Davis's conduct on the field as well as his "attitude both toward the team and the Faculty."

Davis had earlier faced controversy over his eligibility to play for Princeton's baseball team when it was revealed that he had played for a professional team in Atlantic City, New Jersey. His eligibility was preserved as Davis had not been paid for his participation on the Atlantic City club. Davis did play for Princeton's baseball team. He also was a member of Princeton's track team. In May 1902, he broke the intercollegiate record and won the intercollegiate hammer throw championship in 1902 with a throw of 164 feet, 10 inches. He also finished in third place in the shot put at the 1902 intercollegiate championship. Upon graduation in 1904, Davis was voted the "best all-around athlete" by his classmates.

== Later life ==
Davis later worked and lived in Indianapolis, Indiana. In 1919, he was employed as district manager of the United States Tire Company.

Davis died in 1934 at his home in Indianapolis. In 1939, Davis's former classmates created a scholarship fund in his name to be awarded to allow a student from Phillips Academy to attend Princeton.
