= Edgar Glass =

American football player (1879–1944)

Edgar T. Glass
Yale Bulldogs
- Position: Tackle

Personal information
- Born: May 24, 1879; Syracuse, New York, U.S.
- Died: April 9, 1944 (aged 64); Hartford, Connecticut, U.S.

Career information
- College: Syracuse (1900–1901); Yale (1902)

Awards and highlights
- Consensus All-American (1902)

Edgar Toll Glass (May 24, 1879 – April 9, 1944) was an American football player. He played college football at Syracuse University and Yale University. He was selected as a consensus All-American at the guard position in 1902. Glass played two years of college football at Syracuse before coming to Yale and, after a challenge to his eligibility by Harvard, was declared ineligible to compete in the 1903 football season under the four-year eligibility rule. He was also a shot putter who participated in the combined Harvard-Yale track team that traveled to England in 1904 to compete against athletes from Oxford and Cambridge. Glass was born in Syracuse, New York, and lived in West Hartford, Connecticut, in his later years. He was a sales manager for Steel and Tubes, Inc.
