= Lynn Classical High School =

Coordinates: 42°27′59.49″N 70°59′00.30″W

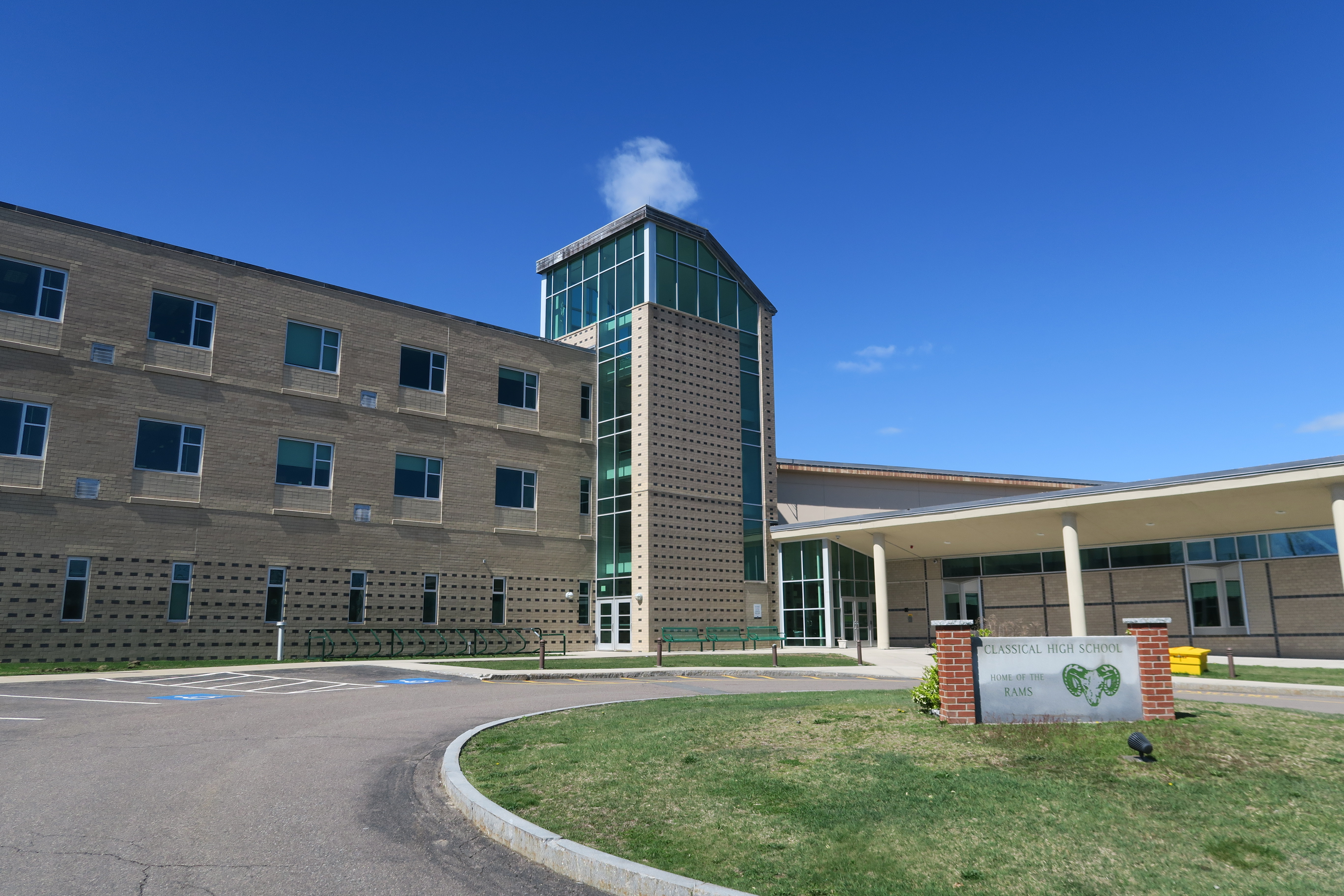
- Lynn Classical High School

Location
- 235 O'Callaghan Way; Lynn, Massachusetts 01905; United States

Information
- School type: Public
- School district: Lynn Public Schools
- Principal: Amy Dunn
- Staff: 124.87 (FTE)
- Grades: 9-12
- Enrollment: 1,795 (2024-2025)
- Student to teacher ratio: 14.37
- Colors: Green and gold
- Athletics conference: Greater Boston League (GBL)
- Mascot: Classical Rams
- Website: www.lynnschools.org/lynn-classical-high-school-home

Lynn Classical High School is a high school in the city of Lynn, Massachusetts, United States. It is a part of Lynn Public Schools.

The school was once located off the Lynn Commons, in a building which is now the Fecteau-Leary school. The high school was moved to O'Callaghan Way after the controversial construction of a new facility. The new facility, built on landfill, required significant repair after the building's foundation began to sink due a lack of steel pilings.

== Notable alumni ==
- Harry Agganis, Major League Baseball first baseman
- Julie Archoska, National Football League player
- Harry A. Dame, quarterback, high school football coach
- Edward Farnsworth, All-American college football player
- Ken Hill, Major League Baseball pitcher
- Glenn Ordway, sports commentator
- Lou Tsioropoulos, professional basketball player
- Helen F. Tucker, biochemist
- Gasper Urban, football player
