= John DeWitt (athlete) =

American athlete (1881–1930)

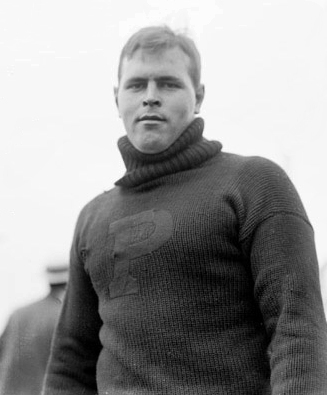

Princeton Tigers
- Position: Guard
- Class: 1904

Personal information
- Born: October 29, 1881; Phillipsburg, New Jersey, U.S.
- Died: July 28, 1930 (aged 48); New York, New York, U.S.
- Listed height: 6 ft 1 in (1.85 m)
- Listed weight: 198 lb (90 kg)

Career information
- High school: Lawrenceville Prep
- College: Princeton (1901–1903)

Awards and highlights
- National champion (1903); 2× Consensus All-American (1902, 1903)
- College Football Hall of Fame (Class of 1954)

Other information
Medal record
Men's athletics
Representing the United States
Olympic Games
Silver medal – second place	1904 St Louis	Hammer throw

John Riegel DeWitt (October 29, 1881 – July 28, 1930) was an American athlete. He played college football for Princeton from 1901 to 1903 and was selected as an All-American in 1902 and 1903. He also competed in the hammer throw, setting the world record in 1903 and winning the silver medal at the 1904 Summer Olympics.

== Early life ==
DeWitt was born in October 1881 at Phillipsburg, New Jersey. His parents were wealthy owners of extensive mining properties. He moved at a young age to Riegelsville, Pennsylvania, and was raised there. He attended the Lawrenceville School in New Jersey.

== College football ==
=== 1901 and 1902 seasons ===
DeWitt enrolled at Princeton University in 1900. He sustained a hand injury as a freshman that prevented him from playing football that fall. As a sophomore and junior, he was a starter for the 1901 and 1902 Princeton Tigers football teams that compiled records of 9–1–1 and 8–1 -- the only losses coming to Yale. He played mostly at the guard position, some at tackle, and also earned a reputation as "the greatest drop and punt kicker in the gridiron." At the end of the 1902 season, DeWitt was selected by Walter Camp as a first-team guard on the 1902 All-America team.

=== 1903 season ===
In December 1902, DeWitt was elected by his teammates as captain of the 1903 Princeton Tigers football team. At the start of the 1903 season, The Buffalo Commercial wrote of DeWitt: "This man is rightly considered the greatest athlete in the colleges of America today. At kicking goals from the field he has probably never had an equal." He led the 1903 team to an 11–0 record, outscoring opponents 259 to 5. The 1903 team has been rated by multiple selectors (Billingsley Report, Helms Athletic Foundation, Houlgate System, and Parke H. Davis) as the national champion and as co-national champion by the National Championship Foundation.

Princeton's undefeated season hinged on the final game against rival Yale, a team Princeton had not beaten since 1899. DeWitt led the Tigers to victory, scoring all of Princeton's points in an 11–6 victory. He recovered a Yale fumble and returned it 73 yards for a touchdown in the first half. With one minute remaining and the game tied at 6–6, DeWitt kicked a game-winning goal (then worth five points) from placement from Yale's 43-yard line. The Boston Globe described DeWitt's game-winning kick:

In the long struggle which was now almost at an end, the Princeton captain had played a lion's part. He was wearing a bandage around his temple, and his right hand and wrist were wound with bandages. The black and orange jersey had been torn completely off, and the muscles of giant stood out in bold relief in the dull light of the late afternoon. A hush fell over the entire grand stand. Finally DeWitt having satisfied himself that his aim was good, swung back his right leg, and the ball shot straight as an arrow between Yale's goal post."

During DeWitt's three years on Princeton's football team, the Tigers compiled a record of 28-2-1 with the only losses coming against Yale.

In 2009, the National Football Foundation retroactively selected Heisman Trophy winners for the years between 1889 and 1935. Dewitt was selected as the winner for 1903 and a runner-up for 1902. Walter Camp placed him on an all-time All-America team. One writer calls him Princeton's greatest football player. He was inducted into the College Football Hall of Fame in 1954.

== Track and field ==
DeWitt was also a member of Princeton's track team. He set a record in 1903 with a throw of 168 feet and four inches. He represented the United States at the 1904 Summer Olympics held in St. Louis. In the hammer throw competition, DeWitt finished in second place, winning the silver medal. John Flanagan won the gold medal, though his winning throw fell short of DeWitt's record set the prior year.

== Later life ==
After graduating from Princeton, DeWitt was employed by the National Bag Corp. He married Elsie Casey in 1915. He also served as an assistant football coach at Princeton for a time. He died in July 1930 at age 49 after suffering a heart attack while traveling by train from his home in Fairfield, Connecticut, to New York City to attend an appointment with a cardiologist.
