= Julie Archoska =

American football player (1905–1972)

No. 9
- Position: End

Personal information
- Born: March 13, 1905; Lynn, Massachusetts, U.S.
- Died: March 18, 1972 (aged 67); Lynn, Massachusetts, U.S.
- Listed height: 5 ft 11 in (1.80 m)
- Listed weight: 190 lb (86 kg)

Career information
- High school: Lynn Classical
- College: Syracuse

Career history
- Ashland Armco Yellowjackets (1928); Staten Island Stapletons (1930)
- Stats at Pro Football Reference

Jules Archoska (March 13, 1905 – March 18, 1972) was an American football end. He played college football at Syracuse University, and professionally for the Staten Island Stapletons of the National Football League (NFL).

== Early life and college ==
Jules Archoska was born on March 13, 1905, in Lynn, Massachusetts. He attended Lynn Classical High School, where he participated in football, track, and crew. He was the football team captain and graduated from Lynn in 1923.

Archoska played college football for the Syracuse Orange of Syracuse University. He was on the freshman team in 1923 and was a three-year letterman from 1924 to 1926. He also participated in track and crew at Syracuse.

== Professional career ==
In 1928, Archoska played for the Ashland Armco Yellowjackets, based out of Ashland, Kentucky.

Archoska played in four games, starting one, for the Staten Island Stapletons of the National Football League in 1930 as an end. He wore jersey number 9 while with the Stapletons. He stood 5'11" and weighed 190 pounds.

== Personal life ==
Archoska ran the Night Hawkes, which was a football team that played night games at General Electric Field in Lynn. He was also an accountant for a Chicago lumber company. He retired as a lumber salesman. Archoska enjoyed traveling to national parks and monuments. On March 18, 1972, after a long illness, he died at his home at 82 Birch Street in Lynn.
