= Ledyard Mitchell =

Ledyard Miller

Profile
- Position: Fullback

Personal information
- Born: November 2, 1881; Cincinnati, Ohio, U.S.
- Died: May 18, 1964 (aged 82); Grosse Pointe Farms, Michigan, U.S.

Career information
- College: Yale (1903)

Awards and highlights
- Consensus All-American (1903)

William Ledyard Mitchell (November 2, 1881 – May 18, 1964) was an automobile executive, serving as president of Maxwell Motor Company, and a co-founder of Chrysler Corporation in 1925. He was also an All-American college football player for Yale in 1903.

== Early life ==
Mitchell was born in 1881 in Cincinnati. He attended Yale University, where he was played college football and was selected as a fullback on the 1903 All-America college football team. Members of the Yale Class of 1904 created the Ledyard Mitchell Cup which was awarded each year to a Yale player for proficiency in punting. He graduated from Yale in 1904. He returned to Cincinnati, working with a family business, the Robert Mitchell Furniture Company, eventually holding the position of general manager.

== Maxwell Motor Company ==
Mitchell became president of the Maxwell Motor Company in December 1917. With the new position, Mitchell relocated from Cincinnati to Detroit. When Maxwell went through reorganization proceedings in 1920, Mitchell served as the company's receiver and active executive. In 1921, an executive of Dodge Brothers became president of the reorganized company, and Mitchell became a vice president.

== Chrysler Corporation ==
In 1925, Mitchell was a cofounder of Chrysler Corporation which took over the assets of Maxwell. He was secretary and vice president in charge of manufacturing at Chrysler. In 1926, he became general manager of operations for Chrysler with responsibility for Chrysler's five manufacturing plants. He became general manager of Chrysler's operations. He became chairman of Chrysler's export division in 1929 and chairman of Chrysler of Canada in 1932. During World War II, he oversaw Chrysler's construction of destroyer exports for the Navy. He retired from Chrysler in 1947 at age 65.

== Family and later years ==
Mitchell was married in 1910 to Sara Moulton Sherman. The couple had five children, Sara Sherman Mitchell, William Ledyard Mitchell, Jr., Mary Sherman Mitchell, Frank Sherman Mitchell and Ann Sherman Mitchell. Mitchell died on May 18, 1964, at his home in Grosse Pointe Farms, Michigan.
