= Daniel Knowlton =

American football player (1881–1969)

Profile
- Position: Tackle

Personal information
- Born: April 7, 1881
- Died: March 5, 1969 (aged 87); Providence, Rhode Island, US

Career information
- College: Harvard (1903–1905)

Awards and highlights
- Consensus All-American (1903); Second-team All-American (1902)

Daniel Waldo Knowlton, Jr. (April 7, 1881 – March 5, 1969) was an American football player. He played college football for the Harvard Crimson football from 1903 to 1905 and was selected as a consensus All-American at the tackle position in 1903. After graduating from Harvard College, he attended Harvard Law School. From 1910 to 1917, he lived in Colorado Springs, Colorado, where he practiced law. During World War I, he served in United States Army's 148th Field Artillery Regiment. Following his wartime service, Knowlton accepted a job with the Interstate Commerce Commission (ICC). From 1928 to 1952, he was the chief legal counsel to the Interstate Commerce Commission in Washington, D.C. In his later years, he lived in Bristol, Rhode Island. He was married to Josephine Gibson. Knowlton died in 1969 at age 87.
