= Athletics at the 1904 Summer Olympics – Men's hammer throw =

Men's hammer throw at the Games of the III Olympiad
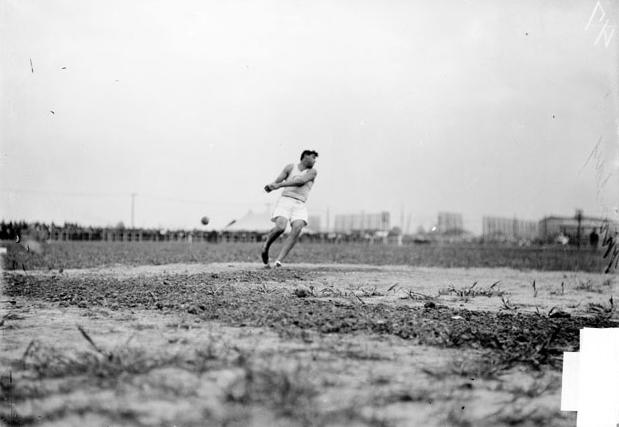
- Ralph Rose on the way to the bronze medal.
- Venue: Francis Field
- Dates: August 29
- Competitors: 6 from 1 nation
- Winning distance: 51.23 OR

Medalists
1st place, gold medalist(s)		John Flanagan; United States
2nd place, silver medalist(s)		John DeWitt; United States
3rd place, bronze medalist(s)		Ralph Rose; United States

The men's hammer throw was a track and field athletics event held as part of the Athletics at the 1904 Summer Olympics programme. It was the second time the event was held. The competition was held on Monday, August 29, 1904. Six athletes from the United States competed. John Flanagan, the reigning champion, defended his gold medal and set a new Olympic record. John DeWitt took silver and Ralph Rose bronze. It was the second consecutive medal sweep for the United States in the event. Flanagan was the first man to earn multiple medals in the event; he would finish with three consecutive victories, a record not matched by anyone in the hammer throw.

== Background ==
This was the second appearance of the event, which has been held at every Summer Olympics except 1896. John Flanagan was the defending Olympic champion and had won at least 10 national titles across Great Britain, Ireland, and the United States; he was a heavy favorite. John DeWitt was a four-time IC4A champion. Ralph Rose was best known as a shot putter, but had been rumored to have thrown a monstrous 190 feet (57.9 metres). The lack of international competition meant that Great Britain's two-time AAA champion Tom Nicolson was absent. Also not competing was American Alfred Plaw, who had beaten Flanagan to win the AAU championship in 1904.

== Competition format ==
The format of the competition is unclear. The throwing area was a seven-foot circle.

== Records ==
These were the standing world and Olympic records (in metres) prior to the 1904 Summer Olympics.

World record	John Flanagan (USA)	52.71^{*}	New York City, United States	31 July 1904
Olympic record	John Flanagan (USA)	51.01	Paris, France	16 July 1900

^{*} unofficial - The IAAF did not begin to recognize World Records in this event until 1912.

John Flanagan bettered the only Olympic record with 51.23 meters.

== Schedule ==
Date	Time	Round
Monday, 29 August 1904		Final

== Results ==
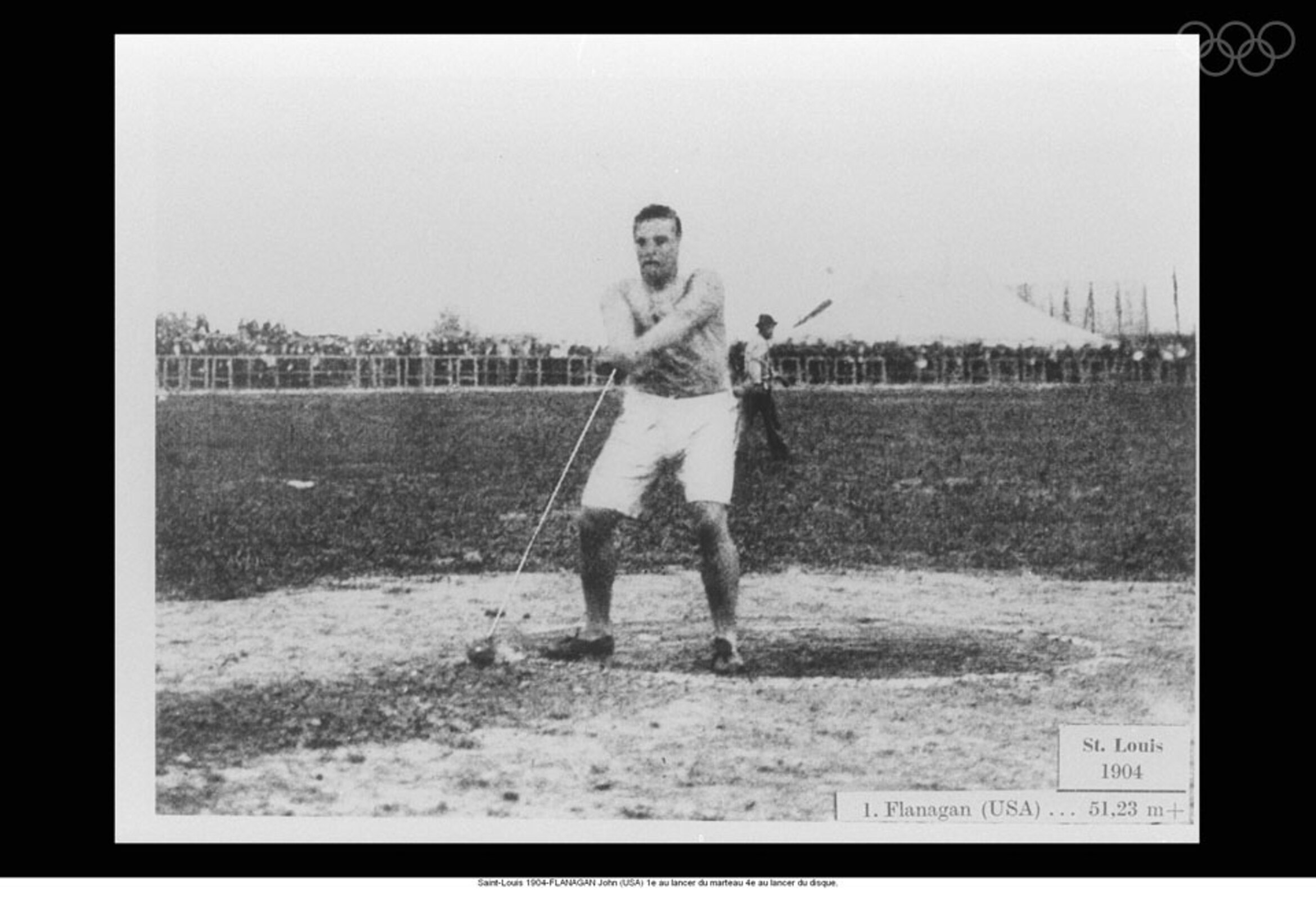
John Flanagan throwing the hammer

Rank	Athlete	Nation	Distance	Notes
1st place, gold medalist(s)	John Flanagan	United States	51.23	OR
2nd place, silver medalist(s)	John DeWitt	United States	50.26	
3rd place, bronze medalist(s)	Ralph Rose	United States	45.73	
4	Charles Chadwick	United States	42.78	
5	James Mitchel	United States	Unknown	
6	Albert Johnson	United States	Unknown	

== Sources ==
- Wudarski, Pawel (1999). "Wyniki Igrzysk Olimpijskich" (in Polish).
