= Charles D. Rafferty =

American football player and coach (1879–1949)

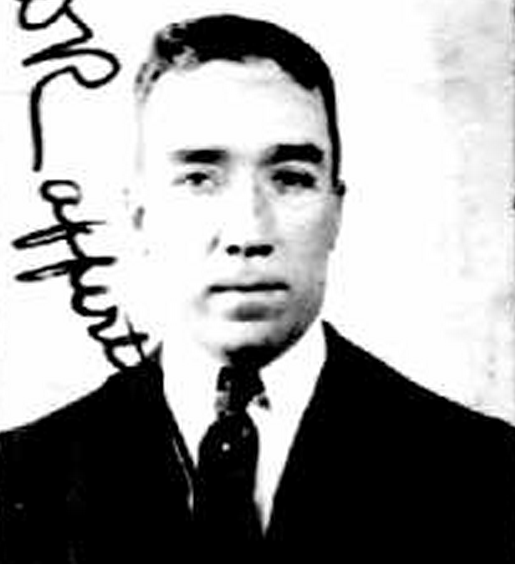
- Rafferty, 1921

Biographical details
- Born: August 17, 1879; Pittsburgh, Pennsylvania, U.S.
- Died: October 27, 1949 (aged 70); Greenwich, Connecticut, U.S.

Playing career
- 1900–1903: Yale
- Position: End

Coaching career (HC unless noted)
- 1904: Yale

Head coaching record
- Overall: 10–1

Accomplishments and honors

Awards
- Consensus All-American (1903)

Charles Donnelly Rafferty (August 17, 1879 – October 27, 1949) was an All-American football player and coach. He played at the end position for the Yale Bulldogs football team from 1900 to 1903, was captain of Yale's 1903 football team, and was selected as a first-team All-American in 1903. He also served as the head coach of the Yale football team in 1904, leading the team to a record of 10–1.

== Early years ==
Rafferty was born at Pittsburgh, Pennsylvania in August 1879. He was the son of Gilbert Thomas Rafferty and Harriett Martin Oliver. He attended preparatory school at Andover. He played two years at the end position for Andover's football team.

== Yale ==
He subsequently enrolled at Yale University's Sheffield Scientific School. While attending Yale, he played for the Yale Bulldogs football team from 1900 to 1903. The Yale football team during Rafferty's first season in 1900, included star quarterback Jim Wear of St. Louis, whose sister, Lucretia Wear, married George Herbert Walker, investment banker, and later father-in-law of Senator Prescott Bush. "Charley" Rafferty played at the end position for Yale as a substitute in 1900 and 1901 and as a starter in 1902 and 1903. However, he did not play the full season during his junior year due to a condition in his academic studies. In February 1903, he was elected by his teammates as the captain of Yale's 1903 football team. He was also selected in 1903 as a consensus first-team All-American at the end position by Walter Camp for Collier's Weekly, Caspar Whitney, for Outing magazine, Fielding H. Yost, and Charles Chadwick.

After graduating from Yale in 1904, Rafferty returned in the fall of 1904 as the head coach of Yale's football team with Walter Camp serving as the general advisory coach. He led the team to a record of 10–1–0 in his one season as head coach.

During the period from 1899 to 1912, Yale had 14 different head football coaches in 14 years – despite compiling a combined record of 127–11–10 in those years. During that 14-year span, the Yale football team has also been recognized as the national championship team by one or more of the major national championship selectors on seven occasions – 1900 (Billingsley, Helms, Houlgate, National Championship Foundation, Parke Davis), 1901 (Parke Davis), 1902 (Parke Davis), 1905 (Parke Davis, Whitney), 1906 (Billingsley, Parke Davis, Whitney), 1907 (Billingsley, Helms, Houlgate, National Championship Foundation, Parke Davis, Whitney), and 1909 (Billingsley, Helms, Houlgate, National Championship Foundation, Parke Davis).

== Later years ==
Rafferty was married in June 1912 to Regina Corinne Gelshenen. Rafferty and his wife lived in Greenwich, Connecticut, and Fishers Island, New York. In a draft registration card dated September 1918, Rafferty indicated that he was living with his wife Corrine on Glenville Road in Greenwich and working in the chemical and fertilizer business for H. J. Baker and Bro. in New York, New York.

At the time of the 1920 United States census, Rafferty was listed as a resident of Greenwich employed as a silk importer. He was living at that time with his wife Corrine and their three children, Brendan (age 6), Kevin (age 4), and Martha (age 1 year, 4 mos.).

A passport application filed by Rafferty in May 1921 indicated that he continued in the employ of H. J. Baker and Bro., importers and exporters of heavy chemicals and fertilizer materials. The application indicated that he intended to travel in France, the British Isles, Belgium, Spain and Gibraltar on business for his employer and on vacation for three months.

At the time of the 1930 United States census, Rafferty was listed as a resident of Greenwich employed as a salesman for an importing company. He was living at that time with his wife Corrine and their children Brendan (age 15), Kevin (age 13), Martha (age 10), and Walter (age 8). Charles and Corinne's son, Walter Gelshenen Rafferty, attended Yale and married Martha Ann Pierce in 1941. Martha's younger sister, Barbara Pierce, married another Yale man from Greenwich, George H. W. Bush, in January 1945.

In a draft registration card completed at the time of World War II, Rafferty indicated that he was not employed and was living in Greenwich with his wife, Mrs. C.D. Rafferty.

Rafferty died in October 1949 at Greenwich, Connecticut.

Rafferty's grandson, Kevin Rafferty, is a documentary film cinematographer, director, and producer, best known for his 1982 documentary The Atomic Cafe.

== Head coaching record ==
Year	Team	Overall	Conference	Standing	Bowl/playoffs
Yale Bulldogs (Independent) (1904)
1904	Yale	10–1			
Yale:		10–1			
Total:		10–1			
