= Helen F. Tucker =

American scientist

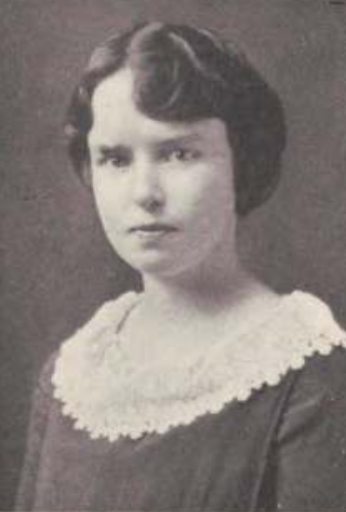
- Helen F. Tucker, from the 1923 yearbook of Mount Holyoke College
- Born: Helen Farnham Tucker; January 26, 1902; Swampscott, Massachusetts, U.S.
- Died: February 25, 1986 (aged 84); Sarasota, Florida, U.S.
- Occupations: Biochemist, technical editor

Helen Farnham Tucker (January 26, 1902 – February 25, 1986) was an American biochemist. She taught college chemistry courses and published research with James Flack Norris and Birgit Vennesland in the 1930s and 1940s. She was a technical editor for Rohm and Haas in the 1940s and 1950s, and worked at Miles Laboratories in the 1960s.

== Early life and education ==
Tucker was born in Swampscott, Massachusetts, the daughter of Charles William Tucker and Gertrude Cogswell Mason Tucker. Her father was a chemist in the leather industry. Two of her brothers also became chemists.

Tucker graduated from Lynn Classical High School in 1919, and Mount Holyoke College in 1923. She completed a master's degree at Vassar College in 1925, with a thesis titled "The Temperature Co-efficient of the Photochemical Reduction of Ferric Chloride in Anhydrous Ethyl Alcohol". She earned her PhD at the Massachusetts Institute of Technology in 1933, with a dissertation titled "The effect of substituents on the thermal stability of certain derivatives of malonic acid".

== Career ==
Tucker was an assistant in the chemistry department at Vassar while she was a graduate student there. She taught chemistry courses at Mount Holyoke and Russell Sage College. She was an officer in the Philadelphia chapter of the American Chemical Society, while she worked as editor of Developments Report in Chemistry, a publication of the Rohm and Haas, a chemical manufacturing company. She moved to Indiana to work at Miles Laboratories in 1961.

== Publications ==
- "The Reactivity of Atoms and Groups in Organic Compounds. XIV. The Influence of Substituents on the Thermal Stability of Certain Derivatives of Malonic Acid" (1933, with James Flack Norris)
- "The Effect of Supplementary Methionine and Cystine on the Production of Fatty Livers by Diet" (1937, with Henry C. Eckstein)
- "The Effect of Supplementary Lysine, Methionine, and Cystine on the Production of Fatty Livers by High Fat Diets Containing Gliadin" (1938, with Henry C. Eckstein)
- "The Effect of Supplementary Cystine and Methionine on the Production of Fatty Livers by Rats on High Fat Diets containing Casein or Edestin" (1940, with C. R. Treadwell and Henry C. Eckstein)
- "The Source of Pancreatic Juice Bicarbonate" (1941, with Eric G. Ball, A. K. Solomon, and Birgit Vennesland)
- "The Activity of Carbonic Anhydrase in Relation to the Secretion and Composition of Pancreatic Juice" (1941, with Eric G. Ball)

== Personal life ==
Tucker died in 1986, at the age of 84, in Sarasota, Florida.
