= Harold Holt (disambiguation) =

Harold Holt was Prime Minister of Australia from 1966 to 1967.

Harold Holt may also refer to:

- Harold Holt (impresario) (1885–1953), British classical music impresario

== Named after Prime Minister Harold Holt ==
- Division of Holt, an Australian Electoral Division in Victoria
- Harold Holt Memorial Swimming Centre in Glen Iris, Melbourne
- Holt, Australian Capital Territory, a suburb of Canberra
- Naval Communication Station Harold E. Holt, near Exmouth, Western Australia
- USS Harold E. Holt, a Knox-class frigate of the US Navy

== See also ==
- Harry Holt (disambiguation)
