= Albert Johnson (hammer thrower) =

American hammer thrower and shot putter

Albert Aaron Johnson (January 1, 1880 – May 31, 1963) was an American track and field athlete who competed in the 1904 Summer Olympics. In 1904 he finished sixth in the shot put event as well as sixth in the hammer throw competition.
