= Joseph McAndrew =

American football player and US Army officer (1879–1963)

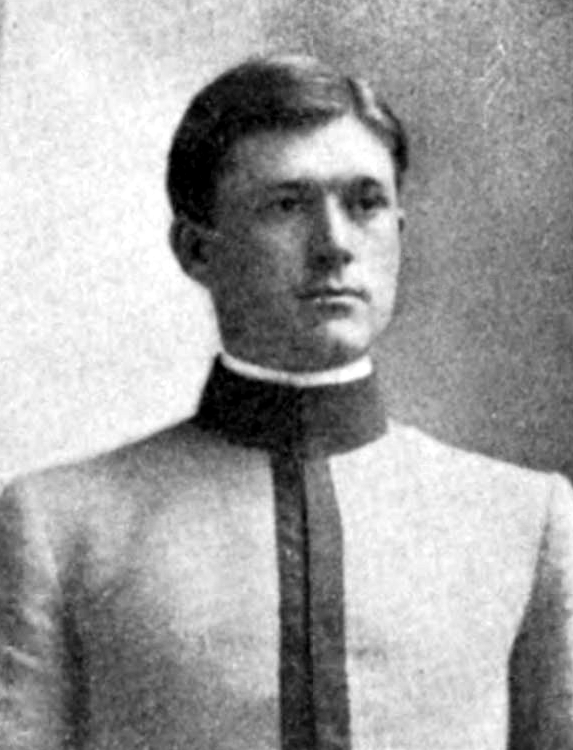
- At West Point in 1904

Profile
- Position: End

Personal information
- Born: October 2, 1879; Osage Mills, Arkansas, U.S.
- Died: August 13, 1963 (aged 83); Concord, North Carolina, U.S.

Career information
- College: Army (1902)

Awards and highlights
- All-American (1902)

Joseph Alexander McAndrew (October 2, 1879 – August 13, 1963) was an American football player and an officer in the United States Army.

== Biography ==
Joseph McAndrew was born in Osage Mills, Arkansas on October 2, 1879. He attended the United States Military Academy, where he played at the end position for the Army football team from 1901 to 1903. He was selected by The Post-Standard (Syracuse, New York) as a first-team end on the 1902 College Football All-America Team.

After graduating from the Military Academy, McAndrew served in the infantry, United States Army, attaining the rank of colonel. He received a Distinguished Service Medal for his service as the director of the infantry specialists school at Langres, France, during World War I. From 14 May 1937 to 15 March 1938, Col. McAndrew was the Commander, US Army Forces in China.

He died in Bentonville, Arkansas on August 10, 1963.
