= 1902 All-America college football team =

Official list of the best college football players of 1902

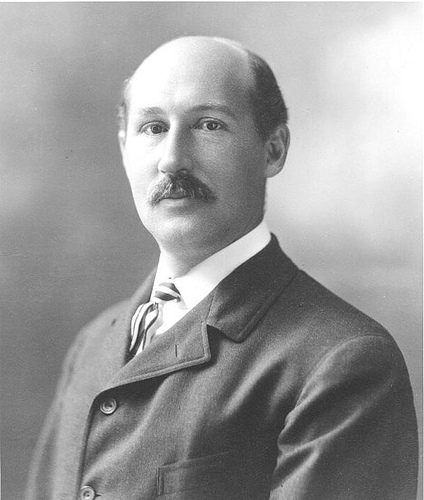
Walter Camp, one of two "official" All-America selectors in 1902

The 1902 All-America college football team is composed of college football players who were selected as All-Americans by various individuals who chose All-America college football teams for the 1902 college football season. The only two individuals who have been recognized as "official" selectors by the National Collegiate Athletic Association (NCAA) for the 1902 season are Walter Camp and Caspar Whitney, who had originated the All-America concept 14 years earlier in 1889. Camp's 1902 All-America team was published in Collier's Weekly, and Whitney's selections were published in Outing magazine.

== Consensus All-Americans ==
In its official listing of "Consensus All-America Selections," the NCAA identifies as "consensus All-Americans" those players who were selected by either Camp or Whitney. Using this criterion, the NCAA recognized 14 players as "consensus All-American" for the 1902 football season. They are indicated in bold in the list below ("All-Americans of 1901").

In 2008, Sports Illustrated sought to answer the question, "Who would have won the Heisman from 1900-1934?" Its selection for 1902 was Paul Bunker of Army, a player who converted from tackle to halfback and "dominated Navy from both sides of the ball, scoring twice in a 22-8 victory."

== Concerns of Eastern bias ==
The All-America selections by Camp and Whitney were dominated by players from the East and the Ivy League in particular. In 1902, all 14 consensus All-Americans came from Eastern universities, and 12 of 14 played in the Ivy League. The Yale Bulldogs (Camp's alma mater) had seven players who were designated as consensus All-Americans. The only two consensus All-Americans from schools outside the Ivy League were tackle Paul Bunker and center Robert Boyers, both of whom played for Army.

The dominance of Eastern players led to criticism over the years that the All-America selections were biased against players from the leading Western universities, including Chicago, Michigan, Minnesota, Wisconsin, and Notre Dame. During the 1902 season, Fielding H. Yost's "Point-a-Minute" team at Michigan compiled an 11–0 record and outscored its opponents by a combined score of 644 to 12. Seven Michigan players were chosen for All-Western teams, including Willie Heston, Joe Maddock, Boss Weeks, Everett Sweeley, Paul J. Jones, Curtis Redden, and Dan McGugin. Yet, not one player from a western school was recognized as a first-team All-American by Camp or Whitney.

== Unofficial selectors ==
In addition to Camp and Whitney, other sports writers and publications selected All-America teams in 1902, though such lists have not been recognized as "official" All-America selections by the NCAA. The list below includes the All-America selections made by The Newark Advocate and The Post-Standard of Syracuse, New York. Only one player, guard Edward Glass of Yale, was unanimously selected by Camp, Whitney, The Newark Advocate, and The Post-Standard.

== All-American selections for 1902 ==
=== Ends ===
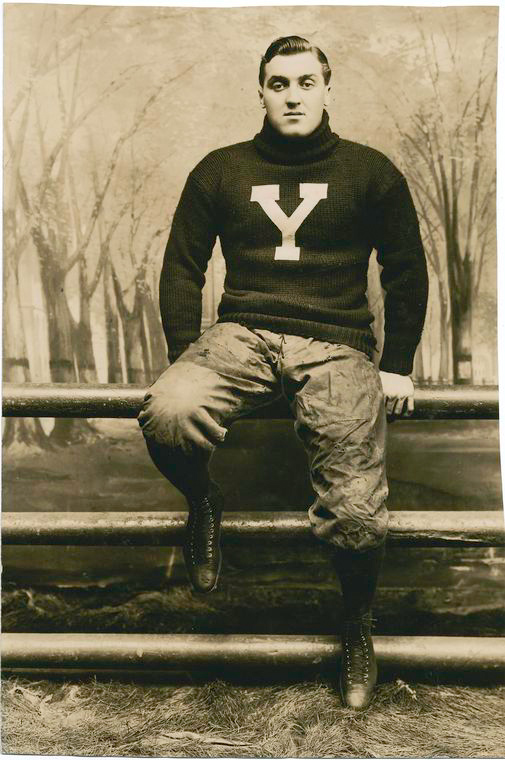
Tom Shevlin of Yale.

- **Thomas Shevlin**, Yale (WC-1; CW-1)
- **Edward Bowditch**, Harvard (WC-1; CW-1; NA-1)
- Ralph Tipton Davis, Princeton (WC-2; CW-2; NA-1; PS-1)
- Joseph McAndrew, Army (PS-1)
- Everett Sweeley, Michigan (WC-2)
- D. R. Brown, Lafayette (CW-2)
- Sol Metzger, Penn (WC-3)
- Allen Farmer, Dartmouth (WC-3)

=== Tackles ===
- **Ralph Kinney**, Yale (WC-1; CW-1)
- **James Hogan**, Yale (WC-1; NA-1; PS-1)
- **Paul Bunker**, Army (WC-1; CW-1; PS-1)
- Joseph Maddock, Michigan (NA-1)
- Hervey Cushman Pierce, Amherst (WC-2)
- Daniel Knowlton, Harvard (WC-2)
- Edward Farnsworth, Army (CW-2)
- Robert Torrey, Penn (CW-2)
- Ernest Farr, Chicago (WC-3)
- Fred Schacht, Minnesota (WC-3)

=== Guards ===
- **Edgar Glass**, Yale (WC-1; CW-1; NA-1; PS-1)
- **John DeWitt**, Princeton (WC-1; CW-2; NA-1; PS-1)
- **Bill Warner**, Cornell (WC-2; CW-1)
- Charles Belknap Jr., Navy (CW-2)
- George Goss, Yale (WC-2)
- Arnie Lerum, Wisconsin (WC-3)
- Andrew Marshall, Harvard (WC-3)

=== Centers ===
- **Henry Holt**, Yale (WC-1; CW-2; NA-1; PS-1)
- **Robert Boyers**, Army (WC-2; CW-1)
- James F. McCabe, Penn (WC-3)

=== Quarterbacks ===
- **Foster Rockwell**, Yale (WC-1; CW-1; PS-1)
- Boss Weeks, Michigan (WC-2; CW-2; NA-1)
- Charles Dudley Daly, Army (WC-3)

=== Halfbacks ===
- **George B. Chadwick**, Yale (WC-1; CW-1; NA-1)
- **Thomas A. Barry**, Brown (WC-2; CW-1)
- Willie Heston, Michigan (WC-3; NA-1)
- Harold Weekes, Columbia (CW-2; PS-1)
- Harold Metcalf, Yale (WC-2; CW-2; PS-1)
- Walter L. Foulke, Princeton (WC-3)

=== Fullbacks ===
- **Thomas Graydon**, Harvard (WC-1; CW-1; NA-1)
- Morgan H. Bowman, Yale (WC-2; CW-2; PS-1)
- Torne, Army (WC-3)

=== Key ===
- WC = Walter Camp published in Collier's Weekly
- CW = Caspar Whitney published in Outing magazine
- NA = The Newark Advocate
- PS = The Post-Standard (Syracuse, New York)
- **Bold** = Consensus All-American

== See also ==
- 1902 All-Southern college football team
- 1902 All-Western college football team
