= Athletics at the 1904 Summer Olympics – Men's shot put =

Men's shot put at the Games of the III Olympiad
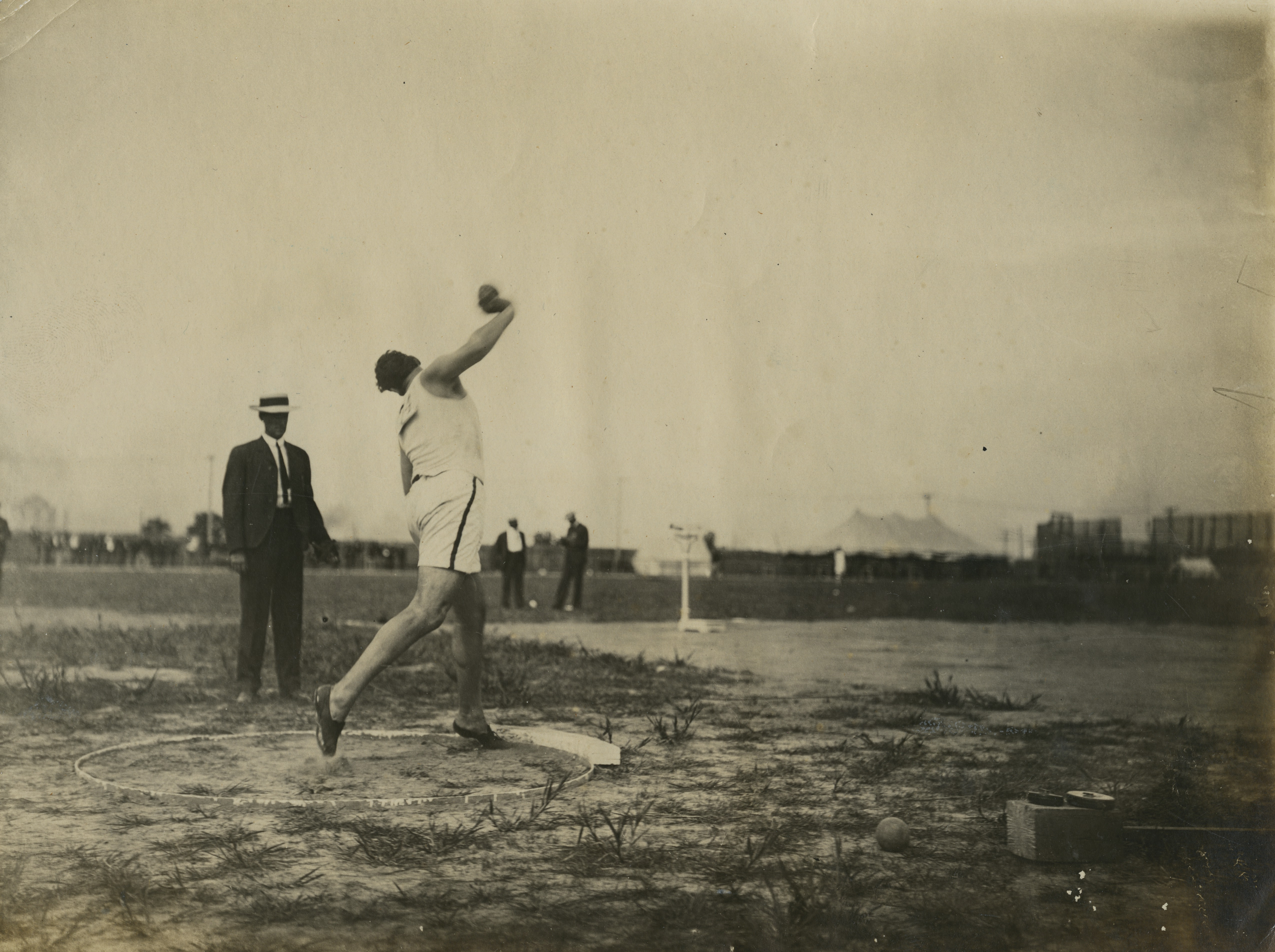
- Ralph Rose putting the shot
- Venue: Francis Field
- Date: August 31, 1904
- Competitors: 8 from 2 nations
- Winning distance: 14.81 =WR, OR

Medalists
1st place, gold medalist(s)		Ralph Rose; United States
2nd place, silver medalist(s)		Wesley Coe; United States
3rd place, bronze medalist(s)		Lawrence Feuerbach; United States

The men's shot put was a track and field athletics event held as part of the Athletics at the 1904 Summer Olympics programme. It was the third time the event was held. The competition was held on August 31, 1904. 8 athletes from 2 nations competed. The event was won by Ralph Rose of the United States, the nation's third consecutive victory in the men's shot put. Americans won silver (Wesley Coe) and bronze (Lawrence Feuerbach) as well, completing the second consecutive podium sweep in the event.

== Background ==
This was the third appearance of the event, which is one of 12 athletics events to have been held at every Summer Olympics. None of the throwers from 1900 returned. Ralph Rose of the United States had broken the world record earlier in 1904 but had not won any major competitions. His countryman, Wesley Coe, had won the AAA championship multiple times. The two were the favorites, with an edge to Rose. As in 1896 and 1900, Irishman Denis Horgan would have been a significant contender but did not attend.

No nations made their debut in the men's shot put this year. Both nations that competed in 1904 were making their third appearance, having competed in 1896 and 1900 as well.

== Competition format ==
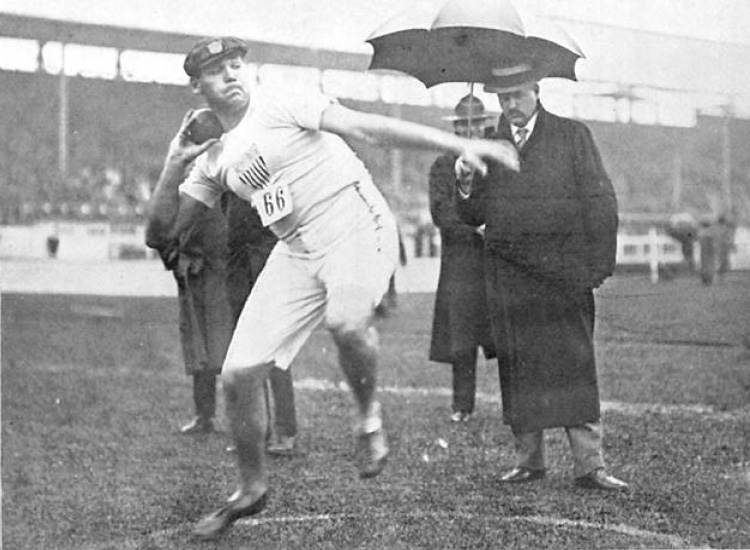
Ralph Rose putting the shot (1908)

The format of the competition is unclear; each there was a single round of throwing with each thrower receiving six attempts. The throwing stage was a 2.13 metre circle, the first time the modern circle was used in the Games rather than a square.

== Records ==
These were the standing world and Olympic records (in metres) prior to the 1904 Summer Olympics.

World record	Ralph Rose (USA)^{*}	14.81	Chicago, United States	21 May 1904
Olympic record	Richard Sheldon (USA)	14.10	Paris, France	15 July 1900

^{*} unofficial

Ralph Rose set a new Olympic record in his first try with 14.35 metres only to be bettered by Wesley Coe in his first try when he threw 14.40 metres. Finally Ralph Rose set a new Olympic record and repeated his own unofficial world record with 14.81 metres in his fifth throw.

== Schedule ==
Date	Time	Round
Wednesday, 31 August 1904		Final

== Results ==
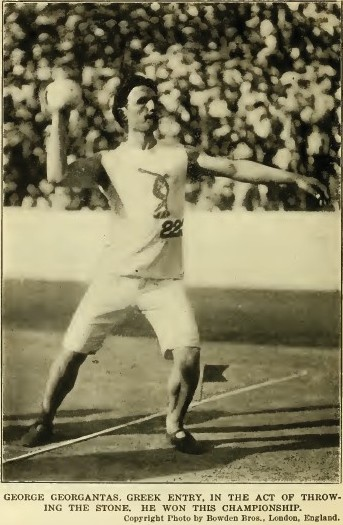
George Georgantas, shown in the stone throwing event in the 1906 Intercalated Games, which he won

Georgantas, the only non-American entrant, withdrew in disgust after officials called his first two attempts fouls for throwing (rather than putting) the shot.

Limited throwing sequences and results are known.

Rank	Athlete	Nation	Distance	Notes
1st place, gold medalist(s)	Ralph Rose	United States	14.81	=WR, OR
2nd place, silver medalist(s)	Wesley Coe	United States	14.40	
3rd place, bronze medalist(s)	Lawrence Feuerbach	United States	13.37	
4	Martin Sheridan	United States	12.39	
5	Charles Chadwick	United States	Unknown	
6	Albert Johnson	United States	Unknown	
7	John Guiney	United States	Unknown	
—	Nikolaos Georgantas	Greece	DSQ	

== Sources ==
- Wudarski, Pawel (1999). "Wyniki Igrzysk Olimpijskich" (in Polish).
