= Sydney George Fisher =

American lawyer

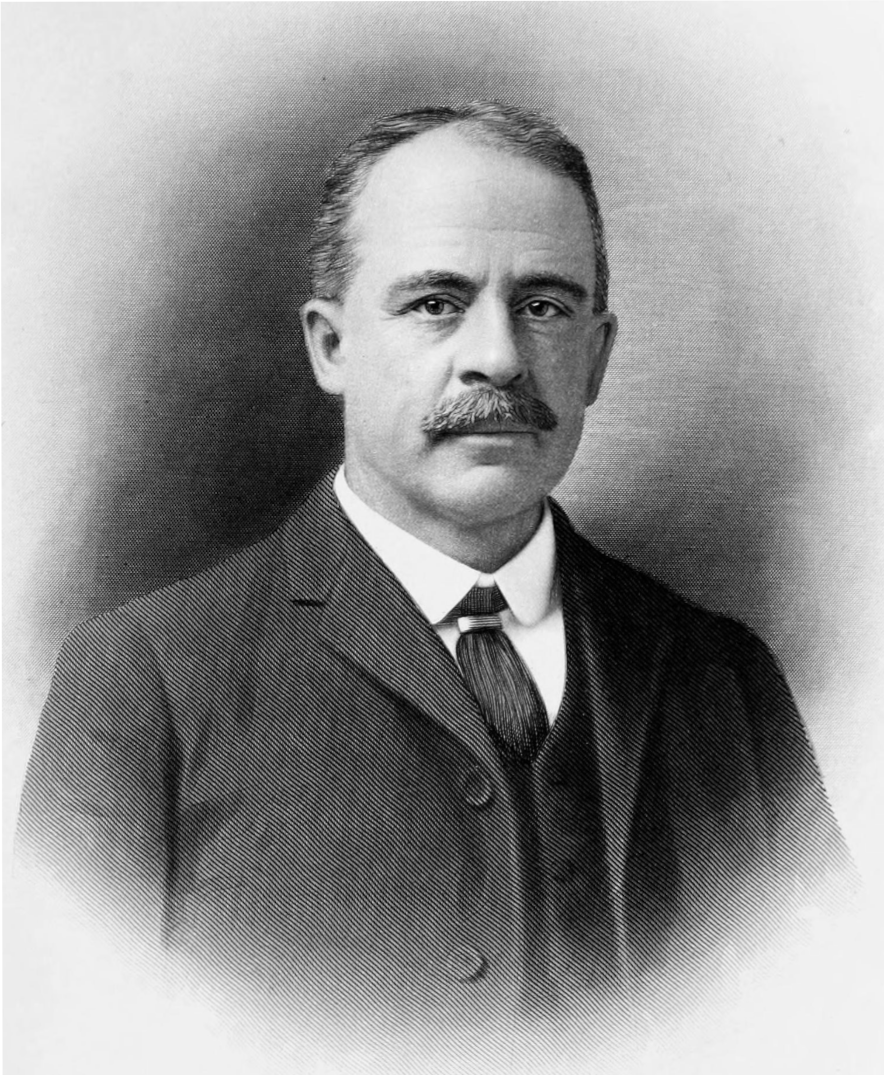
- Born: September 11, 1856; Philadelphia, Pennsylvania
- Died: February 22, 1927 (aged 70); Essington, Pennsylvania
- Education: St. Paul's School; Trinity College; Harvard Law School
- Occupations: Lawyer, historian
- Parents: Elizabeth Fisher (née Ingersoll); Sidney George Fisher

Signature
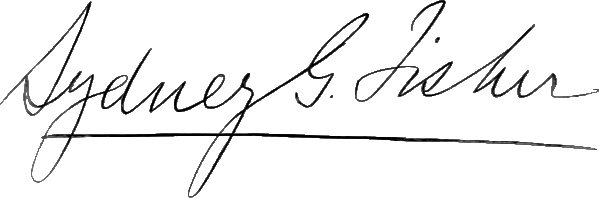

Sydney George Fisher (September 11, 1856 – February 22, 1927) was a United States lawyer and historian, and is best known for his work The True History of the American Revolution.

== Biography ==
Sydney George Fisher was born in Philadelphia on September 11, 1856, the only son of Elizabeth (Ingersoll) and Sidney George Fisher. His father was also a lawyer and historian. Sydney studied at St. Paul's School in Concord, New Hampshire, graduated from Trinity College in Hartford, Connecticut (1879) with a B.A., studied law at the Harvard Law School for two years, and in 1883 was admitted to the bar at Philadelphia and began a law practice. In 1897, he was elected to the American Philosophical Society.

He died at the Corinthian Yacht Club in Essington, Pennsylvania on February 22, 1927.

== Works ==
He was noted for his studies of United States history. His works attained considerable popularity. They include, in addition to numerous magazine articles:

- The Making of Pennsylvania (1896); 2nd edition (1908)
- Pennsylvania, Colony and Commonwealth (1897)
- The Evolution of the Constitution of the United States (1897, and two later editions)
- Men, Women, and Manners in Colonial Times (2 vols., vol. I vol. II, 1898, and two later editions)
- The True Benjamin Franklin (1899, and six later editions)
- The True William Penn (1900, and three later editions)
- The True History of the American Revolution (1902, and four later editions, then greatly revised and issued in 1908 in 2 vols. as The Struggle for American Independence)
- American Education (1917)
- The Quaker Colonies (1919)
