= Gasper Urban =

American football player (1923–1998)

No. 36, 18
- Positions: Guard, linebacker

Personal information
- Born: March 18, 1923; Lynn, Massachusetts, U.S.
- Died: May 17, 1998 (aged 75); St. Augustine, Florida, U.S.
- Listed height: 6 ft 1 in (1.85 m)
- Listed weight: 215 lb (98 kg)

Career information
- High school: Classical (Lynn)
- College: Notre Dame (1943, 1946–1947)
- NFL draft: 1946: 17th round, 160th overall pick

Career history
- Chicago Rockets (1948)

Awards and highlights
- 3× National champion (1943, 1946, 1947)

Career AAFC statistics
- Games played: 14
- Games started: 1
- Interceptions: 1
- Stats at Pro Football Reference

Gasper George Urban (March 18, 1923 – May 17, 1998) was an American professional football player who played one season with the Chicago Rockets of the All-America Football Conference (AAFC). He was selected by the Los Angeles Rams in the 17th round of the 1946 NFL draft. He played college football at the University of Notre Dame.

== Early life ==
Gasper George Urban was born on March 18, 1923, in Lynn, Massachusetts. He played high school football at Lynn Classical High School in Lynn. He was a team captain his senior year in 1941, earning All-North Shore honors and helping Classical win the Class A state title with a 13–0 record.

== College career ==
Urban was a member of the Notre Dame Fighting Irish of the University of Notre Dame from 1942 to 1943. The 1943 Fighting Irish were national champions. He then served in the United States Marine Corps during World War II. He then returned to play for the Fighting Irish from 1946 to 1947 and alternated with George Connor at tackle. Notre Dame won the national championship both seasons. Urban graduated from Notre Dame in 1948.

== Professional career ==
Urban was selected by the Los Angeles Rams in the 17th round, with the 160th overall pick, of the 1946 NFL draft. He signed with the Chicago Rockets of the All-America Football Conference in 1948. He played in all 14 games, starting one, for the Rockets during the 1948 season and recorded one interception. The Rockets finished the year with a 1–13 record. Urban became a free agent after the season.

== Personal life ==
After his football career, Urban became a sales trainee with Paramount Pictures. He was called back into the Marines during the Korean War. He was later a New England branch manager for Columbia Pictures. He died on May 17, 1998, in St. Augustine, Florida.
