= Henry Holt (American football) =

American football player and banker (1881–1955)

Profile
- Position: Center

Personal information
- Born: January 13, 1881; Spuyten Duyvil, Bronx, New York, U.S.
- Died: February 20, 1955 (aged 74); Putnam, Connecticut, U.S.

Career information
- College: Yale University (1901–1902)

Awards and highlights
- 2× Consensus All-American (1901, 1902)

Henry Chandler Holt (January 13, 1881 – February 20, 1955) was an American football player and banker. He played college football at Yale University and was selected as a consensus All-American in 1901. He later worked for the Central Hanover Bank & Trust from 1912 to 1946.

== Early life ==
Holt was born in the Spuyten Duyvil, Bronx section of New York City in 1881. He was the son of federal judge George Chandler Holt. He attended preparatory school at the Phillips Academy in Andover, Massachusetts, before enrolling at Yale.

== Yale ==
Holt attended Yale University. He played for the Yale Bulldogs football team and was selected as a consensus All-American at the center position in both 1901 and 1902. He was a member of Skull and Bones and Delta Kappa Epsilon at Yale. He received his Bachelor of Arts degree from Yale in 1903.

== Later years and family ==
After graduating from Yale, Holt worked for nine years in the railroad business, holding positions first with the Southern Railway and subsequently with the Delaware, Lackawanna and Western Railroad. From 1912 to 1946, he was associated with the Central Hanover Bank & Trust in New York City. In 1920, he was promoted to vice president in 1920. He also served for a time as the president of the Central Hanover Safe Deposit Company. In later years, he was the vice president in charge of Hanover Bank's Madison Avenue and 42nd Street branches before retiring in 1946. Holt was also active in the International Grenfell Association, the New York Women's League for Animals, the 42nd Street Property Owners and Merchants Association, and the Near East College Association.

Holt was married to Margaret Sumner Carson in 1919. They had three children, Margaret Carson Holt (born September 1920), Mary Bowen Holt (born April 1924), and Susanna Aspinwall Holt (born April 1924). Holt lived at Chandler Farms in Pomfret, Connecticut. He died in 1955 at age 74 in Putnam, Connecticut.
