= 1903 All-America college football team =

Official list of the best college football players of 1903

The 1903 All-America college football team is composed of various organizations that chose All-America college football teams that season. The organizations and individuals that chose the teams included Collier's Weekly selected by Walter Camp, Caspar Whitney for Outing magazine, Charles Chadwick and Fielding H. Yost.

Of the 15 players who have been recognized by the NCAA as "consensus" All-Americans for the 1903 season, 12 played for teams in the Ivy League, and nine played for the "Big Four" teams of the era—Harvard, Princeton, Yale, and Penn. The only three consensus All-Americans from schools outside the Ivy League were tackle Fred Schacht of Minnesota, quarterback James Johnson of Carlisle, and halfback Willie Heston of Michigan.

Five players were selected as first-team All-Americans by at least four of the known selectors: guard John DeWitt of Princeton (5), center Henry Hooper of Dartmouth (5), end Charles D. Rafferty of Yale (5), halfback Willie Heston of Michigan (4), and tackle James Hogan of Yale (4). Hooper, who was a freshman in 1903, died three months after the football season ended, following an attack of appendicitis.

In 2008, Sports Illustrated sought to answer the question, "Who would have won the Heisman from 1900-1934?" Its selection for 1903 was Willie Heston of Michigan described as "the nation's finest back."

== All-Americans of 1903 ==
=== Ends ===
- **Howard Henry**, Princeton (WC-1; CW-1; FY-2; CC-1)
- **Charles D. Rafferty**, Yale (WC-1; CW-1; FY-1; CC-1; SA-1)
- Ralph Tipton Davis, Princeton (WC-2)
- Tom Shevlin, Yale (College Football Hall of Fame) (WC-2; CW-2; FY-2; SA-1)
- Curtis Redden, Michigan (WC-3)
- Eddie Rogers, Minnesota (WC-3)
- Edward Bowditch, Harvard (CW-2; FY-1)

=== Tackles ===
- **Daniel Knowlton**, Harvard (WC-1; CW-1; FY-2)
- **James Hogan**, Yale (WC-1; FY-1; CC-1; SA-1)
- **Fred Schacht**, Minnesota (WC-2; CW-1; FY-2)
- Tom Thorp, Columbia (WC-2; CC-1)
- Leigh C. Turner, Dartmouth (WC-3; CW-2)
- Joseph Maddock, Michigan (WC-3; CW-2; FY-1; SA-1)

=== Guards ===
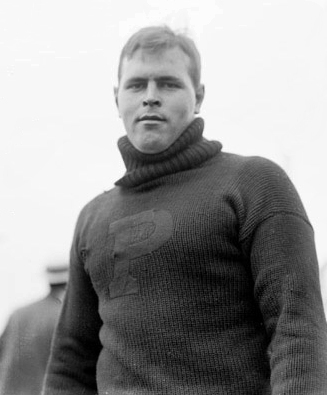
John Dewitt of Princeton.

- **John DeWitt**, Princeton (College Football Hall of Fame) (WC-1; CW-1; FY-1; CC-1; SA-1)
- **Andrew Marshall**, Harvard (WC-1; CW-2; FY-2; CC-1)
- **James Bloomer**, Yale (CW-1; FY-1; SA-1)
- Napoleon Riley, Army (WC-2)
- Joseph Gilman, Dartmouth (WC-2; CW-2)
- Dillon, Princeton (FY-2)
- Wilson Bertke, Wisconsin (WC-3)
- Frank Piekarski, Penn (WC-3)

=== Centers ===
- **Henry Hooper**, Dartmouth (WC-1; CW-1; FY-1; CC-1; SA-1)
- Moses L. Strathern, Minnesota (WC-2)
- Bruce, Columbia (WC-3)
- Short, Princeton (CW-2; FY-2)

=== Quarterbacks ===
- **James Johnson**, Carlisle (College Football Hall of Fame) (WC-1; CW-2)
- **Myron E. Witham**, Dartmouth (WC-2; CW-1)
- Foster Rockwell, Yale (FY-2; CC-1)
- Sigmund Harris, Minnesota (WC-3; FY-1)
- Alfred Brewster, Cornell (SA-1)

=== Halfbacks ===
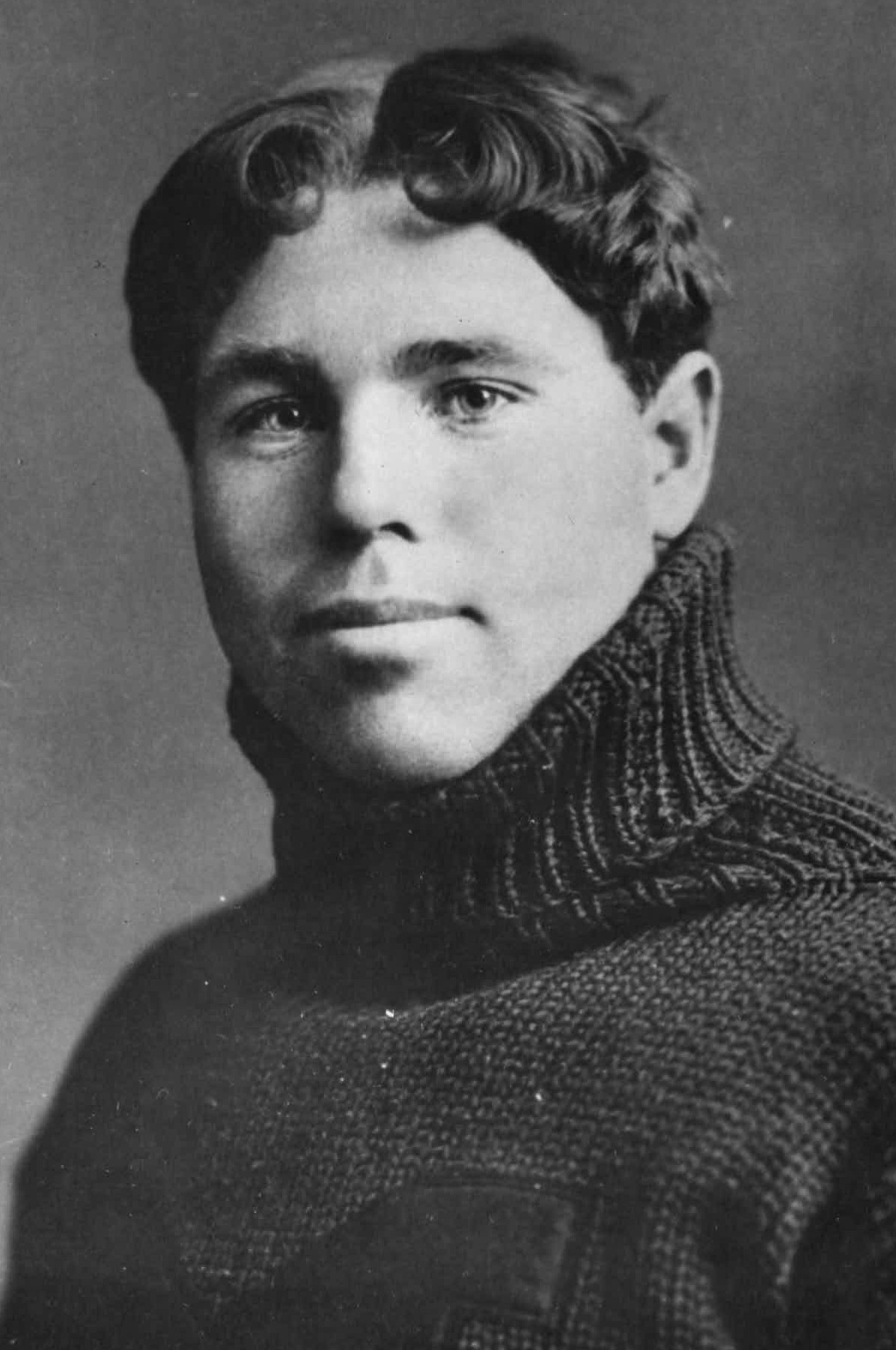
Willie Heston of Michigan.

- **Willie Heston**, Michigan (College Football Hall of Fame) (WC-1; CW-1; FY-1; SA-1)
- **Dana Kafer**, Princeton (WC-1; CW-1; FY-2; SA-1)
- Harold Metcalf, Yale (CC-1)
- John Donaldson Nichols, Harvard (WC-2; FY-2)
- Herb Graver, Michigan (WC-3)
- Tom Stankard, Holy Cross (WC-3)
- Edward Farnsworth, Army (CW-2)
- James Vaughn, Dartmouth (CW-2)

=== Fullbacks ===
- **Richard Shore Smith**, Columbia (WC-1; FY-2)
- **Ledyard Mitchell**, Yale (WC-2 [hb]; CW-1; FY-1 [hb]; CC-1 [hb])
- Henry Schoellkopf, Harvard (FY-1; CC-1; SA-1)
- R. Miller, Princeton (WC-2)
- Louis J. Salmon, Notre Dame (WC-3)
- Frederick A. Prince, Army (CW-2)

=== Key ===
- WC = Collier's Weekly as selected by Walter Camp
- CW = Caspar Whitney, for Outing magazine
- FY = Fielding H. Yost, coach of the University of Michigan football team
- CC = Charles Chadwick, described as "one of the best known coaches and football experts in this country"
- SA = San Antonio Daily Light
- **Bold** – Consensus All-American
- 1 – First Team Selection
- 2 – Second Team Selection
- 3 – Third Team Selection

== See also ==
- 1903 All-Southern college football team
- 1903 All-Western college football team
