= Edward Farnsworth =

American football player, US Army officer, and civil servant

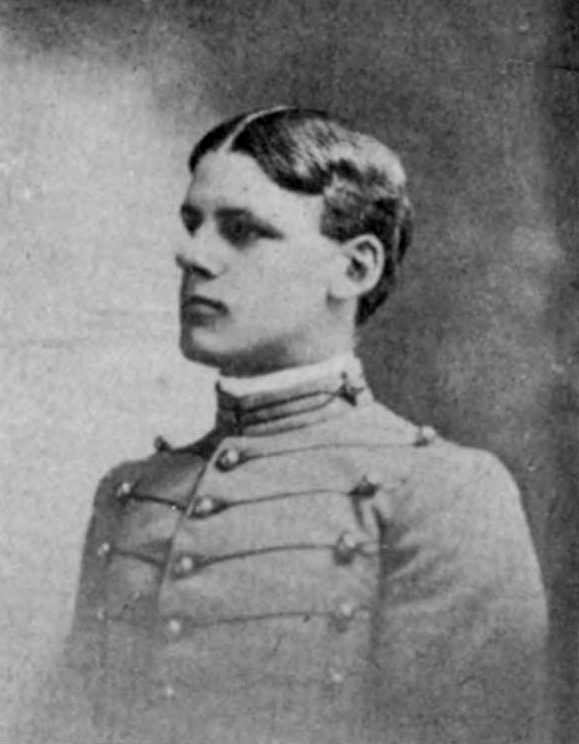
- Farnsworth at West Point in 1904

Profile
- Positions: Halfback, Tackle, Guard

Personal information
- Born: July 30, 1880; Charlestown, New Hampshire, U.S.
- Died: December 19, 1937 (aged 57); South Portland, Maine, U.S.

Career information
- College: U. S. Military Academy (1900–1903)

Awards and highlights
- 2× Second-team All-American (1902, 1903); Third-team All-American (1900)

Edward Ellis Farnsworth (July 30, 1880 – December 19, 1937) was an American football player, an officer in the United States Army and a member of the Maine State Highway Commission. He was thrice selected as an All-American (1900, 1902, 1903) and is the only individual to have played in five Army–Navy Games. He was, additionally, an author and Theosophist.

== Football player ==
Edward Farnsworth was born in Charlestown, New Hampshire on July 30, 1880. He graduated from Classical High School in Lynn, Massachusetts. He subsequently attended the United States Military Academy where he played at the halfback, tackle and guard positions for the Army Black Knights football team from 1899 to 1903. He was selected by Walter Camp as a third-team tackle on his 1900 College Football All-America Team. He was also selected by Caspar Whitney as a second-team All-American at the guard position in 1902 and at the halfback position in 1903. He is also the only individual to have played in five Army–Navy Games, having played in each game from 1899 to 1903.

== Military and civil service ==
After graduating from the Military Academy in 1904, Farnsworth served in the United States Army until 1929, attaining the rank of lieutenant colonel. He received a temporary promotion to colonel during World War I and was advanced to colonel on the retired list in 1930. Farnsworth graduated from the Command and General Staff School in 1923 and the Army War College in 1926. He was assigned to the Eighth Coast Artillery at Portland, Maine from 1923 to 1929. After retiring from the Army, he was appointed by Maine Governor William Tudor Gardiner as a member of the Maine State Highway Commission, a position he held for eight years.

== Dates of rank ==
- Cadet, USMA – June 13, 1899
- 2nd Lieutenant, Regular Army – June 15, 1904
- 1st Lieutenant, Regular Army – January 25, 1907
- Captain, Regular Army – July 25, 1914
- Major, Regular Army (temporary) – August 5, 1917
- Lieutenant Colonel, National Army – June 21, 1918
- Colonel, National Army – October 3, 1918
- Major, Regular Army – July 1, 1920
- Lieutenant Colonel, Regular Army – August 7, 1928
- Lieutenant Colonel, Retired List – October 1, 1929
- Colonel, Retired List – June 21, 1930

== Author ==
Farnsworth is often confused with Edward Clarence Farnsworth who wrote a number of books at the turn of the 20th Century on subjects ranging from poetry and history to the occult, creating a three part series of Theosophical and new age lore involving subjects from Swedenborg to Atlantis.

== Family ==
Farnsworth was married in 1907 to Mary Pullman. Their two sons, Edward Ellis Farnsworth, Jr., and John Pullman Farnsworth, both attended and graduated from the United States Military Academy. Farnsworth died from a heart attack on December 19, 1937, at age 57 in his home in South Portland, Maine.
