= Howard Henry =

American football player (1882–1919)

Profile
- Position: End

Personal information
- Born: June 19, 1882; Philadelphia, Pennsylvania, U.S.
- Died: February 12, 1919 (aged 36); London, England

Career information
- College: Princeton

Awards and highlights
- National champion (1903); Consensus All-American (1903); Third-team All-American (1901)

Howard Houston Henry (June 19, 1882 – February 12, 1919) was an American football player. He played college football for the Princeton Tigers football team and was selected as a consensus All-American at the halfback position in 1903. Before Princeton, Henry was prepped at Germantown Academy graduating with the class of 1899. On June 23, 1904, he was married to Mae Drexel Fell, the daughter of Mrs. Alexander Van Rensselaer of Philadelphia and was a 1902 graduate of Miss Porter's School in Farmington, Connecticut. They had a daughter, Sarah Drexel Henry, born on March 28, 1905. During World War I, he served as a captain in the United States Army. While under the care of Dr. Norris Vaux, he died of heart failure in London, England, on February 12, 1919, at age 36. In 1924, the Howard Henry Memorial Dormitory at Princeton was dedicated in memory of Henry's wartime service. A memorial tablet was also unveiled with the following inscription: "The Class of 1904 - Howard Henry Memorial Dormitory, The Gift of the Class of 1904 and of the Friends of Howard Houston Henry, President of the Class, Captain of the United States Army. Died in the Service of His Country, February 12, 1919."
