= Henry Hooper (American football) =

American football player (1883–1904)

Henry Judson Hooper
Profile
- Position: Center

Personal information
- Born: January 13, 1883; Exeter, New Hampshire, U.S.
- Died: February 28, 1904 (aged 21); Hanover, New Hampshire, U.S.

Career information
- College: Dartmouth (1903)

Awards and highlights
- Consensus All-American (1903)

Henry Judson Hooper (January 13, 1883 – February 28, 1904) was an American football player.

== Biography ==
Hooper was born on January 13, 1883, in Exeter, New Hampshire.

He played college football for the Dartmouth Big Green football and was selected as a consensus All-American at the center position as a freshman in 1903.

In February 1904, Hooper developed appendicitis. He underwent surgery at the Mary Hitchcock Hospital in Hanover, New Hampshire, and died there a short time later. He was 21 years old at the time of his death.

== See also ==
- List of gridiron football players who died during their careers
