= Massachusetts Association for the Blind and Visually Impaired =

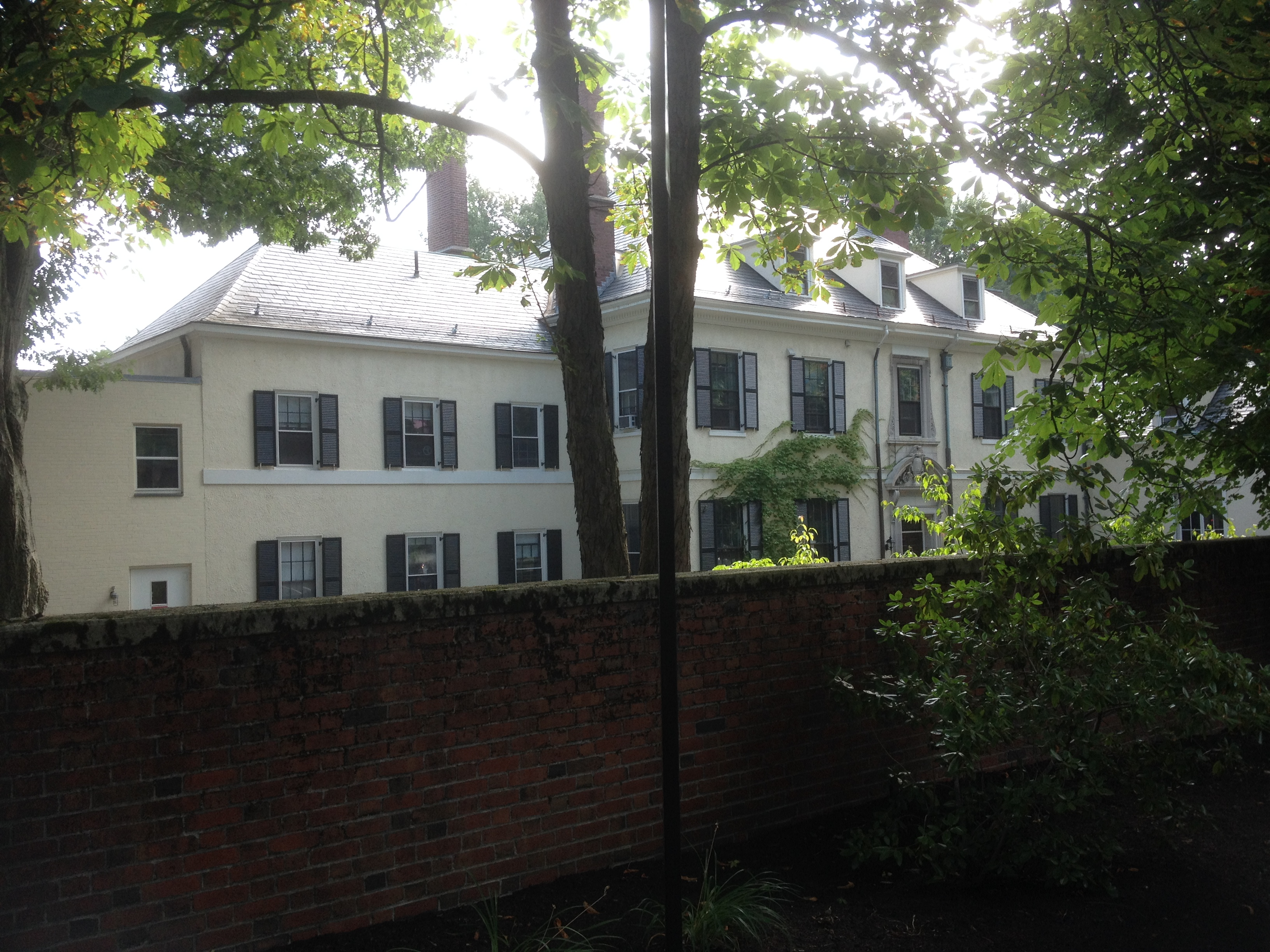
Brookline headquarters for the organization

The Massachusetts Association for the Blind and Visually Impaired is the oldest operational organization in the United States that serves blind adults and elders. It was founded in 1903 as the Massachusetts Association for Promoting the Interests of the Adult Blind. Headquartered in Brookline, Massachusetts, Helen Keller, Julia Ward Howe, and Edward Everett Hale served on the first advisory board. In the 1970s, the Eunice Kennedy Shriver Foundation helped the organization create some of the state's first community-based residential and vocational programs for adults with developmental disabilities.
