= Sidney George Fisher =

Philadelphia lawyer, farmer, and author

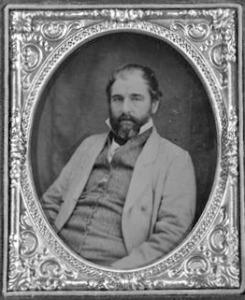
- Born: March 2, 1809; Philadelphia, Pennsylvania, US
- Died: July 25, 1871 (aged 62); Richfield Springs, New York, US
- Resting place: The Woodlands (Philadelphia, Pennsylvania)
- Education: Germantown Academy, Dickinson College
- Occupations: Lawyer; farmer; author; diarist; essayist; poet
- Known for: His diary covering the years 1834–1871, and also his 1862 book Trial of the Constitution
- Political party: Whig
- Spouse: Elizabeth Ingersoll Fisher (1815–1872)
- Children: Sydney George Fisher (1856–1927)

Sidney George Fisher (March 2, 1809 – July 25, 1871) was a Philadelphia lawyer, farmer, plantation owner, diarist, political essayist and occasional poet.

== Early life and education ==
Sidney George Fisher was the eldest of three sons born to James Logan Fisher and Ann Eliza George. His father died when he was five and his mother when he was 12, leaving Sidney and his brothers a considerable inheritance. The three boys—Sidney, James, and Charles—went to live with their aunt Sarah Logan at the family's ancestral home, Wakefield, in Germantown. He was educated at Germantown Academy and Dickinson College.

== Career ==
Fisher read law under Joseph Reed Ingersoll, and prospered as a lawyer, but by the mid-1850s he was practicing law only when it pleased him, and took up more congenial pursuits. Though he begrudged the practice of law, he had friends and relatives in the legal profession, whom he aided infrequently when his assistance was requested.

Fisher wrote several books and delivered numerous talks. Of considerable interest was his highly sought after diary, full of keen, witty and unabashed observations—and often criticisms—about individuals from society, national politics, and his own day-to-day activities. He was largely disconnected from the world of work, except for when he reluctantly agreed to practice law. He did not need to make money (though he never felt his income sufficient), so his views of land speculation and the war against the Second Bank of the United States, the panics, and the commercial activities of those around him are particularly thought-provoking.

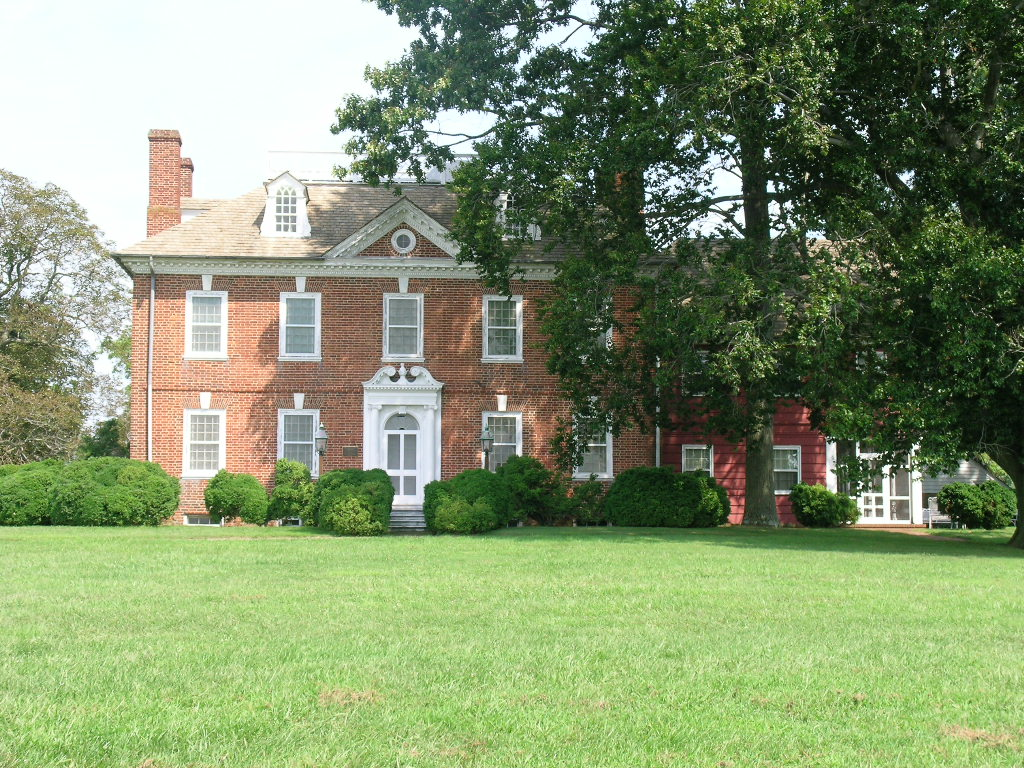
Mt. Harmon mansion

Fisher inherited a plantation, Mount Harmon, on the Sassafras River in Cecil County, Maryland, from his maternal grandfather and namesake, Sidney George. He leased the land to farmers who lived there with their families and paid him rent. Although he was a gentleman farmer, Fisher advised his fellow farmers to diversify beyond grain by seeking out produce that would fill huge demand. During his ownership of Mount Harmon, Fisher wrote about the plantation in his diaries. The originals now reside with the Philadelphia Historical Society. They were published as Mount Harmon Diaries of Sidney George Fisher 1837-1850, edited by W. Emerson Wilson.

Fisher was elected to the American Philosophical Society in 1860.

== Marriage and children ==
Fisher married Elizabeth Ingersoll, granddaughter of Jared Ingersoll and daughter of his mentor, on May 28, 1851. The couple had one son, historian Sydney George Fisher (1856–1927). A few years after his marriage, the family moved to a country residence owned by the Ingersolls called "Forest Hill", located about four miles north of Philadelphia, and that remained Sidney Fisher's home until he died.

== Political and legal views ==
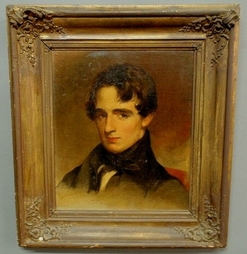
Fisher as a young man, painted by Thomas Sully

As a fervent anti-Democrat, Fisher was a de facto Whig. He lent his support to candidates who opposed the Jacksonian Democrats in national elections, and remained an ardent anti-Democrat his entire life.

Prior to the Civil War, Fisher was a slavery apologist. He agreed with abolitionists that slavery was evil, but argued that it was necessary and served as a form of welfare for a race that would otherwise be a burden on the federal government and the civic institutions of society.

In 1861, Fisher wrote of his newfound support for Abraham Lincoln: "I have had faith in him ever since I read his inaugural speech & his first message. They contain clear proof to my mind of great natural ability, of a wisdom that is above learning, and of an honest, sincere & loving nature....He is the man for this crisis." Also during the Civil War, Fisher obtained a much greater knowledge of southern slavery, which turned him against it, writing in 1863 that, "The war has changed our notions in regard to slavery...we are emancipationists & wish to see slavery destroyed since it has attempted to destroy the nation."

=== Trial of the Constitution ===
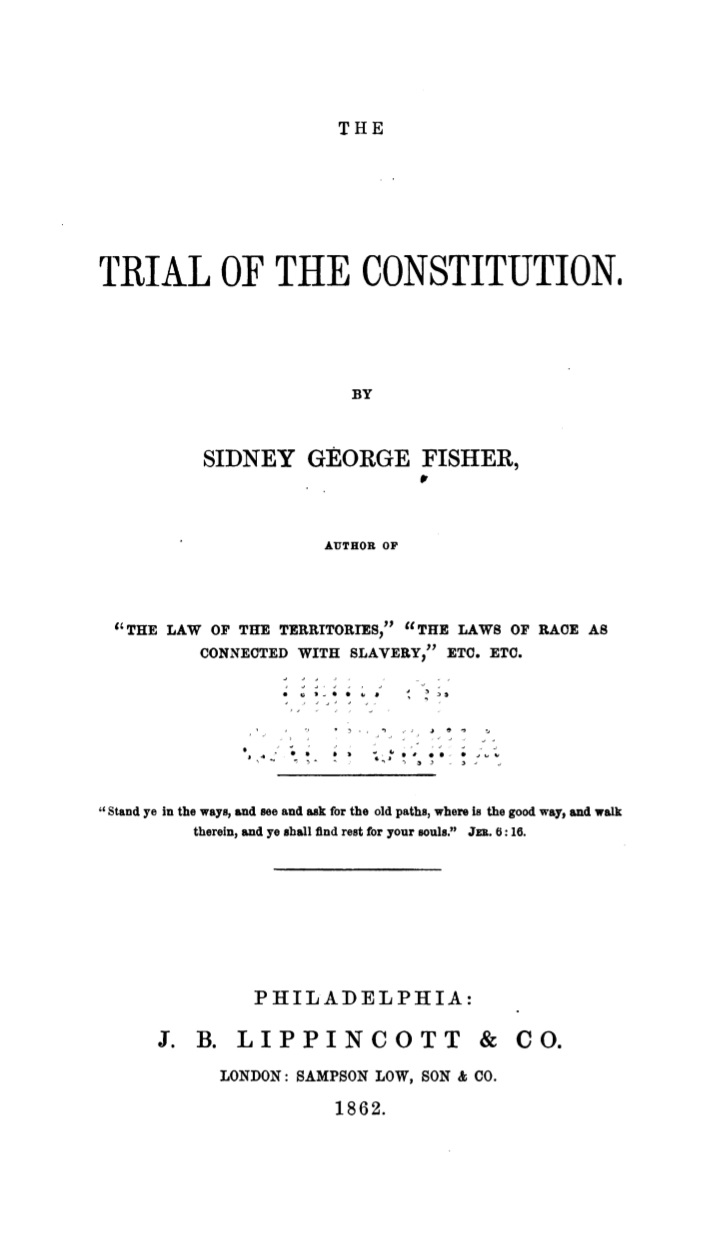
Title page of The Trial of the Constitution (courtesy of University of California and Google Books)

Fisher's most influential and profound achievement was his book The Trial of the Constitution published in 1862. According to the political scientist William H. Riker, that book was the first to interpret the U.S. Constitution "in light of the prevailing European tradition of centralized, responsible government", and it "deserves a permanent place among commentaries on American government...." The historian and political scientist Clinton Rossiter has written of Fisher's book that, "This great book is an eloquent statement of the powers of emergency and self-preservation inherent in the Constitution and government."

A major feature of the book was Fisher's discussion of habeas corpus in the United States, and especially whether a U.S. president has any power to suspend that right. Fisher took the position that U.S. constitutional law regarding habeas corpus was much closer to the British practice under the Habeas Corpus Act 1679 than Fisher's contemporaries such as Horace Binney would admit. More generally, this book by Fisher asserted that precedents from England had been undervalued in U.S. constitutional interpretation, and that they warranted greater recognition.

The historian Mark E. Neely Jr. has written that, "No treatment of the habeas corpus controversy and presidential power would be complete without consideration of Sidney George Fisher, whose place as a constitutional thinker has been magnified by the fact that he wrote the only full-length book on the Constitution in the Civil War that was published during the war itself." According to Neely, Fisher's book was also unique for its time in that it argued for greater congressional power relative to the other branches of government. In the end, though, Neely considers Fisher to be "marginal to debate" because of (among other things) his eccentricities, racism, lack of realism, and Anglophilia.

== Death ==
Fisher suffered from an illness (probably rheumatism) that only the sulfur waters at Richfield Springs, New York seemed to alleviate. He died on July 25, 1871. After his death, his wife and son moved to Germantown, where she died in May 1872.

== Published works ==
- Kanzas and the Constitution (Damrell & Moore, 1856) (under the pseudonym—Cecil)
- Winter Studies in the Country (Parry and M'Millan, 1856)
- Rustic Rhymes (Parry & McMillan, 1859)
- The Law of the Territories (C. Sherman & Son, 1859)
- The Laws of Race, as Connected with Slavery (W. P. Hazard, 1860)
- The Trial of the Constitution (J.B. Lippincott & Co., 1862; reprints in 1969, 1972, 2003)
- A National Currency (J.B. Lippincott & Co., 1864)

=== Orations ===
- The Annual Address delivered before the Belles-lettres and Union Philosophical Societies of Dickinson College, Carlisle, Pa. July 18, 1838 (Carlisle, Pennsylvania: Printed by George M. Philips, 1838)
- Address delivered before the Philadelphia Society for Promoting Agriculture: at their annual exhibition held at the Rising Sun village, October 17, 1850 (Germantown, Pennsylvania: Printed at the office of the Telegraph, 1850) [this address is reprinted in Proceedings of the annual exhibition of the Philadelphia Society for Promoting Agriculture: held at the Rising Sun Village, October 16–17, 1850 (Germantown, Pennsylvania: Printed at the Office of the Telegraph / Philadelphia Society for Promoting Agriculture, 1850)]
- A Report on the Cultivation of Native Grapes for Fruit and for Wine: Read to the Philadelphia Society for Promoting Agriculture, April 2, 1856 (Philadelphia: Inquirer Printing Office, 1856)
- Address Delivered Before the Chester County Agricultural Society, at Their Annual Exhibition Held at West-Chester, September 26, 1857 (Philadelphia: Merrihew & Thompson, printers, 1857)
- Address Delivered Before the Montgomery County Agricultural Society at Their Annual Exhibition Held at Springtown, October 7, 1859, By Sidney George Fisher, of Philadelphia. Published By Order of the Society (Philadelphia: James B. Chandler, Printer, 1859)
- An Address delivered before the Agricultural Society of New Castle County, Delaware, at their annual exhibition held at the Society's farm near Wilmington, October 17, 1860 (Philadelphia: C. Sherman & Son, printers, 1860)
