= D. R. Brown (American football) =

American college football player and coach (1877–1946)

Biographical details
- Born: August 29, 1877; Ackley, Iowa, U.S.
- Died: February 8, 1946 (aged 68); Sioux City, Iowa, U.S.

Playing career
- 1898–1902: Lafayette
- Position: End

Coaching career (HC unless noted)
- 1903: Franklin & Marshall

Head coaching record
- Overall: 5–5–1

Accomplishments and honors

Awards
- Second-team All-American (1902)

David R. Brown (August 29, 1877 – February 8, 1946) was an American college football player and coach. A native of Springfield, South Dakota, he played as an end at Lafayette College from 1898 to 1902. He was a second-team selection by Caspar Whitney on the 1902 All-America college football team. Brown served as the head football coach at Franklin & Marshall College in Lancaster, Pennsylvania for one season, in 1903, compiling a record of 5–5–1.

Brown was born on August 29, 1877, in Ackley, Iowa. Around 1920, he moved from Springfield to Sioux City, Iowa with his brother, where they were both livestock dealers. Brown was president of the Sioux City Livestock Exchange and later a senior member of the Brown, Goff, and Foster livestock commission. He was killed on February 8, 1946, in a fire at his home in Sioux City.

== Head coaching record ==
Year	Team	Overall	Conference	Standing	Bowl/playoffs
Franklin & Marshall (Independent) (1903)
1903	Franklin & Marshall	5–5–1			
Franklin & Marshall:		5–5–1			
Total:		5–5–1			
