= The Advocate (Newark) =

Local daily newspaper of Newark, Ohio

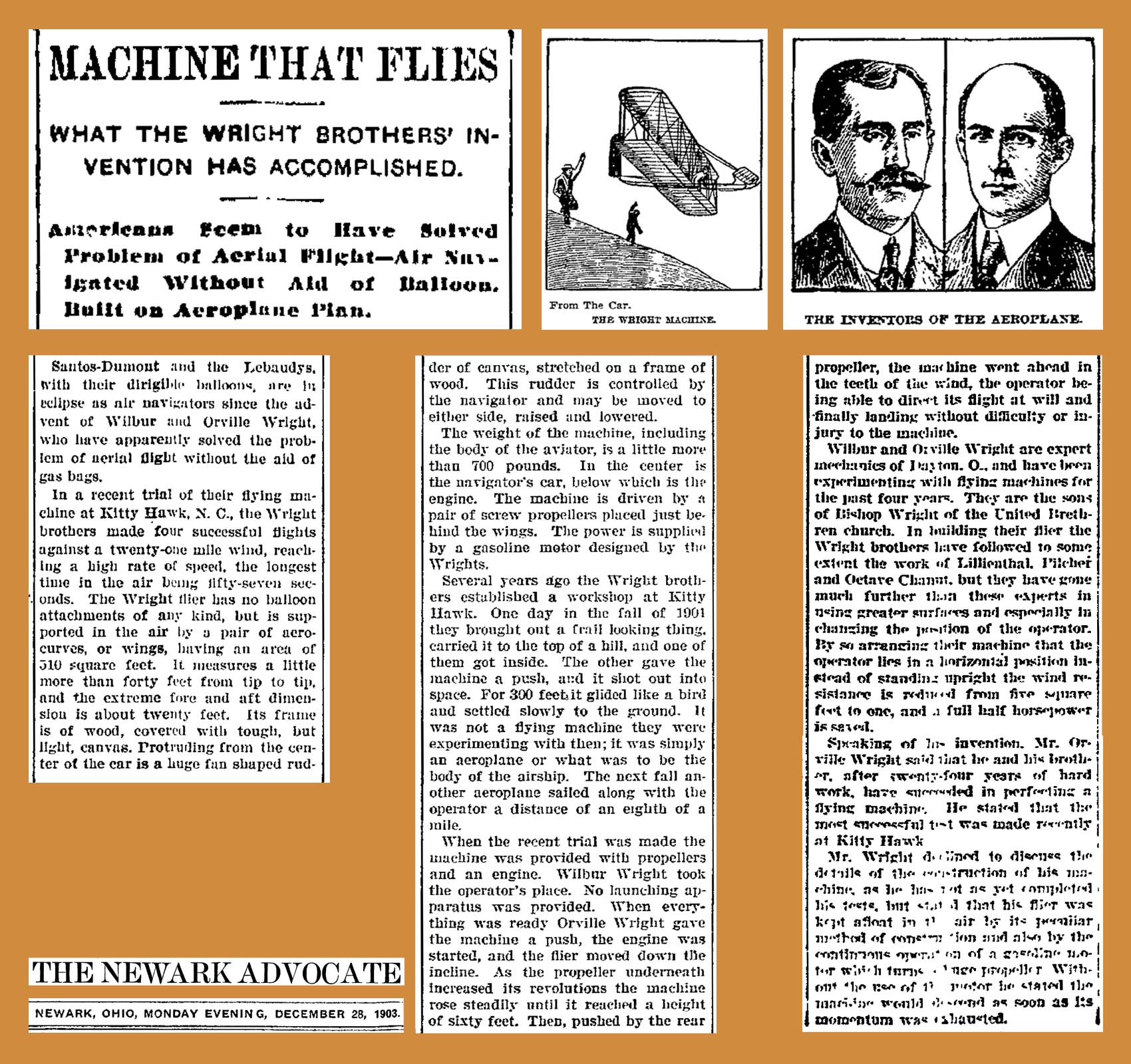
- The Newark Daily Advocate describes the Wright Brothers' flights of December 1903
- Type: Daily newspaper
- Owner: USA Today Co.
- Founder: Benjamin Briggs
- Founded: 1820; 206 years ago
- Language: English
- City: Newark, Ohio
- Country: United States
- ISSN: 0740-2120
- OCLC number: 9898663
- Website: www.newarkadvocate.com

The Advocate is the local daily newspaper of Newark, Ohio, serving the general Licking County region. It has been part of the USA Today Co. family of newspapers and periodicals since 2000.

The Advocate is the single remaining daily newspaper in Newark. Other early Newark newspapers (all now defunct) included the Newark Weekly American, Newark Leader, and Newark American Tribune.

In 1820, a 22-year-old local resident named Benjamin Briggs printed the first issue in a wooden stilt shanty over a frog pond on the west side of what is now Newark's downtown square. Briggs, beset with start-up problems, could only publish three issues in his first five months in business. However, within a year, he was publishing a four-page, four-column paper with the first page devoted to foreign news composed mostly of letters from other papers. During the middle of the century, the paper was a weekly edition, and served as an important regional news source during the American Civil War. In March 1882, the Advocate was sold to John A. Caldwell and soon became a daily newspaper.

Today, the Advocate occupies a 48,000-square-foot (4,500 m^{2}) complex with about 200 employees. It is headquartered at 22 N. First Street in downtown Newark.
