= John Guiney (athlete) =

American shot putter

John Joseph Guiney (June 26, 1882 in Middlesex County, Massachusetts - February 6, 1912 in Bryn Mawr, Pennsylvania) was an American shot putter who placed seventh at the 1904 Summer Olympics.
