= 1902 Howard Crimson and Blue football team =

American college football season

1902 Howard Crimson and Blue football
- Conference: Independent
- Record: 3–1
- Head coach: Houston Gwin (1st season)
- Home stadium: West End Park; Birmingham Fairgrounds

1902 Southern college football independents records
	Conf.			Overall
Team	W	L	T	W		L		T
Oklahoma A&M		–		1	–	0	–	0
Spring Hill		–		1	–	0	–	0
Texas A&M		–		7	–	0	–	2
Marshall		–		5	–	0	–	2
Virginia		–		8	–	1	–	1
South Carolina		–		6	–	1	–	0
Kentucky University		–		7	–	2	–	0
Howard (AL)		–		3	–	1	–	0
North Carolina		–		5	–	1	–	3
Georgetown		–		7	–	3	–	0
Arkansas		–		6	–	3	–	0
Oklahoma		–		6	–	3	–	0
Florida State College		–		2	–	1	–	0
Stetson		–		2	–	1	–	1
West Virginia		–		7	–	4	–	0
VPI		–		3	–	2	–	1
Davidson		–		4	–	4	–	1
East Florida Seminary		–		1	–	1	–	0
Kendall		–		1	–	1	–	0
Louisiana Industrial		–		1	–	1	–	1
Richmond		–		3	–	3	–	0
VMI		–		3	–	3	–	1
William & Mary		–		1	–	1	–	1
Baylor		–		3	–	4	–	2
North Carolina A&M		–		3	–	4	–	2
Maryland		–		3	–	5	–	2
Delaware		–		3	–	5	–	1
Florida Agricultural		–		1	–	2	–	1
Southwestern Louisiana Industrial		–		1	–	2	–	0
Columbian		–		1	–	3	–	0
Navy		–		2	–	7	–	1
TCU		–		0	–	5	–	1
Territorial Normal		–		0	–	1	–	0
Tusculum		–		0	–	1	–	0

The 1902 Howard Crimson and Blue football team was an American football team that represented Howard College (now known as the Samford University) as an independent during the 1902 college football season. In their first year under head coach Houston Gwin, the team compiled a record of 3–1.

== Schedule ==
Date	Opponent	Site	Result	Attendance	Source
October 10	University H.S.	West End Park; Birmingham, AL	W 10–0		
October 25	Marion	Birmingham Fairgrounds; Birmingham, AL	W 6–0		
November 15	Mississippi A&M	West End Park; Birmingham, AL	L 0–26		
November 27	at Marion	Marion, AL	W 32–0	2,000	
