= 1902 North Carolina Tar Heels football team =

American college football season

1902 North Carolina Tar Heels football
- Conference: Independent
- Record: 5–1–3
- Head coach: Herman Olcott (1st season)
- Captain: Frank Foust
- Home stadium: Campus Athletic Field (II)

1902 Southern college football independents records
	Conf.			Overall
Team	W	L	T	W		L		T
Oklahoma A&M		–		1	–	0	–	0
Spring Hill		–		1	–	0	–	0
Texas A&M		–		7	–	0	–	2
Marshall		–		5	–	0	–	2
Virginia		–		8	–	1	–	1
South Carolina		–		6	–	1	–	0
Kentucky University		–		7	–	2	–	0
Howard (AL)		–		3	–	1	–	0
North Carolina		–		5	–	1	–	3
Georgetown		–		7	–	3	–	0
Arkansas		–		6	–	3	–	0
Oklahoma		–		6	–	3	–	0
Florida State College		–		2	–	1	–	0
Stetson		–		2	–	1	–	1
West Virginia		–		7	–	4	–	0
VPI		–		3	–	2	–	1
Davidson		–		4	–	4	–	1
East Florida Seminary		–		1	–	1	–	0
Kendall		–		1	–	1	–	0
Louisiana Industrial		–		1	–	1	–	1
Richmond		–		3	–	3	–	0
VMI		–		3	–	3	–	1
William & Mary		–		1	–	1	–	1
Baylor		–		3	–	4	–	2
North Carolina A&M		–		3	–	4	–	2
Maryland		–		3	–	5	–	2
Delaware		–		3	–	5	–	1
Florida Agricultural		–		1	–	2	–	1
Southwestern Louisiana Industrial		–		1	–	2	–	0
Columbian		–		1	–	3	–	0
Navy		–		2	–	7	–	1
TCU		–		0	–	5	–	1
Territorial Normal		–		0	–	1	–	0
Tusculum		–		0	–	1	–	0

The 1902 North Carolina Tar Heels football team represented the University of North Carolina in the 1902 college football season.

== Schedule ==
Date	Time	Opponent	Site	Result	Attendance	Source
September 24	1:30 p.m.	Guilford	Campus Athletic Field (II); Chapel Hill, NC	W 16–0		
October 4	1:30 p.m.	Oak Ridge Military Academy	Campus Athletic Field (II); Chapel Hill, NC	W 35–0	300	
October 11	2:50 p.m.	Furman	Campus Athletic Field (II); Chapel Hill, NC	W 10–0		
October 18		vs. Davidson	Latta Park; Charlotte, NC	W 27–0	500	
October 25	3:30 p.m.	vs. VPI	Fair Grounds (Roanoke); Roanoke, VA	T 0–0	2,000	
November 1	3:30 p.m.	vs. VMI	Fair Grounds (Roanoke); Lynchburg, VA	W 17–10	1,000	
November 8	3:35 p.m.	at North Carolina A&M	State Fairgrounds (II); Raleigh, NC (rivalry)	T 0–0		
November 15	3:00 p.m.	vs. Georgetown	Lafayette Field; Norfolk, VA	L 5–12	5,000	
November 27	2:45 p.m.	vs. Virginia	Broad Street Park (I); Richmond, VA (South's Oldest Rivalry)	T 12–12	10,000	
