= 1902 VPI football team =

American college football season

1902 VPI football
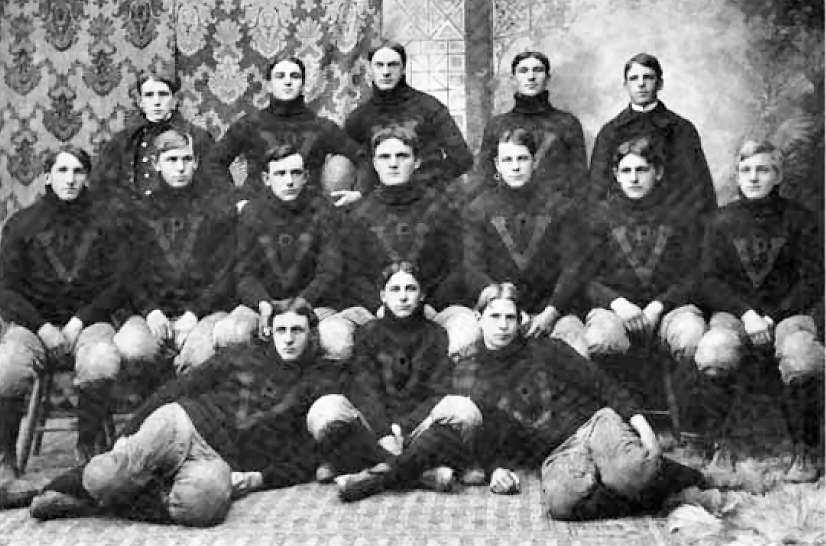
- Conference: Independent
- Record: 3–2–1
- Head coach: R. R. Brown (1st season)
- Captain: Hunter Carpenter
- Home stadium: Gibboney Field

1902 Southern college football independents records
	Conf.			Overall
Team	W	L	T	W		L		T
Oklahoma A&M		–		1	–	0	–	0
Spring Hill		–		1	–	0	–	0
Texas A&M		–		7	–	0	–	2
Marshall		–		5	–	0	–	2
Virginia		–		8	–	1	–	1
South Carolina		–		6	–	1	–	0
Kentucky University		–		7	–	2	–	0
Howard (AL)		–		3	–	1	–	0
North Carolina		–		5	–	1	–	3
Georgetown		–		7	–	3	–	0
Arkansas		–		6	–	3	–	0
Oklahoma		–		6	–	3	–	0
Stetson		–		2	–	1	–	1
East Florida Seminary		–		2	–	1	–	0
Florida State College		–		2	–	1	–	0
West Virginia		–		7	–	4	–	0
VPI		–		3	–	2	–	1
Davidson		–		4	–	4	–	1
Kendall		–		1	–	1	–	0
Louisiana Industrial		–		1	–	1	–	1
Richmond		–		3	–	3	–	0
VMI		–		3	–	3	–	1
William & Mary		–		1	–	1	–	1
Baylor		–		3	–	4	–	2
North Carolina A&M		–		3	–	4	–	2
Maryland		–		3	–	5	–	2
Delaware		–		3	–	5	–	1
Southwestern Louisiana Industrial		–		1	–	2	–	0
Florida Agricultural		–		1	–	3	–	1
Columbian		–		1	–	3	–	0
Navy		–		2	–	7	–	1
TCU		–		0	–	5	–	1
Territorial Normal		–		0	–	1	–	0
Tusculum		–		0	–	1	–	0

The 1902 VPI football team represented Virginia Agricultural and Mechanical College and Polytechnic Institute in the 1902 college football season. The team was led by their head coach R. R. Brown and finished with a record of three wins, three losses, and one tie (3–2–1).

== Schedule ==
Date	Time	Opponent	Site	Result	Attendance	Source
October 13	3:00 p.m.	vs. Washington and Lee	Fair Grounds; Lynchburg, VA	L 0–6		
October 18		North Carolina A&M	Gibboney Field; Blacksburg, VA	W 11–6		
October 25	3:30 p.m.	vs. North Carolina	Athletic Park; Roanoke, VA	T 0–0	2,500–3,000	
November 8	3:30 p.m.	Georgetown	Gibboney Field; Blacksburg, VA	W 28–0		
November 15	4:00 p.m.	at Virginia	Madison Hall Field; Charlottesville, VA (rivalry)	L 0–6	1,000	
November 27	2:30 p.m.	vs. VMI	Lafayette Field; Norfolk, VA (rivalry)	W 50–5	6,000	

== Before the season ==
The 1901 VPI football team compiled a 6–1 record and were led by A. B. Morrison Jr. in his only season as head coach.

== Game summaries ==
=== Washington and Lee ===
Washington & Lee vs. VPI

Team	1	2	Total
• W&L	0	6	6
VPI	0	0	0

- Date: October 13, 1902
- Location: Fair Grounds
  Lynchburg, VA
- Game start: 3:00 p.m.
- Referee: Dr. Morrison

The starting lineup for VPI was: Miller (left end), Lewis (left tackle), Willson (left guard), Stiles (center), McCulloch (right guard), Counselman (right tackle), Glenn (right end), Campbell (quarterback), Syke (left halfback), Carpenter (right halfback), Miles (fullback). The substitutes were: Ogburn, Palmer, Robins, and Walsh.

The starting lineup for Washington and Lee was: A. McD. Smith (left end), Charles McNeill (left tackle), James Sterrett (left guard), Thomas Stone (center), Lonnie Howell (right guard), Americus Trundle (right tackle), George Ross (right end), M. B. Marshall (quarterback), Malcolm Campbell (left halfback), George Haw (right halfback), James Walker (fullback). The substitutes were: Edward Dawson, Frank Dotson, Hugh Harle, Garrett Judy, Argyle Smiley and Arthur Tabb.

=== North Carolina A&M ===
North Carolina A&M vs. VPI

Team	1	2	Total
NC A&M	6	0	6
• VPI	5	6	11

- Date: October 18, 1902
- Location: Gibboney Field
  Blacksburg, VA
- Referee: R. R. Brown

After their loss to Washington and Lee, VPI played the North Carolina College of Agriculture and Mechanic Arts at Gibboney Field.

The starting lineup for VPI was: Miler (left end), Blair (left tackle), McCulloch (left guard), Stiles (center), Wilson (right guard), Miles (right tackle), Robins (right end), Sykes (quarterback), Campbell (left halfback), Carpenter (right halfback), Counselman (fullback). The substitutes were: Ware.

The starting lineup for North Carolina A&M was: Tucker (left end), Oliver Max Gardner (left tackle), Beebe (left guard), Fred Hadley (center), LeRoy Abernethy (right guard), V. L. Neal (right tackle), Joseph Gulley (right end), Walter Darden (quarterback), Ward Shannonhouse (left halfback), C. D. Welch (right halfback), Roberson (fullback).

=== North Carolina ===
North Carolina vs. VPI

Team	1	2	Total
UNC	0	0	0
VPI	0	0	0

- Date: October 25, 1902
- Location: Athletic Park
  Roanoke, VA
- Game start: 3:30 p.m.
- Game attendance: 2,500–3,000
- Game weather: "very warm"
- Referee: Bill Armstrong

The starting lineup for VPI was: Miller (left end), Blair (left tackle), Wilson (left guard), Stiles (center), McCulloch (right guard), Miles (right tackle), Campbell (right end), Ware (quarterback), Byrd (left halfback), Carpenter (right halfback), Counselman (fullback). The substitutes were: Brent, Robins, Sykes, Tinsley and Walsh.

The starting lineup for North Carolina was: William Fisher (left end), Frank Foust (left tackle), J. Donnelly (left guard), Roach Stewart (center), Newton Farlow (right guard), George Jones (right tackle), Newman Townsend (right end), Louis Graves (quarterback), J. E. Mann (left halfback), William Jacocks (right halfback), Engle (fullback). The substitutes were: William Carr, Marshall Glenn, Earle Holt, Harry Jones, Sprunt Newton, Olcott and Wade Oldham.

=== Georgetown ===
Georgetown vs. VPI

Team	1	2	Total
Georgetown	0	0	0
• VPI	16	12	28

- Date: November 8, 1902
- Location: Gibboney Field
  Blacksburg, VA
- Game start: 3:30 p.m.
- Referee: M. J. Thompson (Georgetown)

The starting lineup for VPI was: Miller (left end), Willson (left tackle), Garber (left guard), Stiles (center), McCulloch (right guard), Miles (right tackle), Campbell (right end), Bear (quarterback), Byrd (left halfback), Carpenter (right halfback), Counselman (fullback). The substitutes were: Tinsley.

The starting lineup for Georgetown was: Preston Edmonston (left end), Murray Russell (left tackle), Alexander Rorke (left guard), Percy Given (center), Matt Mahoney (right guard), Joe Seitz (right tackle), Sam Edmonston (right end), Tommy Buckley (quarterback), Joe Reilly (left halfback), Hub Hart (right halfback), Tom Hardesty (fullback). The substitutes were: Ray Abbaticchio and Joe Devlin.

=== Virginia ===
VPI at Virginia

Team	1	2	Total
VPI	0	0	0
• UVA	6	0	6

- Date: November 15, 1902
- Location: Madison Hall Field
  Charlottesville, VA
- Game start: 4:00 p.m.
- Game attendance: 1,000
- Referee: Baird

The starting lineup for VPI was: Miller (left end), Willson (left tackle), Garber (left guard), Stiles (center), McCulloch (right guard), Blair (right tackle), Campbell (right end), Bear (quarterback), Byrd (left halfback), Carpenter (right halfback), Counselman (fullback). The substitutes were: Miles.

The starting lineup for Virginia was: Edward Daniel (left end), Henry Johnson (left tackle), Augustus Houston (left guard), Nathan Bachman (center), William Spates (right guard), Walter Council (right tackle), Thomas Bronston (right end), John Beverly Pollard (quarterback), Karl Pritchard (left halfback), Marshall Hall (right halfback), Franklin Harris (fullback). The substitutes were: Wistar Heald and Harry Wall.

=== VMI ===
The starting lineup for VPI was: Robins (left end), Willson (left tackle), Grayhill (left guard), Stiles (center), McCulloch (right guard), Miles (right tackle), Campbell (right end), Bear (quarterback), Byrd (left halfback), Carpenter (right halfback), Counselman (fullback).

The starting lineup for VMI was: William Couper (left end), Stephen Pace (left tackle), Jefferson Sinclair (left guard), Sidney Lee (center), Lewis Leftwich (right guard), Ralph DeVoe (right tackle), Marshall Milton (right end), George Dewey (quarterback), John Paul (left halfback), Ralph Claggett (right halfback), Edward Johnson (fullback). The substitutes were: R. Johnson.

== Players ==
The following players were members of the 1902 football team according to the roster published in the 1903 edition of The Bugle, the Virginia Tech yearbook.

VPI 1902 roster
Quarterback: Charles Edgar Bear; Guards: John Graber; McCullough; Tackles: William Leonard Blair; Sally Miles; George Cralle Willson; Center: Joseph Clay Stiles	Ends: Creighton Childs Campbell; Miller; Wilmer Nelson Robins; Joe Ware; Halfbacks: Clarence Byrd; Hunter Carpenter (Capt.); Fullback: John Counselman	Substitutes: Thomas Newton Brent; William Rowzie Crute; John Wilson Glenn; Archer Phlegar Graybill; Thomas Walker Lewis; Alpheus Cabell Ogburn, Jr.; Palmer; G. Sykes; Robert Bruce Tinsley; Walsh

== Coaching and training staff ==
- Head coach: R. R. Brown
- Manager: Guy Aubrey Chalkley
- Assistant manager: Frank Marshall Yost

== See also ==
- 1902 College Football All-Southern Team
