= 1902 Louisiana Industrial football team =

American college football season

1902 Louisiana Industrial football
- Conference: Independent
- Record: 1–1–1
- Head coach: Frank Singleton & Howard F. Crandell (1st season)

1902 Southern college football independents records
	Conf.			Overall
Team	W	L	T	W		L		T
Oklahoma A&M		–		1	–	0	–	0
Spring Hill		–		1	–	0	–	0
Texas A&M		–		7	–	0	–	2
Marshall		–		5	–	0	–	2
Virginia		–		8	–	1	–	1
South Carolina		–		6	–	1	–	0
Kentucky University		–		7	–	2	–	0
Howard (AL)		–		3	–	1	–	0
North Carolina		–		5	–	1	–	3
Georgetown		–		7	–	3	–	0
Arkansas		–		6	–	3	–	0
Oklahoma		–		6	–	3	–	0
Florida State College		–		2	–	1	–	0
Stetson		–		2	–	1	–	1
West Virginia		–		7	–	4	–	0
VPI		–		3	–	2	–	1
Davidson		–		4	–	4	–	1
East Florida Seminary		–		1	–	1	–	0
Kendall		–		1	–	1	–	0
Louisiana Industrial		–		1	–	1	–	1
Richmond		–		3	–	3	–	0
VMI		–		3	–	3	–	1
William & Mary		–		1	–	1	–	1
Baylor		–		3	–	4	–	2
North Carolina A&M		–		3	–	4	–	2
Maryland		–		3	–	5	–	2
Delaware		–		3	–	5	–	1
Florida Agricultural		–		1	–	2	–	1
Southwestern Louisiana Industrial		–		1	–	2	–	0
Columbian		–		1	–	3	–	0
Navy		–		2	–	7	–	1
TCU		–		0	–	5	–	1
Territorial Normal		–		0	–	1	–	0
Tusculum		–		0	–	1	–	0

The 1902 Louisiana Industrial football team was an American football team that represented the Louisiana Industrial Institute (now known as Louisiana Tech University) as an independent during the 1902 college football season. In their first and only year under head coaches Frank Singleton and Howard F. Crandell, the team compiled a 1–1–1 record. Despite the season being listed in the Louisiana Tech football record book, the season is not recognized as having been played by the NCAA.

== Schedule ==
Date	Opponent	Site	Result	Source
October 25	Monroe Athletic Association	Ruston, LA	W 6–5	
November 6	at Shreveport Athletic Association	Shreveport Baseball Park; Shreveport, LA	L 0–35	
November 27	at Monroe Athletic Association	Monroe, LA	T 0–0	
