= 1902 TCU football team =

American college football season

1902 TCU football
- Conference: Independent
- Record: 0–5–1
- Head coach: H. E. Hildebrand (1st season)

1902 Southern college football independents records
	Conf.			Overall
Team	W	L	T	W		L		T
Oklahoma A&M		–		1	–	0	–	0
Spring Hill		–		1	–	0	–	0
Texas A&M		–		7	–	0	–	2
Marshall		–		5	–	0	–	2
Virginia		–		8	–	1	–	1
South Carolina		–		6	–	1	–	0
Kentucky University		–		7	–	2	–	0
Howard (AL)		–		3	–	1	–	0
North Carolina		–		5	–	1	–	3
Georgetown		–		7	–	3	–	0
Arkansas		–		6	–	3	–	0
Oklahoma		–		6	–	3	–	0
Florida State College		–		2	–	1	–	0
Stetson		–		2	–	1	–	1
West Virginia		–		7	–	4	–	0
VPI		–		3	–	2	–	1
Davidson		–		4	–	4	–	1
East Florida Seminary		–		1	–	1	–	0
Kendall		–		1	–	1	–	0
Louisiana Industrial		–		1	–	1	–	1
Richmond		–		3	–	3	–	0
VMI		–		3	–	3	–	1
William & Mary		–		1	–	1	–	1
Baylor		–		3	–	4	–	2
North Carolina A&M		–		3	–	4	–	2
Maryland		–		3	–	5	–	2
Delaware		–		3	–	5	–	1
Florida Agricultural		–		1	–	2	–	1
Southwestern Louisiana Industrial		–		1	–	2	–	0
Columbian		–		1	–	3	–	0
Navy		–		2	–	7	–	1
TCU		–		0	–	5	–	1
Territorial Normal		–		0	–	1	–	0
Tusculum		–		0	–	1	–	0

The 1902 TCU football team represented Texas Christian University (TCU) as an independent during the 1902 college football season. The school was renamed Texas Christian University in 1902 and was previously known as Add–Ran University. They played their home games in Waco, Texas.

== Schedule ==
Date	Time	Opponent	Site	Result	Source
October 20		Trinity (TX)	Waco, TX	L 0–28	
November 1		at Baylor	Carroll Field; Waco, TX (rivalry)	T 0–0	
November 15		Texas A&M	Waco, TX (rivalry)	L 0–22	
November 22		Baylor	Carroll Field; Waco, TX	L 0–6	
November 27	3:30 p.m.	at Trinity (TX)	Trinity Athletic Field; Waxahachie, TX	L 0–17	
December 1		Baylor	West End Park; Waco, TX	L 0–20	
