= 1902 Texas A&M Aggies football team =

American college football season

1902 Texas A&M Aggies football
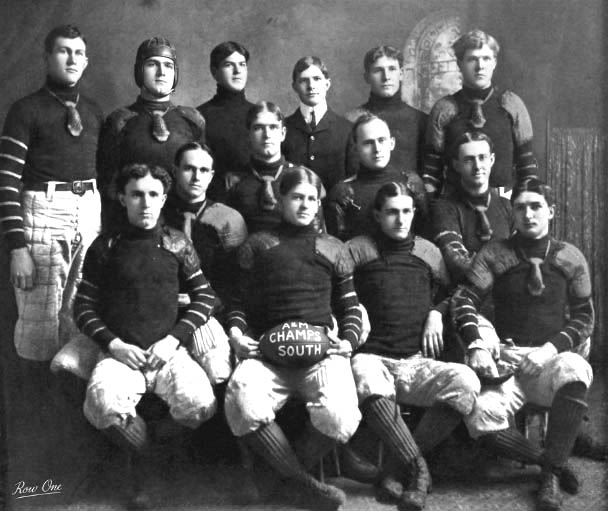
- Conference: Independent
- Record: 7–0–2
- Head coach: J. E. Platt (1st season)

1902 Southern college football independents records
	Conf.			Overall
Team	W	L	T	W		L		T
Oklahoma A&M		–		1	–	0	–	0
Spring Hill		–		1	–	0	–	0
Texas A&M		–		7	–	0	–	2
Marshall		–		5	–	0	–	2
Virginia		–		8	–	1	–	1
South Carolina		–		6	–	1	–	0
Kentucky University		–		7	–	2	–	0
Howard (AL)		–		3	–	1	–	0
North Carolina		–		5	–	1	–	3
Georgetown		–		7	–	3	–	0
Arkansas		–		6	–	3	–	0
Oklahoma		–		6	–	3	–	0
Florida State College		–		2	–	1	–	0
Stetson		–		2	–	1	–	1
West Virginia		–		7	–	4	–	0
VPI		–		3	–	2	–	1
Davidson		–		4	–	4	–	1
East Florida Seminary		–		1	–	1	–	0
Kendall		–		1	–	1	–	0
Louisiana Industrial		–		1	–	1	–	1
Richmond		–		3	–	3	–	0
VMI		–		3	–	3	–	1
William & Mary		–		1	–	1	–	1
Baylor		–		3	–	4	–	2
North Carolina A&M		–		3	–	4	–	2
Maryland		–		3	–	5	–	2
Delaware		–		3	–	5	–	1
Florida Agricultural		–		1	–	2	–	1
Southwestern Louisiana Industrial		–		1	–	2	–	0
Columbian		–		1	–	3	–	0
Navy		–		2	–	7	–	1
TCU		–		0	–	5	–	1
Territorial Normal		–		0	–	1	–	0
Tusculum		–		0	–	1	–	0

The 1902 A&M Aggies football team represented the Agricultural and Mechanical College of Texas—now known as Texas A&M University—as an independent during the 1902 college football season. Led by first-year head coach J. E. Platt, the Aggies compiled a record of 7–0–2.

== Schedule ==
Date	Time	Opponent	Site	Result	Source
October 4		St. Edward's (TX)	College Station, TX	W 11–0	
October 6		at Trinity (TX)	Trinity University campus; Waxahachie, TX	T 0–0	
October 11		vs. Baylor	Fairgrounds; Dallas, TX (rivalry)	W 11–6	
October 14		Baylor	Fairgrounds; Bryan, TX	W 22–0	
October 25	11:45 a.m.	vs. Texas	Fair grounds; San Antonio, TX (rivalry)	T 0–0	
November 8		Tulane	Fairgrounds; Bryan, TX	W 17–5	
November 15		vs. TCU	Waco, TX (rivalry)	W 22–0	
November 21		vs. Trinity (TX)	Houston, TX	W 34–0	
November 27		at Texas	Varsity Athletic Field; Austin, TX	W 11–0	
