= W. W. Hughes =

American football player and coach

Biographical details
- Education: Vanderbilt University

Coaching career (HC unless noted)
- 1902–1903: Florida State College

Head coaching record
- Overall: 5–3–1

W. W. Hughes was an American football player and coach former head coach of the Florida State college football program from 1902 to 1903. He was the first person to coach collegiate football at Florida State University, then known as Florida State College. Over two years, Hughes compiled a record of 5–3–1.

Hughes was a player for Vanderbilt University, and was a Latin professor at Florida State College. Upon his arrival at the college, he volunteered to coach the school's first football team. He was succeeded in 1904 by Jack Forsythe.

== Head coaching record ==
Year	Team	Overall	Conference	Standing	Bowl/playoffs
Florida State College (Independent) (1902–1903)
1902	Florida State College	2–1			
1903	Florida State College	3–2–1			
Florida State College:		5–3–1			
Total:		5–3–1			
