= Ashby Woodson =

American football coach

Biographical details
- Born: December 27, 1877; Charlottesville, Virginia, U.S.
- Died: May 28, 1929 (aged 51); New Orleans, Louisiana, U.S.

Coaching career (HC unless noted)
- 1901–1902: Southwestern Louisiana Industrial

Head coaching record
- Overall: 3–2

Ashby A. Woodson (December 27, 1877 – May 28, 1929) was an American college football coach and manual training instructor. He was the first head football coach at Southwestern Louisiana Industrial Institute—now known as the University of Louisiana at Lafayette—serving for two seasons, from 1901 to 1902, and compiling a record of 3–2. He also served as the school's first instructor of manual training, having arrived from the Miller School in Virginia.

Woodson was born in Charlottesville, Virginia. He graduated from the Miller School there in 1895. Woodson was a member of the faculty at Southwestern Louisiana from the school's opening in 1901 until his death in 1929. He earned a Bachelor of Science degree from Southwestern Louisiana in 1921 and two degrees from Tulane University, a Bachelor of Engineering in 1923 and a Master of Engineering in 1927. Woodson died on May 28, 1929, at the Hotel Dieu in New Orleans, Louisiana, after a three-month-long illness. He was the head of the department of engineering at Southwestern Louisiana at the time of his death.

== Head coaching record ==
Year	Team	Overall	Conference	Standing	Bowl/playoffs
Southwestern Louisiana Industrial (Independent) (1901–1902)
1901	Southwestern Louisiana Industrial	2–0			
1902	Southwestern Louisiana Industrial	1–2			
Southwestern Louisiana Industrial:		3–2			
Total:		3–2			
