= 1902 Davidson football team =

American college football season

1902 Davidson football
- Conference: Independent
- Record: 4–4–1
- Head coach: John A. Brewin (3rd season)

1902 Southern college football independents records
	Conf.			Overall
Team	W	L	T	W		L		T
Oklahoma A&M		–		1	–	0	–	0
Spring Hill		–		1	–	0	–	0
Texas A&M		–		7	–	0	–	2
Marshall		–		5	–	0	–	2
Virginia		–		8	–	1	–	1
South Carolina		–		6	–	1	–	0
Kentucky University		–		7	–	2	–	0
Howard (AL)		–		3	–	1	–	0
North Carolina		–		5	–	1	–	3
Georgetown		–		7	–	3	–	0
Arkansas		–		6	–	3	–	0
Oklahoma		–		6	–	3	–	0
Florida State College		–		2	–	1	–	0
Stetson		–		2	–	1	–	1
West Virginia		–		7	–	4	–	0
VPI		–		3	–	2	–	1
Davidson		–		4	–	4	–	1
East Florida Seminary		–		1	–	1	–	0
Kendall		–		1	–	1	–	0
Louisiana Industrial		–		1	–	1	–	1
Richmond		–		3	–	3	–	0
VMI		–		3	–	3	–	1
William & Mary		–		1	–	1	–	1
Baylor		–		3	–	4	–	2
North Carolina A&M		–		3	–	4	–	2
Maryland		–		3	–	5	–	2
Delaware		–		3	–	5	–	1
Florida Agricultural		–		1	–	2	–	1
Southwestern Louisiana Industrial		–		1	–	2	–	0
Columbian		–		1	–	3	–	0
Navy		–		2	–	7	–	1
TCU		–		0	–	5	–	1
Territorial Normal		–		0	–	1	–	0
Tusculum		–		0	–	1	–	0

The 1902 Davidson football team was an American football team that represented the Davidson College as an independent during the 1902 college football season. In their third year under head coach John A. Brewin, the team compiled a 4–4–1 record.

== Schedule ==
Date	Opponent	Site	Result	Attendance	Source
October 1	Oak Ridge Institute	Davidson, NC	W 28–5		
October 10	Furman	Davidson, NC	L 0–6		
October 18	vs. North Carolina	Latta Park Baseball Field; Charlotte, NC	L 0–27	500	
October 24	Bingham Military School	Davidson, NC	W 16–6		
November 1	at Virginia	Madison Hall Field; Charlottesville, VA	L 0–35		
November 13	at Georgia Tech	Brisbine Park; Atlanta, GA	W 7–6		
November 14	at Georgia	Herty Field; Athens, GA	L 0–20		
November 21	vs. North Carolina A&M	Greensboro, NC	W 5–0		
November 22	at Guilford	Greensboro, NC	T 0–0		
