= 1902 Georgetown Blue and Gray football team =

American college football season

1902 Georgetown Blue and Gray football
- Conference: Independent
- Record: 7–3
- Head coach: Billy Suter (1st season)
- Captain: Joe Reilly
- Home stadium: Georgetown Field

1902 Southern college football independents records
	Conf.			Overall
Team	W	L	T	W		L		T
Oklahoma A&M		–		1	–	0	–	0
Spring Hill		–		1	–	0	–	0
Texas A&M		–		7	–	0	–	2
Marshall		–		5	–	0	–	2
Virginia		–		8	–	1	–	1
South Carolina		–		6	–	1	–	0
Kentucky University		–		7	–	2	–	0
Howard (AL)		–		3	–	1	–	0
North Carolina		–		5	–	1	–	3
Georgetown		–		7	–	3	–	0
Arkansas		–		6	–	3	–	0
Oklahoma		–		6	–	3	–	0
Florida State College		–		2	–	1	–	0
Stetson		–		2	–	1	–	1
West Virginia		–		7	–	4	–	0
VPI		–		3	–	2	–	1
Davidson		–		4	–	4	–	1
East Florida Seminary		–		1	–	1	–	0
Kendall		–		1	–	1	–	0
Louisiana Industrial		–		1	–	1	–	1
Richmond		–		3	–	3	–	0
VMI		–		3	–	3	–	1
William & Mary		–		1	–	1	–	1
Baylor		–		3	–	4	–	2
North Carolina A&M		–		3	–	4	–	2
Maryland		–		3	–	5	–	2
Delaware		–		3	–	5	–	1
Florida Agricultural		–		1	–	2	–	1
Southwestern Louisiana Industrial		–		1	–	2	–	0
Columbian		–		1	–	3	–	0
Navy		–		2	–	7	–	1
TCU		–		0	–	5	–	1
Territorial Normal		–		0	–	1	–	0
Tusculum		–		0	–	1	–	0

The 1902 Georgetown Blue and Gray football team represented Georgetown University as an indepdennt during the 1902 college football season. Led by Billy Suter in his first and only season as head coach, Georgetown compiled a record of 7–3. Joe Reilly was the team's captain. The Blue and Gray played home games at Georgetown Field in Washington, D.C.

== Schedule ==
Date	Time	Opponent	Site	Result	Attendance	Source
September 27		Maryland	Georgetown Field; Washington, DC	W 27–0		
October 4		at Navy	Worden Field; Annapolis, MD	W 4–0		
October 11		St. John's (MD)	Georgetown Field; Washington, DC	W 18–0		
October 18		VMI	Georgetown Field; Washington, DC	W 23–11		
October 28		Lafayette	Georgetown Field; Washington, DC	L 0–23		
November 1		West Virginia	Georgetown Field; Washington, DC	W 5–0		
November 8	3:30 p.m.	VPI	Gibboney Field; Blacksburg, VA	L 0–28		
November 15		vs. North Carolina	Lafayette Field; Norfolk, VA	W 12–5		
November 22		Washington YMCA	Georgetown Field; Washington, DC	W 53–0		
November 27	2:30 p.m.	Carlisle	Georgetown Field; Washington, DC	L 0–21	3,500	
