= 1902 Maryland Aggies football team =

American college football season

1902 Maryland Aggies football
- Conference: Independent
- Record: 3–5–2
- Head coach: D. John Markey (1st season)
- Home stadium: Maryland Agricultural College Field

1902 Southern college football independents records
	Conf.			Overall
Team	W	L	T	W		L		T
Oklahoma A&M		–		1	–	0	–	0
Spring Hill		–		1	–	0	–	0
Texas A&M		–		7	–	0	–	2
Marshall		–		5	–	0	–	2
Virginia		–		8	–	1	–	1
South Carolina		–		6	–	1	–	0
Kentucky University		–		7	–	2	–	0
Howard (AL)		–		3	–	1	–	0
North Carolina		–		5	–	1	–	3
Georgetown		–		7	–	3	–	0
Arkansas		–		6	–	3	–	0
Oklahoma		–		6	–	3	–	0
Florida State College		–		2	–	1	–	0
Stetson		–		2	–	1	–	1
West Virginia		–		7	–	4	–	0
VPI		–		3	–	2	–	1
Davidson		–		4	–	4	–	1
East Florida Seminary		–		1	–	1	–	0
Kendall		–		1	–	1	–	0
Louisiana Industrial		–		1	–	1	–	1
Richmond		–		3	–	3	–	0
VMI		–		3	–	3	–	1
William & Mary		–		1	–	1	–	1
Baylor		–		3	–	4	–	2
North Carolina A&M		–		3	–	4	–	2
Maryland		–		3	–	5	–	2
Delaware		–		3	–	5	–	1
Florida Agricultural		–		1	–	2	–	1
Southwestern Louisiana Industrial		–		1	–	2	–	0
Columbian		–		1	–	3	–	0
Navy		–		2	–	7	–	1
TCU		–		0	–	5	–	1
Territorial Normal		–		0	–	1	–	0
Tusculum		–		0	–	1	–	0

The 1902 Maryland Aggies football team represented Maryland Agricultural College (later part of the University of Maryland) in the 1902 college football season. In their first season under head coach D. John Markey, the Aggies compiled a 3–5–2 record and were outscored by their opponents, 90 to 28. On October 22, 1902, the team secured its first victory in four years in an intercollegiate football game, defeating Columbian University (later known as George Washington University) by an 11–10 score.

== Schedule ==
Date	Opponent	Site	Result	Attendance	Source
September 27	at Georgetown	Georgetown Field; Washington, DC	L 0–27		
October 18	Mount Saint Joseph High School	College Park, MD	W 5–0		
October 22	Columbian	College Park, MD	W 11–10		
October 25	at Olympic Athletic Club	Washington, DC	W 6–0		
November 1	at Washington College (MD)	Chestertown, MD	T 0–0		
November 8	at Mount Saint Mary's	Emmitsburg, MD	L 0–5		
November 15	at Western Maryland	Westminster, MD	L 6–26		
November 19	University of Maryland, Baltimore	College Park, MD	L 0–5		
November 22	at Johns Hopkins	Baltimore, MD	L 0–17		
November 27	at Delaware	Newark, DE	T 0–0		
