= 1902 Arkansas Cardinals football team =

American college football season

1902 Arkansas Cardinals football
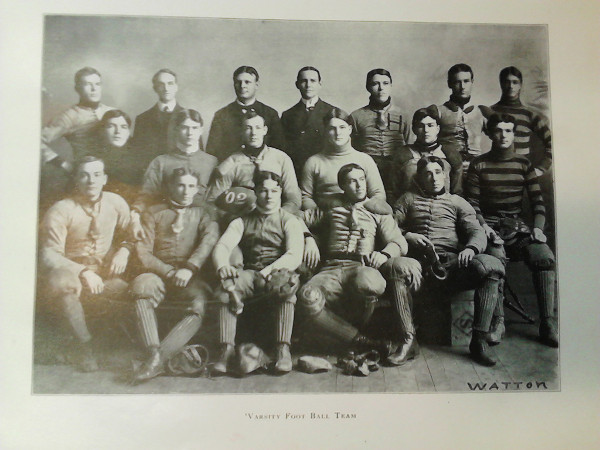
- Cardinals team photo 1902
- Conference: Independent
- Record: 6–3
- Head coach: Charles Thomas (2nd season)
- Captain: Lemuel Bryan
- Home stadium: The Hill

1902 Southern college football independents records
	Conf.			Overall
Team	W	L	T	W		L		T
Oklahoma A&M		–		1	–	0	–	0
Spring Hill		–		1	–	0	–	0
Texas A&M		–		7	–	0	–	2
Marshall		–		5	–	0	–	2
Virginia		–		8	–	1	–	1
South Carolina		–		6	–	1	–	0
Kentucky University		–		7	–	2	–	0
Howard (AL)		–		3	–	1	–	0
North Carolina		–		5	–	1	–	3
Georgetown		–		7	–	3	–	0
Arkansas		–		6	–	3	–	0
Oklahoma		–		6	–	3	–	0
Florida State College		–		2	–	1	–	0
Stetson		–		2	–	1	–	1
West Virginia		–		7	–	4	–	0
VPI		–		3	–	2	–	1
Davidson		–		4	–	4	–	1
East Florida Seminary		–		1	–	1	–	0
Kendall		–		1	–	1	–	0
Louisiana Industrial		–		1	–	1	–	1
Richmond		–		3	–	3	–	0
VMI		–		3	–	3	–	1
William & Mary		–		1	–	1	–	1
Baylor		–		3	–	4	–	2
North Carolina A&M		–		3	–	4	–	2
Maryland		–		3	–	5	–	2
Delaware		–		3	–	5	–	1
Florida Agricultural		–		1	–	2	–	1
Southwestern Louisiana Industrial		–		1	–	2	–	0
Columbian		–		1	–	3	–	0
Navy		–		2	–	7	–	1
TCU		–		0	–	5	–	1
Territorial Normal		–		0	–	1	–	0
Tusculum		–		0	–	1	–	0

The 1902 Arkansas Cardinals football team represented the University of Arkansas during the 1902 college football season. In their second season under head coach Charles Thomas, the Razorbacks compiled a 6–3 record and outscored their opponents by a combined total of 148 to 73.

== Schedule ==
Date	Opponent	Site	Result	Source
October 4	at Scarritt College	Neosho, MO	W 6–0	
October 11	at Kingfisher	Fair Grounds; Kingfisher, Oklahoma Territory	W 15–6	
October 13	at Oklahoma	University Campus; Norman, Oklahoma Territory	L 0–28	
October 22	Kendall	The Hill; Fayetteville, AR	W 33–0	
November 1	Cherokee Male Seminary	The Hill; Fayetteville, AR	W 50–0	
November 8	vs. Warrensburg Teachers	Joplin, MO	L 5–15	
November 10	at Pierce City College	Pierce City, MO	L 2–24	
November 15	Fort Scott High School	The Hill; Fayetteville, AR	W 16–0	
November 27	Missouri Mines	The Hill; Fayetteville, AR	W 11–0	
