= Mark McMahon (American football) =

American football player and coach (1878–1947)

Biographical details
- Born: May 16, 1878; Fannin County, Texas, U.S.
- Died: February 19, 1947 (aged 68); Fort Worth, Texas, U.S.

Playing career
- 1898–1901: Texas
- Position: Tackle

Coaching career (HC unless noted)
- 1902–1903: Oklahoma

Head coaching record
- Overall: 11–7–3

Mark M. McMahon (May 16, 1878 – February 19, 1947) was an American college football player and coach. He was the University of Oklahoma's fourth football coach.

McMahon went to school at Savoy College and then to the University of Texas, where he played for the Texas Varsity football team. He played on the 1900 Texas Varsity team that went undefeated and won the Champions of the Southwest title; and he was captain of the 1901 team.

He moved to Norman, Oklahoma and took the head football coaching job to help pay off student loans he had incurred as a law student at Texas. He coached the Rough Riders during the 1902 and 1903 seasons, leading the team to a combined record 11–7–3. McMahon is credited for introducing the first tackling dummy at Oklahoma. He also preferred long, hard schedules and because of that, the 1903 team played 10 of 12 games on the road. In his first game as head coach, Oklahoma won 62-0 setting a scoring record for an Oklahoma coach's debut that would last almost 90 years.

After repaying his law school debts, McMahon practiced law, starting in Durant, Oklahoma in the winter of 1903, then later in Bonham, Texas where he started a firm and then in Fort Worth, Texas.

== Head coaching record ==
Year	Team	Overall	Bowl/playoffs
Oklahoma Sooners (Independent) (1902–1903)
1902	Oklahoma	6–3	
1903	Oklahoma	5–4–3	
Oklahoma:		11–7–3	
Total:		11–7–3	
