= 1902 Florida Agricultural College football team =

College football season

1902 Florida Agricultural College football
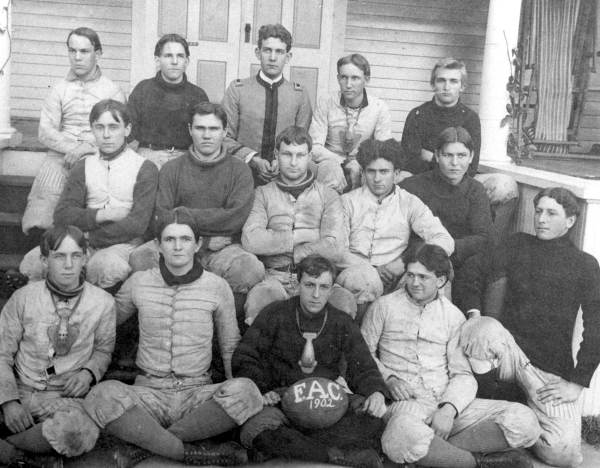
- Conference: Independent
- Record: 1–3–1
- Head coach: James M. Farr (2nd season)

1902 Southern college football independents records
	Conf.			Overall
Team	W	L	T	W		L		T
Oklahoma A&M		–		1	–	0	–	0
Spring Hill		–		1	–	0	–	0
Texas A&M		–		7	–	0	–	2
Marshall		–		5	–	0	–	2
Virginia		–		8	–	1	–	1
South Carolina		–		6	–	1	–	0
Kentucky University		–		7	–	2	–	0
Howard (AL)		–		3	–	1	–	0
North Carolina		–		5	–	1	–	3
Georgetown		–		7	–	3	–	0
Arkansas		–		6	–	3	–	0
Oklahoma		–		6	–	3	–	0
Florida State College		–		2	–	1	–	0
Stetson		–		2	–	1	–	1
West Virginia		–		7	–	4	–	0
VPI		–		3	–	2	–	1
Davidson		–		4	–	4	–	1
East Florida Seminary		–		1	–	1	–	0
Kendall		–		1	–	1	–	0
Louisiana Industrial		–		1	–	1	–	1
Richmond		–		3	–	3	–	0
VMI		–		3	–	3	–	1
William & Mary		–		1	–	1	–	1
Baylor		–		3	–	4	–	2
North Carolina A&M		–		3	–	4	–	2
Maryland		–		3	–	5	–	2
Delaware		–		3	–	5	–	1
Florida Agricultural		–		1	–	2	–	1
Southwestern Louisiana Industrial		–		1	–	2	–	0
Columbian		–		1	–	3	–	0
Navy		–		2	–	7	–	1
TCU		–		0	–	5	–	1
Territorial Normal		–		0	–	1	–	0
Tusculum		–		0	–	1	–	0

The 1902 Florida Agricultural College football team represented the Florida Agricultural College in the sport of American football during the 1902 college football season. This was not the modern Florida Gators of the University of Florida in Gainesville, which begins in 1906, but one of its four predecessor institutions.

== Schedule ==
Date	Time	Opponent	Site	Result	Source
		East Florida Seminary		L 0–11 (Note: The team played East Florida Seminary in one or more games during the 1902 season, but the only thing known is the total score of the entire series.)	
November 14		Stetson	Lake City, FL	T 0–0	
November 22		at Stetson	DeLand, FL	L 5–22	
December 12		at Florida State College	Tallahassee, FL	L 0–6	
December 20	3:00 p.m.	Florida State College	Baseball Park; Lake City, FL	W 6–0	
