= 1902 North Carolina A&M Aggies football team =

American college football season

1902 North Carolina A&M Aggies football
- Conference: Independent
- Record: 3–4–2
- Head coach: Art Devlin (1st season)

1902 Southern college football independents records
	Conf.			Overall
Team	W	L	T	W		L		T
Oklahoma A&M		–		1	–	0	–	0
Spring Hill		–		1	–	0	–	0
Texas A&M		–		7	–	0	–	2
Marshall		–		5	–	0	–	2
Virginia		–		8	–	1	–	1
South Carolina		–		6	–	1	–	0
Kentucky University		–		7	–	2	–	0
Howard (AL)		–		3	–	1	–	0
North Carolina		–		5	–	1	–	3
Georgetown		–		7	–	3	–	0
Arkansas		–		6	–	3	–	0
Oklahoma		–		6	–	3	–	0
Florida State College		–		2	–	1	–	0
Stetson		–		2	–	1	–	1
West Virginia		–		7	–	4	–	0
VPI		–		3	–	2	–	1
Davidson		–		4	–	4	–	1
East Florida Seminary		–		1	–	1	–	0
Kendall		–		1	–	1	–	0
Louisiana Industrial		–		1	–	1	–	1
Richmond		–		3	–	3	–	0
VMI		–		3	–	3	–	1
William & Mary		–		1	–	1	–	1
Baylor		–		3	–	4	–	2
North Carolina A&M		–		3	–	4	–	2
Maryland		–		3	–	5	–	2
Delaware		–		3	–	5	–	1
Florida Agricultural		–		1	–	2	–	1
Southwestern Louisiana Industrial		–		1	–	2	–	0
Columbian		–		1	–	3	–	0
Navy		–		2	–	7	–	1
TCU		–		0	–	5	–	1
Territorial Normal		–		0	–	1	–	0
Tusculum		–		0	–	1	–	0

The 1902 North Carolina A&M Aggies football team represented the North Carolina A&M Aggies of North Carolina College of Agriculture and Mechanic Arts (now known as North Carolina State University) during the 1902 college football season. In Art Devlin's first season as head coach, the Aggies improved to a 3–4–2 record, outscoring their opponents 91 to 41.

== Schedule ==
Date	Opponent	Site	Result	Source
October 4	at Clemson	Bowman Field; Clemson, SC (rivalry)	L 5–11	
October 6	at Furman	University Grounds; Greenville, SC	T 0–0	
October 13	Furman	State Fairgrounds; Raleigh, NC	L 2–5	
October 18	at VPI	Gibboney Field; Blacksburg, VA	L 6–10	
October 20	vs. St. Albans	Roanoke, VA	W 10–0	
October 31	Guilford	State Fairgrounds; Raleigh, NC	W 28–5	
November 8	North Carolina	State Fairgrounds; Raleigh, NC (rivalry)	T 0–0	
November 21	vs. Davidson	Greensboro, NC	L 0–5	
November 27	Richmond	Raleigh, NC	W 30–5	
