= 1902 Kentucky University football team =

American college football season

1902 Kentucky University football
- Conference: Independent
- Record: 7–2
- Head coach: None

1902 Southern college football independents records
	Conf.			Overall
Team	W	L	T	W		L		T
Oklahoma A&M		–		1	–	0	–	0
Spring Hill		–		1	–	0	–	0
Texas A&M		–		7	–	0	–	2
Marshall		–		5	–	0	–	2
Virginia		–		8	–	1	–	1
South Carolina		–		6	–	1	–	0
Kentucky University		–		7	–	2	–	0
Howard (AL)		–		3	–	1	–	0
North Carolina		–		5	–	1	–	3
Georgetown		–		7	–	3	–	0
Arkansas		–		6	–	3	–	0
Oklahoma		–		6	–	3	–	0
Florida State College		–		2	–	1	–	0
Stetson		–		2	–	1	–	1
West Virginia		–		7	–	4	–	0
VPI		–		3	–	2	–	1
Davidson		–		4	–	4	–	1
East Florida Seminary		–		1	–	1	–	0
Kendall		–		1	–	1	–	0
Louisiana Industrial		–		1	–	1	–	1
Richmond		–		3	–	3	–	0
VMI		–		3	–	3	–	1
William & Mary		–		1	–	1	–	1
Baylor		–		3	–	4	–	2
North Carolina A&M		–		3	–	4	–	2
Maryland		–		3	–	5	–	2
Delaware		–		3	–	5	–	1
Florida Agricultural		–		1	–	2	–	1
Southwestern Louisiana Industrial		–		1	–	2	–	0
Columbian		–		1	–	3	–	0
Navy		–		2	–	7	–	1
TCU		–		0	–	5	–	1
Territorial Normal		–		0	–	1	–	0
Tusculum		–		0	–	1	–	0

The 1902 Kentucky University Pioneers football team was an American football team that represented Kentucky University, now known as Transylvania University, during the 1902 college football season. Hogan Yancey was on the team.

== Schedule ==
Date	Opponent	Site	Result	Attendance	Source
September 20	Kentucky Military Institute	Fourth Street Field; Lexington, KY	W 28–0		
October 2	at St. Xavier	Cincinnati, OH	W 5–0		
October 11	Nashville	Fourth Street Field; Lexington, KY	W 17–0	400	
October 20	Virginia	Fourth Street Field; Lexington, KY	L 0–12		
October 25	Georgetown (KY)	Fourth Street Field; Lexington, KY	W 70–0		
November 1	at Berea	Berea, KY	W 62–0		
November 8	at Vanderbilt	Dudley Field; Nashville, TN	L 5–16		
November 15	at Indianapolis	Washington Park; Indianapolis, IN	W 56–0		
November 27	Kentucky State College	Lexington, KY	W 6–5		
