= 1902 Marshall Thundering Herd football team =

American college football season

1902 Marshall Thundering Herd football
- Conference: Independent
- Record: 5–0–2
- Head coach: None
- Home stadium: Central Field

1902 Southern college football independents records
	Conf.			Overall
Team	W	L	T	W		L		T
Oklahoma A&M		–		1	–	0	–	0
Spring Hill		–		1	–	0	–	0
Texas A&M		–		7	–	0	–	2
Marshall		–		5	–	0	–	2
Virginia		–		8	–	1	–	1
South Carolina		–		6	–	1	–	0
Kentucky University		–		7	–	2	–	0
Howard (AL)		–		3	–	1	–	0
North Carolina		–		5	–	1	–	3
Georgetown		–		7	–	3	–	0
Arkansas		–		6	–	3	–	0
Oklahoma		–		6	–	3	–	0
Stetson		–		2	–	1	–	1
East Florida Seminary		–		2	–	1	–	0
Florida State College		–		2	–	1	–	0
West Virginia		–		7	–	4	–	0
VPI		–		3	–	2	–	1
Davidson		–		4	–	4	–	1
Kendall		–		1	–	1	–	0
Louisiana Industrial		–		1	–	1	–	1
Richmond		–		3	–	3	–	0
VMI		–		3	–	3	–	1
William & Mary		–		1	–	1	–	1
Baylor		–		3	–	4	–	2
North Carolina A&M		–		3	–	4	–	2
Maryland		–		3	–	5	–	2
Delaware		–		3	–	5	–	1
Southwestern Louisiana Industrial		–		1	–	2	–	0
Florida Agricultural		–		1	–	3	–	1
Columbian		–		1	–	3	–	0
Navy		–		2	–	7	–	1
TCU		–		0	–	5	–	1
Territorial Normal		–		0	–	1	–	0
Tusculum		–		0	–	1	–	0

The 1902 Marshall Thundering Herd football team represented Marshall College (now Marshall University) as an independent during the 1902 college football season. The team did not have a coach, and outscored their opponents 65–2 in seven games.

The 1902 season marked the fourth undefeated season in a row for Marshall.

== Schedule ==
Date	Opponent	Site	Result
October 10	Huntington HS	Central Field; Huntington, WV	W 5–2
October 17	Ashland HS	Central Field; Huntington, WV	T 0–0
October 24	Gallipolis HS	Central Field; Huntington, WV	W 34–0
November 1	vs. Ashland HS	Catlettsburg, KY	W 16–0
November 8	at Charleston HS	Charleston, WV	W 5–0
November 14	Charleston HS^{†}	Central Field; Huntington, WV	T 0–0
November 27	at Middleport HS	Middleport, OH	W 5–0
^{†}Homecoming
