= 1902 East Florida Seminary football team =

College football team

1902 East Florida Seminary football
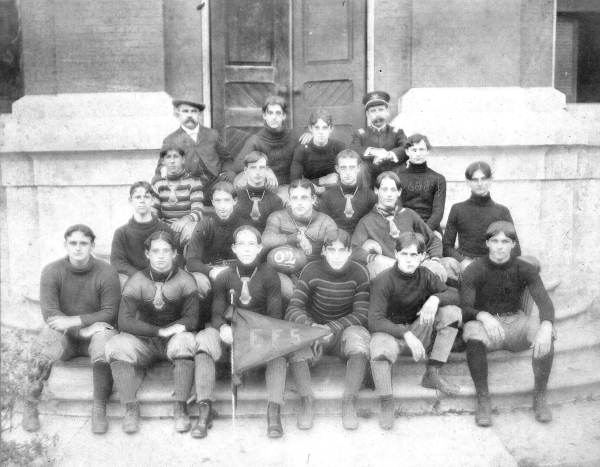

State champion
- Conference: Independent
- Record: 2–1
- Home stadium: The Ballpark

1902 Southern college football independents records
	Conf.			Overall
Team	W	L	T	W		L		T
Oklahoma A&M		–		1	–	0	–	0
Spring Hill		–		1	–	0	–	0
Texas A&M		–		7	–	0	–	2
Marshall		–		5	–	0	–	2
Virginia		–		8	–	1	–	1
South Carolina		–		6	–	1	–	0
Kentucky University		–		7	–	2	–	0
Howard (AL)		–		3	–	1	–	0
North Carolina		–		5	–	1	–	3
Georgetown		–		7	–	3	–	0
Arkansas		–		6	–	3	–	0
Oklahoma		–		6	–	3	–	0
Florida State College		–		2	–	1	–	0
Stetson		–		2	–	1	–	1
West Virginia		–		7	–	4	–	0
VPI		–		3	–	2	–	1
Davidson		–		4	–	4	–	1
East Florida Seminary		–		1	–	1	–	0
Kendall		–		1	–	1	–	0
Louisiana Industrial		–		1	–	1	–	1
Richmond		–		3	–	3	–	0
VMI		–		3	–	3	–	1
William & Mary		–		1	–	1	–	1
Baylor		–		3	–	4	–	2
North Carolina A&M		–		3	–	4	–	2
Maryland		–		3	–	5	–	2
Delaware		–		3	–	5	–	1
Florida Agricultural		–		1	–	2	–	1
Southwestern Louisiana Industrial		–		1	–	2	–	0
Columbian		–		1	–	3	–	0
Navy		–		2	–	7	–	1
TCU		–		0	–	5	–	1
Territorial Normal		–		0	–	1	–	0
Tusculum		–		0	–	1	–	0

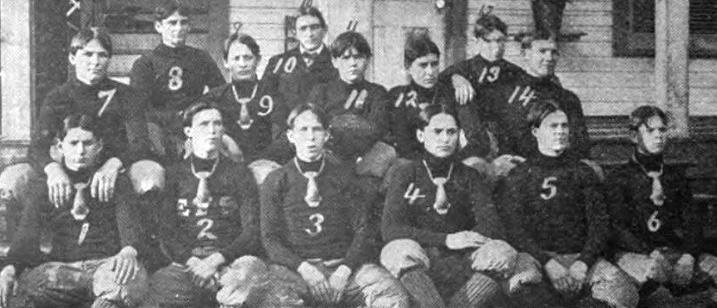
Picture in Spalding's Football Guide

The 1902 East Florida Seminary football team represented the East Florida Seminary in Gainesville, Florida in the sport of American football during the 1902 college football season.

The season consisted of a two-game series with Stetson, which had fielded one of the first intercollegiate football teams in Florida the previous year. The teams split the games, but the East Florida Seminary claimed a state championship because they scored more points in the series.

== Background ==
The school had been established in 1853 and moved to Gainesville in 1866.

Football squads from the East Florida Seminary played a limited slate of games starting in 1902 until 1904. In 1905, the school was consolidated along with Florida Agricultural College in Ocala along with two smaller schools to form the modern University of Florida per the Buckman Act. The new institution established its own football program in 1906, and the university does not include games played by its various predecessor institutions in its athletic records.

== Schedule ==
Their known schedule is as follows:

Date	Opponent	Site	Result	Source
	Florida Agricultural		W 11–0 (Note: The team played Florida Agricultural in one or more games during the 1902 season, but the only thing known is the total score of the entire series.)	
November 22	Stetson	Gainesville, FL	W 11–6	
December 6	at Stetson	DeLand, FL	L 0–2	
