= 1902 Florida State College football team =

American college football season

1902 Florida State College football
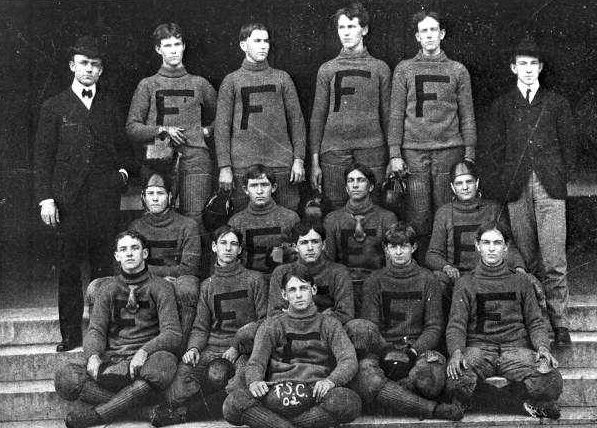
- Conference: Independent
- Record: 2–1
- Head coach: W. W. Hughes (1st season)
- Captain: A. B. Clark

1902 Southern college football independents records
| | Conf. | | | Overall |
| Team | W | L | T | W | | L | | T |
|---|---|---|---|---|---|---|---|---|
| Oklahoma A&M | | – | | 1 | – | 0 | – | 0 |
| Spring Hill | | – | | 1 | – | 0 | – | 0 |
| Texas A&M | | – | | 7 | – | 0 | – | 2 |
| Marshall | | – | | 5 | – | 0 | – | 2 |
| Virginia | | – | | 8 | – | 1 | – | 1 |
| South Carolina | | – | | 6 | – | 1 | – | 0 |
| Kentucky University | | – | | 7 | – | 2 | – | 0 |
| Howard (AL) | | – | | 3 | – | 1 | – | 0 |
| North Carolina | | – | | 5 | – | 1 | – | 3 |
| Georgetown | | – | | 7 | – | 3 | – | 0 |
| Arkansas | | – | | 6 | – | 3 | – | 0 |
| Oklahoma | | – | | 6 | – | 3 | – | 0 |
| Florida State College | | – | | 2 | – | 1 | – | 0 |
| Stetson | | – | | 2 | – | 1 | – | 1 |
| West Virginia | | – | | 7 | – | 4 | – | 0 |
| VPI | | – | | 3 | – | 2 | – | 1 |
| Davidson | | – | | 4 | – | 4 | – | 1 |
| East Florida Seminary | | – | | 1 | – | 1 | – | 0 |
| Kendall | | – | | 1 | – | 1 | – | 0 |
| Louisiana Industrial | | – | | 1 | – | 1 | – | 1 |
| Richmond | | – | | 3 | – | 3 | – | 0 |
| VMI | | – | | 3 | – | 3 | – | 1 |
| William & Mary | | – | | 1 | – | 1 | – | 1 |
| Baylor | | – | | 3 | – | 4 | – | 2 |
| North Carolina A&M | | – | | 3 | – | 4 | – | 2 |
| Maryland | | – | | 3 | – | 5 | – | 2 |
| Delaware | | – | | 3 | – | 5 | – | 1 |
| Florida Agricultural | | – | | 1 | – | 2 | – | 1 |
| Southwestern Louisiana Industrial | | – | | 1 | – | 2 | – | 0 |
| Columbian | | – | | 1 | – | 3 | – | 0 |
| Navy | | – | | 2 | – | 7 | – | 1 |
| TCU | | – | | 0 | – | 5 | – | 1 |
| Territorial Normal | | – | | 0 | – | 1 | – | 0 |
| Tusculum | | – | | 0 | – | 1 | – | 0 |

The 1902 Florida State College football team represented Florida State College in the sport of American football during the 1902 college football season. The team was the first intercollegiate football squad to represent Florida State University and was led by head coach W. W. Hughes. The team posted a 2–1 record and won the State Championship.

== Schedule ==
| Date | Time | Opponent | Site | Result | Source |
|---|---|---|---|---|---|
| November 21 | | at Bainbridge Giants | Bainbridge, GA | W 5–0 | |
| December 12 | | Florida Agricultural | Tallahassee, FL | W 6–0 | |
| December 20 | 3:00 p.m. | at Florida Agricultural | Baseball Park; Lake City, FL | L 0–6 | |

== Roster ==
The original line-up played the entire game, both offense and defense. Substitutes replaced injured players.

=== Line ===
- LE - L.M. Murray
- LT – E.P. Watson
- LG – W. Mullin
- C – C.W. Peters
- RG – G.P. McCord
- RT – W.W. Dickey
- RE - R.F. Bradford

=== Backfield ===
- QB – A.B. Clark
- LH - Dan Williams
- RH - W.H. Provence
- FB – Fritz Buchholz
