= 1902 Navy Midshipmen football team =

American college football season

1902 Navy Midshipmen football
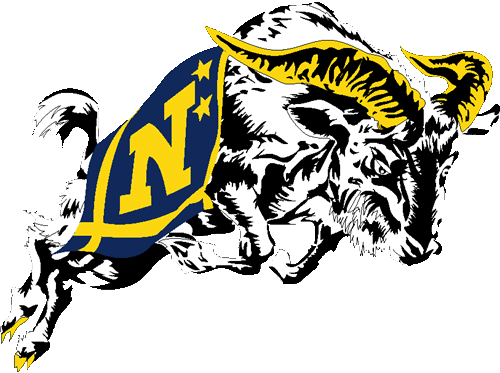
- Conference: Independent
- Record: 2–7–1
- Head coach: Art Hillebrand (2nd season)
- Captain: Charles Belknap
- Home stadium: Worden Field

1902 Southern college football independents records
	Conf.			Overall
Team	W	L	T	W		L		T
Oklahoma A&M		–		1	–	0	–	0
Spring Hill		–		1	–	0	–	0
Texas A&M		–		7	–	0	–	2
Marshall		–		5	–	0	–	2
Virginia		–		8	–	1	–	1
South Carolina		–		6	–	1	–	0
Kentucky University		–		7	–	2	–	0
Howard (AL)		–		3	–	1	–	0
North Carolina		–		5	–	1	–	3
Georgetown		–		7	–	3	–	0
Arkansas		–		6	–	3	–	0
Oklahoma		–		6	–	3	–	0
Florida State College		–		2	–	1	–	0
Stetson		–		2	–	1	–	1
West Virginia		–		7	–	4	–	0
VPI		–		3	–	2	–	1
Davidson		–		4	–	4	–	1
East Florida Seminary		–		1	–	1	–	0
Kendall		–		1	–	1	–	0
Louisiana Industrial		–		1	–	1	–	1
Richmond		–		3	–	3	–	0
VMI		–		3	–	3	–	1
William & Mary		–		1	–	1	–	1
Baylor		–		3	–	4	–	2
North Carolina A&M		–		3	–	4	–	2
Maryland		–		3	–	5	–	2
Delaware		–		3	–	5	–	1
Florida Agricultural		–		1	–	2	–	1
Southwestern Louisiana Industrial		–		1	–	2	–	0
Columbian		–		1	–	3	–	0
Navy		–		2	–	7	–	1
TCU		–		0	–	5	–	1
Territorial Normal		–		0	–	1	–	0
Tusculum		–		0	–	1	–	0

The 1902 Navy Midshipmen football team represented the United States Naval Academy during the 1902 college football season. In their second season under head coach Art Hillebrand, the Midshipmen compiled a 2–7–1 record and were outscored by opponents by a combined score of 99 to 35.

== Schedule ==
Date	Opponent	Site	Result	Attendance	Source
October 4	Georgetown	Worden Field; Annapolis, MD	L 0–4		
October 11	Princeton	Worden Field; Annapolis, MD	L 0–11		
October 18	Lehigh	Worden Field; Annapolis, MD	T 5–5	2,500	
October 22	Penn	Worden Field; Annapolis, MD	W 10–6		
October 25	Dickinson	Worden Field; Annapolis, MD	L 0–6		
November 1	Penn State	Worden Field; Annapolis, MD	L 0–6		
November 8	Lafayette	Worden Field; Annapolis, MD	W 12–11		
November 15	Bucknell	Worden Field; Annapolis, MD	L 0–23		
November 19	Columbia	Worden Field; Annapolis, MD	L 0–5		
November 29	vs. Army	Franklin Field; Philadelphia, PA (Army–Navy Game)	L 8–22		
