= 1902 Delaware football team =

American college football season

1902 Delaware football
- Conference: Independent
- Record: 3–5–1
- Head coach: Clarence A. Short (1st season)

1902 Southern college football independents records
	Conf.			Overall
Team	W	L	T	W		L		T
Oklahoma A&M		–		1	–	0	–	0
Spring Hill		–		1	–	0	–	0
Texas A&M		–		7	–	0	–	2
Marshall		–		5	–	0	–	2
Virginia		–		8	–	1	–	1
South Carolina		–		6	–	1	–	0
Kentucky University		–		7	–	2	–	0
Howard (AL)		–		3	–	1	–	0
North Carolina		–		5	–	1	–	3
Georgetown		–		7	–	3	–	0
Arkansas		–		6	–	3	–	0
Oklahoma		–		6	–	3	–	0
Florida State College		–		2	–	1	–	0
Stetson		–		2	–	1	–	1
West Virginia		–		7	–	4	–	0
VPI		–		3	–	2	–	1
Davidson		–		4	–	4	–	1
East Florida Seminary		–		1	–	1	–	0
Kendall		–		1	–	1	–	0
Louisiana Industrial		–		1	–	1	–	1
Richmond		–		3	–	3	–	0
VMI		–		3	–	3	–	1
William & Mary		–		1	–	1	–	1
Baylor		–		3	–	4	–	2
North Carolina A&M		–		3	–	4	–	2
Maryland		–		3	–	5	–	2
Delaware		–		3	–	5	–	1
Florida Agricultural		–		1	–	2	–	1
Southwestern Louisiana Industrial		–		1	–	2	–	0
Columbian		–		1	–	3	–	0
Navy		–		2	–	7	–	1
TCU		–		0	–	5	–	1
Territorial Normal		–		0	–	1	–	0
Tusculum		–		0	–	1	–	0

The 1902 Delaware football team represented Delaware College—now known as the University of Delaware–as an independent during the 1902 college football season. Led by first-year head coach Clarence A. Short, Delaware compiled a record of 3–5–1.

== Schedule ==
Date	Opponent	Site	Result	Source
October 4	at Swarthmore	Whittier Field; Swarthmore, PA	L 0–12	
October 11	Washington College	Newark, DE	W 27–0	
October 18	at Haverford	Haverford, PA	L 0–41	
October 25	University of Maryland, Baltimore	Newark, DE	W 6–0	
November 1	at Fordham		W 17–10	
November 8	at St. John's (MD)	Annapolis, MD	L 0–10	
November 15	Rutgers	Neilson Field; New Brunswick, NJ	L 12–15	
November 19	at Pennsylvania Military	Chester, PA	L 12–17	
November 27	Maryland	Newark, DE	T 0–0	
