= Frank Singleton (American football) =

American football coach

Biographical details
- Born: August 29, 1887; Mississippi, U.S.
- Died: August 11, 1935 (aged 47); Fort Worth, Texas, U.S.

Coaching career (HC unless noted)
- 1902: Louisiana Industrial

Head coaching record
- Overall: 1–1–1

Frank Edis Singleton (August 29, 1887 – August 11, 1935) was an American college football coach. He was the head football coach at Louisiana Tech University, then known as Louisiana Industrial Institute, in 1902, compiling a record of 1–1–1.

== Head coaching record ==
Year	Team	Overall	Conference	Standing	Bowl/playoffs
Louisiana Industrial (Independent) (1902)
1902	Louisiana Industrial	1–1–1			
Louisiana Industrial:		1–1–1			
Total:		1–1–1			
