= 1902 Richmond Spiders football team =

American college football season

1902 Richmond Spiders football
- Conference: Independent
- Record: 3–3
- Head coach: Graham Hobson (1st season)
- Captain: Menalcus Lankford
- Home stadium: Broad Street Park

1902 Southern college football independents records
	Conf.			Overall
Team	W	L	T	W		L		T
Oklahoma A&M		–		1	–	0	–	0
Spring Hill		–		1	–	0	–	0
Texas A&M		–		7	–	0	–	2
Marshall		–		5	–	0	–	2
Virginia		–		8	–	1	–	1
South Carolina		–		6	–	1	–	0
Kentucky University		–		7	–	2	–	0
Howard (AL)		–		3	–	1	–	0
North Carolina		–		5	–	1	–	3
Georgetown		–		7	–	3	–	0
Arkansas		–		6	–	3	–	0
Oklahoma		–		6	–	3	–	0
Florida State College		–		2	–	1	–	0
Stetson		–		2	–	1	–	1
West Virginia		–		7	–	4	–	0
VPI		–		3	–	2	–	1
Davidson		–		4	–	4	–	1
East Florida Seminary		–		1	–	1	–	0
Kendall		–		1	–	1	–	0
Louisiana Industrial		–		1	–	1	–	1
Richmond		–		3	–	3	–	0
VMI		–		3	–	3	–	1
William & Mary		–		1	–	1	–	1
Baylor		–		3	–	4	–	2
North Carolina A&M		–		3	–	4	–	2
Maryland		–		3	–	5	–	2
Delaware		–		3	–	5	–	1
Florida Agricultural		–		1	–	2	–	1
Southwestern Louisiana Industrial		–		1	–	2	–	0
Columbian		–		1	–	3	–	0
Navy		–		2	–	7	–	1
TCU		–		0	–	5	–	1
Territorial Normal		–		0	–	1	–	0
Tusculum		–		0	–	1	–	0

The 1902 Richmond Spiders football team was an American football team that represented Richmond College—now known as the University of Richmond—as an independent during the 1902 college football season. Led by Graham Hobson in his first and only year as head coach, Richmond compiled a record of 3–3.

== Schedule ==
Date	Time	Opponent	Site	Result	Attendance	Source
October 18	2:30 p.m.	Randolph–Macon	Broad Street Park; Richmond, VA	W 30–0	600–1,500	
October 25		at VMI	Lexington, VA	L 0–33		
October 27		at Washington and Lee	Lexington, VA	L 0–29		
November 8	3:45 p.m.	Hoge Memorial Military Academy	Broad Street Park; Richmond, VA	W 59–0		
November 15		Hampden–Sydney	Broad Street Park; Richmond, VA	W 23–11	1,000	
November 27		at North Carolina A&M	Raleigh, NC	L 5–30		
