= 1902 West Virginia Mountaineers football team =

American college football season

1902 West Virginia Mountaineers football
- Conference: Independent
- Record: 7–4
- Head coach: Harold J. Davall (1st season)
- Captain: Lewis O. Smith

1902 Southern college football independents records
	Conf.			Overall
Team	W	L	T	W		L		T
Oklahoma A&M		–		1	–	0	–	0
Spring Hill		–		1	–	0	–	0
Texas A&M		–		7	–	0	–	2
Marshall		–		5	–	0	–	2
Virginia		–		8	–	1	–	1
South Carolina		–		6	–	1	–	0
Kentucky University		–		7	–	2	–	0
Howard (AL)		–		3	–	1	–	0
North Carolina		–		5	–	1	–	3
Georgetown		–		7	–	3	–	0
Arkansas		–		6	–	3	–	0
Oklahoma		–		6	–	3	–	0
Stetson		–		2	–	1	–	1
East Florida Seminary		–		2	–	1	–	0
Florida State College		–		2	–	1	–	0
West Virginia		–		7	–	4	–	0
VPI		–		3	–	2	–	1
Davidson		–		4	–	4	–	1
Kendall		–		1	–	1	–	0
Louisiana Industrial		–		1	–	1	–	1
Richmond		–		3	–	3	–	0
VMI		–		3	–	3	–	1
William & Mary		–		1	–	1	–	1
Baylor		–		3	–	4	–	2
North Carolina A&M		–		3	–	4	–	2
Maryland		–		3	–	5	–	2
Delaware		–		3	–	5	–	1
Southwestern Louisiana Industrial		–		1	–	2	–	0
Florida Agricultural		–		1	–	3	–	1
Columbian		–		1	–	3	–	0
Navy		–		2	–	7	–	1
TCU		–		0	–	5	–	1
Territorial Normal		–		0	–	1	–	0
Tusculum		–		0	–	1	–	0

The 1902 West Virginia Mountaineers football team was an American football team that represented West Virginia University as an independent during the 1902 college football season. In its first and only season under head coach Harold J. Davall, the team compiled a 7–4 record and outscored opponents by a total of 219 to 87. Lewis O. Smith was the team captain.

== Schedule ==
Date	Opponent	Site	Result	Source
September 27	Alumni and All-Stars	Morgantown, WV	W 11–6	
October 4	Westminster (PA)	Morgantown, WV	W 25–0	
October 11	at Ohio State	Columbus, OH	L 0–30	
October 18	Alumni and All-Stars	Morgantown, WV	L 0–6	
October 22	at Western University of Pennsylvania	Colosseum; Pittsburgh, PA (rivalry)	W 23–6	
October 24	at Marietta	Marietta, OH	W 12–6	
November 1	at Georgetown	Georgetown Field; Washington, DC	L 0–5	
November 15	Grove City	Morgantown, WV	W 53–0	
November 19	at Washington & Jefferson	College Park; Washington, PA	L 0–23	
November 22	vs. Washington and Lee	Charleston, WV	W 17–5	
November 27	West Virginia Wesleyan	Morgantown, WV	W 78–0	
