= 1902 Columbian Orange and Blue football team =

American college football season

1902 Columbian Orange and Blue football
- Conference: Independent
- Record: 1–3
- Head coach: Graham Nichols (4th season)

1902 Southern college football independents records
	Conf.			Overall
Team	W	L	T	W		L		T
Oklahoma A&M		–		1	–	0	–	0
Spring Hill		–		1	–	0	–	0
Texas A&M		–		7	–	0	–	2
Marshall		–		5	–	0	–	2
Virginia		–		8	–	1	–	1
South Carolina		–		6	–	1	–	0
Kentucky University		–		7	–	2	–	0
Howard (AL)		–		3	–	1	–	0
North Carolina		–		5	–	1	–	3
Georgetown		–		7	–	3	–	0
Arkansas		–		6	–	3	–	0
Oklahoma		–		6	–	3	–	0
Florida State College		–		2	–	1	–	0
Stetson		–		2	–	1	–	1
West Virginia		–		7	–	4	–	0
VPI		–		3	–	2	–	1
Davidson		–		4	–	4	–	1
East Florida Seminary		–		1	–	1	–	0
Kendall		–		1	–	1	–	0
Louisiana Industrial		–		1	–	1	–	1
Richmond		–		3	–	3	–	0
VMI		–		3	–	3	–	1
William & Mary		–		1	–	1	–	1
Baylor		–		3	–	4	–	2
North Carolina A&M		–		3	–	4	–	2
Maryland		–		3	–	5	–	2
Delaware		–		3	–	5	–	1
Florida Agricultural		–		1	–	2	–	1
Southwestern Louisiana Industrial		–		1	–	2	–	0
Columbian		–		1	–	3	–	0
Navy		–		2	–	7	–	1
TCU		–		0	–	5	–	1
Territorial Normal		–		0	–	1	–	0
Tusculum		–		0	–	1	–	0

The 1902 Columbian Orange and Blue football team was an American football team that represented Columbian University (now known as George Washington University) as an independent during the 1902 college football season. In their fourth season under head coach Graham Nichols, the team compiled a 1–3 record.

== Schedule ==
Date	Opponent	Site	Result	Source
September 27	Western Maryland	YMCA Field; Washington, DC	W 5–0	
October 4	at St. John's (MD)	Annapolis, MD	L 0–10	
October 18	Franklin & Marshall	National Park; Washington, DC	L 0–36	
October 22	at Maryland	College Park, MD	L 11–10	
November 15	at Washington and Lee	Lexington, VA	No contest	
November 17	at VMI	Lexington, VA	No contest	
