= R. R. Brown =

American sports coach (1879–1950)

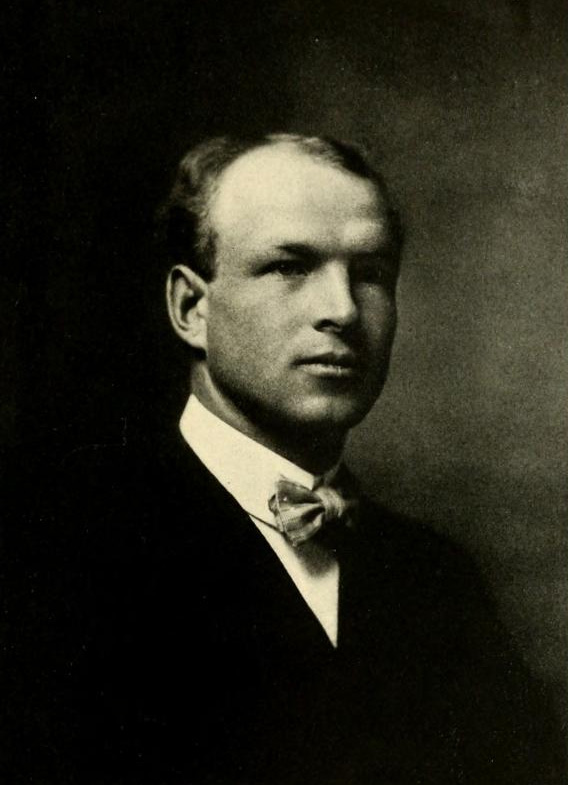
- Brown pictured in The Calyx 1908, Washington and Lee yearbook

Biographical details
- Born: November 28, 1879; Joliet, Illinois, U.S.
- Died: December 24, 1950 (aged 71); Roswell, New Mexico, U.S.

Playing career
- 1901: Dartmouth
- Positions: Fullback, halfback

Coaching career (HC unless noted)

Football
- 1902: VPI
- 1903: VPI (assistant)
- 1904: North Carolina
- 1905–1908: Washington and Lee
- 1909: Tulane
- 1910–1922: New Mexico Military
- 1923–1925: New Mexico A&M

Basketball
- 1922–1926: New Mexico A&M

Baseball
- 1904: VPI
- 1906–1910: Washington and Lee

Administrative career (AD unless noted)
- 1923–1927: New Mexico A&M

Head coaching record
- Overall: 52–20–9 (football); 48–31 (basketball); 45–34–3 (baseball, excluding 1906 season)
- Bowls: 0–1

Robert Roswell "Buster" Brown (November 28, 1879 – December 24, 1950) was an American football player, coach of football, basketball, and baseball, and college athletics administrator. After playing college football at Dartmouth College, he coached football teams at Virginia Tech, North Carolina, Washington and Lee, and Tulane. In 1910, he moved to Roswell, New Mexico, where he served for more than 25 years as the football coach and athletic director at the New Mexico Military Institute.

== Athlete ==
Brown was born on November 28, 1879, in Joliet, Illinois. He attended high school in Elgin, Illinois, graduating in 1898. He played football and baseball in high school and also competed for the Elgin Athletic Club football team in 1898 and 1899. In 1900, he enrolled at Dartmouth College where he played football for the Dartmouth Big Green football team as a halfback and fullback. He attended Dartmouth from 1900 to 1903.

== College coach ==
=== Early years ===
Brown served as the head football coach at Virginia Agricultural and Mechanical College and Polytechnic Institute—now Virginia Polytechnic Institute and State University—in 1902, at University of North Carolina at Chapel Hill in 1904, and Washington and Lee University from 1905 to 1908. In 1909, he was head football coach at Tulane University, which he led to a 4–3–2 record. Brown was also the head baseball coach at Virginia Tech in 1904.

In 1905, Brown accepted a position as the athletic director and coach at Washington and Lee. He remained at Washington and Lee until 1910.

=== New Mexico ===
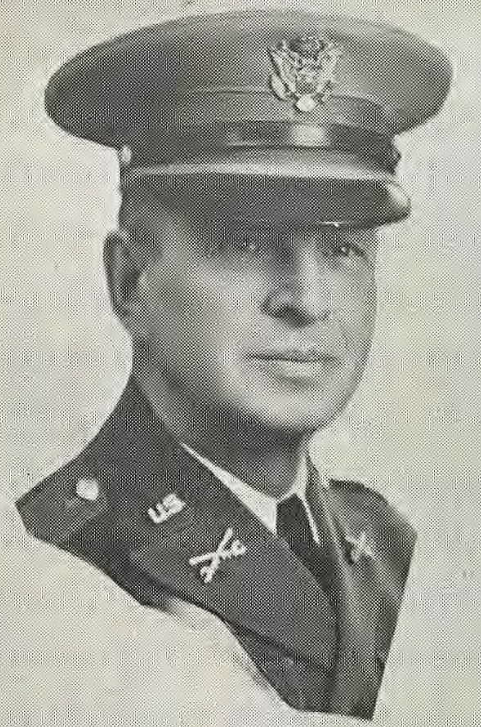
Brown at NMMI, 1937

Brown moved to Roswell, New Mexico in 1910 and became the football coach and athletic director at the New Mexico Military Institute. In his first year as the head coach at NMMI, he led the team to a 2–0 record with wins over New Mexico State (5–0) and New Mexico (80–0). He also led the team to undefeated records in 1912, 1916, 1917, and 1919. Players from his 1912 team were selected for four of the eleven spots on the 1912 All-Southwestern Eleven. In a historical account of that institution's football program, Brown is credited with the development of the program: "Gradually, football got under way and with the arrival of Mr. R.R. Brown and professional, precision coaching in 1910, interest in the sport boomed and regional success followed." With the exception of a brief period when he coached at New Mexico College of Agriculture, Brown remained the head coach at the New Mexico Military Institute until at least 1937.

Brown also served as the head football coach at New Mexico College of Agriculture, now known as New Mexico State University from 1923 to 1925. He led the 1923 New Mexico State Aggies football team to an undefeated 9–0 record, including victories over Hardin–Simmons, University of New Mexico, and University of Texas at El Paso.

In April 1928, Brown was selected as an aid in the southwest to Notre Dame Fighting Irish football coach Knute Rockne. In July 1928, Brown traveled to the 1928 Summer Olympics as part of Rockne's Olympic party, a group that also included Pop Warner.

As of 1918, Brown was also employed as a bank clerk at the First National Bank in Roswell. In a passport application filed that same year, he identified his profession as an athletic director and teacher. During World War I, he traveled to France for one year as part of a Y.M.C.A. service.

At the time of the 1930 U.S. Census, Brown was still living in Roswell, New Mexico, where he was employed as a teacher at the state school. Brown died on December 24, 1950, in Roswell. He had retired from his position as athletic director at the New Mexico Military Institute in 1948.

== Head coaching record ==
=== Football ===
Year	Team	Overall	Conference	Standing	Bowl/playoffs
VPI (Independent) (1902)
1902	VPI	3–2–1			
VPI:		3–2–1			
North Carolina Tar Heels (Independent) (1904)
1904	North Carolina	5–2–2			
North Carolina:		5–2–2			
Washington and Lee Generals (Independent) (1905–1908)
1905	Washington and Lee	7–2			
1906	Washington and Lee	4–1–1			
1907	Washington and Lee	3–2–1			
1908	Washington and Lee	5–2–1			
Washington and Lee:		19–7–3			
Tulane Olive and Blue (Independent) (1909)
1909	Tulane	4–3–2			L Bacardi
Tulane:		4–3–2	2–1–1		
New Mexico Military Broncos (Independent) (1910–1922)
1910	New Mexico Military	2–0			
1911	New Mexico Military	0–1–1			
1912	New Mexico Military	2–0			
1913	New Mexico Military	0–2			
1914	New Mexico Military	2–2			
1915	New Mexico Military	1–1			
1916	New Mexico Military	2–0			
1917	New Mexico Military	2–0			
1919	New Mexico Military	2–0–2			
1920	New Mexico Military	2–1–1			
1921	New Mexico Military	2–2			
1922	New Mexico Military	0–4			
New Mexico Military:		17–13–4			
New Mexico A&M Aggies (Independent) (1923–1925)
1923	New Mexico A&M	9–0			
1924	New Mexico A&M	7–3			
1925	New Mexico A&M	5–3–1			
New Mexico A&M:		21–6–1			
Total:		69–33–13			
