= 1902 South Carolina Gamecocks football team =

American college football season

1902 South Carolina Gamecocks football
- Conference: Independent
- Record: 6–1
- Head coach: Bob Williams (1st season)
- Captain: Thomas E. McCutchen

1902 Southern college football independents records
	Conf.			Overall
Team	W	L	T	W		L		T
Oklahoma A&M		–		1	–	0	–	0
Spring Hill		–		1	–	0	–	0
Texas A&M		–		7	–	0	–	2
Marshall		–		5	–	0	–	2
Virginia		–		8	–	1	–	1
South Carolina		–		6	–	1	–	0
Kentucky University		–		7	–	2	–	0
Howard (AL)		–		3	–	1	–	0
North Carolina		–		5	–	1	–	3
Georgetown		–		7	–	3	–	0
Arkansas		–		6	–	3	–	0
Oklahoma		–		6	–	3	–	0
Florida State College		–		2	–	1	–	0
Stetson		–		2	–	1	–	1
West Virginia		–		7	–	4	–	0
VPI		–		3	–	2	–	1
Davidson		–		4	–	4	–	1
East Florida Seminary		–		1	–	1	–	0
Kendall		–		1	–	1	–	0
Louisiana Industrial		–		1	–	1	–	1
Richmond		–		3	–	3	–	0
VMI		–		3	–	3	–	1
William & Mary		–		1	–	1	–	1
Baylor		–		3	–	4	–	2
North Carolina A&M		–		3	–	4	–	2
Maryland		–		3	–	5	–	2
Delaware		–		3	–	5	–	1
Florida Agricultural		–		1	–	2	–	1
Southwestern Louisiana Industrial		–		1	–	2	–	0
Columbian		–		1	–	3	–	0
Navy		–		2	–	7	–	1
TCU		–		0	–	5	–	1
Territorial Normal		–		0	–	1	–	0
Tusculum		–		0	–	1	–	0

The 1902 South Carolina Jaguars football team represented South Carolina College—now known as the University of South Carolina–as an independent during the 1902 college football season. Led by first-year head coach Bob Williams, South Carolina compiled a record of 6–1.

South Carolina's upset over rival Clemson gave rise to two traditions associated with the university: its mascot and the "Tiger Burn". In excitement over the win, some Carolina students began parading around with a drawing of a crowing gamecock over a beaten tiger, as cockfighting was still widespread in the early 1900s. Offended by the sign, several hundred Clemson cadets marched on South Carolina College, armed with weapons. The situation was resolved peacefully by faculty and police, with the sign being burned. The burning of the sign marked the start of the "Tiger Burn" tradition, and the name of the team changed to the South Carolina Gamecocks.

== Schedule ==
Date	Opponent	Site	Result	Attendance	Source
October 15	Guilford	Columbia, SC	W 10–0		
October 21	North Carolina Medical College*	Columbia, SC	W 60–0		
October 25	Bingham Military	Columbia, SC	W 28–0		
October 30	Clemson	Columbia, SC (rivalry)	W 12–6	5,000	
November 6	St. Albans	Columbia, SC	W 5–0		
November 14	at Furman	University Grounds; Greenville, SC	L 0–10		
November 28	Charleston Medical College	Columbia, SC	W 80–0		
*Non-conference game

== Roster ==
The following players were members of the 1902 football team according to the roster published in the 1902 and 1903 editions of The Garnet and Black, the South Carolina yearbook.

SCC Fighting Gamecocks 1902 roster
Quarterback: Lee; McGhee; Guards: McCutchen (Capt.); Salley; Ehrich; Tackles: Smith; Oliver; Center: Freeman	Ends: Foster; Nicholson; Halfbacks: Davis; Withers; Fullback: Gunter; Wilds	Substitutes: McKay; Epps; Finley; Ancrum
