= 1902 Oklahoma Sooners football team =

American college football season

1902 Oklahoma Sooners football
- Conference: Independent
- Record: 6–3
- Head coach: Mark McMahon (1st season)
- Captain: Clyde Bogle

1902 Southern college football independents records
	Conf.			Overall
Team	W	L	T	W		L		T
Oklahoma A&M		–		1	–	0	–	0
Spring Hill		–		1	–	0	–	0
Texas A&M		–		7	–	0	–	2
Marshall		–		5	–	0	–	2
Virginia		–		8	–	1	–	1
South Carolina		–		6	–	1	–	0
Kentucky University		–		7	–	2	–	0
Howard (AL)		–		3	–	1	–	0
North Carolina		–		5	–	1	–	3
Georgetown		–		7	–	3	–	0
Arkansas		–		6	–	3	–	0
Oklahoma		–		6	–	3	–	0
Florida State College		–		2	–	1	–	0
Stetson		–		2	–	1	–	1
West Virginia		–		7	–	4	–	0
VPI		–		3	–	2	–	1
Davidson		–		4	–	4	–	1
East Florida Seminary		–		1	–	1	–	0
Kendall		–		1	–	1	–	0
Louisiana Industrial		–		1	–	1	–	1
Richmond		–		3	–	3	–	0
VMI		–		3	–	3	–	1
William & Mary		–		1	–	1	–	1
Baylor		–		3	–	4	–	2
North Carolina A&M		–		3	–	4	–	2
Maryland		–		3	–	5	–	2
Delaware		–		3	–	5	–	1
Florida Agricultural		–		1	–	2	–	1
Southwestern Louisiana Industrial		–		1	–	2	–	0
Columbian		–		1	–	3	–	0
Navy		–		2	–	7	–	1
TCU		–		0	–	5	–	1
Territorial Normal		–		0	–	1	–	0
Tusculum		–		0	–	1	–	0

The 1902 Oklahoma Sooners football team represented the University of Oklahoma as an independent during the 1902 college football season. In their first year under head coach Mark McMahon, the Sooners compiled a 6–3 record, and outscored their opponents by a combined total of 175 to 60.

== Schedule ==
Date	Time	Opponent	Site	Result	Source
September 29	3:40 p.m.	Guthrie Athletic Club	Norman, Oklahoma Territory	W 62–0	
October 2		at Texas	Varsity Athletic Field; Austin, TX (rivalry)	L 6–22	
October 4		at Dallas Athletic Club	Dallas, TX	L 6–11	
October 13		Arkansas	University campus; Norman, Oklahoma Territory	W 28–0	
October 25		Oklahoma City Athletic Association	Norman, Oklahoma Territory	W 30–0	
November 3		at Kingfisher	Kingfisher, Oklahoma Territory	W 15–0	
November 12		at Missouri	Rollins Field; Columbia, MO (rivalry)	L 5–22	
November 14		at Kansas State Normal	Emporia, KS	W 6–5	
November 17		Kingfisher	Norman, Oklahoma Territory	W 17–0	
