= 1902 Stetson Hatters football team =

American college football season

1902 Stetson Hatters football
- Conference: Independent
- Record: 2–1–1
- Head coach: Seaton Fleming (2nd season)

1902 Southern college football independents records
	Conf.			Overall
Team	W	L	T	W		L		T
Oklahoma A&M		–		1	–	0	–	0
Spring Hill		–		1	–	0	–	0
Texas A&M		–		7	–	0	–	2
Marshall		–		5	–	0	–	2
Virginia		–		8	–	1	–	1
South Carolina		–		6	–	1	–	0
Kentucky University		–		7	–	2	–	0
Howard (AL)		–		3	–	1	–	0
North Carolina		–		5	–	1	–	3
Georgetown		–		7	–	3	–	0
Arkansas		–		6	–	3	–	0
Oklahoma		–		6	–	3	–	0
Stetson		–		2	–	1	–	1
East Florida Seminary		–		2	–	1	–	0
Florida State College		–		2	–	1	–	0
West Virginia		–		7	–	4	–	0
VPI		–		3	–	2	–	1
Davidson		–		4	–	4	–	1
Kendall		–		1	–	1	–	0
Louisiana Industrial		–		1	–	1	–	1
Richmond		–		3	–	3	–	0
VMI		–		3	–	3	–	1
William & Mary		–		1	–	1	–	1
Baylor		–		3	–	4	–	2
North Carolina A&M		–		3	–	4	–	2
Maryland		–		3	–	5	–	2
Delaware		–		3	–	5	–	1
Southwestern Louisiana Industrial		–		1	–	2	–	0
Florida Agricultural		–		1	–	3	–	1
Columbian		–		1	–	3	–	0
Navy		–		2	–	7	–	1
TCU		–		0	–	5	–	1
Territorial Normal		–		0	–	1	–	0
Tusculum		–		0	–	1	–	0

The 1902 Stetson Hatters football team represented the private Stetson College in the sport of American football during the 1902 college football season.

== Schedule ==
Date	Opponent	Site	Result	Source
November 14	at Florida Agricultural College	Lake City, FL	T 0–0	
November 22	at East Florida Seminary	Gainesville, FL	L 6–11	
November 27	Florida Agricultural College	DeLand, FL	W 22–5	
December 6	East Florida Seminary	DeLand, FL	W 2–0	
