= Graham Hobson =

American football coach

Biographical details
- Education: University of Virginia

Coaching career (HC unless noted)
- 1902: Richmond

Head coaching record
- Overall: 3–3

Graham Hobson was an American college football coach. He served as the head football coach at Richmond College—now known as the University of Richmond—in Richmond, Virginia, for one season, in 1902, compiling a record of 3–3.

== Head coaching record ==
| Year | Team | Overall | Conference | Standing | Bowl/playoffs |
|---|---|---|---|---|---|
Richmond Spiders (Independent) (1901)
| 1902 | Richmond | 3–3 | | | |
| Richmond: | | 3–3 | | | |
| Total: | | 3–3 | | | |
