= 1902 Baylor football team =

American college football season

1902 Baylor football
- Conference: Independent
- Record: 3–4–2
- Head coach: J. C. Ewing (1st season)
- Captain: C. D. Lester

1902 Southern college football independents records
	Conf.			Overall
Team	W	L	T	W		L		T
Oklahoma A&M		–		1	–	0	–	0
Spring Hill		–		1	–	0	–	0
Texas A&M		–		7	–	0	–	2
Marshall		–		5	–	0	–	2
Virginia		–		8	–	1	–	1
South Carolina		–		6	–	1	–	0
Kentucky University		–		7	–	2	–	0
Howard (AL)		–		3	–	1	–	0
North Carolina		–		5	–	1	–	3
Georgetown		–		7	–	3	–	0
Arkansas		–		6	–	3	–	0
Oklahoma		–		6	–	3	–	0
Florida State College		–		2	–	1	–	0
Stetson		–		2	–	1	–	1
West Virginia		–		7	–	4	–	0
VPI		–		3	–	2	–	1
Davidson		–		4	–	4	–	1
East Florida Seminary		–		1	–	1	–	0
Kendall		–		1	–	1	–	0
Louisiana Industrial		–		1	–	1	–	1
Richmond		–		3	–	3	–	0
VMI		–		3	–	3	–	1
William & Mary		–		1	–	1	–	1
Baylor		–		3	–	4	–	2
North Carolina A&M		–		3	–	4	–	2
Maryland		–		3	–	5	–	2
Delaware		–		3	–	5	–	1
Florida Agricultural		–		1	–	2	–	1
Southwestern Louisiana Industrial		–		1	–	2	–	0
Columbian		–		1	–	3	–	0
Navy		–		2	–	7	–	1
TCU		–		0	–	5	–	1
Territorial Normal		–		0	–	1	–	0
Tusculum		–		0	–	1	–	0

The 1902 Baylor football team was an American football team that represented Baylor University as an independent during the 1902 college football season. In its first season under head coach J. C. Ewing, the team compiled a 3–4–2 record.

This was Baylor's first losing season. The Thanksgiving game was played at the Lee canal athletic grounds.

== Schedule ==
Date	Opponent	Site	Result	Source
September 27	vs. Trinity (TX)	Fair Grounds; Dallas, TX	L 5–17	
October 11	vs. Texas A&M	Fair Grounds; Dallas, TX (rivalry)	L 6–11	
October 14	at Texas A&M	Fair Grounds; Bryan, TX	L 0–23	
October 18	Texas School for the Deaf	Carroll Field; Waco, TX	T 6–6	
October 27	at Trinity (TX)	Athletic Field; Waxahachie, TX	L 0–33	
November 1	TCU	Carroll Field; Waco, TX	T 0–0	
November 22	TCU	Carroll Field; Waco, TX	W 6–0	
November 27	St. Edward's	Carroll Field; Waco, TX	W 28–0	
December 1	TCU	West End Park; Waco, TX	W 20–0	
