= 1902 Virginia Orange and Blue football team =

American college football season

1902 Virginia Orange and Blue football

Southern champion
- Conference: Independent
- Record: 8–1–1
- Head coach: John de Saulles (1st season)
- Captain: H. Dorsey Waters
- Home stadium: Madison Hall Field

1902 Southern college football independents records
	Conf.			Overall
Team	W	L	T	W		L		T
Oklahoma A&M		–		1	–	0	–	0
Spring Hill		–		1	–	0	–	0
Texas A&M		–		7	–	0	–	2
Marshall		–		5	–	0	–	2
Virginia		–		8	–	1	–	1
South Carolina		–		6	–	1	–	0
Kentucky University		–		7	–	2	–	0
Howard (AL)		–		3	–	1	–	0
North Carolina		–		5	–	1	–	3
Georgetown		–		7	–	3	–	0
Arkansas		–		6	–	3	–	0
Oklahoma		–		6	–	3	–	0
Florida State College		–		2	–	1	–	0
Stetson		–		2	–	1	–	1
West Virginia		–		7	–	4	–	0
VPI		–		3	–	2	–	1
Davidson		–		4	–	4	–	1
East Florida Seminary		–		1	–	1	–	0
Kendall		–		1	–	1	–	0
Louisiana Industrial		–		1	–	1	–	1
Richmond		–		3	–	3	–	0
VMI		–		3	–	3	–	1
William & Mary		–		1	–	1	–	1
Baylor		–		3	–	4	–	2
North Carolina A&M		–		3	–	4	–	2
Maryland		–		3	–	5	–	2
Delaware		–		3	–	5	–	1
Florida Agricultural		–		1	–	2	–	1
Southwestern Louisiana Industrial		–		1	–	2	–	0
Columbian		–		1	–	3	–	0
Navy		–		2	–	7	–	1
TCU		–		0	–	5	–	1
Territorial Normal		–		0	–	1	–	0
Tusculum		–		0	–	1	–	0

The 1902 Virginia Orange and Blue football team represented the University of Virginia the 1902 college football season. Led by John de Saulles in his first and only season as head coach, the team compiled a record of 8–1–1 and claims a Southern championship.

== Schedule ==
Date	Time	Opponent	Site	Result	Attendance	Source
September 30		Washington and Lee	Madison Hall Field; Charlottesville, VA	W 16–0		
October 4		St Albans	Madison Hall Field; Charlottesville, VA	W 15–0		
October 18		at Nashville	Athletic Park; Nashville, TN	W 27–0		
October 20		at Kentucky University	Fourth Street Field; Lexington, KY	W 12–0		
October 25		St. John's (MD)	Madison Hall Field; Charlottesville, VA	W 22–0		
November 1		Davidson	Madison Hall Field; Charlottesville, VA	W 35–0		
November 8		vs. Lehigh	American League Park; Washington, DC	L 6–34	3,000	
November 15	4:00 p.m.	VPI	Lambeth Field; Charlottesville, VA (rivalry)	W 6–0	1,000	
November 22	2:30 p.m.	vs. Carlisle	Lafayette Field; Norfolk, VA	W 6–5		
November 27		vs. North Carolina	Broad Street Park; Richmond, VA (South's Oldest Rivalry)	T 12–12	4,000	

== Honors and awards ==
- All-Southern: Thomas Bronston, Henry Johnson, Walter Council, John Pollard.
