= 1901 Southwestern Louisiana Industrial football team =

American college football season

1901 Southwestern Louisiana Industrial football
- Conference: Independent
- Record: 2–0
- Head coach: Ashby Woodson (1st season)

1901 Southern college football independents records
	Conf.			Overall
Team	W	L	T	W		L		T
Southwestern Louisiana Industrial		–		2	–	0	–	0
Stetson		–		1	–	0	–	0
Georgia Tech		–		4	–	0	–	1
Marshall		–		2	–	0	–	1
Kentucky University		–		7	–	1	–	1
VPI		–		6	–	1	–	0
Nashville		–		6	–	1	–	1
Virginia		–		8	–	2	–	0
Texas		–		8	–	2	–	1
Davidson		–		4	–	2	–	0
Baylor		–		5	–	3	–	0
Gallaudet		–		4	–	2	–	2
Sewanee		–		4	–	2	–	2
William & Mary		–		2	–	1	–	1
Navy		–		6	–	4	–	1
VMI		–		4	–	3	–	0
Oklahoma		–		3	–	2	–	0
West Virginia		–		3	–	2	–	0
Delaware		–		5	–	4	–	0
Georgetown		–		3	–	3	–	2
Kendall		–		2	–	2	–	0
Spring Hill		–		0	–	0	–	1
Wilmington Conference Academy		–		2	–	2	–	0
Oklahoma A&M		–		2	–	3	–	0
South Carolina		–		3	–	4	–	0
Arkansas		–		3	–	5	–	0
Add-Ran		–		1	–	2	–	1
Furman		–		1	–	2	–	1
Chilocco		–		2	–	5	–	0
North Carolina A&M		–		1	–	2	–	0
Texas A&M		–		1	–	4	–	0
Maryland		–		1	–	7	–	0
Richmond		–		1	–	7	–	0
Florida Agricultural		–		0	–	1	–	0
Louisiana Industrial		–		0	–	2	–	0
Tusculum		–				–

The 1901 Southwestern Louisiana Industrial football team was an American football team that represented the Southwestern Louisiana Industrial Institute (now known as the University of Louisiana at Lafayette) as an independent during the 1901 college football season. In their first year under head coach Ashby Woodson, the team compiled a 2–0 record. This is the first season of what is now Louisiana Ragin' Cajuns football.

== Schedule ==
Date	Opponent	Site	Result	Source
December 21	at St. Landry High School	Opelousas, LA	W 6–5	
January 12, 1902	St. Landry High School	Lafayette, LA	W 21–0	
