= 1902 VMI Keydets football team =

American college football season

1902 VMI Keydets football
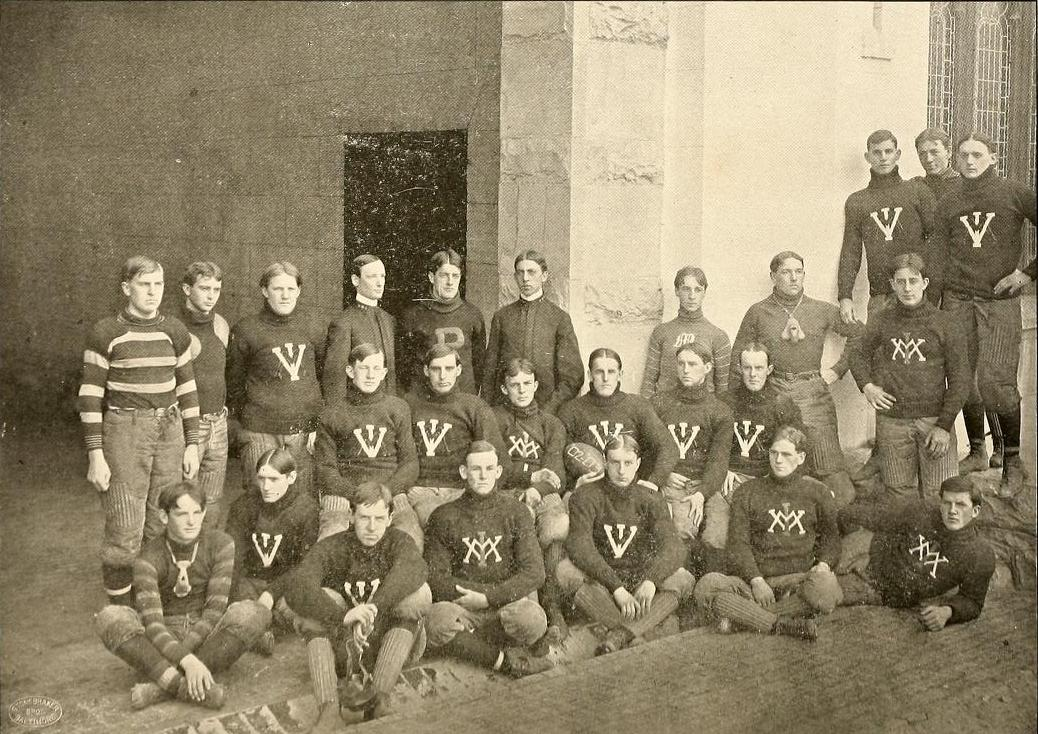
- Conference: Independent
- Record: 3–3–1
- Head coach: Sam Walker (3rd season)

1902 Southern college football independents records
	Conf.			Overall
Team	W	L	T	W		L		T
Oklahoma A&M		–		1	–	0	–	0
Spring Hill		–		1	–	0	–	0
Texas A&M		–		7	–	0	–	2
Marshall		–		5	–	0	–	2
Virginia		–		8	–	1	–	1
South Carolina		–		6	–	1	–	0
Kentucky University		–		7	–	2	–	0
Howard (AL)		–		3	–	1	–	0
North Carolina		–		5	–	1	–	3
Georgetown		–		7	–	3	–	0
Arkansas		–		6	–	3	–	0
Oklahoma		–		6	–	3	–	0
Florida State College		–		2	–	1	–	0
Stetson		–		2	–	1	–	1
West Virginia		–		7	–	4	–	0
VPI		–		3	–	2	–	1
Davidson		–		4	–	4	–	1
East Florida Seminary		–		1	–	1	–	0
Kendall		–		1	–	1	–	0
Louisiana Industrial		–		1	–	1	–	1
Richmond		–		3	–	3	–	0
VMI		–		3	–	3	–	1
William & Mary		–		1	–	1	–	1
Baylor		–		3	–	4	–	2
North Carolina A&M		–		3	–	4	–	2
Maryland		–		3	–	5	–	2
Delaware		–		3	–	5	–	1
Florida Agricultural		–		1	–	2	–	1
Southwestern Louisiana Industrial		–		1	–	2	–	0
Columbian		–		1	–	3	–	0
Navy		–		2	–	7	–	1
TCU		–		0	–	5	–	1
Territorial Normal		–		0	–	1	–	0
Tusculum		–		0	–	1	–	0

The 1902 VMI Keydets football team represented the Virginia Military Institute (VMI) in their 12th season of organized football. VMI went 3–3–1 in what would be Sam Walker last season as VMI head coach.

== Schedule ==
Date	Opponent	Site	Result	Attendance
October 11	St. Alban's	VMI Parade Ground; Lexington, VA	T 0–0	
October 18	at Georgetown	Georgetown Field; Washington, DC	L 11–23	
October 25	Richmond	VMI Parade Ground; Lexington, VA (rivalry)	W 33–0	
November 1	vs. North Carolina	Unknown; Lynchburg, VA	L 10–17	
November 8	Hampden–Sydney	VMI Parade Ground; Lexington, VA	W 29–0	
November 15	Washington and Lee	VMI Parade Ground; Lexington, VA	W 11–0	
November 27	vs. VPI	Lafayette Field; Norfolk, VA (rivalry)	L 5–50	6,000
