= Houston Gwin =

American football player and coach (1876–1958)

William Gwin
Biographical details
- Born: October 30, 1876
- Died: May 15, 1958 (aged 81)

Playing career
- 1900–1901: Auburn

Coaching career (HC unless noted)
- 1902–1903: Howard (AL)

William Houston Gwin, also credited as William Houston Guinn in some media, (October 30, 1876 – May 15, 1958) was an American football player and coach. He served as the head football coach at Samford University (then known as Howard College) from 1902 to 1903.

He was a collegiate football player at Auburn University and scored a touchdown against Alabama in the 1901 Iron Bowl.
