= Frank Foust =

American football player

Profile
- Position: Tackle

Personal information
- Listed weight: 190 lb (86 kg)

Career information
- College: North Carolina (1900–1903)

Awards and highlights
- All-Southern (1902, 1903)

Frank Lee Foust was a college football player.

== University of North Carolina ==
Foust was a prominent tackle for the North Carolina Tar Heels football teams of the University of North Carolina from 1900 to 1903. One Dr. R. B. Lawson picked Foust as a guard on his all-time North Carolina football team.

=== 1902 ===
Foust was captain and All-Southern in 1902. The team tied Virginia in its rivalry game.

=== 1903 ===
Foust was selected All-Southern by John Heisman in 1903.
