= 1902 college football season =

American college football season

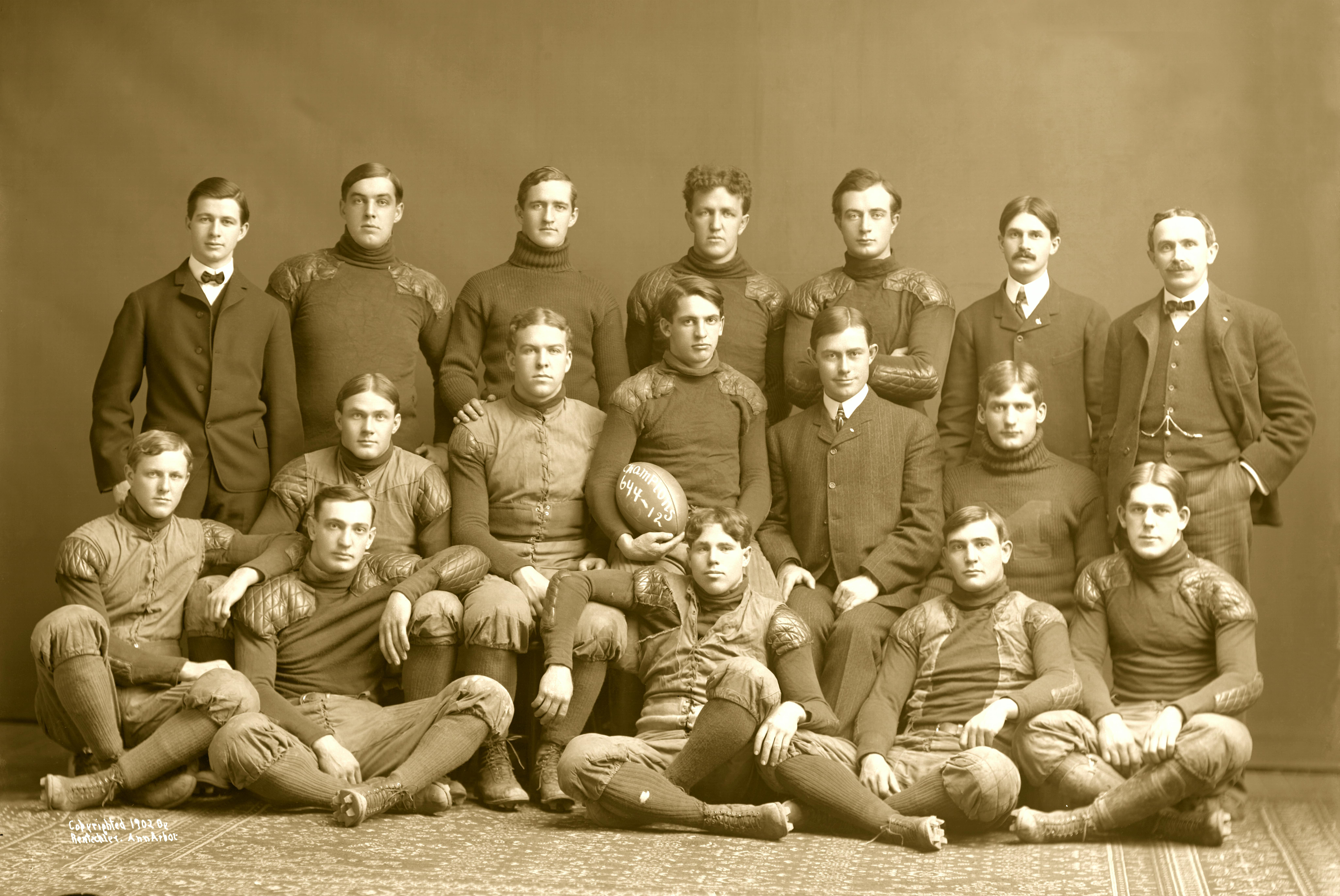
- Michigan team picture.
- Total No. of teams: 72
- Regular season: September 13 to November 29
- Champion(s): Michigan; Yale

The 1902 college football season had no clear-cut champion, with the Official NCAA Division I Football Records Book listing Michigan and Yale as having been selected national champions.

== Conference and program changes ==
=== Conference changes ===
- One conference began play in 1902:
  - Ohio Athletic Conference – now a Division III conference

=== Membership changes ===
School	1901 Conference	1902 Conference
Centre College merged with Central University Colonels	Independent	SIAA
Georgia Tech Yellow Jackets	Independent	SIAA
Southwestern Louisiana Industrial football	Program Established	Independent

== Conference standings ==
=== Major conference standings ===
1902 Colorado Football Association standings
	Conf.					Overall
Team	W		L		T	W		L		T
Colorado $	4	–	0	–	0	5	–	1	–	0
Colorado Mines	2	–	1	–	1	4	–	1	–	2
Colorado College	2	–	2	–	0	3	–	4	–	0
Denver	1	–	3	–	0	3	–	4	–	1
Colorado Agricultural	0	–	3	–	1	1	–	3	–	2
$ – Conference champion

1902 Northwest Intercollegiate Athletic Association football standings
	Conf.					Overall
Team	W		L		T	W		L		T
Washington $	4	–	0	–	0	5	–	1	–	0
Oregon	1	–	0	–	1	3	–	1	–	3
Washington State	2	–	1	–	0	2	–	3	–	0
Oregon Agricultural	0	–	1	–	1	4	–	1	–	1
Whitman	1	–	3	–	0	2	–	4	–	0
Idaho	0	–	3	–	0	1	–	3	–	1
$ – Conference champion

1902 Southern Intercollegiate Athletic Association football standings
	Conf.					Overall
Team	W		L		T	W		L		T
Clemson $	5	–	0	–	0	6	–	1	–	0
Vanderbilt	6	–	1	–	0	8	–	1	–	0
LSU +	5	–	1	–	0	6	–	1	–	0
Texas	4	–	1	–	0	6	–	3	–	1
Sewanee	4	–	2	–	0	6	–	2	–	0
Tennessee	4	–	2	–	0	6	–	2	–	0
Georgia	3	–	2	–	1	4	–	2	–	1
Ole Miss	3	–	3	–	0	4	–	3	–	0
Nashville	2	–	2	–	0	2	–	4	–	0
Auburn	2	–	4	–	1	2	–	4	–	1
Alabama	2	–	4	–	0	4	–	4	–	0
Cumberland (TN)	1	–	4	–	0	3	–	5	–	0
Tulane	0	–	3	–	2	1	–	4	–	2
Furman	0	–	2	–	1	4	–	3	–	4
Georgia Tech	0	–	4	–	2	0	–	6	–	2
Mississippi A&M	0	–	4	–	1	1	–	4	–	1
Kentucky State	0	–	2	–	0	4	–	6	–	1
$ – Conference champion; + LSU claims a co-championship

1902 Western Conference football standings
	Conf.					Overall
Team	W		L		T	W		L		T
Michigan $	5	–	0	–	0	11	–	0	–	0
Chicago	5	–	1	–	0	11	–	1	–	0
Minnesota	3	–	1	–	0	9	–	2	–	1
Illinois	4	–	2	–	0	10	–	2	–	1
Purdue	2	–	2	–	0	7	–	2	–	1
Wisconsin	1	–	3	–	0	6	–	3	–	0
Iowa	0	–	3	–	0	5	–	4	–	0
Northwestern	0	–	4	–	0	6	–	6	–	0
Indiana	0	–	4	–	0	3	–	5	–	1
$ – Conference champion

=== Independents ===
1902 Eastern college football independents records
	Conf.			Overall
Team	W	L	T	W		L		T
Ursinus		–		9	–	0	–	0
Yale		–		11	–	0	–	1
Geneva		–		7	–	0	–	0
Harvard		–		11	–	1	–	0
Princeton		–		8	–	1	–	0
Army		–		6	–	1	–	1
Frankin & Marshall		–		7	–	2	–	0
Dartmouth		–		6	–	2	–	1
Holy Cross		–		6	–	2	–	1
Syracuse		–		6	–	2	–	1
Carlisle		–		8	–	3	–	0
Cornell		–		8	–	3	–	0
Lafayette		–		8	–	3	–	0
Amherst		–		7	–	3	–	0
Penn State		–		7	–	3	–	0
Penn		–		9	–	4	–	0
Lehigh		–		7	–	3	–	1
Vermont		–		5	–	3	–	2
Colgate		–		5	–	3	–	1
NYU		–		5	–	3	–	0
Bucknell		–		6	–	4	–	0
Washington & Jefferson		–		6	–	4	–	0
Columbia		–		6	–	4	–	1
Springfield Training School		–		3	–	2	–	1
Villanova		–		4	–	3	–	0
Brown		–		5	–	4	–	1
Swarthmore		–		6	–	6	–	0
Western U. of Penn.		–		5	–	6	–	1
New Hampshire		–		2	–	3	–	1
Buffalo		–		3	–	5	–	1
Tufts		–		4	–	6	–	1
Dickinson		–		4	–	6	–	0
Fordham		–		2	–	4	–	1
Wesleyan		–		3	–	6	–	1
Rutgers		–		3	–	7	–	0
Navy		–		2	–	7	–	1
Drexel		–		1	–	4	–	1
Temple		–		1	–	4	–	1
Pittsburgh College		–		1	–	6	–	0
Boston College		–		0	–	8	–	0

1902 Midwestern college football independents records
	Conf.			Overall
Team	W	L	T	W		L		T
Nebraska		–		9	–	0	–	0
South Dakota		–		9	–	0	–	0
North Dakota Agricultural		–		4	–	0	–	0
Central Michigan		–		4	–	0	–	0
Ohio Medical		–		9	–	1	–	0
Marquette		–		6	–	1	–	1
Knox		–		9	–	2	–	0
Northern Illinois State		–		5	–	1	–	1
Haskell		–		8	–	2	–	1
Notre Dame		–		6	–	2	–	1
Drake		–		5	–	2	–	1
Lincoln (MO)		–		2	–	1	–	0
Mount Union		–		6	–	3	–	0
Iowa State		–		6	–	3	–	1
Carthage		–		2	–	1	–	1
Cincinnati		–		4	–	2	–	2
Missouri		–		5	–	3	–	0
Miami (OH)		–		5	–	3	–	1
Kansas		–		6	–	4	–	0
South Dakota Agricultural		–		3	–	2	–	0
Fairmount		–		4	–	3	–	1
Detroit College		–		3	–	3	–	0
Lake Forest		–		4	–	4	–	1
Lincoln (MO)		–		1	–	1	–	0
Western Illinois		–		2	–	2	–	0
Wittenberg		–		3	–	4	–	2
Washburn		–		3	–	4	–	0
Doane		–		2	–	3	–	0
Heidelberg		–		3	–	5	–	1
Wabash		–		2	–	4	–	2
Buchtel		–		2	–	5	–	0
Washington University		–		2	–	6	–	1
Butler		–		1	–	3	–	0
Kansas State		–		2	–	6	–	0
Michigan State Normal		–		1	–	5	–	1
Iowa State Normal		–		1	–	6	–	1
Ohio		–		0	–	5	–	1

1902 Southern college football independents records
	Conf.			Overall
Team	W	L	T	W		L		T
Oklahoma A&M		–		1	–	0	–	0
Spring Hill		–		1	–	0	–	0
Texas A&M		–		7	–	0	–	2
Marshall		–		5	–	0	–	2
Virginia		–		8	–	1	–	1
South Carolina		–		6	–	1	–	0
Kentucky University		–		7	–	2	–	0
Howard (AL)		–		3	–	1	–	0
North Carolina		–		5	–	1	–	3
Georgetown		–		7	–	3	–	0
Arkansas		–		6	–	3	–	0
Oklahoma		–		6	–	3	–	0
Florida State College		–		2	–	1	–	0
Stetson		–		2	–	1	–	1
West Virginia		–		7	–	4	–	0
VPI		–		3	–	2	–	1
Davidson		–		4	–	4	–	1
East Florida Seminary		–		1	–	1	–	0
Kendall		–		1	–	1	–	0
Louisiana Industrial		–		1	–	1	–	1
Richmond		–		3	–	3	–	0
VMI		–		3	–	3	–	1
William & Mary		–		1	–	1	–	1
Baylor		–		3	–	4	–	2
North Carolina A&M		–		3	–	4	–	2
Maryland		–		3	–	5	–	2
Delaware		–		3	–	5	–	1
Florida Agricultural		–		1	–	2	–	1
Southwestern Louisiana Industrial		–		1	–	2	–	0
Columbian		–		1	–	3	–	0
Navy		–		2	–	7	–	1
TCU		–		0	–	5	–	1
Territorial Normal		–		0	–	1	–	0
Tusculum		–		0	–	1	–	0

1902 Far West college football independents records
	Conf.			Overall
Team	W	L	T	W		L		T
California		–		8	–	0	–	0
Arizona		–		5	–	0	–	0
Wyoming		–		1	–	0	–	0
Montana Agricultural		–		4	–	0	–	1
Stanford		–		6	–	1	–	0
Utah		–		5	–	2	–	1
Tempe Normal		–		2	–	1	–	0
USC		–		2	–	3	–	0
Idaho		–		1	–	3	–	1
Nevada State		–		1	–	2	–	0
New Mexico A&M		–		0	–	1	–	2
Utah Agricultural		–		0	–	5	–	1
Montana		–		0	–	2	–	0

=== Minor conferences ===
Conference	Champion(s)	Record
Michigan Intercollegiate Athletic Association	Alma	4–1
Ohio Athletic Conference	Case	5–0

=== Minor conference standings ===
1902 Michigan Intercollegiate Athletic Association football standings
	Conf.					Overall
Team	W		L		T	W		L		T
Olivet +	5	–	1	–	0	5	–	1	–	0
Alma +	4	–	1	–	0	7	–	1	–	0
Albion	4	–	3	–	0	4	–	6	–	0
Michigan Agricultural	2	–	2	–	0	4	–	5	–	0
Hillsdale	0	–	3	–	0	2	–	4	–	0
Kalamazoo	0	–	5	–	0	3	–	5	–	1
+ – Conference co-champions

1902 Ohio Athletic Conference football standings
	Conf.					Overall
Team	W		L		T	W		L		T
Case $	5	–	0	–	0	6	–	3	–	0
Ohio State	2	–	1	–	0	6	–	2	–	2
Ohio Wesleyan	2	–	2	–	0	7	–	3	–	0
Oberlin	1	–	2	–	0	4	–	4	–	0
Kenyon	1	–	3	–	0	2	–	4	–	2
Western Reserve	0	–	3	–	0	3	–	6	–	0
$ – Conference champion

== Awards and honors ==
=== All-Americans ===
The consensus All-America team included:

Position	Name	Height	Weight (lbs.)	Class	Hometown	Team
QB	Foster Rockwell			So.	Vermont	Yale
HB	George B. Chadwick			Sr.	Brooklyn, New York	Yale
HB	Thomas A. Barry			Sr.	Brockton, Massachusetts	Brown
FB	Blondy Graydon			Sr.	Cincinnati, Ohio	Harvard
E	Tom Shevlin	5'10"	195	Fr.	Minneapolis, Minnesota	Yale
T	Ralph Kinney			Jr.		Yale
T	James Hogan	5'10"	210	So.	County Tipperary, Ireland	Yale
G	Edgar Glass			Sr.	Syracuse, New York	Yale
G	John DeWitt	6'1"	198	Jr.	Phillipsburg, New Jersey	Princeton
C	Henry Holt			Sr.	Spuyten Duyvil, Bronx, New York	Yale
C	Robert Boyers			Sr.	Bellaire, Ohio	Army
G	Bill Warner	6'4"	210	Sr.	Springville, New York	Cornell
T	Paul Bunker	5'11"	186	Sr.	Alpena, Michigan	Army
E	Edward Bowditch			Jr.	Albany, New York	Harvard

=== Statistical leaders ===
- Team scoring most points: Michigan, 644
- Player scoring most points: Albert E. Herrnstein, Michigan, 130
- Rushing leader: Willie Heston, Michigan, 487
- Rushing avg leader: Willie Heston, 8.7
- Rushing touchdowns leader: Al Herrnstein, 26
