= Tusculum Pioneers football, 1901–1910 =

American college football seasons

The Tusculum Pioneers football team represented Tusculum College (now known as Tusculum University) in American football. The program was founded in 1901.

== 1901 ==
1901 Tusculum Pioneers football
- Conference: Independent
- Record: Unknown
- Head coach: Unknown

The 1901 Tusculum Pioneers football team represented Tusculum College during the 1901 college football season as an independent. This year was the inaugural season for the school, but the results of games were not recorded.

== 1902 ==
1902 Tusculum Pioneers football
- Conference: Independent
- Record: 0–1
- Head coach: Unknown

The 1902 Tusculum Pioneers football team represented Tusculum College during the 1902 college football season as an independent. The school recorded one game, a 0–18 loss against the Washington College in Greenville, Tennessee.

=== Schedule ===
| Date | Opponent | Site | Result |
|---|---|---|---|
| Unknown | Washington College | | L 0–18 |

== 1903 ==
1903 Tusculum Pioneers football
- Conference: Independent
- Record: 1–1
- Head coach: Stephen Andrew Lynch (1st season)
- Captain: Whitehurst

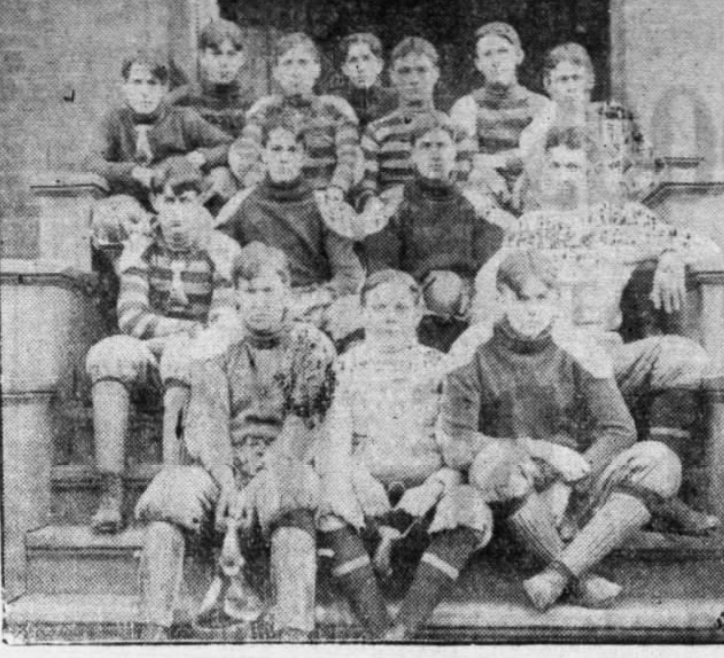
The Tusculum Pioneers were the only team to score against the Baker-Himel football team (pictured) in 1903.

The 1903 Tusculum Pioneers football team represented Tusculum College during the 1903 college football season as an independent. They played two games against Baker-Himel School, losing the first and winning the second. The team was coached by Stephen Andrew Lynch, who also at the time coached the football team at Maryville University.

The Tusculum team opened the season in October 31, playing the local Baker-Himel School. The Pioneers were shut out, 0–18, on Baldwin Field. The first score of the game was made on the opening play, after Tusculum fumbled and Leach, of Baker-Himel, returned it for a touchdown.

Another fumble on the next drive set up a second touchdown for the opposing team, making the score 0–12. After a punt made by Tusculum later in the game, "steady gains were made through the line" and "Little Kipp" ran for the game's third score. Though Tusculum "pulled together in great shape" and gave Baker-Himel "all that it could do" in the second half, they were not able to score and the game ended 0–18.

Tusculum scheduled a rematch after the loss, and rebounded with a 13–0 shutout on November 9. They were the only team to score any points against Baker-Himel during the 1903 season.

Though the Tusculum team "was in good training and expect[ed] to engage in several contests during Christmas week", no other games were played.

=== Schedule ===
| Date | Opponent | Site | Result |
|---|---|---|---|
| October 31 | Baker-Himel | Knoxville, Tennessee · Baldwin Field | L 0–18 |
| November 9 | Baker-Himel | | W 13–0 |

== 1904 ==
1904 Tusculum Pioneers football
- Conference: Independent
- Record: 2–1
- Head coach: Unknown

The 1904 Tusculum Pioneers football team represented Tusculum College during the 1904 college football season as an independent.

The team's first game was on October 21, against Bingham School. The Pioneers "seemed all out of sort", allowing 36 points in the first half while scoring none themselves. By the time Bingham had scored 63 points, they put in freshman members of the school to finish the game. Though the freshman team did not score, they were five yards away from the Tusculum goal line when the final whistle blew.

A second game was played against Morristown High School, with Tusculum being victorious 22–0. It was played on the Pioneers' field, and was "clean from start to finish".

They played another game on c. November 15, beating the Carson-Newman Eagles by a score of 35–0. (Note: Tusculum University lists this game as a 0–35 loss.) The game was played in four inches of snow.

=== Schedule ===
| Date | Opponent | Site | Result |
|---|---|---|---|
| October 21 | Bingham School | | L 0–63 |
| November 1 | Morristown High School (Note: Tusculum University does not list this game in their media guide.) | | W 22–0 |
| c. November 15 | Carson-Newman | | W 35–0 |

== 1905 ==
1905 Tusculum Pioneers football
- Conference: Independent
- Record: 1–0
- Head coach: Unknown

The 1905 Tusculum Pioneers football team represented Tusculum College during the 1905 college football season as an independent.

The season's only game was played on November 17, against the Bristol YMCA. Tusculum won by a score of 16–6.

=== Schedule ===
| Date | Opponent | Site | Result |
|---|---|---|---|
| November 17 | Bristol YMCA | Tusculum, Tennessee | W 16–6 |

== 1906 ==
1906 Tusculum Pioneers football
- Conference: Independent
- Record: 2–2–1
- Head coach: Unknown

The 1906 Tusculum Pioneers football team represented Tusculum College during the 1906 college football season as an independent.

Their first game was against Morristown High School. The game was witnessed by "a large crowd", and Tusculum was victorious 23–0.

A second game was played on November 26, at Baker-Himel Park, versus the Knox County Central High School. The Pioneers lost, 6–8. The following day, Tusculum played a game against the Baker-Himel School at the same venue, losing 0–6.

Two other games were played on unknown dates, one against Greeneville High School and one against Knoxville High School, with the Pioneers winning the first and tying in the latter.

=== Schedule ===
| Date | Time | Opponent | Site | Result | Attendance | Source |
|---|---|---|---|---|---|---|
| November 2 | | at Morristown High School | Morristown, TN | W 23–0 | "a large crowd" | |
| November 26 | 3:00 p.m. | at Knox County Central High School | Baker-Himel Park; Knoxville, TN | L 6–8 | | |
| November 27 | 2:30 p.m. | at Baker-Himel | Baker-Himel Park; Knoxville, TN | L 0–6 | | |
| Unknown | | Greeneville High School | | W 11–6 | | |
| Unknown | | Knoxville High School | | T 12–12 | | |

== 1907 ==
1907 Tusculum Pioneers football
- Conference: Independent
- Record: 0–0

The 1907 Tusculum Pioneers football team was to represent Tusculum College in 1907 college football season as an independent. Though a game was scheduled against Central on October 5, it was not played, and the school did not field a team for the 1907 season.

=== Schedule ===
| Date | Opponent | Site | Result |
|---|---|---|---|
| October 5 | Central | Tusculum, Tennessee | Cancelled |

== 1908 ==
1908 Tusculum Pioneers football
- Conference: Independent
- Record: 0–3–1
- Head coach: F. W. Greg (1st season)

The 1908 Tusculum Pioneers football team represented Tusculum College during the 1908 college football season as an independent. The team was coached by F. W. Greg, who previously played for Sewanee and Cornell.

The first game of the season was scheduled against King College. Tusculum had accepted and cancelled several other matches with King before accepting October 9 as the date for the game. As the King College players boarded a train to travel to the game, the Tusculum officials sent a telephone message saying that due to rain the prior night, they were postponing the game. The manager of King College, "not in a habit of postponing a football game", traveled to Tusculum anyway, before receiving message that the Pioneers refused to play. That upset the King coach so much that he cancelled the postponed matchup, which was scheduled on October 14.

On October 13, the Pioneers played a game against Greeneville High School, losing 0–4. The game was played in two 25-minute halves.

Four days later, Tusculum played a game against Baker-Himel School, losing by a score of 5–11. "The beginning was rough, but the referee soon made it go on without any trouble," wrote The Bristol Evening News.

According to their media guide, four other games were played in the season. Two were against the Johnson City Athletic Association, with a 0–6 loss in the first matchup, and a 0–0 tie in the second. They also played a game versus Roanoke College, with an unknown score, and one with a team called "St. Albans", also with an unknown score.

=== Schedule ===
| Date | Time | Opponent | Site | Result |
|---|---|---|---|---|
| October 9 | | King | | Cancelled |
| October 13 | | Greeneville High School | | L 0–4 |
| October 17 | 3:30 p.m. | Baker-Himel | | L 5–11 |
| Unknown | | Johnson City AA | | L 0–6 |
| Unknown | | Johnson City AA | | T 0–0 |
| Unknown | | Roanoke | | Unknown |
| Unknown | | St. Albans | | Unknown |

== 1909 ==
1909 Tusculum Pioneers football
- Conference: Independent
- Record: 0–3–1
- Head coach: Unknown

The 1909 Tusculum Pioneers football team represented Tusculum College during the 1909 college football season as an independent.

The Pioneers opened the season against King College, on September 25, suffering a 0–12 defeat.

A merger of Washington College and Tusculum's football teams played the Bingham School on October 7, losing 0–5.

The team's next game was against Asheville School on an unknown date, where the Pioneers lost 0–23.

They scheduled a rematch against King College on October 23, and played to a scoreless tie. A third game with King was to be played on November 6, but was cancelled. The school later announced that they were cancelling football for the rest of the season after "numerous tragedies occurred on the gridiron". They did not field a team again until 1913.

=== Schedule ===
| Date | Opponent | Site | Result |
|---|---|---|---|
| September 25 | at King | Fairmount gridiron; Bristol, TN | L 0–12 (Note: Tusculum lists the score as 11–0 in their media guide.) |
| October 7 | vs. Bingham School | Riverside Park; Asheville, NC | L 0–5 |
| | Asheville School | | L 0–23 |
| October 23 | King | Greenville, TN | T 0–0 |
| November 6 | King | | Cancelled |

== 1910 ==
The 1910 Tusculum Pioneers football team was to represent Tusculum College in the 1910 college football season as an independent. The school cancelled the 1910 season, and did not play again until 1913.
