= Don Shula =

American football player and coach (1930–2020)

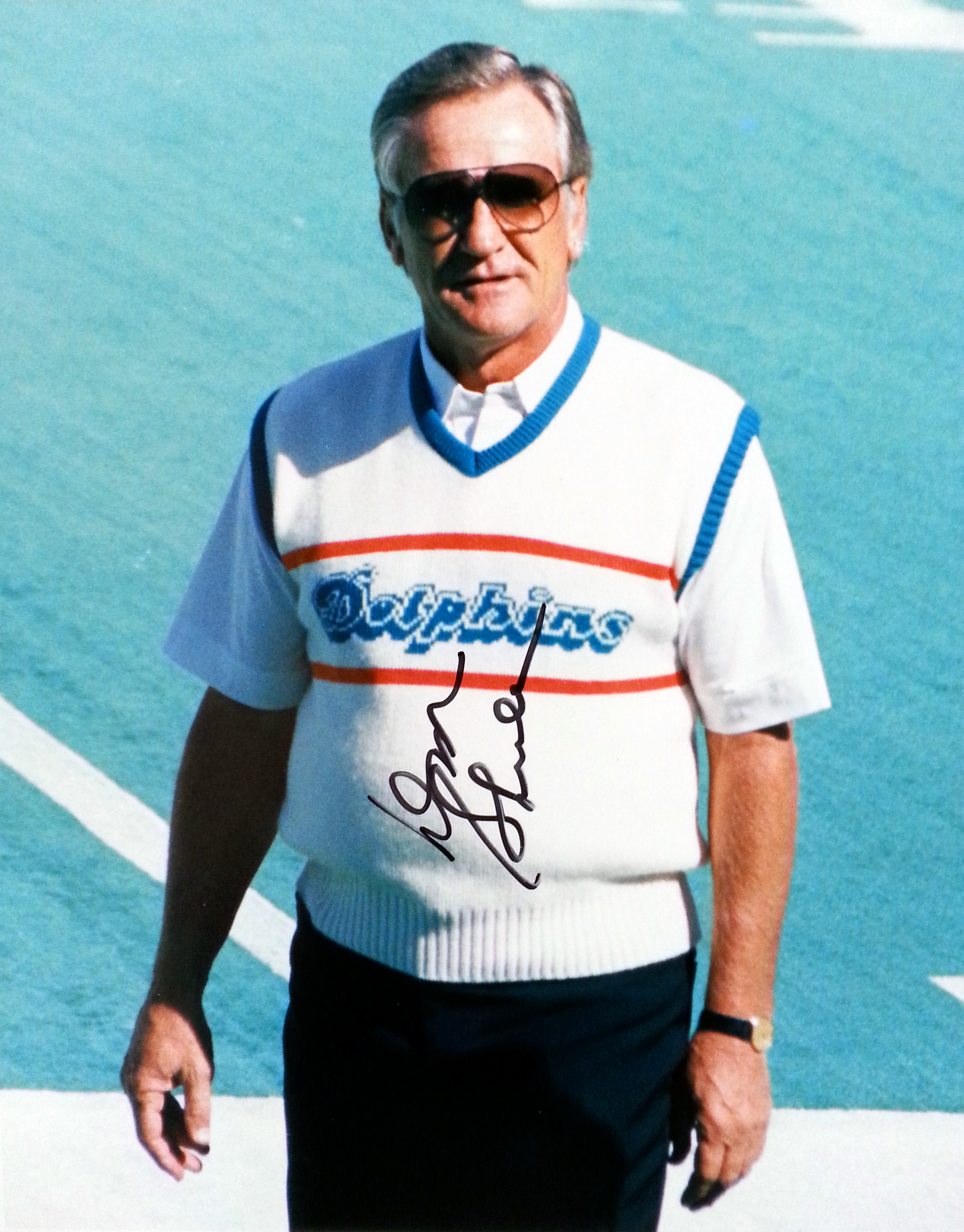
- Shula in 1987

No. 96, 44, 25, 26
- Position: Defensive back

Personal information
- Born: January 4, 1930; Grand River, Ohio, U.S.
- Died: May 4, 2020 (aged 90); Indian Creek, Florida, U.S.
- Listed height: 5 ft 11 in (1.80 m)
- Listed weight: 190 lb (86 kg)

Career information
- High school: Harvey (Painesville, Ohio)
- College: John Carroll
- NFL draft: 1951: 9th round, 110th overall pick

Career history

Playing
- Cleveland Browns (1951–1952); Baltimore Colts (1953–1956); Washington Redskins (1957)

Coaching
- Virginia (1958) Defensive backs coach; Kentucky (1959) Defensive backs coach; Detroit Lions (1960) Defensive backs coach; Detroit Lions (1961–1962) Defensive coordinator; Baltimore Colts (1963–1969) Head coach; Miami Dolphins (1970–1995) Head coach

Awards and highlights
- 2× Super Bowl champion (VII, VIII); NFL champion (1968); 4× AP NFL Coach of the Year (1964, 1967, 1968, 1972); Sports Illustrated Sportsman of the Year (1993); Lamar Hunt Award (2013); NFL 1970s All-Decade Team; NFL 100th Anniversary All-Time Team; Miami Dolphins Honor Roll; Dolphins Walk of Fame; NFL records: Most regular season wins as a head coach (328); Most total wins as a head coach (347); Coached only undefeated season through regular season and playoffs

Career NFL statistics
- Games played: 73
- Interceptions: 21
- Stats at Pro Football Reference

Head coaching record
- Regular season: 328–156–6 (.676)
- Postseason: 19–17 (.528)
- Career: 347–173–6 (.665)
- Coaching profile at Pro Football Reference
- Executive profile at Pro Football Reference
- Pro Football Hall of Fame

Donald Francis Shula (January 4, 1930 – May 4, 2020) was an American football defensive back and coach who served as a head coach in the National Football League (NFL) from 1963 to 1995. The head coach of the Miami Dolphins for most of his career, Shula is the NFL's winningest head coach at 347 career victories and 328 regular season victories. He is regarded as one of the greatest head coaches of all time.

Shula held his first head coaching position with the Baltimore Colts for seven seasons and spent his next 26 seasons with Miami. With the Dolphins, he led the team to two consecutive Super Bowl titles in Super Bowl VII and Super Bowl VIII. His first Super Bowl title during 1972 is the only perfect season in NFL history.

Shula was the first head coach to appear in six Super Bowls, five with the Dolphins and one with the Colts. His six Super Bowl appearances rank second among head coaches and he has the most Super Bowl losses at four. (Note: Shula is tied with Bud Grant, Marv Levy, and Dan Reeves for the most Super Bowl losses.) He was also the first head coach to bring two franchises to the Super Bowl and appear in three consecutive Super Bowls, which he accomplished with the Dolphins from 1971 to 1973. Having guided Baltimore to Super Bowl III and Miami to Super Bowl VI, Shula is the only head coach to lead two franchises to their Super Bowl debut. He was inducted to the Pro Football Hall of Fame in 1997.

== Early life ==
Shula was born on January 4, 1930, in Grand River, Ohio, a small town along the Lake Erie shore in the northeastern part of the state. His parents, Dan and Mary Shula (Dénes Süle and Mary Miller), were of Hungarian origin, having immigrated when they were children. Shula's father Dan worked for $9 a week at a rose nursery and saved up to buy the small house where Shula spent his early childhood. The house was next door to a grocery store in Grand River owned by Mary's parents. Shula played football in his neighborhood as a child, but his parents forbade it after he got a gash on his face when he was 11.

Shula had six siblings, including a set of triplets born in 1936. To meet the family's financial needs, his father obtained a job in the local fishing industry for $15 a week, and later worked at a rayon plant in nearby Painesville, Ohio. Shula attended elementary school at St. Mary's, a private Catholic school in Painesville; his mother was a devout Catholic, and his father converted to that denomination when they married.

== Playing career ==
Shula later attended Harvey High School in Painesville, Ohio, where he played on its football team starting in 1945. He did not try out for the team because of his mother's prohibition and because he was recovering from a bout of pneumonia, but an assistant football coach noticed him in a gym class and convinced him to join. Shula forged his parents' signatures to sign up.

Within weeks of joining Harvey's football team, Shula was a starting left halfback in the school's single-wing offense. He handled a large portion of the team's rushing and passing duties, and helped lead the team to a 7–3 win–loss record in his senior year. It was the first time in 18 years that Harvey High School had had a seven-win season. The team would have won a league title had it not lost an early game to Willoughby. He also ran the 440-yard dash at Harvey and was an 11-time letterman in his three years there.

=== John Carroll University ===
As Shula prepared to graduate from high school in 1947, many men whose football careers were delayed by service in World War II were returning and competing for college athletic scholarships. As a result, Shula was unable to get a scholarship and contemplated working for a year before going to college. That summer, however, he had a chance meeting at a gas station with former Painesville football coach Howard Bauchman, who suggested he ask about a scholarship at John Carroll University.

Shula received a one-year scholarship at the private Jesuit school in University Heights, a suburb of Cleveland. It was extended to a full scholarship after Shula performed well during his freshman year, including a victory over Youngstown State in October 1948. He ran for 175 yards and scored two touchdowns substituting for the injured starting halfback. The same year, Shula considered joining the Catholic priesthood after a three-day retreat at John Carroll, but decided against it because of his commitment to football.

During his senior year in 1950, he rushed for 125 yards in a win over a heavily favored Syracuse team.

=== Cleveland Browns ===
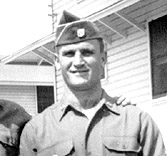
Shula served for 11 months in the Ohio Army National Guard in 1952 during the Korean War.

Shula graduated in 1951 as a sociology major with a minor in mathematics, and was offered a job teaching and coaching at Canton Lincoln High School in Canton, Ohio for $3,750 a year (equivalent to $47,000 in 2025). The Cleveland Browns of the National Football League, however, selected him 110th overall in the ninth round of the 1951 draft that January. Cleveland had won the NFL championship the previous year behind a staunch defense and an offense led by quarterback Otto Graham, fullback Marion Motley and end Dante Lavelli. Shula was joined in the Browns' training camp by John Carroll teammate Carl Taseff, whom Cleveland coach Paul Brown selected in the 22nd round. Brown made the selections in part because John Carroll coach Herb Eisele attended his coaching clinics and used similar schemes and terminology as Brown did. Shula and Taseff both made the team and were its only two rookies in 1951. Shula signed a $5,000-a-year contract and played as a defensive back alongside Warren Lahr and Tommy James.

Shula played in all 12 of Cleveland's games in 1951, making his first appearance as a starter in October, and recorded four interceptions. The Browns, meanwhile, finished with an 11–1 record and advanced to the championship game for a second straight year. The team lost the game 24–17 to the Los Angeles Rams in Los Angeles.

Shula was a member of an Ohio Army National Guard unit that was activated the following January during the Korean War. Military service in Ohio and at Fort Polk in Louisiana kept Shula away from football until the unit was deactivated that November. Returning to the Browns, Shula signed a $5,500-a-year contract and played in five games at the end of the season, having become a full-time starter because of injuries to other players. The Browns again advanced to the championship game and again lost, this time to the Detroit Lions.

=== Baltimore Colts ===
In early 1953, Brown traded Shula along with Taseff and eight other players to the Baltimore Colts in exchange for five Colts players including tackles Mike McCormack and Don Colo. Before joining Baltimore, Shula finished a master's degree in physical education at Case Western Reserve University in Cleveland.

Shula signed a $6,500-a-year contract with the Colts, which was preparing for its first season after relocating from Dallas, where the franchise had been called the Dallas Texans. The team replaced an earlier Colts franchise that folded after the 1950 season. The Colts finished with a 3–9 record in 1953 despite leading the NFL in defensive takeaways, including three interceptions by Shula. Baltimore continued to struggle the following year under new head coach Weeb Ewbank, a former Browns assistant. The team again finished 3–9 for last place in the NFL West, although Shula had a career-high five interceptions.

Shula had five interceptions again in 1955, but the Colts finished 5–6–1, well out of contention for the divisional championship. Shula missed the final three games of the season because of a broken jaw suffered in a 17–17 tie with the Los Angeles Rams. Ewbank brought in future Pro Football Hall of Fame quarterback Johnny Unitas as a backup in 1956, but the Colts posted a losing record even after Unitas became the starter partway through the season. Shula had just one interception that year.

The Colts waived Shula at the end of training camp in 1957 season, the last player cut as the team reduced its squad to 35 men, and the Washington Redskins picked him up. Shula spent one season with the Redskins before retiring. In his seven NFL seasons, he played in 73 games, intercepted 21 passes and recovered four fumbles.

== Coaching career ==
=== Early years (1958–1962) ===
Shula got his first coaching job shortly after ending his playing career, signing as a defensive backs coach at the University of Virginia under Dick Voris in February 1958. Virginia finished with a 1–9 record that year. Shula got married in the summer before the season to Dorothy Bartish, who grew up near Painesville. Shula and Bartish had begun dating after he graduated from John Carroll; she was working as a teacher in Hawaii when he proposed.

After one season at Virginia, Shula moved to another defensive backs coaching job at the University of Kentucky in 1959 under head coach Blanton Collier. Collier had been an assistant to Paul Brown when Shula played in Cleveland. After one season in Kentucky, Shula got his first NFL coaching job as the defensive backfield coach for the Detroit Lions in 1960. The Lions posted winning records in each of Shula's three seasons there under head coach George Wilson and finished in second place in the NFL West in 1961 and 1962. Detroit's defense was near the top of the league in fewest points allowed when Shula coached there, including a second-place finish in 1962. The defense also led the league that year in fewest yards allowed, with 3,217. Detroit's defense featured a group of linemen dubbed the "Fearsome Foursome" in 1962, consisting of defensive tackles Roger Brown and Alex Karras and defensive ends Darris McCord and Sam Williams.

=== Baltimore Colts (1963–1969) ===
Weeb Ewbank, under whom Shula had played in Cleveland and Baltimore, was fired as the Colts' head coach in 1963 following three disappointing seasons and disagreements over team strategy and organization with owner Carroll Rosenbloom. Rosenbloom immediately named Shula as the team's next head coach, having recruited him for the job earlier.

Shula was only 33 years old, making him the youngest coach in league history at the time, but Rosenbloom was familiar with his personality and approach from his playing days in Baltimore. While Rosenbloom said he realized he was "out on a limb" in hiring Shula, he felt it would bring a sense of team spirit back to the Colts. While Shula had only been an average player, he was "always... taking pictures, talking football", said Rosenbloom. "He had always wanted to coach".

Shula lost his first regular-season game, a September 15 matchup against the Giants. The 1963 Colts won their next game, however, and went on to finish the season with an 8–6 record for third place in the NFL West. The team was still led by Johnny Unitas, who was Shula's teammate during his final year as a player in Baltimore and had helped the Colts win championships in 1958 and 1959. The team's primary receivers were end Raymond Berry and tight end John Mackey, while defensive end Gino Marchetti anchored the defense.

Shula guided the team to a 12–2 record in his second year as coach. That put the Colts on top of the NFL West and earned them a spot in the NFL championship against the Browns, which by then were coached by Collier. The Colts were heavily favored to win even by sportswriters in Cleveland, due in large part to their strong receiving corps and Unitas, who had 2,824 passing yards and won the league's Most Valuable Player award. Halfback Lenny Moore also had 19 touchdowns, setting an NFL record. In addition to having the NFL's top-scoring offense, the Colts defense allowed the fewest points in the NFL. Before the championship, Collier said Shula had always thought about coaching even during his playing career, giving him "the experience of a man in the profession for ten years". The Colts, however, lost to the Browns 27–0 in the title game. Despite the loss, Shula won the NFL's Coach of the Year Award.

The Colts tied the Green Bay Packers with a 10–3–1 record at the end of the 1965 season, forcing a playoff to determine which of them would play in the championship game. The Colts had lost twice to the Packers during the regular season, and Unitas and backup Gary Cuozzo were sidelined by injuries as the playoffs approached. Baltimore got out to a 10–0 lead at halftime while using halfback Tom Matte at quarterback, but the Packers, coached by Vince Lombardi, made a comeback in the second half and tied the score at the end of regulation. The Colts stopped the Packers on their opening drive in the sudden-death overtime, but the ensuing drive ended with a missed field goal by placekicker Lou Michaels. The Packers then drove for a field goal of their own, winning 13–10. Shula said after the game that while his team could not expect to execute its usual strategy without Unitas and Cuozzo, the Colts "don't belong in this league" if they could not beat Green Bay once in three tries.

The Colts fell to second place in the NFL West the following season, the first year a Super Bowl was played between the NFL champion and the winner of the rival American Football League. In 1967, the Colts again failed to make the playoffs despite a regular-season record of 11–1–2, losing the newly created Coastal Division on a tiebreaker with the Los Angeles Rams because the Rams scored more points in the games between the two clubs. The Colts' only loss was a 34–10 setback to the Rams at the Los Angeles Memorial Coliseum on the final Sunday of the season. Though the season ended in disappointment, Shula won his second Coach of the Year award, and Unitas was again the league's MVP.

Before the 1968 season began, Unitas injured his elbow and was replaced by backup Earl Morrall. Expectations for Morrall were low, but the veteran quarterback led the Colts to a string of wins at the beginning of the season. Shula tried to ease Unitas back into the lineup, but the quarterback's injury flared up numerous times, culminating with a game against Cleveland in which he had just one completion and three interceptions. That turned out to be the only loss of the season for Baltimore, which finished with a league-leading 13–1 record. The Colts beat the Minnesota Vikings in the Western Conference championship game, and then beat the Browns 34–0 in the NFL Championship Game the following week. That set up a matchup with the New York Jets in Super Bowl III. The Jets were coached by Ewbank, and led by quarterback Joe Namath, who guaranteed a victory before the game despite being the underdog. New York won the game 16–7.

Shula spent one more season as the head coach of the Colts, who posted an 8–5–1 record in 1969 and missed the playoffs. He compiled a 71–23–4 record in seven seasons in Baltimore, but was just 2–3 in the postseason, including upset losses in the 1964 NFL Championship Game and Super Bowl III, where the Colts were heavy favorites.

Shula's 73 victories were the most in Colts history until 2007 when Tony Dungy surpassed him with his 74th win.

=== Miami Dolphins (1970–1995) ===
The relationship between Shula and Rosenbloom had soured after Shula's Super Bowl loss in 1969, and when Miami Dolphins owner Joe Robbie offered the coach a $70,000-a-year contract, the powers of general manager, and a 10% ownership stake in the AFL team after that season, he jumped at the opportunity. Rosenbloom cried foul at an NFL meeting in 1970 in Hawaii, alleging that Robbie's hiring of his coach violated the league's prohibition on tampering, or negotiating to hire other teams' employees without seeking permission. Shula and Robbie hoped that Shula's ownership stake and status as his own general manager would avoid tampering penalties under an exception for an employee leaving a club to "better himself". League commissioner Pete Rozelle found the Dolphins in violation of the tampering policy because they did not seek permission to negotiate and did not notify the Colts of the hiring before its announcement. As punishment, Rozelle awarded the Colts Miami's first-round pick in 1971.

The Dolphins had been one of the AFL's worst teams in the years leading up to Shula's hiring, which came as the AFL and NFL prepared to merge starting in the 1970 season. Between the team's founding in 1966 and the 1969 season, the Dolphins won no more than five games in any season under coach George Wilson.

Shula led Miami to immediate success, delivering a 10–4 win–loss record in the 1970 season and a 10–3–1 record the following year, when the team won the AFC championship but lost Super Bowl VI to the Dallas Cowboys by a score of 24–3. The team's stars included several future Pro Football Hall of Fame members: quarterback Bob Griese, fullback Larry Csonka, guard Larry Little, center Jim Langer, linebacker Nick Buoniconti and wide receiver Paul Warfield, whom Shula acquired from the Browns in 1970 for a first-round draft pick.

Shula's Miami teams during his first decade as coach were known for great offensive lines, led by Larry Little, Jim Langer, Bob Kuechenberg and Norm Evans, strong running games featuring Csonka, Jim Kiick, and Mercury Morris, quarterbacking by Griese and Earl Morrall and excellent receivers in Warfield, Howard Twilley and Jim Mandich. The Dolphins' defense was known as "The No-Name Defense", though it had a number of outstanding players, including defensive tackle Manny Fernandez, linebacker Nick Buoniconti, and safeties Dick Anderson and Jake Scott.

In 1972, Shula led Miami to the NFL's first and only perfect season, ending with a 17–0 record and a 14–7 victory in Super Bowl VII over the Washington Redskins. No other team has since equaled that feat; the 2007 Patriots went undefeated until losing to the New York Giants in the Super Bowl. Shula strung together the wins despite the loss of his quarterback, Griese, due to injury in the fifth game of the season. He was replaced by 38-year-old Earl Morrall, who had been the backup to Unitas during Shula's years in Baltimore. Griese was able to return for the playoffs, leading the team in the Super Bowl win. That season, Shula would also be the first American professional football coach to reach 100 wins in his first decade as a head coach.

Shula's 1973 team lost its second game of the season to the Oakland Raiders, ending an overall winning streak that stretched to 18 games. That run is tied for the third-longest in league history. The team finished with a 12–2 regular-season record and went on to win a second Super Bowl in a row, defeating the Minnesota Vikings 24–7.

The 1974 Dolphins had a chance to win a third title in a row, but they fell to the Oakland Raiders 28–26 in an AFC divisional playoff game. With 35 seconds remaining in the game, Oakland quarterback Ken Stabler was in the process of being sacked by Dolphins defensive end Vern Den Herder when, just before he was tackled, he completed a desperation forward pass to his running back Clarence Davis in the game's final moments — since dubbed The Sea of Hands play. The Dolphins team was decimated the following season by the creation of the now-defunct World Football League and their inability to match contract offers from the rival league to three of its star players: Csonka, Warfield and Jim Kiick. All three left to join the Memphis Southmen for the 1975 season.

Shula led the team to more winning seasons through the 1970s and into the 1980s, only posting a losing record once, in 1976 when the team finished 6–8. The team advanced to the playoffs in 1978, 1979 and 1981, but lost in the first round each time. The playoff loss in the 1981 season against the San Diego Chargers was a hard-fought back-and-forth battle that many sportswriters, players and coaches consider one of the greatest games ever played. Shula called it "maybe the greatest ever". The Chargers won the so-called Epic in Miami 41–38 with a field goal in double-overtime.

In 1982, Shula's team advanced through the playoffs to the Super Bowl during the strike-shortened season, but lost the championship to the Washington Redskins. The offense was led by David Woodley and Don Strock, who shared duties at quarterback following Griese's retirement after the 1980 season, and fullback Andra Franklin, who was second in the NFL in rushing. The defense, one of the best in the league, was nicknamed the "Killer Bees" because six starters' last names began with "B", including defensive tackle Bob Baumhower, linebacker Bob Brudzinski and safeties Lyle Blackwood and his brother Glenn Blackwood.

The 1983 season marked the beginning of a new era in Miami with the selection of quarterback Dan Marino out of the University of Pittsburgh in the first round of the NFL draft. Marino won the starting job halfway through the 1983 regular season, and by 1984, the Dolphins were back in the Super Bowl, due largely to Marino's record 5,084 yards through the air and 48 touchdown passes. The Dolphins, however, lost the game to the San Francisco 49ers, then led by quarterback Joe Montana.

Over the years, Shula's relationship with Robbie chilled considerably, in part due to Robbie's unwillingness to spend money on higher-profile players, which led to contract holdouts by Marino and linebacker John Offerdahl. Shula's power over the Dolphins as general manager and part-owner of the team also led to conflict that at times burst into public view. When Shula arrived late to a banquet celebrating Miami's 1974 Super Bowl win, Robbie ordered Shula to "get the hell into the room," to which Shula replied that he'd "knock you on your ass" if Robbie shouted at him again.

One of the few times Shula came close to leaving Miami was during the 1983 season, when Donald Trump, the owner of the New Jersey Generals in the upstart United States Football League, offered Shula a $1 million-a-year contract—a significant increase from the $450,000 Shula was earning at the time with the Dolphins. Trump said the negotiations were derailed when Shula insisted on obtaining a rent-free apartment at Trump Tower. Shula broke off the negotiations and called the courtship "a huge distraction", deciding to stay in Miami. Years later, Larry Csonka, by then an executive with the Jacksonville Bulls, said that he believed Shula would have taken the job with Trump's team, but he was angered at being "thrown out to the press" by Trump.

After the 1984 season, Shula's teams posted only one losing record, but they never again advanced to the Super Bowl. The Dolphins reached the playoffs in 1985, 1990, 1992, 1994, and 1995, Shula's final season. On October 2, 1994, Don Shula's Miami Dolphins defeated son David Shula's Cincinnati Bengals by a score of 23–7. Dubbed the “Shula Bowl”, it marked the first time in NFL history that a head coaching matchup featured father against son. Shula's retirement in 1996 was tinged by speculation that he was forced out by Wayne Huizenga, a businessman who took full ownership of the team in 1994 from the Robbie family, who inherited it after Robbie's death in 1990. Shula said he was "at peace with myself" in making the decision to step away from the game at 66 years old. He finished his coaching career with a 328–156–6 regular-season record, giving him the all-time lead in wins for an NFL head coach.

Shula changed his coaching strategy as his personnel changed. His Super Bowl teams in 1971, 1972, 1973, and 1982 were keyed by a run-first offensive strategy and a dominating defense. In the years when Marino was quarterback, the team leaned on its offense, and particularly its passing attack, to win games. "I've been accused of being a conservative, 'grind'em-out' kind of coach, because that was the style of my teams in 1972–73, but I point out that when I was at Baltimore, and Johnny Unitas was my quarterback, we used to have a wide-open, explosive passing attack," Shula said in 1985. "And when I came down to Miami, I didn't try to jam the Unitas style down the throat of Bob Griese, who was a different kind of quarterback, nor did I try to force the Griese style on Marino when he came along."

== Later life and death ==
Shula (right) poses for a photo with Alex Penelas (mayor of Miami-Dade) at Super Bowl XXXIII

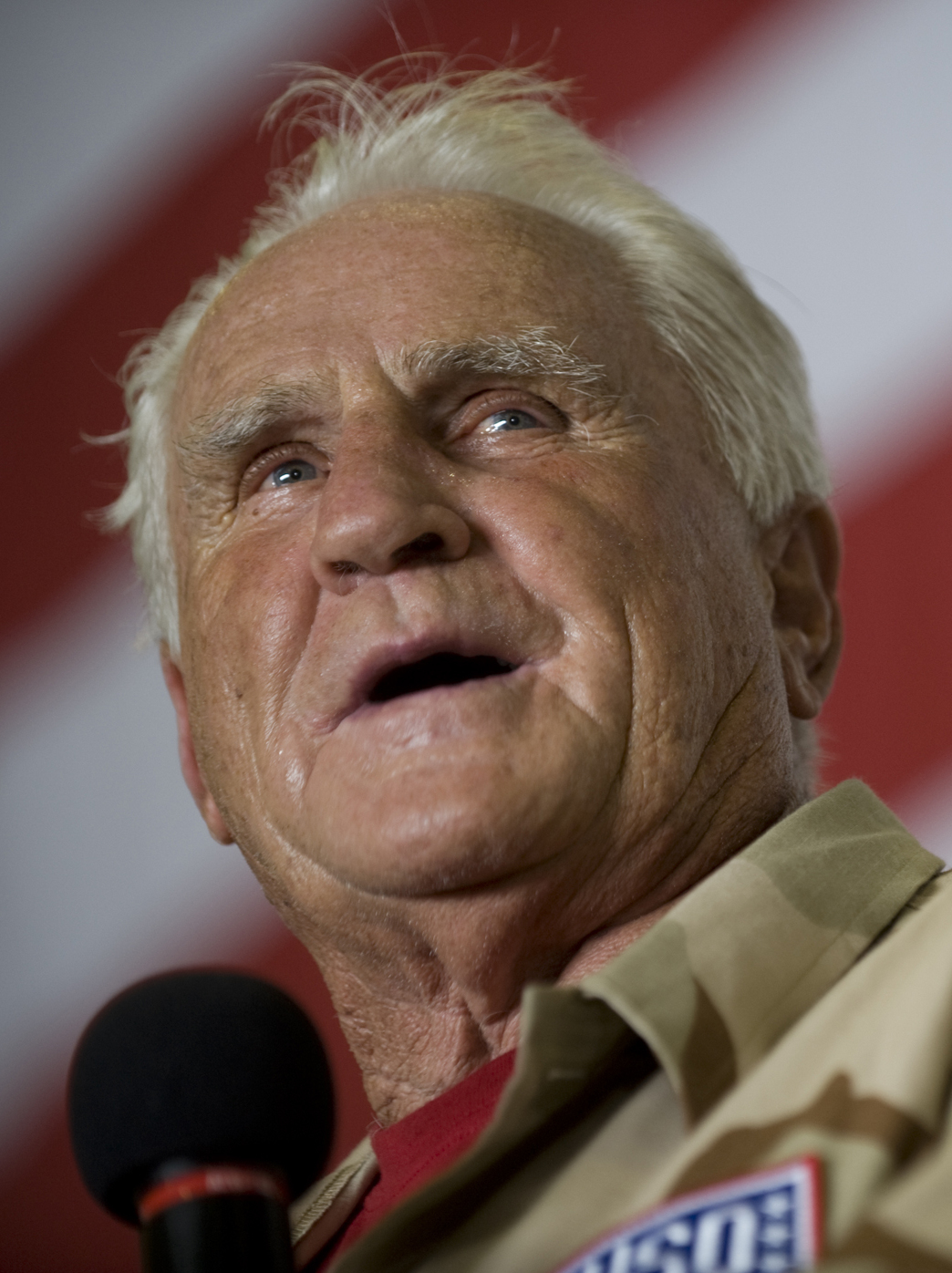
Shula in 2009

Shula entered the branding business in 1989, lending his name to a steakhouse owned by the wealthy Graham family, who became friends with Shula and his family after the Shulas moved to the Graham-developed suburb of Miami Lakes. Dozens of Shula-branded restaurants opened in the ensuing years, primarily in Florida, including steakhouses, burger restaurants and bars. Shula also put his name on other Graham-owned properties in 1991, including the family's hotel in Miami Lakes where his first steakhouse was located. It was renamed Don Shula's Hotel & Golf Club in exchange for an equity stake in the family's hospitality division. He remained active in the branding business during his retirement, and the company bearing his name expanded, although his son Dave assumed management of the firm during his later years.

Shula also became a frequent product promoter in his later years, working for Miami-based auto dealership Warren Henry, HearUSA hearing aids, NutriSystem diet plans, Humana health insurance and Budweiser beer, among others. In 2007, he joined his wife Mary Ann in promoting NutriSystem diets geared for people age 60 and older. "If it's something I feel fits into my personality, what I feel is important and what I actually do, then I'll do it. It's all things that I enjoy doing and take a lot of pride in representing," he said in 2012. As part of a government public awareness campaign, Shula was the first American to enroll in the Medicare Part D prescription drug plan, just after midnight on November 15, 2005.

After Shula's retirement, he was named the Dolphins' vice-chairman. He maintained other connections to football in retirement, often appearing in ceremonial roles. In 2003, at Super Bowl XXXVII in San Diego, he performed the ceremonial coin toss to end the pregame ceremonies. In 2007, at Super Bowl XLI in Miami Gardens, Shula took part in the Vince Lombardi Trophy presentation. On February 3, 2008, he attended Super Bowl XLII in Glendale, Arizona, in which the Patriots could have matched his Dolphins team's perfect season, but lost.

Shula was also an avid golfer after his coaching career and had a home near the Indian Creek Country Club in the wealthy enclave of Indian Creek, Florida, as well as a condominium overlooking the Links at Pebble Bay in Pebble Beach, California. On March 25, 2007, Shula presented the Winner's Cup to Tiger Woods, winner of the 2007 WGC-CA Golf Tournament held at the Doral Resort in Miami.

Shula was involved in a number of activities outside of sports. In 2011, he received the Ellis Island Medal of Honor in recognition of his humanitarian efforts. And at John Carroll University, he endowed the Don Shula Chair in Philosophy, which supports the Philosophy Department by presenting programs of interest to philosophers and the general public.

Shula suffered from sleep apnea and heart issues toward the end of his life, and had a pacemaker implanted in 2016. Shula died on May 4, 2020, at the age of 90 at his home in Indian Creek.

== Personal life ==
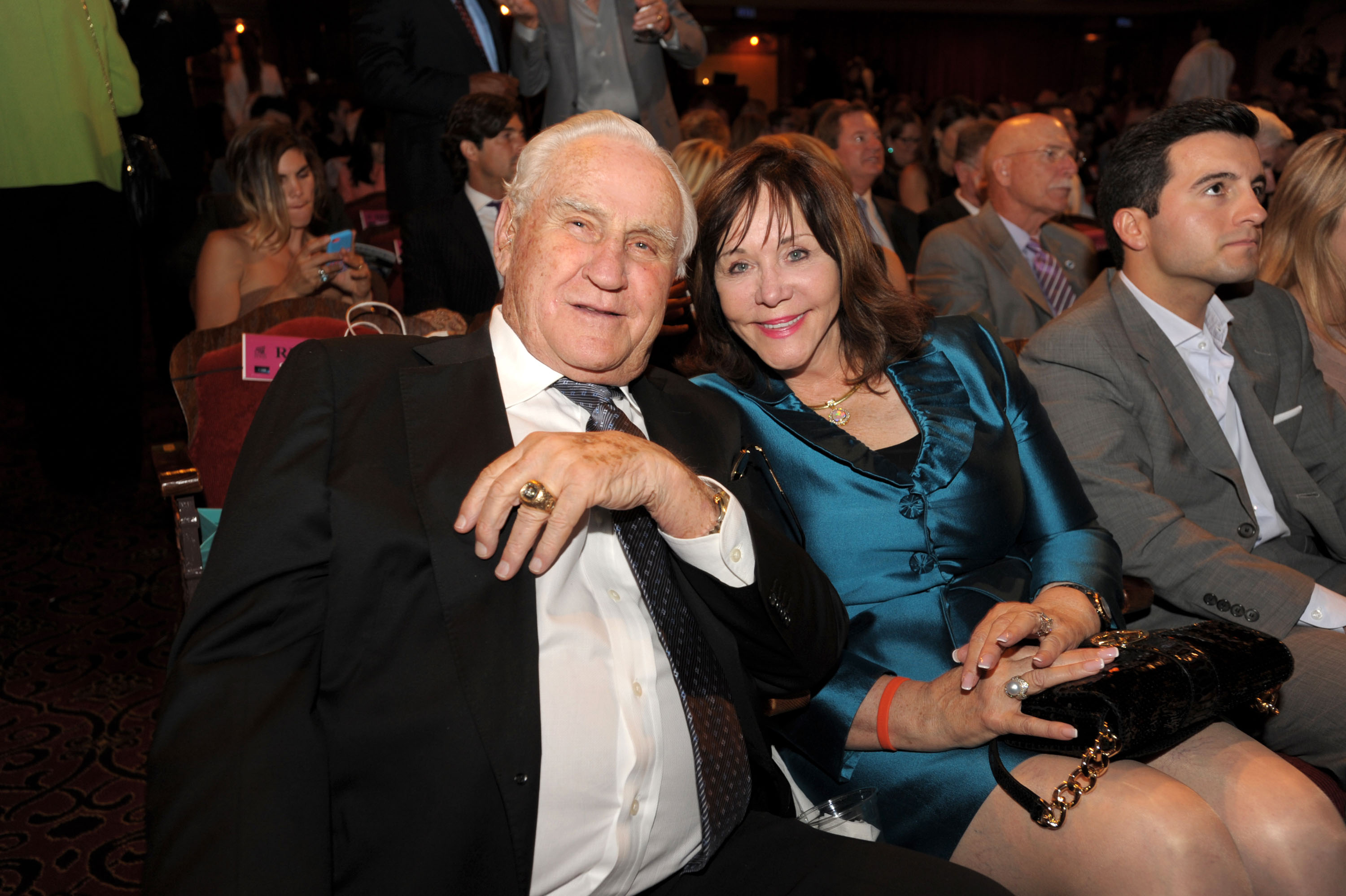
Don and Mary Anne Shula at the 2014 Miami International Film Festival

Shula married Painesville, Ohio native Dorothy Bartish, with whom he was in a relationship since high school, on July 19, 1958, after his playing career ended. They had five children: Dave (b. May 28, 1959), Donna (b. April 28, 1961), Sharon (b. June 30, 1962), Anne (b. May 7, 1964), and Mike (b. June 3, 1965). Dorothy died of breast cancer on February 25, 1991, aged 57. That same year, the Don Shula Foundation for Breast Cancer Research was founded.

He married his second wife, Mary Anne Stephens, on October 15, 1993. They resided in the Indian Creek home Mary Anne had received in her divorce settlement from her third husband, investment banker Jackson T. Stephens. The couple split their time between Indian Creek and a home in Pebble Beach where they stayed during Florida's hurricane season.

Shula was a devout Catholic throughout his life. He said in 1974, at the peak of his coaching career, that he attended Mass every morning. Shula once considered becoming a Catholic priest, but decided he could not commit to being both priest and coach.

== Legacy ==
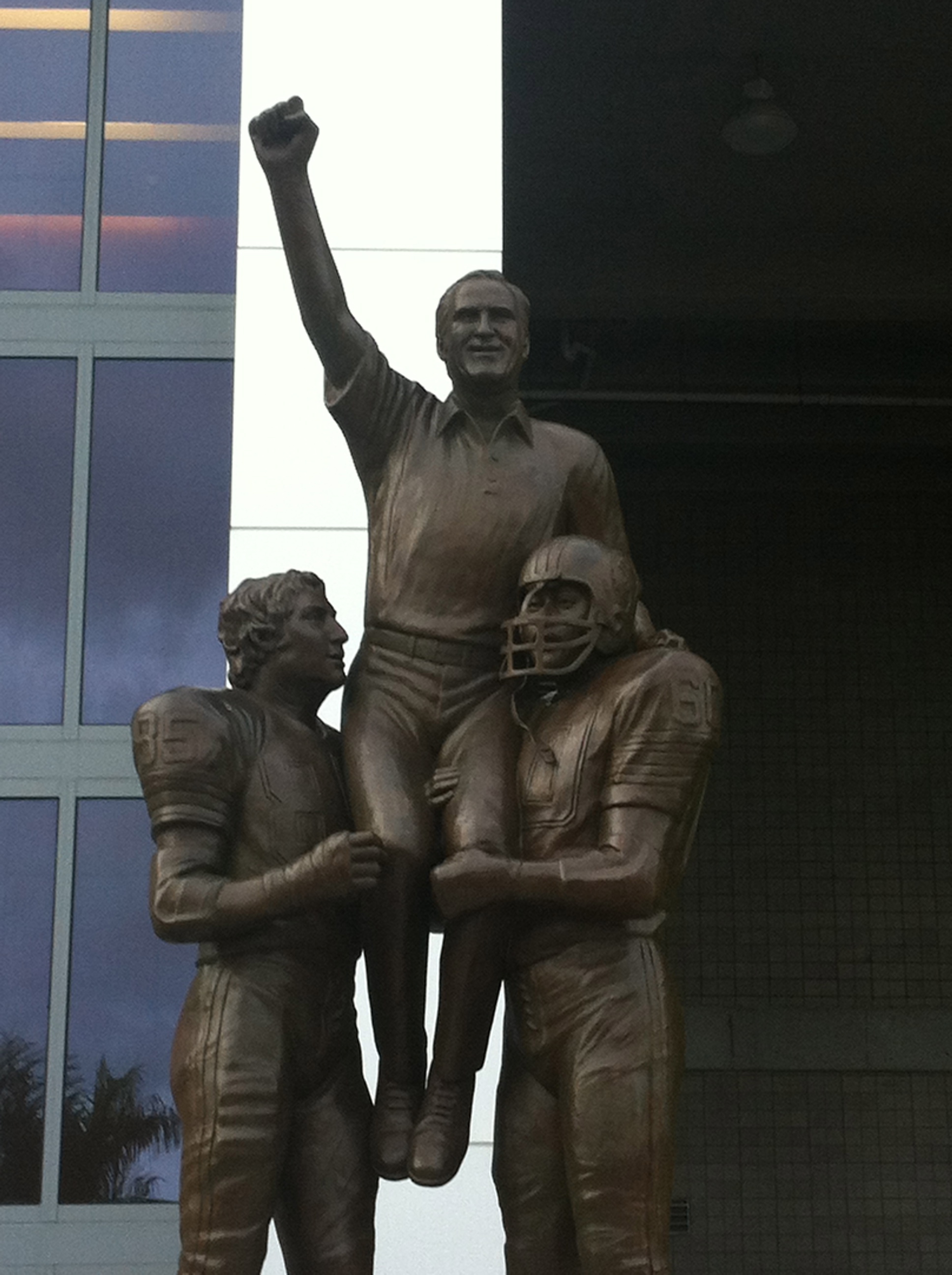
A statue of Shula outside of Hard Rock Stadium

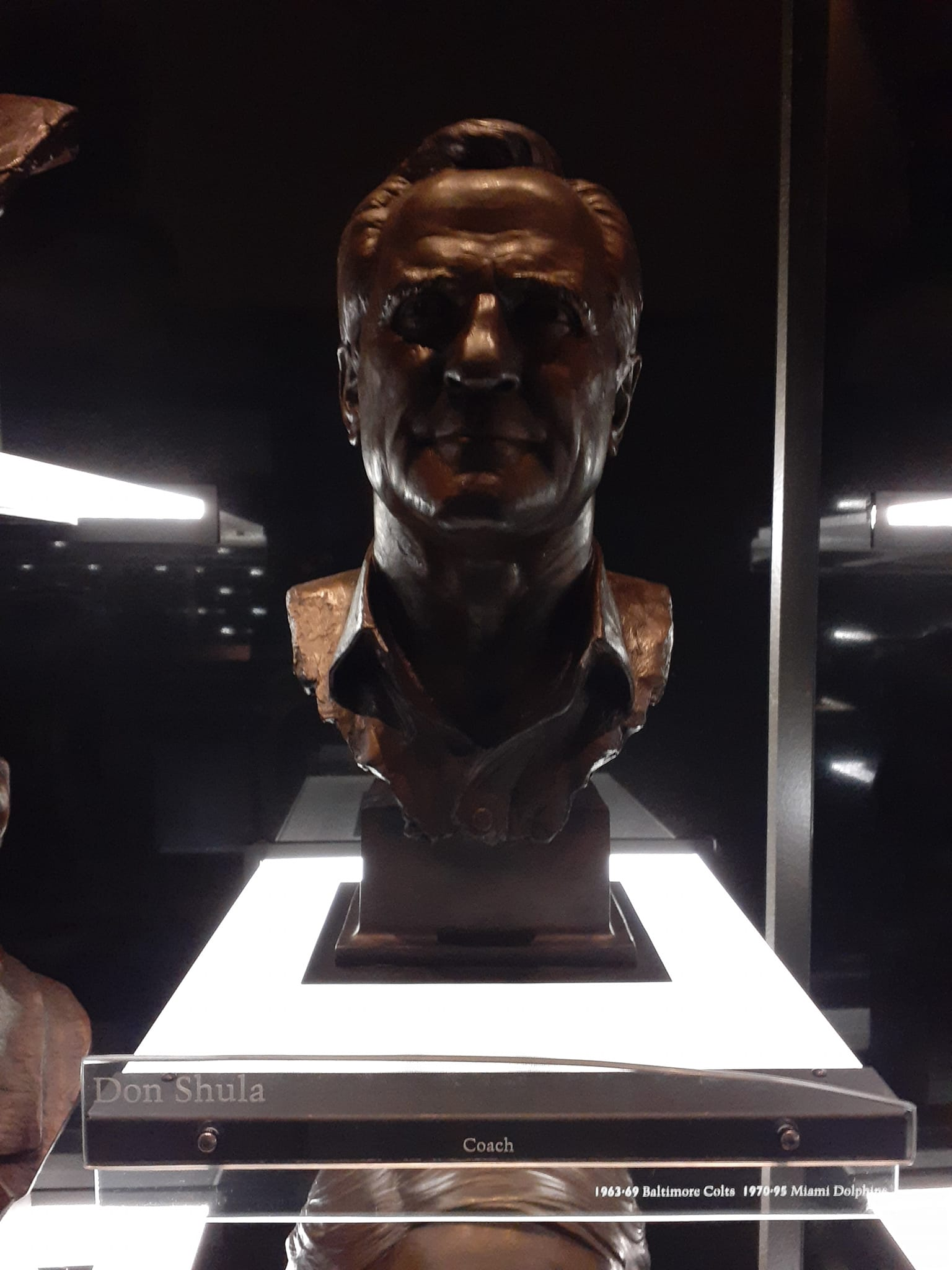
Shula's bronze bust at the Pro Football Hall of Fame

Shula set numerous records in his 33 seasons as a head coach. He is the all-time leader in victories with 347 when including the postseason. He is first in most games coached, with 526, most consecutive seasons coached, with 33, and Super Bowl losses with four, tied with Bud Grant, Dan Reeves, and Marv Levy. His teams won 15 division titles, six conference title wins, two NFL championships and six Super Bowl appearances.

Shula's teams were consistently among the least penalized in the NFL.

Shula was known as a tough and practical coach who worked players hard and put an emphasis on discipline, which helped reduce errors in games. However, while he looked the tough-guy part, Shula paired it with a sharp football mind that helped keep him ahead of the competition.

During the last 20 years of his coaching career, Shula served on the NFL's Competition Committee, an era when the body pushed through rules that made the league more pass-oriented.

Shula had a winning record against almost every coach he faced, with seven exceptions: Levy, against whom he was 6–14 during the regular season and 0–3 in the playoffs; John Madden, against whom he was 2–2 in the regular season and 1–2 in the playoffs for a total of 3–4; and Bill Cowher, against whom Shula was 1–2 late in his career. Shula also had losing records against Tom Flores (1–6) Raymond Berry (3–8), Walt Michaels (5–7–1), and Vince Lombardi (5–8).

Shula has the distinction of having coached five different quarterbacks to Super Bowl appearances: Johnny Unitas and Earl Morrall in 1968, Bob Griese in 1971, 1972, and 1973, David Woodley in 1982, and Dan Marino in 1984, three of them future Hall of Famers. He also coached Johnny Unitas to another World Championship appearance in the pre-Super Bowl era in 1964. The only other NFL coach to approach this distinction is Joe Gibbs, who coached four Super Bowls with three different quarterbacks — Joe Theismann, Doug Williams, and Mark Rypien — winning three times.

Shula was added to the Miami Dolphin Honor Roll on November 25, 1996, not long after he retired. He was inducted into the Pro Football Hall of Fame in 1997, in his first year of eligibility. In 1999, Shula was honored with the "Lombardi Award of Excellence" from the Vince Lombardi Cancer Foundation. The award was created to honor coach Vince Lombardi's legacy, and is given annually to an individual who exemplifies the spirit of the coach. On January 31, 2010, a statue of him was unveiled at Hard Rock Stadium, where the Dolphins play. The stadium's street address is 347 Don Shula Drive, making reference to his career win total. In 2011, he was added to a Walk of Fame outside the stadium, and in 2013 he attended a White House ceremony honoring the 1972 team's perfect season.

Shula is honored at the Don Shula Stadium at John Carroll University, which was named after him when it opened in 2003, and the Don Shula Expressway in Miami, which was dedicated in 1983. Since 2002, an annual college football game between South Florida schools Florida Atlantic and FIU is named the Shula Bowl in his honor. The game's winner receives a traveling trophy named the Don Shula Award.

== Literary works ==
Shula co-authored three books: The Winning Edge (1973) with Lou Sahadi ISBN 0-525-23500-0, Everyone's a Coach (1995) ISBN 0-310-20815-7, and The Little Black Book of Coaching: Motivating People to be Winners (2001); ISBN 0-06-662103-8, both with Ken Blanchard (author of The One Minute Manager).

== Head coaching record ==
Don Shula NFL coaching record
Team	Year	Regular season					Postseason			
Team	Year	Won	Lost	Ties	Win %	Finish	Won	Lost	Win %	Result
BAL	1963	8	6	0	.571	3rd in Western Conference	—			
BAL	1964	12	2	0	.857	1st in Western Conference	0	1	.000	Lost to Cleveland Browns in NFL Championship Game
BAL	1965	10	3	1	.769	2nd in Western Conference	0	1	.000	Lost to Green Bay Packers in Western Conference Playoff
BAL	1966	9	5	0	.643	2nd in Western Conference	—			
BAL	1967	11	1	2	.917	2nd in Coastal Division	—			
BAL	1968	13	1	0	.929	1st in Coastal Division	2	1	.667	Won 1968 NFL Championship. Lost to New York Jets in Super Bowl III
BAL	1969	8	5	1	.615	2nd in Coastal Division	—			
BAL Total		71	23	4	.755		2	3	.400	
MIA	1970	10	4	0	.714	2nd in AFC East	0	1	.000	Lost to Oakland Raiders in AFC Divisional Game
MIA	1971	10	3	1	.769	1st in AFC East	2	1	.667	Lost to Dallas Cowboys in Super Bowl VI
MIA	1972	14	0	0	1.000	1st in AFC East	3	0	1.000	Super Bowl VII champions
MIA	1973	12	2	0	.857	1st in AFC East	3	0	1.000	Super Bowl VIII champions
MIA	1974	11	3	0	.786	1st in AFC East	0	1	.000	Lost to Oakland Raiders in AFC Divisional Game
MIA	1975	10	4	0	.714	2nd in AFC East	—			
MIA	1976	6	8	0	.429	3rd in AFC East	—			
MIA	1977	10	4	0	.714	2nd in AFC East	—			
MIA	1978	11	5	0	.688	2nd in AFC East	0	1	.000	Lost to Houston Oilers in AFC wild card game
MIA	1979	10	6	0	.625	1st in AFC East	0	1	.000	Lost to Pittsburgh Steelers in AFC Divisional Game
MIA	1980	8	8	0	.500	3rd in AFC East	—			
MIA	1981	11	4	1	.719	1st in AFC East	0	1	.000	Lost to San Diego Chargers in AFC Divisional Game
MIA	1982*	7	2	0	.778	1st in AFC East	3	1	.750	Lost to Washington Redskins in Super Bowl XVII
MIA	1983	12	4	0	.750	1st in AFC East	0	1	.000	Lost to Seattle Seahawks in AFC Divisional Game
MIA	1984	14	2	0	.875	1st in AFC East	2	1	.667	Lost to San Francisco 49ers in Super Bowl XIX
MIA	1985	12	4	0	.750	1st in AFC East	1	1	.500	Lost to New England Patriots in AFC Championship Game
MIA	1986	8	8	0	.500	3rd in AFC East	—			
MIA	1987	8	7	0	.533	3rd in AFC East	—			
MIA	1988	6	10	0	.375	5th in AFC East	—			
MIA	1989	8	8	0	.500	2nd in AFC East	—			
MIA	1990	12	4	0	.750	2nd in AFC East	1	1	.500	Lost to Buffalo Bills in AFC Divisional Game
MIA	1991	8	8	0	.500	3rd in AFC East	—			
MIA	1992	11	5	0	.688	1st in AFC East	1	1	.500	Lost to Buffalo Bills in AFC Championship Game
MIA	1993	9	7	0	.563	2nd in AFC East	—			
MIA	1994	10	6	0	.625	1st in AFC East	1	1	.500	Lost to San Diego Chargers in AFC Divisional Game
MIA	1995	9	7	0	.563	3rd in AFC East	0	1	.000	Lost to Buffalo Bills in AFC Wild Card Game
MIA Total		257	133	2	.659		17	14	.548	
Total		328	156	6	.677		19	17	.528	

- 57-day long players' strike reduced the 1982 season from a 16-game schedule per team to 9

== Coaching tree ==
Shula worked under three head coaches:

- Dick Voris, Virginia (1958)
- Blanton Collier, Kentucky (1959)
- George Wilson, Detroit Lions (1960–1962)

Nine of Shula's assistant coaches have become NFL or NCAA head coaches:

- Don McCafferty, Baltimore Colts (1970–1972), Detroit Lions (1973)
- Bill Arnsparger, New York Giants (1974–1976), LSU (1984–1986)
- Chuck Noll, Pittsburgh Steelers (1969–1991)
- Howard Schnellenberger, Baltimore Colts (1973–1974), University of Miami (1979–1983), Louisville (1985–1994), Oklahoma (1995), Florida Atlantic (2001–2011)
- Monte Clark, San Francisco 49ers (1976), Detroit Lions (1978–1984)
- Wally English, Tulane (1983–1984)
- Dan Henning, Atlanta Falcons (1983–1986), San Diego Chargers (1989–1991), Boston College (1994–1996)
- Dave Shula, Cincinnati Bengals (1992–1996)
- Mike Shula, Alabama (2003–2006)

Four of Shula's former players have become NFL or NCAA head coaches:

- Ray Perkins, New York Giants (1979–1982), Alabama (1983–1986)
- Doug Marrone, Syracuse (2009–2012), Buffalo Bills (2013–2014), Jacksonville Jaguars (2016, interim, 2017–2020)
- Doug Pederson, Philadelphia Eagles (2016–2020), Jacksonville Jaguars (2022–2024)
- Don Strock, Florida International University 2002–2006

Four of Shula's executives became general managers in the NFL:

- Bobby Beathard, Miami Dolphins (1972–1977), Washington Redskins (1978–1988), San Diego Chargers (1990–2000)
- Kevin Colbert, Pittsburgh Steelers (2000–2021)
- Tom Heckert Jr., Philadelphia Eagles (2006–2009), Cleveland Browns (2010–2012)
- Jason Licht, Tampa Bay Buccaneers (2014–present)

== See also ==
- List of National Football League head coaches with 50 wins
- List of National Football League head coaches with 200 wins
- List of Super Bowl head coaches
