= List of Boston College Eagles football seasons =

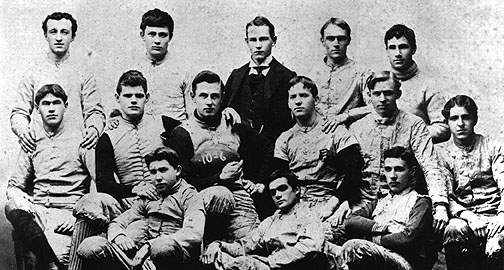
The 1893 Boston College football team.

The Boston College Eagles college football team competes as part of the National Collegiate Athletic Association (NCAA) Division I Football Bowl Subdivision, representing Boston College in the Atlantic Coast Conference (ACC). Boston College has played their home games at Alumni Stadium in Chestnut Hill, Massachusetts since 1957. Boston College claims one national championship in 1940, though the NCAA doesn't recognize it, and have played in 29 Bowl Games, winning 15. With 701 wins over 125 seasons of football, Boston College ranks 53rd all-time in win–loss records in the NCAA. Boston College played as an Independent until joining the Big East Conference in 1991. Boston College later joined the Atlantic Coast Conference in 2005.

== Seasons ==
Year	Coach	Overall	Conference	Standing	Bowl/playoffs	Coaches^{#}	AP^{°}
Joseph Drum (Independent) (1893)
1893	Boston College	3–3					
William Nagle (Independent) (1894)
1894	Boston College	1–6					
Joseph Lawless (Independent) (1895)
1895	Boston College	2–4–2					
Frank Carney (Independent) (1896)
1896	Boston College	5–2					
John Dunlop (Independent) (1897–1901)
1897	Boston College	4–3					
1898	Boston College	2–5–1					
1899	Boston College	8–1–1					
1900	No team						
1901	Boston College	2–7					
Arthur White (Independent) (1902)
1902	Boston College	0–8					
1903–07	No team						
Joe Kenney & Joe Reilly (Independent) (1908)
1908	Boston College	2–4–2					
Thomas H. Maguire (Independent) (1909)
1909	Boston College	3–4–1					
Hub Hart (Independent) (1910)
1910	Boston College	0–4–2					
Joseph Courtney (Independent) (1911)
1911	Boston College	0–7					
William Joy (Independent) (1912–1913)
1912	Boston College	2–4–1					
1913	Boston College	4–3–1					
Stephen Mahoney (Independent) (1914–1915)
1914	Boston College	5–4					
1915	Boston College	3–4					
Charles Brickley (Independent) (1916–1917)
1916	Boston College	6–2					
1917	Boston College	6–2					
Frank Morrissey (Independent) (1918)
1918	Boston College	5–2					
Frank Cavanaugh (Independent) (1919–1926)
1919	Boston College	5–3					
1920	Boston College	8–0					
1921	Boston College	4–3–1					
1922	Boston College	6–2–1					
1923	Boston College	7–1–1					
1924	Boston College	6–3					
1925	Boston College	6–2					
1926	Boston College	6–0–2					
D. Leo Daley (Independent) (1927)
1927	Boston College	4–4					
Joe McKenney (Independent) (1928–1924)
1928	Boston College	9–0					
1929	Boston College	7–2–1					
1930	Boston College	5–5					
1931	Boston College	6–4					
1932	Boston College	4–2–2					
1933	Boston College	8–1					
1934	Boston College	5–4					
Dinny McNamara (Independent) (1935)
1935	Boston College (Note: Harry Downes coached the last five games of the season after McNamara resigned.)	6–3					
Gil Dobie (Independent) (1936–1938)
1936	Boston College	6–1–2					
1937	Boston College	4–4–1					
1938	Boston College	6–1–2					
Frank Leahy (Independent) (1939–1940)
1939	Boston College	9–2			L Cotton		
1940	Boston College	11–0			W Sugar		5
Denny Myers (Independent) (1941–1942)
1941	Boston College	7–3					
1942	Boston College	8–2			L Orange		8
Moody Sarno (Independent) (1943–1945)
1943	Boston College	4–0–1					
1944	Boston College	4–3					
1945	Boston College	4–5					
Denny Myers (Independent) (1946–1950)
1946	Boston College	6–3					
1947	Boston College	5–4					
1948	Boston College	5–2–2					
1949	Boston College	4–4–1					
1950	Boston College	0–9–1					
Mike Holovak (Independent) (1951–1959)
1951	Boston College	3–6					
1952	Boston College	4–4–1					
1953	Boston College	5–3–1					
1954	Boston College	8–1					
1955	Boston College	5–2–1					
1956	Boston College	5–4					
1957	Boston College	7–2					
1958	Boston College	7–3					
1959	Boston College	5–4					
Ernie Hefferle (Independent) (1960–1961)
1960	Boston College	3–6–1					
1961	Boston College	4–6					
Jim Miller (Independent) (1962–1967)
1962	Boston College	8–2					
1963	Boston College	6–3					
1964	Boston College	6–3					
1965	Boston College	6–4					
1966	Boston College	4–6					
1967	Boston College	4–6					
Joe Yukica (Independent) (1968–1977)
1968	Boston College	6–3					
1969	Boston College	5–4					
1970	Boston College	8–2					
1971	Boston College	9–2					
1972	Boston College	4–7					
1973	Boston College	7–4					
1974	Boston College	8–3					
1975	Boston College	7–4					
1976	Boston College	8–3					
1977	Boston College	6–5					
Ed Chlebek (Independent) (1978–1980)
1978	Boston College	0–11					
1979	Boston College	5–6					
1980	Boston College	7–4					
Jack Bicknell (Independent) (1981–1990)
1981	Boston College	5–6					
1982	Boston College	8–3–1			L Tangerine		
1983	Boston College	9–3			L Liberty	20	19
1984	Boston College	10–2			W Cotton	4	5
1985	Boston College	4–8					
1986	Boston College	9–3			W Hall of Fame	18	19
1987	Boston College	5–6					
1988	Boston College	3–8					
1989	Boston College	2–9					
1990	Boston College	4–7					
Tom Coughlin (Big East Conference) (1991–1993)
1991	Boston College	4–7	2–4	(Note: The Big East did not crown an official champion until 1993 when full league play began.)			
1992	Boston College	8–3–1	2–1–1		L Hall of Fame	21	21
1993	Boston College	9–3	5–2	3rd	W Carquest	12	13
Dan Henning (Big East Conference) (1994–1996)
1994	Boston College	7–4–1	3–3–1	5th	W Aloha	22	23
1995	Boston College	4–8	4–3	T–4th			
1996	Boston College	5–7	2–5	6th			
Tom O'Brien (Big East Conference) (1997–2004)
1997	Boston College	4–7	3–4	T–5th			
1998	Boston College	4–7	3–4	5th			
1999	Boston College	8–4	4–3	3rd	L Insight.com		
2000	Boston College	7–5	3–4	T–5th	W Aloha		
2001	Boston College	8–4	4–3	T–3rd	W Music City	23	21
2002	Boston College	9–4	3–4	T–4th	W Motor City		
2003	Boston College	8–5	3–4	5th	W Emerald		
2004	Boston College	9–3	4–2	T–1st	W Continental Tire	21	21
Tom O'Brien (Atlantic Coast Conference) (2005–2006)
2005	Boston College	9–3	5–3	T–1st (Atlantic)	W MPC Computers	17	18
2006	Boston College (Note: O'Brien coached the first 12 games of the season before resigning to become head coach at NC State. Frank Spaziani coached Boston College in Meineke Car Care.)	10–3	5–3	T–2nd (Atlantic)	W Meineke Car Care	20	20
Jeff Jagodzinski (Atlantic Coast Conference) (2007–2008)
2007	Boston College	11–3	6–2	1st (Atlantic)	W Champs Sports	11	10
2008	Boston College	9–5	5–3	1st (Atlantic)	L Music City		
Frank Spaziani (Atlantic Coast Conference) (2009–2012)
2009	Boston College	8–5	5–3	2nd (Atlantic)	L Emerald		
2010	Boston College	7–6	4–4	T–4th (Atlantic)	L Fight Hunger		
2011	Boston College	4–8	3–5	5th (Atlantic)			
2012	Boston College	2–10	1–7	6th (Atlantic)			
Steve Addazio (Atlantic Coast Conference) (2013–2019)
2013	Boston College	7–6	4–4	T–3rd (Atlantic)	L Independence		
2014	Boston College	7–6	4–4	4th (Atlantic)	L Pinstripe		
2015	Boston College	3–9	0–8	7th (Atlantic)			
2016	Boston College	7–6	2–6	T–6th (Atlantic)	W Quick Lane		
2017	Boston College	7–6	4–4	T–3rd (Atlantic)	L Pinstripe		
2018	Boston College	7–5	4–4	4th (Atlantic)	CX First Responder (Note: The First Responder Bowl was cancelled due to inclement weather and ruled a no contest.)		
2019	Boston College (Note: The team was led by seventh-year head coach Steve Addazio until his dismissal on December 1, 2019. For their bowl game, the Eagles were led by interim head coach Rich Gunnell.)	6–7	4–4	T–3rd (Atlantic)	L Birmingham		
Jeff Hafley (Atlantic Coast Conference) (2020–2023)
2020	Boston College	6–5	5–5	T–6th	(Note: Despite being bowl eligible, Boston College was the first of many NCAA programs to withdraw from postseason participation, due to concerns over the COVID-19 pandemic.)		
2021	Boston College	6–6	2–6	T–6th (Atlantic)	CX Military (Note: The Military Bowl was cancelled the day before it was scheduled due to positive COVID-19 cases in the Boston College program.)		
2022	Boston College	3–9	2–6	7th (Atlantic)			
2023	Boston College	7–6	3–5	T–9th	W Fenway		
Bill O'Brien (Atlantic Coast Conference) (2024–present)
2024	Boston College	7–6	4–4	T–8th	L Pinstripe		
2025	Boston College	2–10	1–7	T–16th			
Total:		703–541–37					
National championship Conference title Conference division title or championship game berth
^{†}Indicates Bowl Coalition, Bowl Alliance, BCS, or CFP / New Years' Six bowl.; ^{#}Rankings from final Coaches Poll.; ^{°}Rankings from final AP Poll.
