= List of Boston College Eagles head football coaches =

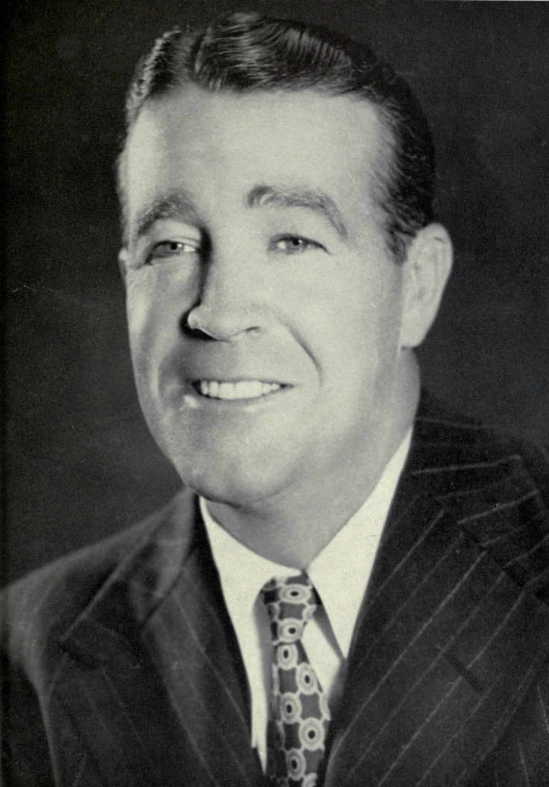
Frank Leahy has the highest all time winning percentage as head coach at Boston College.

The Boston College Eagles college football team represents Boston College in the Atlantic Division of the Atlantic Coast Conference (ACC). The Eagles compete as part of the NCAA Division I Football Bowl Subdivision. The program has had 40 head coaches, and two interim head coaches, since it began play during the 1893 season. Since February 2024, Bill O'Brien and Sterling has served as head coach at Boston College.

Ten coaches have led Boston College in postseason bowl games: Frank Leahy, Denny Myers, Jack Bicknell, Tom Coughlin, Dan Henning, Tom O'Brien, Jeff Jagodzinski, Frank Spaziani, Steve Addazio, and Rich Gunnell. O'Brien also won one conference championship as a member of the Big East Conference.

Joe Yukica, Bicknell, and O'Brien are the leaders in seasons coached 10 years each as head coach. O'Brien has the most all-time wins with 75 and Leahy has the highest winning percentage at 0.909. Arthur White and Joseph Courtney has the lowest winning percentage of those who have coached more than one game, with 0.000. Of the 40 different head coaches who have led the Eagles, Frank Cavanaugh, Gil Dobie, Leahy, and Mike Holovak have been inducted into the College Football Hall of Fame.

== Key ==
Key to symbols in coaches list
| General | | Overall | | Conference | | Postseason (Note: Although the first Rose Bowl Game was played in 1902, it has been continuously played since the 1916 game, and is recognized as the oldest bowl game by the NCAA. "—" indicates any season prior to 1916 when postseason games were not played.) | |
|---|---|---|---|---|---|---|---|
| No. | Order of coaches (Note: A running total of the number of head coaches, with coaches who served separate tenures being counted only once. Interim head coaches are represented with "Int" and are not counted in the running total. "—" indicates the team played but either without a coach or no coach is on record. "X" indicates an interim year without play.) | GC | Games coached | CW | Conference wins | PW | Postseason wins |
| DC | Division championships | OW | Overall wins | CL | Conference losses | PL | Postseason losses |
| CC | Conference championships | OL | Overall losses | CT | Conference ties | PT | Postseason ties |
| NC | National championships | OT | Overall ties (Note: Overtime rules in college football were introduced in 1996, making ties impossible in the period since.) | C% | Conference winning percentage | | |
| † | Elected to the College Football Hall of Fame | O% | Overall winning percentage (Note: When computing the win–loss percentage, a tie counts as half a win and half a loss.) | | | | |

== Coaches ==
List of head football coaches showing season(s) coached, overall records, conference records, postseason records, championships and selected awards (Note: Statistics correct as of the end of the 2025 NCAA Division I FBS football season.)
| No. | Name | Season(s) (Note: Boston College did not field teams for the 1900 or 1903–1907 seasons.) | GC | OW | OL | OT | O% | CW | CL | CT | C% | PW | PL | PT | CC | NC | Awards |
|---|---|---|---|---|---|---|---|---|---|---|---|---|---|---|---|---|---|
| 1 | Joseph Drum | 1893 | 6 | 3 | 3 | 0 | 0.500 | — | — | — | — | — | — | — | — | — | — |
| 2 | William Nagle | 1894 | 7 | 1 | 6 | 0 | 0.143 | — | — | — | — | — | — | — | — | — | — |
| 3 | Joseph Lawless | 1895 | 8 | 2 | 4 | 2 | 0.375 | — | — | — | — | — | — | — | — | — | — |
| 4 | Frank Carney | 1896 | 7 | 5 | 2 | 0 | 0.714 | — | — | — | — | — | — | — | — | — | — |
| 5 | John Dunlop | 1897–1899; 1901 | 34 | 16 | 16 | 2 | 0.500 | — | — | — | — | — | — | — | — | — | — |
| 6 | Arthur White | 1902 | 8 | 0 | 8 | 0 | .000 | — | — | — | — | — | — | — | — | — | — |
| 7 | Joe Kenney Joe Reilly (Note: Joe Kenney and Joe Reilly served as co-head coaches for the 1908 season.) | 1908 | 8 | 2 | 4 | 2 | 0.375 | — | — | — | — | — | — | — | — | — | — |
| 8 | Thomas H. Maguire | 1909 | 8 | 3 | 4 | 1 | 0.438 | — | — | — | — | — | — | — | — | — | — |
| 9 | Hub Hart | 1910 | 6 | 0 | 4 | 2 | 0.167 | — | — | — | — | — | — | — | — | — | — |
| 10 | Joseph Courtney | 1911 | 7 | 0 | 7 | 0 | .000 | — | — | — | — | — | — | — | — | — | — |
| 11 | William Joy | 1912–1913 | 15 | 6 | 7 | 2 | 0.467 | — | — | — | — | — | — | — | — | — | — |
| 12 | Stephen Mahoney | 1914–1915 | 16 | 8 | 8 | 0 | 0.500 | — | — | — | — | — | — | — | — | — | — |
| 13 | Charles Brickley | 1916–1917 | 16 | 12 | 4 | 0 | 0.750 | — | — | — | — | — | — | — | — | — | — |
| 18 | Frank Morrissey | 1918 | 7 | 5 | 2 | 0 | 0.714 | — | — | — | — | — | — | — | — | — | — |
| 19 | Frank Cavanaugh^{†} | 1919–1926 | 67 | 48 | 14 | 5 | 0.754 | — | — | — | — | — | — | — | — | — | — |
| 20 | D. Leo Daley | 1927 | 8 | 4 | 4 | 0 | 0.500 | — | — | — | — | — | — | — | — | — | — |
| 21 | Joe McKenney | 1928–1934 | 65 | 44 | 18 | 3 | 0.700 | — | — | — | — | — | — | — | — | — | — |
| 22 | Dinny McNamara | 1935 | 4 | 3 | 1 | 0 | 0.750 | — | — | — | — | — | — | — | — | — | — |
| Int. | Harry Downes (Note: Downes served as interim head coach after the resignation of Dinny McNamara for the final five games of the 1935 season.) | 1935 | 5 | 3 | 2 | 0 | 0.600 | — | — | — | — | — | — | — | — | — | — |
| 23 | Gil Dobie^{†} | 1936–1938 | 27 | 16 | 6 | 5 | 0.685 | — | — | — | — | — | — | — | — | — | — |
| 24 | Frank Leahy^{†} | 1939–1940 | 22 | 20 | 2 | 0 | 0.909 | — | — | — | — | 1 | 1 | 0 | — | — | — |
| 25; 27 | Denny Myers | 1941–1942; 1946–1950 | 66 | 35 | 27 | 4 | 0.561 | — | — | — | — | 0 | 1 | 0 | — | — | — |
| 26 | Moody Sarno | 1943–1945 | 19 | 11 | 7 | 1 | 0.605 | — | — | — | — | 0 | 0 | 0 | — | — | — |
| 28 | Mike Holovak^{†} | 1951–1959 | 81 | 49 | 29 | 3 | 0.625 | — | — | — | — | 0 | 0 | 0 | — | — | — |
| 29 | Ernie Hefferle | 1960–1961 | 20 | 7 | 12 | 1 | 0.375 | — | — | — | — | 0 | 0 | 0 | — | — | — |
| 30 | Jim Miller | 1962–1967 | 58 | 34 | 24 | 0 | 0.586 | — | — | — | — | 0 | 0 | 0 | — | — | — |
| 31 | Joe Yukica | 1968–1977 | 105 | 68 | 37 | 0 | 0.648 | — | — | — | — | 0 | 0 | 0 | — | — | — |
| 32 | Ed Chlebek | 1978–1980 | 33 | 12 | 21 | 0 | 0.364 | — | — | — | — | 0 | 0 | 0 | — | — | — |
| 33 | Jack Bicknell | 1981–1990 | 115 | 59 | 55 | 1 | 0.517 | — | — | — | — | 2 | 2 | 0 | — | — | — |
| 34 | Tom Coughlin | 1991–1993 | 35 | 21 | 13 | 1 | 0.614 | 9 | 7 | 1 | 0.559 | 1 | 1 | 0 | 0 | — | — |
| 35 | Dan Henning | 1994–1996 | 35 | 21 | 13 | 1 | 0.614 | 9 | 11 | 1 | 0.452 | 1 | 0 | 0 | 0 | — | — |
| 36 | Tom O'Brien | 1997–2006 | 120 | 75 | 45 | — | 0.625 | 37 | 34 | — | 0.521 | 7 | 1 | — | 1 | — | — |
| 37 | Jeff Jagodzinski | 2007–2008 | 28 | 20 | 8 | — | 0.714 | 11 | 5 | — | 0.688 | 1 | 1 | — | 0 | — | — |
| 38 | Frank Spaziani (Note: Spaziani served as interim head coach after the resignation of Tom O'Brien for the 2006 Meineke Car Care Bowl.) | 2006; 2009–2012 | 51 | 22 | 29 | — | 0.431 | 13 | 19 | — | 0.406 | 1 | 2 | — | 0 | — | — |
| 39 | Steve Addazio | 2013–2019 | 88 | 44 | 44 | — | 0.500 | 22 | 34 | — | 0.393 | 1 | 3 | — | 0 | — | — |
| Int. | Rich Gunnell (Note: Gunnell served as interim head coach after Steve Addazio was fired for the 2020 Birmingham Bowl.) | 2019 | 1 | 0 | 1 | — | .000 | 0 | 0 | — | – | 0 | 1 | — | 0 | — | — |
| 40 | Jeff Hafley | 2020–2023 | 48 | 22 | 26 | — | 0.458 | 12 | 22 | — | 0.353 | 1 | 0 | — | 0 | — | — |
| 41 | Bill O'Brien | 2024–present | 25 | 9 | 16 | — | 0.360 | 5 | 11 | — | 0.313 | 0 | 1 | — | 0 | — | — |
