= List of Virginia Cavaliers head football coaches =

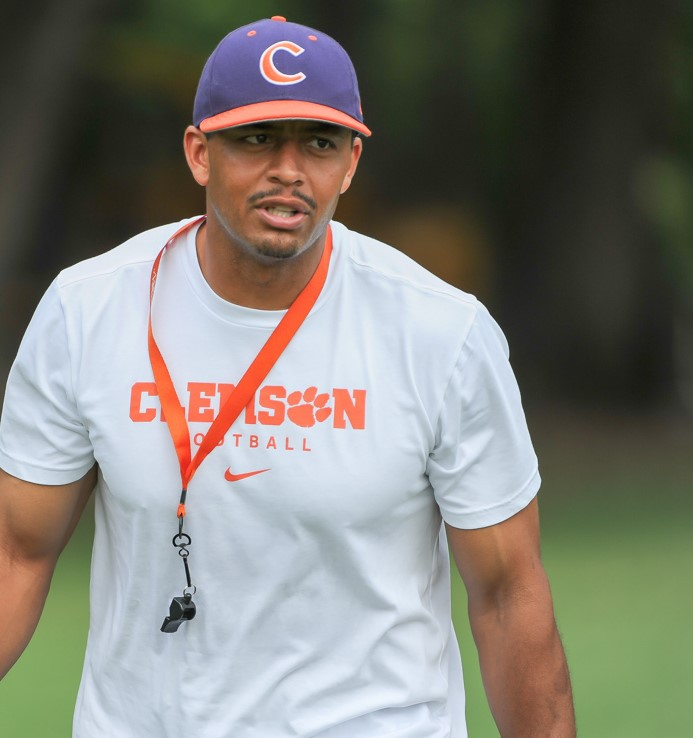
Tony Elliott is the current head coach of the Cavaliers.

The Virginia Cavaliers college football team represents the University of Virginia in the Atlantic Coast Conference (ACC). The Cavaliers compete as part of the NCAA Division I Football Bowl Subdivision. The program has had 42 head coaches since it began play during the 1887 season. Since December 2021, Tony Elliott has served as head coach at Virginia.

Four coaches have led Virginia in postseason bowl games: George Welsh, Al Groh, Mike London, and Bronco Mendenhall. Three of those coaches also won conference championships: Joseph M. Wood and Harry Varner each captured one as a member of the South Atlantic Intercollegiate Athletic Association; and Welsh captured two as a member of the Atlantic Coast Conference.

Welsh is the leader in overall wins and seasons coached with 134 wins during his 19 years as head coach. Merritt Cooke Jr. has the highest winning percentage at 0.938. Dick Voris has the lowest winning percentage of those who have coached more than one game, with 0.033. Of the 42 different head coaches who have led the Cavaliers, George Sanford, Greasy Neale, Earl Abell, Frank Murray, and Welsh has been inducted into the College Football Hall of Fame.

== Key ==
Key to symbols in coaches list
General		Overall		Conference		Postseason (Note: Although the first Rose Bowl Game was played in 1902, it has been continuously played since the 1916 game, and is recognized as the oldest bowl game by the NCAA. "—" indicates any season prior to 1916 when postseason games were not played.)	
No.	Order of coaches (Note: A running total of the number of head coaches, with coaches who served separate tenures being counted only once. Interim head coaches are represented with "Int" and are not counted in the running total. "—" indicates the team played but either without a coach or no coach is on record. "X" indicates an interim year without play.)	GC	Games coached	CW	Conference wins	PW	Postseason wins
DC	Division championships	OW	Overall wins	CL	Conference losses	PL	Postseason losses
CC	Conference championships	OL	Overall losses	CT	Conference ties	PT	Postseason ties
NC	National championships	OT	Overall ties (Note: Overtime rules in college football were introduced in 1996, making ties impossible in the period since.)	C%	Conference winning percentage		
†	Elected to the College Football Hall of Fame	O%	Overall winning percentage (Note: When computing the win–loss percentage, a tie counts as half a win and half a loss.)				

== Coaches ==
List of head football coaches showing season(s) coached, overall records, conference records, postseason records, championships and selected awards (Note: Statistics correct as of the end of the 2025 NCAA Division I FBS football season.)
No.	Name (Note: Virginia did not have a head coach from the 1887–1891 seasons.)	Season(s) (Note: Virginia did not field a team from the 1917–1918 seasons.)	GC	OW	OL	OT	O%	CW	CL	CT	C%	PW	PL	PT	CC	NC	Awards
1	William C. Spicer	1892	6	3	2	1	0.583	—	—	—	—	—	—	—	—	—	—
2	Johnny Poe	1893–1894	21	16	5	0	0.762	—	—	—	—	—	—	—	—	—	—
3	Harry Arista Mackey	1895	11	9	2	0	0.818	—	—	—	—	—	—	—	—	—	—
4	Martin V. Bergen	1896–1897	20	13	4	3	0.725	—	—	—	—	—	—	—	—	—	—
5	Joseph Massie	1898	12	6	6	0	0.500	—	—	—	—	—	—	—	—	—	—
6	Archie Hoxton	1899–1900	19	11	5	3	0.658	—	—	—	—	—	—	—	—	—	—
7	Westley Abbott	1901	10	8	2	0	0.800	—	—	—	—	—	—	—	—	—	—
8	John de Saulles	1902	10	8	1	1	0.850	—	—	—	—	—	—	—	—	—	—
9	Gresham Poe	1903	10	7	2	1	0.750	—	—	—	—	—	—	—	—	—	—
10	George Sanford^{†}	1904	9	6	3	0	0.667	—	—	—	—	—	—	—	—	—	—
11	William C. "King" Cole	1905–1906	20	12	6	2	0.650	—	—	—	—	—	—	—	—	—	—
12	Hammond Johnson	1907	10	6	3	1	0.611	—	—	—	—	—	—	—	—	—	—
13	Merritt Cooke Jr.	1908	8	7	0	1	0.938	—	—	—	—	—	—	—	—	—	—
14	John Neff	1909	8	7	1	0	0.875	—	—	—	—	—	—	—	—	—	—
15	Charles B. Crawford	1910	8	6	2	0	0.750	—	—	—	—	—	—	—	—	—	—
16	Kemper Yancey	1911	10	8	2	0	0.800	2	1	0	0.667	—	—	—	0	—	—
17	John S. Elliott	1912	9	6	3	0	0.667	1	1	0	0.500	—	—	—	0	—	—
18; 23	W. Rice Warren	1913; 1920–1921	26	17	7	2	0.692	9	3	0	0.750	—	—	—	0	—	—
19	Joseph M. Wood	1914	9	8	1	0	0.889	3	0	0	1.000	—	—	—	1	—	—
20	Harry Varner	1915	9	8	1	0	0.889	2	0	0	1.000	—	—	—	1	—	—
21	Peyton Evans	1916	9	4	5	0	0.444	3	1	0	0.750	—	—	—	0	—	—
22	Harris Coleman	1919	9	2	5	2	0.333	1	1	1	0.500	—	—	—	0	—	—
24	Thomas J. Campbell	1922	9	4	4	1	0.500	1	1	1	0.500	—	—	—	0	—	—
25	Greasy Neale^{†}	1923–1928	55	28	22	5	0.555	16	18	3	0.473	—	—	—	0	—	—
26	Earl Abell^{†}	1929–1930	19	8	9	2	0.474	3	8	2	0.308	—	—	—	0	—	—
27	Fred Dawson	1931–1933	29	8	17	4	0.345	3	11	2	0.250	—	—	—	0	—	—
28	Gus Tebell	1934–1936	28	6	18	4	0.286	1	7	2	0.200	—	—	—	0	—	—
29	Frank Murray^{†}	1937–1945	80	41	34	5	0.544	—	—	—	—	—	—	—	—	—	—
30	Art Guepe	1946–1952	66	47	17	2	0.727	—	—	—	—	—	—	—	—	—	—
31	Ned McDonald	1953–1955	28	5	23	0	0.179	0	6	0	.000	—	—	—	0	—	—
32	Ben Martin	1956–1957	20	6	13	1	0.325	3	8	0	0.273	—	—	—	0	—	—
33	Dick Voris	1958–1960	30	1	29	0	0.033	1	16	0	0.059	—	—	—	0	—	—
34	Bill Elias	1961–1964	40	16	23	1	0.413	4	18	1	0.196	—	—	—	0	—	—
35	George Blackburn	1965–1970	61	28	33	0	0.459	13	23	0	0.361	—	—	—	0	—	—
36	Don Lawrence	1971–1973	33	11	22	0	0.333	6	11	0	0.353	—	—	—	0	—	—
37	Sonny Randle	1974–1975	22	5	17	0	0.227	1	9	0	0.100	—	—	—	0	—	—
38	Dick Bestwick	1976–1981	66	16	49	1	0.250	5	28	0	0.152	—	—	—	0	—	—
39	George Welsh^{†}	1982–2000	223	134	86	3	0.608	85	51	3	0.622	4	8	0	2	—	—
40	Al Groh	2001–2009	113	59	54	—	0.522	36	36	—	0.500	3	2	—	0	—	—
41	Mike London	2010–2015	73	27	46	—	0.370	14	34	—	0.292	0	1	—	0	—	—
42	Bronco Mendenhall	2016–2021	74	36	38	—	0.486	22	27	—	0.449	1	2	—	0	—	—
43	Tony Elliott	2022–present	48	22	26	—	0.458	13	18	—	0.419	1	0	—	0	—	—
