= List of Florida Atlantic Owls head football coaches =

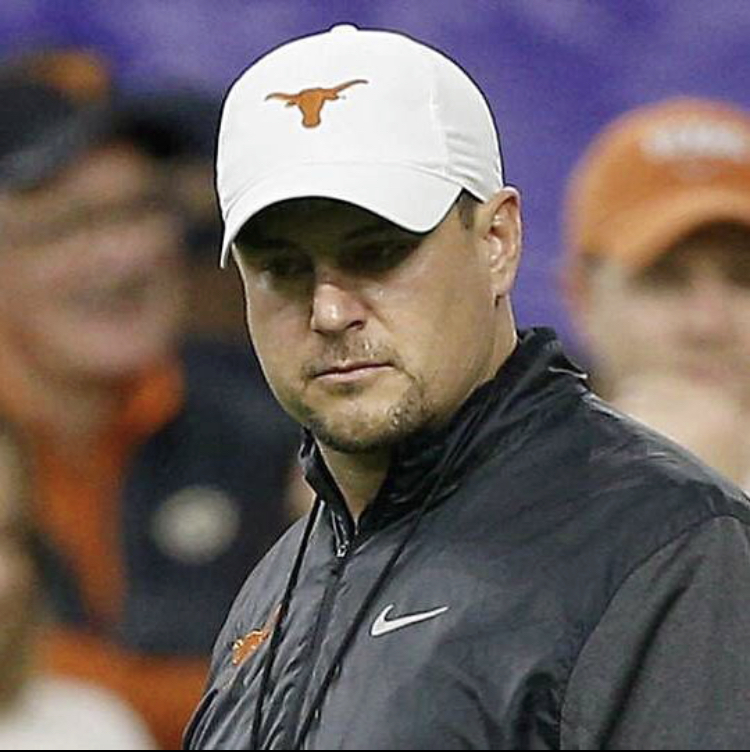
Tom Herman, Florida Atlantic's head coach from 2023 to 2024

The Florida Atlantic Owls football team represents Florida Atlantic University in college football at the NCAA Division I Football Bowl Subdivision (FBS) level as a member of the American Athletic Conference (AAC). The program has had seven head coaches, and three interim head coaches, since it began play during the 2001 season. The current head coach of the Owls is Zach Kittley, who was hired in December 2024.

Through the 2025 season, Florida Atlantic has played 301 games over 24 seasons. Four head coaches have led the Owls in postseason bowl games: Howard Schnellenberger, Lane Kiffin, Glenn Spencer, and Willie Taggart. Florida Atlantic has a 4–1 record in bowl games. The Owls have won three conference championships. Schellenberger's 2007 team shared the Sun Belt Conference titles. Kiffin's 2017 team and 2019 team won C-USA titles.

Schellenberger spent the most seasons (11) as the Owl's head coach and has the most wins (58) and most losses (74) in program history. Kiffin, who led the Florida Atlantic to a record of 27–13 from 2017 to 2019, has the highest winning percentage (.675) of any non-interim coach. The lowest winning percentage for any Florida Atlantic coach is Charlie Partridge, who compiled a record of 9–27 (.250) from 2014 to 2016.

Kiffin led the Owls to two bowl appearances, the first a 50–3 win over Akron in the 2017 Boca Raton Bowl. Kiffin's 2019 team was invited to the 2019 Boca Raton Bowl. Led by interim head coach Glenn Spencer, the Owls won a 52–28 win over SMU. Kiffin left to become the head coach of Ole Miss before the 2019 bowl game.

== Key ==
Key to symbols in coaches list
| General | | Overall | | Conference | | Postseason (Note: Although the first Rose Bowl Game was played in 1902, it has been continuously played since the 1916 game, and is recognized as the oldest bowl game by the NCAA. "—" indicates any season prior to 1916 when postseason games were not played.) | |
|---|---|---|---|---|---|---|---|
| No. | Order of coaches (Note: A running total of the number of head coaches, with coaches who served separate tenures being counted only once. Interim head coaches are represented with "Int" and are not counted in the running total. "—" indicates the team played but either without a coach or no coach is on record. "X" indicates an interim year without play.) | GC | Games coached | CW | Conference wins | PW | Postseason wins |
| DC | Division championships | OW | Overall wins | CL | Conference losses | PL | Postseason losses |
| CC | Conference championships | OL | Overall losses | CT | Conference ties | PT | Postseason ties |
| NC | National championships | OT | Overall ties (Note: Overtime rules in college football were introduced in 1996, making ties impossible in the period since.) | C% | Conference winning percentage | | |
| † | Elected to the College Football Hall of Fame | O% | Overall winning percentage (Note: When computing the win–loss percentage, a tie counts as half a win and half a loss.) | | | | |

== List of head coaches ==
List of head football coaches showing season(s) coached, overall records, conference records, postseason records, championships and selected awards (Note: Statistics correct as of the end of the 2025 NCAA Division I FBS football season.)
| No. | Name | Term | GC | OW | OL | O% | CW | CL | C% | PW | PL | DC (Note: Florida Atlantic has competed as a member of the East Division of the CUSA.) | CC | NC |
|---|---|---|---|---|---|---|---|---|---|---|---|---|---|---|
| 1 | Howard Schnellenberger | 2001–2011 | 132 | 58 | 74 | 0.439 | 22 | 23 | 0.488 | 2 | 0 | — | 1 | 0 |
| 2 | Carl Pelini | 2012–2013 | 20 | 5 | 15 | 0.250 | 3 | 10 | 0.230 | 0 | 0 | 0 | 0 | 0 |
| Int. | Brian Wright | 2013 | 4 | 4 | 0 | 1.000 | 3 | 0 | 1.000 | 0 | 0 | 0 | 0 | 0 |
| 3 | Charlie Partridge | 2014–2016 | 36 | 9 | 27 | 0.250 | 7 | 17 | 0.292 | 0 | 0 | 0 | 0 | 0 |
| 4 | Lane Kiffin | 2017–2019 | 40 | 27 | 13 | 0.675 | 18 | 6 | 0.750 | 1 | 0 | 2 | 2 | 0 |
| Int. | Glenn Spencer | 2019 | 1 | 1 | 0 | 1.000 | 0 | 0 | .000 | 1 | 0 | 0 | 0 | 0 |
| 5 | Willie Taggart | 2020–2022 | 33 | 15 | 18 | 0.455 | 11 | 11 | 0.500 | 0 | 1 | 0 | 0 | 0 |
| 6 | Tom Herman | 2023–2024 | 22 | 6 | 16 | 0.273 | 3 | 9 | 0.250 | 0 | 0 | 0 | 0 | 0 |
| Int. | Chad Lunsford (Note: Chad Lunsford was named interim head coach for the final two games of the 2024 season, following the firing of Tom Herman as head coach.) | 2024 | 2 | 1 | 1 | 0.500 | 1 | 1 | 0.500 | 0 | 0 | 0 | 0 | 0 |
| 7 | Zach Kittley | 2025–present | 12 | 4 | 8 | 0.333 | 3 | 5 | 0.375 | 0 | 0 | 0 | 0 | 0 |
