= List of Louisville Cardinals head football coaches =

The Louisville Cardinals football team represents the University of Louisville in the sport of American football. The Cardinals compete in the Football Bowl Subdivision (FBS) of the National Collegiate Athletic Association (NCAA) and are currently a member of the Atlantic Coast Conference. The team's current head coach is newly introduced Jeff Brohm. Brohm was introduced on December 8, 2022. The previous head coach was Scott Satterfield.

The Louisville Cardinals have played in 962 games since their inaugural 1912 season. The Cardinals have appeared in 20 bowl games and have claimed 8 conference championships. Louisville competes against the University of Kentucky Wildcats in the annual "Governor's Cup" rivalry game. Six coaches have led the Cardinals to the postseason since 1912.

== Key ==
Key to symbols in coaches list
General		Overall		Conference		Postseason (Note: Although the first Rose Bowl Game was played in 1902, it has been continuously played since the 1916 game, and is recognized as the oldest bowl game by the NCAA. "—" indicates any season prior to 1916 when postseason games were not played.)	
No.	Order of coaches (Note: A running total of the number of head coaches, with coaches who served separate tenures being counted only once. Interim head coaches are represented with "Int" and are not counted in the running total. "—" indicates the team played but either without a coach or no coach is on record. "X" indicates an interim year without play.)	GC	Games coached	CW	Conference wins	PW	Postseason wins
DC	Division championships	OW	Overall wins	CL	Conference losses	PL	Postseason losses
CC	Conference championships	OL	Overall losses	CT	Conference ties	PT	Postseason ties
NC	National championships	OT	Overall ties (Note: Overtime rules in college football were introduced in 1996, making ties impossible in the period since.)	C%	Conference winning percentage		
†	Elected to the College Football Hall of Fame	O%	Overall winning percentage (Note: When computing the win–loss percentage, a tie counts as half a win and half a loss.)				

== Coaches ==
List of head football coaches showing season(s) coached, overall records, conference records, postseason records, championships and selected awards (Note: Statistics correct as of the end of the 2025 NCAA Division I FBS football season.)
No.	Name	Season(s) (Note: Louisville did not field a team for the 1917–1920 and 1943–1945 seasons.)	GC	OW	OL	OT	O%	CW	CL	CT	C%	PW	PL	PT	CC	NC	Awards
1	Lester Larson	1912–1913	10	8	2	0	0.800	—	—	—	—	—	—	—	—	—	—
2	Bruce Baker	1914	5	1	4	0	0.200	—	—	—	—	—	—	—	—	—	—
3	Will Duffy	1915–1916	13	3	8	2	0.308	—	—	—	—	—	—	—	—	—	—
4	Bill Duncan	1921–1922	14	4	9	1	0.321	—	—	—	—	—	—	—	—	—	—
5	Fred Enke	1923–1924	17	8	8	1	0.500	4	2	0	0.667	—	—	—	0	—	—
6	Tom King	1925–1930	48	27	21	0	0.563	7	12	0	0.368	—	—	—	0	—	—
7	Jack McGrath	1931	8	0	8	0	.000	0	5	0	.000	—	—	—	0	—	—
8	C. V. Money	1932	9	0	9	0	.000	0	5	0	.000	—	—	—	0	—	—
9	Ben Cregor	1933–1935	23	4	18	1	0.196	4	13	0	0.235	—	—	—	0	—	—
10	Laurie Apitz	1936–1942	54	22	29	3	0.435	5	13	2	0.300	—	—	—	0	—	—
11	Frank Camp	1946–1968	215	118	95	2	0.553	16	20	0	0.444	1	0	0	1	—	—
12	Lee Corso	1969–1972	42	28	11	3	0.702	13	6	0	0.684	0	0	1	2	—	—
13	T. W. Alley	1973–1974	22	9	13	0	0.409	6	4	0	0.600	0	0	0	0	—	—
14	Vince Gibson	1975–1979	56	25	29	2	0.464	—	—	—	—	0	1	0	—	—	—
15	Bob Weber	1980–1984	55	20	35	0	0.364	—	—	—	—	0	0	0	—	—	—
16	Howard Schnellenberger	1985–1994	112	54	56	2	0.491	—	—	—	—	2	0	0	—	—	—
17	Ron Cooper	1995–1997	33	13	20	0	0.394	2	9	0	0.182	0	0	0	0	—	—
18	John L. Smith	1998–2002	62	41	21	—	0.661	25	9	—	0.735	1	4	—	2	—	—
19; 22	Bobby Petrino	2003–2006; 2014–2018	112	77	35	—	0.688	45	24	—	0.652	3	5	—	2	—	—
20	Steve Kragthorpe	2007–2009	36	15	21	—	0.417	5	16	—	0.238	0	0	—	0	—	—
21	Charlie Strong	2010–2013	52	37	15	—	0.712	20	9	—	0.690	3	1	—	2	—	—
Int.	Lorenzo Ward	2018	2	0	2	—	.000	0	1	—	.000	0	0	—	0	—	—
23	Scott Satterfield	2019–2022	49	25	24	—	0.510	15	18	—	0.455	1	1	—	0	—	ACC Coach of the Year (2019)
Int.	Deion Branch	2022	1	1	0	—	1.000	0	0	—	–	1	0	—	0	—	—
24	Jeff Brohm	2023–present	40	28	12	—	0.700	16	8	—	0.667	2	1	—	0	—	—
