= List of Syracuse Orange head football coaches =

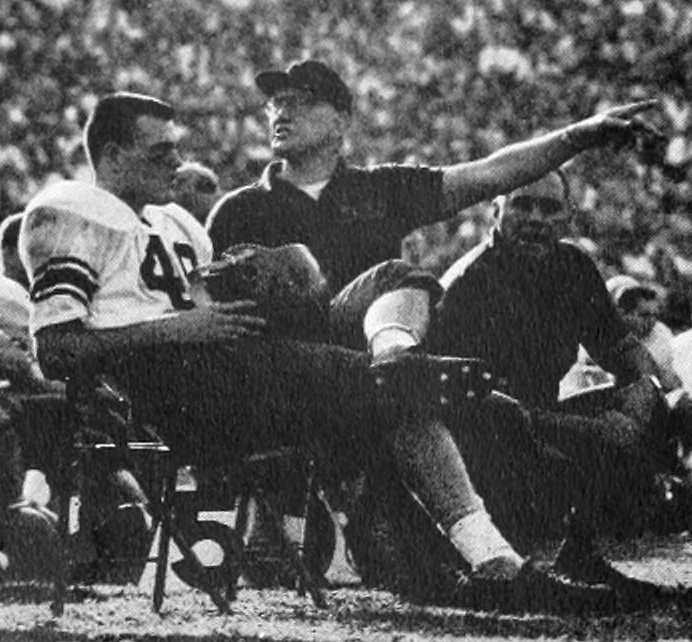
Ben Schwartzwalder has the most wins as head coach at Syracuse.

The Syracuse Orange college football team represents the Syracuse University in the Atlantic Coast Conference (ACC). The Orange compete as part of the NCAA Division I Football Bowl Subdivision. The program has had 31 head coaches since it began play during the 1887 season. Fran Brown the current head coach was hired in December of 2023.

Eight coaches have led Syracuse in postseason bowl games: Ben Schwartzwalder, Frank Maloney, Dick MacPherson, Paul Pasqualoni, Doug Marrone, Scott Shafer, Dino Babers, and Fran Brown. Two of those coaches also won conference championships: Pasqualoni captured four and Marrone one as a member of the Big East Conference.

Schwartzwalder is the leader in overall wins and seasons coached with 153 wins during his 25 years as head coach. Pete Reynolds has the highest winning percentage at 0.800. Jordan C. Wells has the lowest winning percentage at 0.056. Of the 30 different head coaches who have led the Orange, Frank "Buck" O'Neill, Howard Jones, Tad Jones, Bill Hollenback, Vic Hanson, Biggie Munn, Schwartzwalder, and MacPherson has been inducted into the College Football Hall of Fame.

== Key ==
Key to symbols in coaches list
General		Overall		Conference		Postseason (Note: Although the first Rose Bowl Game was played in 1902, it has been continuously played since the 1916 game, and is recognized as the oldest bowl game by the NCAA. "—" indicates any season prior to 1916 when postseason games were not played.)	
No.	Order of coaches (Note: A running total of the number of head coaches, with coaches who served separate tenures being counted only once. Interim head coaches are represented with "Int" and are not counted in the running total. "—" indicates the team played but either without a coach or no coach is on record. "X" indicates an interim year without play.)	GC	Games coached	CW	Conference wins	PW	Postseason wins
DC	Division championships	OW	Overall wins	CL	Conference losses	PL	Postseason losses
CC	Conference championships	OL	Overall losses	CT	Conference ties	PT	Postseason ties
NC	National championships	OT	Overall ties (Note: Overtime rules in college football were introduced in 1996, making ties impossible in the period since.)	C%	Conference winning percentage		
†	Elected to the College Football Hall of Fame	O%	Overall winning percentage (Note: When computing the win–loss percentage, a tie counts as half a win and half a loss.)				

== Coaches ==
List of head football coaches showing season(s) coached, overall records, conference records, postseason records, championships and selected awards (Note: Statistics correct as of the end of the 2025 NCAA Division I FBS football season.)
No.	Name (Note: Syracuse did not have a head coach for the 1889 and 1893 seasons.)	Season(s) (Note: Syracuse did not field a team for the 1943 season.)	GC	OW	OL	OT	O%	CW	CL	CT	C%	PW	PL	PT	CC	NC	Awards
1	Robert Winston	1890	11	7	4	0	0.636	—	—	—	—	—	—	—	—	—	—
2	William Galbraith	1891	10	4	6	0	0.400	—	—	—	—	—	—	—	—	—	—
3	Jordan C. Wells	1892	9	0	8	1	0.056	—	—	—	—	—	—	—	—	—	—
4	George H. Bond	1894	11	6	5	0	0.545	—	—	—	—	—	—	—	—	—	—
5	George O. Redington	1895–1896	20	11	5	4	0.650	—	—	—	—	—	—	—	—	—	—
6	Frank E. Wade	1897–1899	28	17	9	2	0.643	—	—	—	—	—	—	—	—	—	—
7	Edwin Sweetland	1900–1902	27	20	5	2	0.778	—	—	—	—	—	—	—	—	—	—
8	Jason B. Parrish	1903	9	5	4	0	0.556	—	—	—	—	—	—	—	—	—	—
9	Ancil D. Brown	1903	9	5	4	0	0.556	—	—	—	—	—	—	—	—	—	—
10	Charles P. Hutchins	1904–1905	10	14	6	0	0.700	—	—	—	—	—	—	—	—	—	—
11; 15; 17	Frank "Buck" O'Neill^{†}	1906–1907; 1913–1915; 1917–1919	77	52	19	6	0.714	—	—	—	—	—	—	—	—	—	—
12	Howard Jones^{†}	1908	10	6	3	1	0.650	—	—	—	—	—	—	—	—	—	—
13	Tad Jones^{†}	1909–1910	20	9	9	2	0.500	—	—	—	—	—	—	—	—	—	—
14	C. DeForest Cummings	1911–1912	19	9	8	2	0.526	—	—	—	—	—	—	—	—	—	—
16	Bill Hollenback^{†}	1916	9	5	4	0	0.556	—	—	—	—	—	—	—	—	—	—
18	Chick Meehan	1920–1924	47	35	8	4	0.787	—	—	—	—	—	—	—	—	—	—
19	Pete Reynolds	1925–1926	20	15	3	2	0.800	—	—	—	—	—	—	—	—	—	—
20	Lew Andreas	1927–1929	28	15	10	3	0.589	—	—	—	—	—	—	—	—	—	—
21	Vic Hanson^{†}	1930–1936	59	33	21	5	0.602	—	—	—	—	—	—	—	—	—	—
22	Ossie Solem	1937–1942; 1944–1945	63	30	27	6	0.524	—	—	—	—	—	—	—	—	—	—
23	Biggie Munn^{†}	1946	9	4	5	0	0.444	—	—	—	—	—	—	—	—	—	—
24	Reaves Baysinger	1947–1948	18	4	14	0	0.222	—	—	—	—	—	—	—	—	—	—
25	Ben Schwartzwalder^{†}	1949–1973	247	153	91	3	0.626	—	—	—	—	2	5	0	—	1	AFCA COY (1959); FWAA COY (1959)
26	Frank Maloney	1974–1980	78	32	46	0	0.410	—	—	—	—	1	0	0	—	0	—
27	Dick MacPherson^{†}	1981–1990	116	66	46	4	0.586	—	—	—	—	3	1	1	—	0	AFCA COY (1987); Paul "Bear" Bryant Award (1987); Bobby Dodd COY (1987); FWAA COY (1987); Sporting News COY (1987); Walter Camp COY (1987)
28	Paul Pasqualoni	1991–2004	167	107	59	1	0.644	73	34	0	0.682	6	3	0	4	0	—
29	Greg Robinson (Note: Due to NCAA sanctions, Syracuse had all wins from the 2005 and 2006 seasons vacated, one from 2005 and four from 2006. Originally, Syracuse was 1–10 (0–8 Big East) in 2005 and 4–8 (1–7 Big East) in 2006.)	2005–2008	42	5	37	—	0.119	2	25	—	0.074	0	0	—	0	0	—
30	Doug Marrone	2009–2012	50	25	25	—	0.500	11	17	—	0.393	2	0	—	1	0	—
31	Scott Shafer	2013–2015	37	14	23	—	0.378	7	17	—	0.292	1	0	—	0	0	—
32	Dino Babers	2016–2023	96	41	55	—	0.427	20	45	—	0.308	1	1	—	0	0	—
33	Fran Brown	2024–present	25	13	12	—	0.520	6	10	—	0.375	1	0	—	0	0	—
