= List of Miami Hurricanes head football coaches =

List of head football coaches for the Miami Hurricanes

The Miami Hurricanes college football team represents University of Miami in the Atlantic Coast Conference (ACC), as part of the NCAA Division I Football Bowl Subdivision. The program has had 23 head coaches, and 3 interim head coaches, since it began play during the 1927 season. Since December 2021, Mario Cristobal has served as Miami's head coach.

Sixteen coaches have led Miami in postseason bowl games: Tom McCann, Jack Harding, Andy Gustafson, Charlie Tate, Howard Schnellenberger, Jimmy Johnson, Dennis Erickson, Butch Davis, Larry Coker, Randy Shannon, Jeff Stoutland, Al Golden, Larry Scott, Mark Richt, Manny Diaz, and Cristobal. Three of those coaches also won conference championships: Erickson, Davis, and Coker each captured three as a member of the Big East Conference. Four have also captured national championships as head coach at Miami: Schnellenberger (1983), Johnson (1987), Erickson (1989 and 1991), and Coker (2001).

Gustafson is the leader in seasons coached, with 16 years as head coach and games coached (161) and won (93). Erickson has the highest winning percentage at 0.875. Walt Kichefski has the lowest winning percentage of those who have coached more than one game, with 0.222. Of the 23 different head coaches who have led the Hurricanes, Harding, Gustafson, Pete Elliott, Johnson, Erickson, and Richt have been inducted into the College Football Hall of Fame.

== Key ==
Key to symbols in coaches list
General		Overall		Conference		Postseason (Note: Although the first Rose Bowl Game was played in 1902, it has been continuously played since the 1916 game, and is recognized as the oldest bowl game by the NCAA. "—" indicates any season prior to 1916 when postseason games were not played.)	
No.	Order of coaches (Note: A running total of the number of head coaches, with coaches who served separate tenures being counted only once. Interim head coaches are represented with "Int" and are not counted in the running total. "—" indicates the team played but either without a coach or no coach is on record. "X" indicates an interim year without play.)	GC	Games coached	CW	Conference wins	PW	Postseason wins
DC	Division championships	OW	Overall wins	CL	Conference losses	PL	Postseason losses
CC	Conference championships	OL	Overall losses	CT	Conference ties	PT	Postseason ties
NC	National championships	OT	Overall ties (Note: Overtime rules in college football were introduced in 1996, making ties impossible in the period since.)	C%	Conference winning percentage		
†	Elected to the College Football Hall of Fame	O%	Overall winning percentage (Note: When computing the win–loss percentage, a tie counts as half a win and half a loss.)				

== Coaches ==
List of head football coaches showing season(s) coached, overall records, conference records (Note: Miami has been a member of Atlantic Coast Conference since the 2004 season.), postseason records, championships and selected awards (Note: Statistics correct as of the end of the 2025 NCAA Division I FBS football season.)
No.	Name	Season(s)	GC	OW	OL	OT	O%	CW	CL	CT	C%	PW	PL	PT	DCs	CCs	NCs	Awards
1	Cub Buck	1927–1928	19	7	10	2	0.421	—	—	—	—	—	—	—	—	—	0	—
2	J. Burton Rix	1929	5	3	2	0	0.600	—	—	—	—	—	—	—	—	—	0	—
3	Ernest E. Brett	1930	8	3	4	1	0.438	2	3	1	0.417	—	—	—	—	0	0	—
4	Tom McCann	1931–1934	37	18	15	4	0.541	6	6	3	0.500	0	1	0	—	0	0	—
5	Irl Tubbs	1935–1936	18	11	5	2	0.667	4	1	0	0.800	0	0	0	—	0	0	—
6	Jack Harding^{†}	1937–1942; 1945–1947	89	54	32	3	0.624	10	1	0	0.909	1	0	0	—	0	0	—
7	Eddie Dunn	1943–1944	15	6	8	1	0.433	—	—	—	—	0	0	0	—	—	0	—
8	Andy Gustafson^{†}	1948–1963	161	93	65	3	0.587	—	—	—	—	1	3	0	—	—	0	—
9	Charlie Tate	1964–1970	64	34	27	3	0.555	—	—	—	—	1	1	0	—	—	0	—
Int.	Walt Kichefski (Note: Kichefski served as interim head coach for the final nine games in 1970 after the resignation of Charlie Tate.)	1970	9	2	7	0	0.222	—	—	—	—	0	0	0	—	—	0	—
10	Fran Curci	1971–1972	22	9	13	0	0.409	—	—	—	—	0	0	0	—	—	0	—
11	Pete Elliott^{†}	1973–1974	22	11	11	0	0.500	—	—	—	—	0	0	0	—	—	0	—
12	Carl Selmer	1975–1976	21	5	16	0	0.238	—	—	—	—	0	0	0	—	—	0	—
13	Lou Saban	1977–1978	22	9	13	0	0.409	—	—	—	—	0	0	0	—	—	0	—
14	Howard Schnellenberger	1979–1983	57	41	16	0	0.719	—	—	—	—	2	0	0	—	—	1 – 1983	Eddie Robinson Coach of the Year Award (1983)
15	Jimmy Johnson^{†}	1984–1988	61	52	9	0	0.852	—	—	—	—	2	3	0	—	—	1 – 1987	Walter Camp Coach of the Year (1986)
16	Dennis Erickson^{†}	1989–1994	72	63	9	0	0.875	19	1	0	0.950	3	3	0	—	3	2 – 1989; 1991	Woody Hayes Award (1992); Sporting News College Football Coach of the Year (1992)
17	Butch Davis	1995–2000	71	51	20	0	0.718	33	9	0	0.786	4	0	0	—	3	0	—
18	Larry Coker	2001–2006	75	60	15	—	0.800	34	11	—	0.756	4	2	—	0	3	1 – 2001	AFCA Coach of the Year (2001); Paul "Bear" Bryant Award (2001)
19	Randy Shannon	2007–2010	50	28	22	—	0.560	16	16	—	0.500	1	1	—	0	0	0	—
Int.	Jeff Stoutland (Note: Stoutland served as interim head coach for the 2010 Sun Bowl after Randy Shannon was fired.)	2010	1	0	1	—	.000	0	0	—	–	0	1	—	0	0	0	—
20	Al Golden	2011–2015	57	32	25	—	0.561	17	18	—	0.486	0	2	—	1	0	0	—
Int.	Larry Scott (Note: Scott served as interim head coach for the final six games of the 2015 season after Al Golden was fired.)	2015	6	4	2	—	0.667	4	1	—	0.800	0	1	—	0	0	0	—
21	Mark Richt^{†}	2016–2018	39	26	13	—	0.667	16	8	—	0.667	1	2	—	1	0	0	Walter Camp Coach of the Year Award (2017)
22	Manny Diaz	2019–2021	36	21	15	—	0.583	16	9	—	0.640	0	2	—	0	0	0	—
23	Mario Cristobal	2022–present	54	35	19	—	0.648	18	14	—	0.563	3	3	—	0	0	0	—
