= List of Tulane Green Wave head football coaches =

The Tulane Green Wave college football team represents Tulane University in the American Athletic Conference (AAC). The Green Wave compete as part of the NCAA Division I Football Bowl Subdivision. The program has had 43 head coaches since it began play during the 1893 season. Since 2026, Will Hall has served as head coach at Tulane.

Thirteen coaches have led Tulane in postseason bowl games: R. R. Brown, Bernie Bierman, Ted Cox, Red Dawson, Jim Pittman, Bennie Ellender, Larry Smith, Vince Gibson, Mack Brown, Chris Scelfo, Curtis Johnson, Willie Fritz, and Jon Sumrall. Six of those coaches also won conference championships: Cox, Dawson, and Henry Frnka each captured one as a member of the Southeastern Conference; Tommy Bowden captured one as a member of Conference USA; and Fritz and Sumrall each captured one as a member of the AAC. In 2025, Sumrall led Tulane to the program’s first-ever College Football Playoff berth.

Clark Shaughnessy is the leader in seasons coached, with 11 years as head coach and games won with 59. Willie Fritz is the leader in games coached, at 101 games overall. H. T. Summersgill has the highest winning percentage at 0.909. Fred Sweet and Mark Hutson have the lowest winning percentage of those who have coached more than one game, with 0.000. Of the 42 different head coaches who have led the Green Wave, Shaughnessy, Bierman, Claude Simons Jr., and Brown have been inducted into the College Football Hall of Fame.

== Key ==
Key to symbols in coaches list
General		Overall		Conference		Postseason (Note: Although the first Rose Bowl Game was played in 1902, it has been continuously played since the 1916 game, and is recognized as the oldest bowl game by the NCAA. "—" indicates any season prior to 1916 when postseason games were not played.)	
No.	Order of coaches (Note: A running total of the number of head coaches, with coaches who served separate tenures being counted only once. Interim head coaches are represented with "Int" and are not counted in the running total. "—" indicates the team played but either without a coach or no coach is on record. "X" indicates an interim year without play.)	GC	Games coached	CW	Conference wins	PW	Postseason wins
DC	Division championships	OW	Overall wins	CL	Conference losses	PL	Postseason losses
CC	Conference championships	OL	Overall losses	CT	Conference ties	PT	Postseason ties
NC	National championships	OT	Overall ties (Note: Overtime rules in college football were introduced in 1996, making ties impossible in the period since.)	C%	Conference winning percentage		
†	Elected to the College Football Hall of Fame	O%	Overall winning percentage (Note: When computing the win–loss percentage, a tie counts as half a win and half a loss.)				

== Coaches ==
List of head football coaches showing season(s) coached, overall records, conference records, postseason records, championships and selected awards (Note: Statistics correct as of the end of the 2024 NCAA Division I FBS football season.)
No.	Name	Term	GC	OW	OL	OT	O%	CW	CL	CT	C%	PW	PL	CCs	NCs
1	T. L. Bayne	1893; 1895	8	4	4	0	0.500	1	2	0	0.333	—	—	0	0
2	Fred Sweet	1894	4	0	4	0	.000	—	—	—	—	—	—	—	0
3	Harry Baum	1896	5	3	2	0	0.600	1	2	0	0.333	—	—	0	0
4	John Lombard	1898	2	1	1	0	0.500	1	1	0	0.500	—	—	0	0
5	Harris T. Collier	1899	7	0	6	1	0.071	0	5	0	.000	—	—	0	0
6	H. T. Summersgill	1900–1901	11	10	1	0	0.909	6	0	0	1.000	—	—	0	0
7	Virginius Dabney	1902	7	1	4	2	0.286	0	4	2	0.167	—	—	0	0
8	Charles Eshleman	1903	5	2	2	1	0.500	0	1	1	0.250	—	—	0	0
9	Thomas A. Barry	1904	7	5	2	0	0.714	3	2	0	0.600	—	—	0	0
10	John F. Tobin	1905	1	0	1	0	.000	0	1	0	.000	—	—	0	0
11	John Russ	1906	5	0	4	1	0.100	0	3	0	.000	—	—	0	0
12	Joe Curtis	1907–1908	13	10	3	0	0.769	3	1	0	0.750	—	—	0	0
13	R. R. Brown	1909	9	4	3	2	0.556	2	0	2	0.750	0	1	0	0
14	Appleton A. Mason	1910–1912	24	10	13	1	0.438	4	10	0	0.286	0	0	0	0
15	A. C. Hoffman	1913	8	3	5	0	0.375	0	4	0	.000	0	0	0	0
16	Edwin Sweetland	1914	7	3	3	1	0.500	0	3	1	0.125	0	0	0	0
17	Clark Shaughnessy^{†}	1915–1920; 1922–1926	94	59	28	7	0.665	26	19	3	0.573	0	0	0	0
18	Myron Fuller	1921	10	4	6	0	0.400	2	2	0	0.500	0	0	0	0
19	Bernie Bierman^{†}	1927–1931	49	36	10	3	0.765	24	8	2	0.735	0	1	0	0
20	Ted Cox	1932–1935	40	28	10	2	0.725	20	7	2	0.724	1	0	1	0
21	Red Dawson	1936–1941	59	36	19	4	0.644	16	13	3	0.547	0	1	1	0
22	Claude Simons Jr.^{†}	1942–1945	31	13	17	1	0.435	4	10	1	0.300	0	0	0	0
23	Henry Frnka	1946–1951	58	31	23	4	0.569	18	15	3	0.542	0	0	1	0
24	Raymond Wolf	1952–1953	20	6	13	1	0.325	3	11	0	0.214	0	0	0	0
25	Andy Pilney	1954–1961	80	25	49	6	0.350	11	36	4	0.255	0	0	0	0
26	Tommy O'Boyle	1962–1965	40	6	33	1	0.163	2	23	1	0.096	0	0	0	0
27	Jim Pittman	1966–1970	52	21	30	1	0.413	—	—	—	—	1	0	—	0
28	Bennie Ellender	1971–1975	56	27	29	0	0.482	—	—	—	—	0	1	—	0
29	Larry Smith	1976–1979	45	18	27	0	0.400	—	—	—	—	0	1	—	0
30	Vince Gibson	1980–1982	34	17	17	0	0.500	—	—	—	—	0	1	—	0
31	Wally English	1983–1984	22	5	17	0	0.227	—	—	—	—	0	0	—	0
32	Mack Brown^{†}	1985–1987	34	11	23	0	0.324	—	—	—	—	0	1	—	0
33	Greg Davis	1988–1991	45	14	31	0	0.311	—	—	—	—	0	0	—	0
34	Buddy Teevens	1992–1996	56	11	45	0	0.196	1	4	—	0.200	0	0	0	0
35	Tommy Bowden	1997–1998	22	18	4	—	0.818	11	1	—	0.917	0	0	1	0
36	Chris Scelfo	1998–2006	94	37	57	—	0.394	18	42	—	0.300	2	0	0	0
37	Bob Toledo	2007–2011	61	15	46	—	0.246	8	32	—	0.200	0	0	0	0
38	Mark Hutson	2011	6	0	6	—	.000	0	5	—	.000	0	0	0	0
39	Curtis Johnson	2012–2015	49	15	34	—	0.306	10	22	—	0.313	0	1	0	0
40	Willie Fritz	2016–2023	101	54	47	—	0.535	31	33	—	0.484	3	1	1	0
41	Slade Nagle	2023	1	0	1	—	.000	—	—	—	—	0	1	0	0
42	Jon Sumrall	2024–2025	28	20	8	—	0.714	14	2	—	0.875	0	2	1	0
43	Will Hall	2026–present	0	0	0	—	–	0	0	—	–	0	0	0	0
