= Joe Reilly (American football) =

American football player, coach, and administrator (1880–1951)

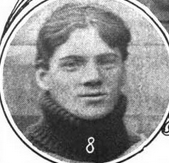
- Reilly in 1903

Biographical details
- Born: October 8, 1880; Boston, Massachusetts, U.S.
- Died: November 10, 1951 (aged 70); Alameda, California, U.S.

Playing career
- 1899: Boston College
- 1900–1903: Georgetown
- Position: Halfback

Coaching career (HC unless noted)
- 1904–1907: Georgetown
- 1908: Boston College

Head coaching record
- Overall: 19–17–3

Accomplishments and honors

Awards
- All-Southern (1903)

Joseph Augustus Reilly (October 8, 1880 – November 10, 1951) was an American college football player, coach, and athletic director. He served as the head football coach of Georgetown University from 1904 to 1907, and the co-head football coach (with Joe Kenney) at Boston College in 1908. From 1909 to 1937 he was the director of the Kansas City Athletic Club. Later in life he also served as a "midwestern sports official, and wrestling judge at several Olympic Games".

== Early years ==
Joe Reilly was born on October 8, 1880, in the Charlestown neighborhood of Boston, Massachusetts. His father Timothy Reilly was born in Ireland. His mother's maiden name was O'Brien.

== Football playing career ==
=== Boston College ===
Reilly attended Boston College, graduating in 1899. He was a member of the 1899 football team, "Boston College's first great team".

=== Georgetown University ===
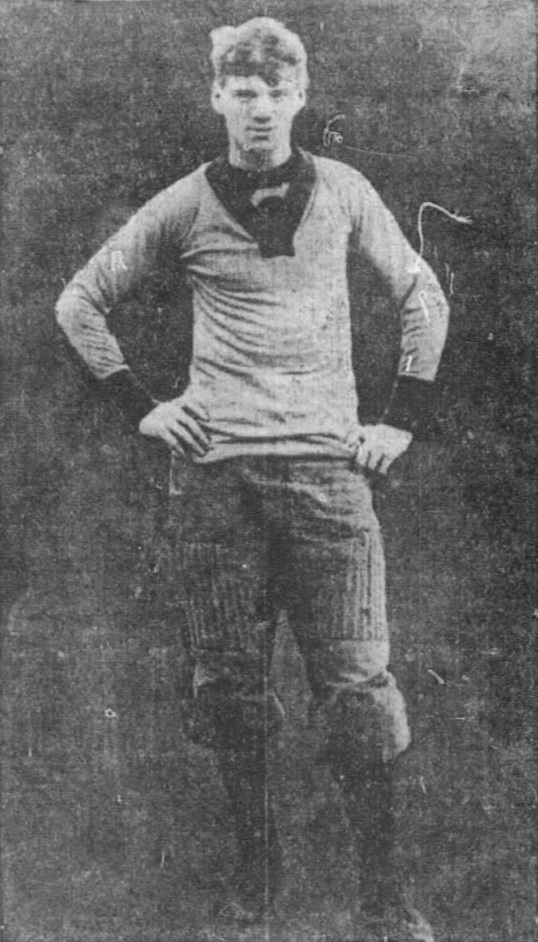
Dr. Reilly

Reilly played for the Georgetown Blue and Gray at Georgetown University. As a player, he was an All-Southern halfback and captain of the 1902 team. An account of a 12–5 victory over Navy reads "No occupants of the half back positions who have been seen here this season have approached the showing made by Joe Reilly to-day." Hub Hart, who had also attended Boston College, was in the same backfield. Reilly also lettered in other sports, including baseball and rowing. He ran track as well, captaining the squad and called its fastest man. He once held the record for the 220 yards.

== Coaching career ==
From 1904 to 1907, Reilly served as the head football coach of Georgetown University. He was the first former Georgetown player to become the school's head coach. Reilly also coached track.

In 1908 he served as co-head football coach, with Joe Kenney, at his alma mater, Boston College. 1908 was the first season that Boston College returned to varsity status after the program was dropped in 1902. His record for the year was 2–4–2.

== Kansas City Athletic Club ==
Reilly was director of the Kansas City Athletic Club from 1909 until 1937.

== Head coaching record ==
Year	Team	Overall	Conference	Standing	Bowl/playoffs
Georgetown Blue and Gray (Independent) (1904–1907)
1904	Georgetown	7–1			
1905	Georgetown	2–7			
1906	Georgetown	6–1			
1907	Georgetown	2–4–1			
Georgetown:		17–13–1			
Boston College (Independent) (1908)
1908	Boston College	2–4–2			
Boston College:		2–4–2			
Total:		19–17–3			
