= Joe Kenney =

American football player and coach

Playing career
- 1898–1899: Boston College
- 1901–1902: Boston College

Coaching career (HC unless noted)
- 1908: Boston College

Head coaching record
- Overall: 2–4–2

Joseph Kenney was an American college football player and coach. He served as the co-head football coach with Joe Reilly at Boston College in 1908, compiling a record of 2–4–2. 1908 was the first season that Boston College returned to varsity status after the program was dropped in 1902.

== Early life and education ==
Kenney was the captain of the 1899 Boston College football team, which lost only one game to Brown University. He was a 1901 graduate of Boston College.

== Personal life ==
Kenney later went into the insurance business.

== Head coaching record ==
Year	Team	Overall	Conference	Standing	Bowl/playoffs
Boston College (Independent) (1908)
1908	Boston College	2–4–2			
Boston College:		2–4–2			
Total:		2–4–2			
