= Joseph Courtney (American football) =

American football player, coach, and official (1884–1922)

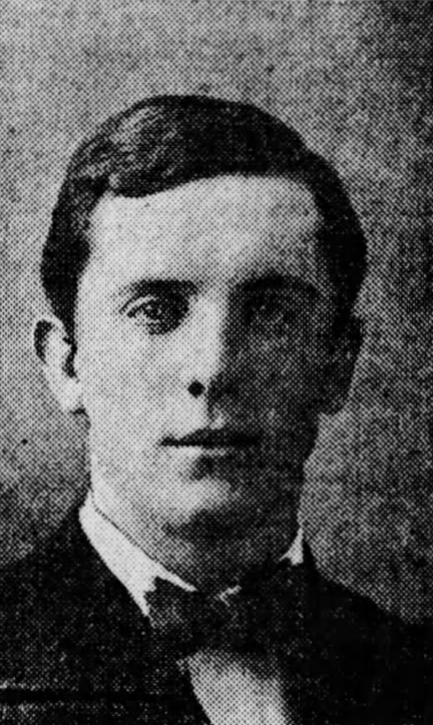
- Courtney pictured in The Brooklyn Daily Eagle, 1909

Biographical details
- Born: November 23, 1884; Worcester, Massachusetts, U.S.
- Died: June 2, 1922 (aged 37); Westport, Connecticut, U.S.

Playing career

Football
- 1906: Holy Cross
- 1907: Villanova
- 1908: Lafayette
- Positions: Halfback, end

Coaching career (HC unless noted)

Football
- 1909: Boys HS (NY)
- 1911: Boston College
- 1912–1914: Dartmouth (assistant)
- 1915: Norwich
- 1919: Montclair HS (NJ)
- 1921: Orange A. A.

Baseball
- 1911: Stone School

Head coaching record
- Overall: 0–15 (college football)

Joseph Patrick Courtney (November 23, 1884 – June 2, 1922) was an American football player, coach, and official. He served as the head football coach at Boston College in 1911 and Norwich University in 1915, compiling a career college football coaching record of 0–15.

== Biography ==
A native of Worcester, Massachusetts, Courtney played football for the College of the Holy Cross, Villanova University, and Lafayette College. A cousin, Joseph A. Courtney, was also a noted athlete during the same era and was the captain of the Georgetown baseball team at the time of his death from pneumonia in March 1909.

Courtney began his coaching career in 1909 at the Boys High School in Brooklyn. He later coached at Boston College, Stone School, Dartmouth College (assistant), Norwich University, Montclair High School, and the Orange Athletic Association (Orange A. A). He may have coached briefly at New Hampshire. (Note: Newspaper reports during the 1911 season stated that Courtney briefly coached the 1911 New Hampshire football team in mid-October, although this is in conflict with him being coach of the 1911 Boston College football team for their entire season.)

Courtney was also a football official and basketball official for high school and college football games. Courtney was assaulted during a Thanksgiving Day game in November 1915 by a high school player, reportedly "knocking out a tooth and breaking another". The player was arrested; in court the next day, Courtney declined to press charges.

During World War I, Courtney served with the 4th United States Aero Squadron in France and single-handedly took down two enemy aircraft. He was wounded in action. After the war, Courtney was an Internal Revenue Service agent attached to the real estate tax division in New Haven, Connecticut. In 1919, he moved to Bloomfield, New Jersey, where his mother and sister lived.

On June 2, 1922, a train engineer reported that he believed he had passed over a body on the tracks near the Westport Station in Westport, Connecticut. A railroad police officer was dispatched to Westport, where he discovered Courtney's badly mutilated body. The night prior, Coutrney had been seen arguing with a group of foreigners. The undertaker found two small puncture marks behind Courtney's left ear, however the death was ruled an accident. Courtney was buried at St. John's Cemetery in Worcester.

== Head coaching record ==
=== College football ===
Year	Team	Overall	Conference	Standing	Bowl/playoffs
Boston College (Independent) (1911)
1911	Boston College	0–7			
Boston College:		0–7			
Norwich Cadets (Independent) (1915)
1915	Norwich	0–8			
Norwich:		0–8			
Total:		0–15			
