= Dick Voris =

American football player and coach (1922–2008)

Biographical details
- Born: January 25, 1922; Los Angeles, California, U.S.
- Died: December 26, 2008 (aged 86)

Playing career
- 1947–1948: San Jose State
- Position: Center

Coaching career (HC unless noted)
- 1952–1953: Hartnell
- 1954: Los Angeles Rams (assistant)
- 1955–1957: Army (DL)
- 1958–1960: Virginia
- 1961–1962: Green Bay Packers (WR/TE)
- 1963–1967: San Francisco 49ers (DL)
- 1968–1970: St. Louis Cardinals (DL)
- 1971: St. Louis Cardinals (DC/LB)
- 1972: Detroit Lions (LB)
- 1973: Baltimore Colts (DC/LB)
- 1974–1975: New York Jets (DC/LB)
- 1976: Tampa Bay Buccaneers (LB)

Head coaching record
- Overall: 1–29 (college); 20–0–1 (junior college)
- Bowls: 0–0–1 (junior college)

Accomplishments and honors

Championships
- 2 Coast Conference (1952–1953)

Richard J. Voris (January 25, 1922 – December 26, 2008) was an American football player and coach. He served as head football coach at the University of Virginia from 1958 to 1960, compiling a record of 1–29.

== Early life ==
Voris graduated from Santa Cruz High School in 1940, where he was on the varsity football team as well as a member of the golf team and track and field. He graduated from Salinas Junior College—now known as Hartnell College—in 1942.

== Coaching career ==
Voris was named head coach of the Virginia Cavaliers football program on February 11, 1958. In his three seasons at the helm, the Cavaliers went 1–29. That mark included a 28-game losing streak, then an NCAA major-college record. His only win came against Duke with a score of 15–12. He resigned shortly after the conclusion of the 1960 season, on December 9.

Following his stint at Virginia, Voris was hired by the Green Bay Packers of the NFL. From 1961 to 1962, he served as the teams director of player personnel and also as an assistant on Vince Lombardi's staff, coaching the ends. During that period the Packers won two league championships.

He was also an assistant coach with the San Francisco 49ers and at San Jose State.

After coaching James Lick High School to a championship, he brought nine players from the San Jose area and two from his previous coaching job in Hanford to join Salinas Valley area players.

In his two seasons at Hartnell, his teams compiled a 20–0–1 record.

== Head coaching record ==
=== College ===
Year	Team	Overall	Conference	Standing	Bowl/playoffs
Virginia Cavaliers (Atlantic Coast Conference) (1958–1960)
1958	Virginia	1–9	1–5	8th	
1959	Virginia	0–10	0–5	8th	
1960	Virginia	0–10	0–6	8th	
Virginia:		1–29	1–16		
Total:		1–29			

=== Junior college ===
Year	Team	Overall	Conference	Standing	Bowl/playoffs
Hartnell Panthers (Coast Conference) (1952–1953)
1952	Hartnell	10–0–1	4–0	1st	T Junior Rose Bowl
1953	Hartnell	10–0	4–0	1st	
Hartnell:		20–0–1	8–0		
Total:		20–0–1			
National championship Conference title Conference division title or championship game berth
