= Hatch (surname) =

Hatch is an English surname taken by people living near an important gate or entrance of some kind, or people living in a locality with this or a similar name. The Old English for gate is hœcce.

Many notable people have this surname, among them being:

- Annia Hatch (born 1978), Cuban-American gymnast, who competed at the 2004 Olympics
- Ashley Hatch (born 1995), American soccer player
- A. Gould Hatch (1896–1970), New York politician
- Beatrice Hatch (1866–1947), muse of Lewis Carroll
- Carl Hatch (1889–1963), U.S. Senator from New Mexico
- Sir David Hatch (1939–2007), BBC Radio executive
- Edward Hatch (1832–1889), American general and Indian fighter
- Edwin Hatch (1835–1889), English theologian
- Eric S. Hatch (1901–1973), American novelist
- Ethel Hatch (1869–1975), daughter of Edwin Hatch
- Evelyn Hatch (1871–1951), daughter of Edwin Hatch
- Frederick Hatch (disambiguation)
- George Hatch, mayor of Cincinnati from 1861 to 1863
- George C. Hatch (1919–2009), American businessman and cable TV pioneer
- Harry C. Hatch (1884–1946), Canadian industrialist
- Hector Hatch (1936–2016), Fijian sportsman, politician and civil servant
- Henry John Hatch (1818–1895), English clergyman sent to Newgate for indecent assault but subsequently pardoned
- Herschel H. Hatch (1837–1920), U.S. Representative
- Ike Hatch (1892–1961), American musician and club owner in Britain
- Israel T. Hatch (1808–1875), U.S. Representative from New York
- Jack Hatch (born 1950), Iowa state senator
- Jethro A. Hatch (1832–1912), U.S. Representative from Indiana
- Joe Hatch (born 2006), Welsh footballer
- John Porter Hatch, (1822–1901), American soldier
- Mary R. P. Hatch (1848-1935), American writer
- Marshall Hatch (born 1932), Australian biochemist and plant physiologist
- Melville Hatch (1898–1988), American entomologist who specialized in the study of beetles
- Mike Hatch (born 1948), attorney general of Minnesota
- Orrin Hatch (1934–2022), U.S. Senator from Utah
- Ozias M. Hatch (1814–1893), Illinois Secretary of State
- Richard Hatch (disambiguation)
- Robert Hatch (disambiguation)
- Sidney Hatch (1883–1966), American long-distance runner who competed in the 1904 Summer Olympics
- Stephani Hatch, American sociologist and psychiatric epidemiologist
- Thom Hatch, American author
- Thomas Hatch (born 1994), American baseball player
- Thomas V. Hatch (born 1950), Utah politician
- Tony Hatch (born 1939), English composer, songwriter, pianist, music arranger and producer
- Wilbur Hatch (1902–1969), American music composer
- William Hatch (disambiguation)

== See also ==
- General Hatch (disambiguation)
- Senator Hatch (disambiguation)
