= Hatch =

Hatch or The Hatch may refer to:

== Common meanings ==
=== Biology ===
- Hatch, to emerge from an egg
- Hatch(ing), the process of egg incubation

=== Portals ===
- Cargo hatch of a ship
- Hatch, a sealed or secure door of a spacecraft
- Hatch, the bottom half of a Dutch door
- Hatch, the rear door of a hatchback car
- Hatch, a sealed or secure horizontal door in the bottom of a deck of a ship, submarine or aircraft, see ship door
- Hatch, a sluice gate
- Hatch, a trapdoor, a door on a floor or ceiling

== Places ==
=== Antarctica ===
- Hatch Islands, Wilkes Land, Antarctica
- Hatch Plain, Coats Land, Antarctica

=== Australia ===
- The Hatch, New South Wales, a suburb within Port Macquarie-Hastings Council

=== England ===
- Hatch, Bedfordshire, a hamlet
- Hatch Beauchamp, Somerset
- Hatch Park, a Site of Special Scientific Interest in Kent
- East Hatch and West Hatch, Wiltshire, hamlets within the parish of West Tisbury, Wiltshire
- West Hatch, hamlet and civil parish in Somerset

=== United States ===
- Hatch, Idaho, an unincorporated community
- Hatch, Missouri, an unincorporated community
- Hatch, New Mexico, a village
- Hatch, Utah, a town
- Hatch Lake, Minnesota

== People with the name ==
- Hatch (surname)
- Harrison Hatch Rosdahl (1941–2004), American football player

== Arts, entertainment, and media ==
- Hatch (film), a 2024 Canadian short drama film
- Hatch, a magazine website published by Australian college Macleay College
- Hatch, a bug-like villain from the TV show Hot Wheels Battle Force 5
- The Hatch, the third DHARMA Initiative station in the television show Lost

== Business ==
- Hatch (e-commerce company), an ecommerce platform based in Amsterdam
- Hatch Ltd, an engineering and development consulting company based in Canada
- Hatch (Sri Lanka), a co-working space and startup incubator

== Transportation ==
- Mini Hatch, a supermini car
- Suzuki Hatch, two different cars built by Suzuki
- Hatch-class lifeboat, formerly operated by the Royal National Lifeboat Institution of the United Kingdom and Ireland
- Hatch Municipal Airport, near Hatch, New Mexico
- Hatch Airport, Stayton, Oregon

== Other uses ==
- Hatch Auditorium, a facility of the North Carolina Baptist Assembly at Fort Caswell, North Carolina
- University Hall (Dublin), also known as Hatch Hall, a building
- Hatch chile, sub-cultivars of the New Mexico chile pepper cultivar group

== See also ==
- Hatch Act of 1887, United States legislation
- Hatch Act of 1939, United States legislation
- Hatch House (disambiguation)
- Hatch's Minnesota Cavalry Battalion, an American Civil War and Indian Wars unit
- Hatchback, an automobile design
- Serving hatch, an opening in the kitchen wall for passing food
- Hatching (disambiguation)
