= Ethel Hatch =

British artist

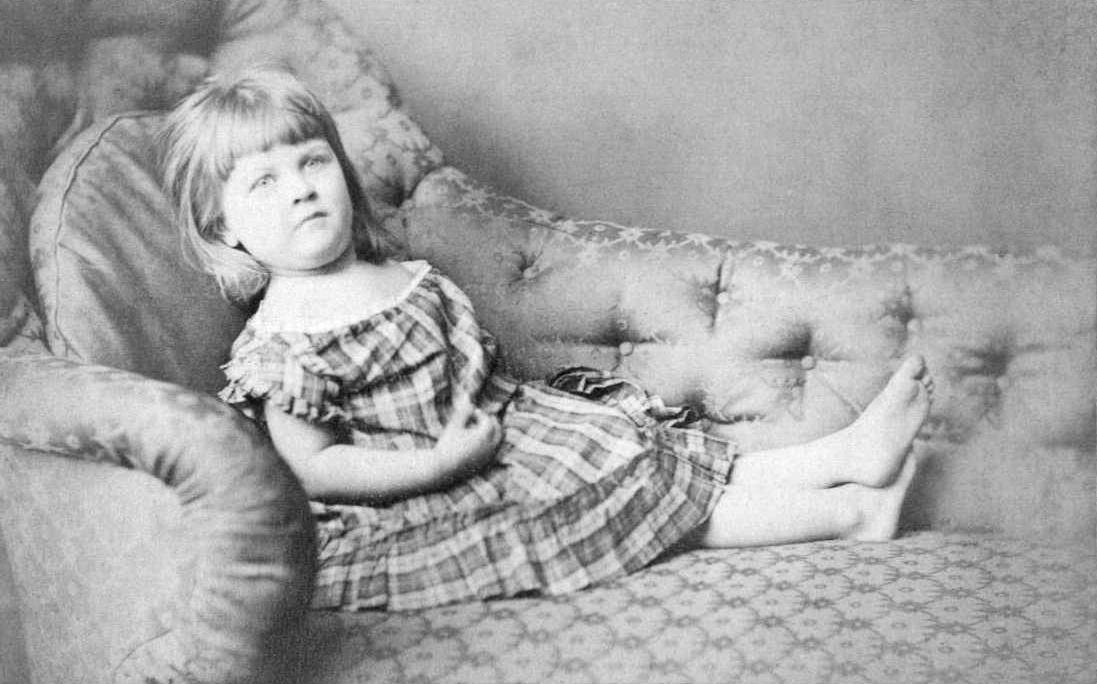
- Portrait of a three-year-old Ethel by Charles Lutwidge Dodgson in 1872.
- Born: Ethel Charlotte Chase Hatch; 17 May 1869; Oxford, England
- Died: 3 April 1975 (aged 105); London, England
- Education: Oxford High School, Oxford; Slade School of Art
- Occupations: Artist, painter
- Known for: Paintings; Association with Lewis Carroll
- Parent(s): Edwin Hatch and Evelyn Hatch
- Relatives: Beatrice Hatch (sister); Evelyn Maud Hatch (sister)

Ethel Charlotte Chase Hatch (17 May 1869 – 3 April 1975) was a British artist known for her floral scenes and for her association with Charles Lutwidge Dodgson, more commonly known as Lewis Carroll. She was a society figure, belonging to the British upper class; she was the daughter of Rev. Edwin Hatch, as well as the sister of Beatrice Sheward Hatch and Evelyn Maud Hatch.

== Early life ==
Ethel Charlotte Chase Hatch was born as the youngest daughter of Evelyn and Edwin Hatch. Ethel had two sisters, being Beatrice and Evelyn Maud, the latter presumably being named after her mother. She also had a brother named Arthur Herbert Hatch (b. 1864), who was House Prefect at his school, Malvern College. The family lived in a Gothic-style house built in 1867 on Banbury Road in Norham Gardens, North Oxford, England. The house was described as having "arched windows, a tower, and a turret complete with a statue niche towards the top." Neighborhood friends included Julia and Ethel Huxley, daughters of Thomas Henry Huxley and the aunts of Aldous Huxley. Other acquaintances in the neighbourhood who visited the Hatch family included Bonamy Price, Mark Pattison, and Benjamin Jowett.

Ethel's father Edwin was a theologian; author; a vice-principal of St. Mary Hall, Oxford; and later a university reader in Ecclesiastical history. The Hatch family moved in "stimulating circles", including friendships with Edward Burne-Jones, Algernon Charles Swinburne and William Morris.

Ethel attended Oxford High School, Oxford in Oxfordshire, a private girls school. She graduated at age 17 before going on holiday to St Leonards-on-Sea with her mother for three months. While on holiday, her mother continued to give her lessons to expand her education.

== Relationship with Dodgson ==
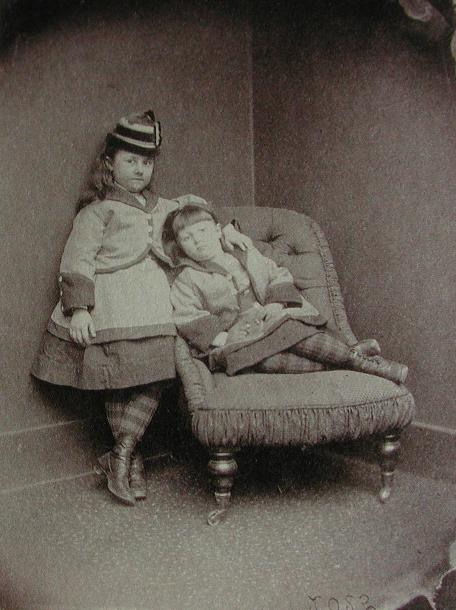
Beatrice and Ethel, taken by Dodgson in his Christ Church Studio on 24 March 1874

Ethel, along with her sisters, was introduced to Dodgson through mutual acquaintances. Dodgson cultivated "the friendship of many little girls", often photographing them. Dodgson's friendships with these children focused on upper-middle-class families, making sure "he did not seek very low-class children as friends." Ethel's family were of an upper middle class station and they subsequently became friends with Dodgson.

Ethel's mother gave permission to Dodgson to photograph her three girls and Dodgson was considered a family friend. Beatrice, rather than Ethel or Evelyn, was considered the "long term favorite of Dodgson." Dodgson's friendship with Ethel continued for a number of years, however.

Along with clothed photo shoots, Dodgson also photographed Ethel nude. She was considered one of Dodgson's muses. The photos that Dodgson took of nude prepubescent girls has been the cause of much discussion and speculation in contemporary times.

== Art ==
Dodgson tried to make arrangements for Ethel to study under Sir Hubert von Herkomer, a British painter of German descent. This arrangement did not come to fruition, however, and Ethel went to study at the Slade School of Art in London, England. While there, she focused on painting foreign scenes and flower arrangements. At Slade, Ethel studied under Henry Tonks, Philip Wilson Steer, and Frederick Brown. Ethel had Brown's figure painting class 1896–1897, where she earned an extra certificate for her work.

Ethel worked mostly with watercolors, and her paintings made the rounds at galleries for display. Christie's, the art business and a fine arts auction house, has auctioned off some of Ethel's work. One of those pieces was a signed watercolor called On the Sand, Midsummer. The 10 x 14¼ inch piece had a realised price of £352.

Works of Ethel's were presented at the New English Art Club, of which she was a member. Her technique won praise: "Amongst the oils, however, No. 51 At the Fair by Miss Ethel C. Hatch, though only a sketch, shows clever handling of the lights and of the varied colours. It suggests a crowd of children, but has to be observed from a considerable distance to be seen to advantage."

The Government Art Collection in Britain has a piece of Ethel's named A View of Lago di Orta in their collection. It was presented by the artist to the Collection in 1972 and was given GAC number 17065.

== Later life ==
On 10 November 1889, Ethel's father died. Ethel was 20 years old at the time. Ethel maintained a friendship with artist Joan Hassall, another artist, who had focused on wood engraving and book illustrating. For the 1959 release of The Yale Edition of the Swinburne Letters, 1854–1869, Volume 1; Volumes 1854–1869, Ethel donated letters to her father Edwin from Algernon Charles Swinburne. Four letters appear in the compilation, and Ethel copied all mention of Swinburne from her father's journals for the publication as well.

On 20 September 1920, at age 51, Ethel was among the chief mourners at the funeral of William Sanday, Dean Ireland's Professor of Exegesis of Holy Scripture at Oxford between 1883 and 1895. She was joined in formal mourning by her sister Evelyn, as well as Professor Cuthbert Turner. She died in Kensington in 1975, a month shy of her 106th birthday.
