= 1903 Colgate football team =

American college football season

1903 Colgate football
- Conference: Independent
- Record: 4–2–1
- Head coach: Bob Hatch (1st season)
- Captain: Carl H. Smith
- Home stadium: Whitnall Field

1903 Eastern college football independents records
	Conf.			Overall
Team	W	L	T	W		L		T
Princeton		–		11	–	0	–	0
Yale		–		11	–	1	–	0
Columbia		–		9	–	1	–	0
Dartmouth		–		9	–	1	–	0
Geneva		–		9	–	1	–	0
Holy Cross		–		8	–	2	–	0
Temple		–		4	–	1	–	0
Washington & Jefferson		–		8	–	2	–	0
Lehigh		–		9	–	2	–	1
Harvard		–		9	–	3	–	0
Penn		–		9	–	3	–	0
Army		–		6	–	2	–	1
Carlisle		–		6	–	2	–	1
Amherst		–		7	–	3	–	0
Lafayette		–		7	–	3	–	0
Cornell		–		6	–	3	–	1
Colgate		–		4	–	2	–	1
Penn State		–		5	–	3	–	0
Swarthmore		–		6	–	4	–	0
Dickinson		–		7	–	5	–	0
Brown		–		5	–	4	–	1
Syracuse		–		5	–	4	–	0
Fordham		–		1	–	1	–	0
Frankin & Marshall		–		5	–	5	–	1
Buffalo		–		4	–	4	–	0
Rutgers		–		4	–	4	–	1
Delaware		–		4	–	4	–	0
Villanova		–		2	–	2	–	0
Bucknell		–		4	–	5	–	0
Vermont		–		4	–	5	–	0
Tufts		–		5	–	8	–	0
Wesleyan		–		3	–	6	–	1
Springfield Training School		–		1	–	3	–	1
NYU		–		2	–	5	–	0
New Hampshire		–		2	–	6	–	1
Pittsburgh College		–		1	–	5	–	1
Western U. Penn.		–		1	–	8	–	1

The 1903 Colgate football team was an American football team that represented Colgate University as an independent during the 1903 college football season. In its first and only season under head coach Bob Hatch, the team compiled a 4–2–1 record. Carl Smith was the team captain. The team played its home games on Whitnall Field in Hamilton, New York.

== Schedule ==
Date	Opponent	Site	Result	Attendance	Source
September 26	at Army	The Plain; West Point, NY	T 0–0		
October 4	St. Lawrence	Whitnall Field; Hamilton, NY	W 40–0		
October 10	at Cornell	Percy Field; Ithaca, NY (rivalry)	L 0–12		
October 17	at Syracuse	Syracuse, NY	W 10–5	3,000	
October 31	Rochester	Whitnall Field; Hamilton, NY	W 23–5		
November 7	at Williams	Weston Field; Williamstown, MA	L 0–6		
November 14	Hamilton	Whitnall Field; Hamilton, NY	W 16–0		
