= Richard P. Giles =

American attorney and politician (1840–1896)

Richard Giles

Member-elect of the U.S. House of Representatives from Missouri's 1st district
- Died before taking office
- Preceded by: Charles Clark
- Succeeded by: James Lloyd

Personal details
- Born: Richard Porter Giles; June 20, 1840 Stephensburg, Kentucky, U.S.
- Died: November 17, 1896 (aged 56) Shelbina, Missouri, U.S.
- Party: Republican
- Education: St. Paul's College

Richard Porter Giles (June 20, 1840 – November 17, 1896) was an American attorney and Democratic politician from Missouri.

Giles was born in Stephensburg, Kentucky, on June 20, 1840, to Granville T. and Rosanna Giles. Giles was educated at St. Paul's College and went into the field of law through reading the law at a Palmyra, Missouri law firm. Giles was admitted to the bar in 1868, practicing in St. Joseph, Palmyra, and Shelbina, Missouri. He was elected Prosecuting Attorney of Shelby County, Missouri, in 1880 and elected four times.

Giles was elected to the United States House of Representatives from Missouri's First Congressional District on November 3, 1896. However, Giles died 14 days later on November 17, 1896, before his term of office began. James Tilghman Lloyd was elected in a special election to succeed Giles on June 1, 1897.

== See also ==
- List of United States representatives-elect who never took their seats

== Notes ==
U.S. House of Representatives
Preceded by Charles Clark	Member-elect of the U.S. House of Representatives from Missouri's 1st congressional district 1896	Succeeded by James Lloyd
