= Michael Noel =

American politician (born 1947)

Member of the Utah House of Representatives from the 73rd district
- In office January 1, 2003 – December 31, 2018
- Preceded by: Thomas V. Hatch
- Succeeded by: Phil Lyman

Personal details
- Born: October 17, 1947 (age 78) Ogden, Utah, U.S.
- Party: Republican
- Education: University of California, Berkeley; University of South Dakota
- Website: mikenoel.com

Michael "Mike" E. Noel (born October 17, 1947 in Ogden, Utah) is an American politician and a Republican member of the Utah House of Representatives who represented District 73 from January 1, 2003 - December 31, 2018.

== Early life and career ==
Noel earned his BA from UC Berkeley and his MS from the University of South Dakota. He began a PhD at Utah State University but did not complete it.

Noel worked for the United States Department of the Interior, Bureau of Land Management, as a Realty Specialist based in Kanab, Utah.

== Political career ==
- 2002 When District 73 Republican Representative Thomas V. Hatch ran for Utah State Senate and left the seat open, Noel ran in the June 25, 2002 Republican Primary, winning with 2,863 votes (52%) and was unopposed for the November 5, 2002 General election, winning with 8,587 votes.
- 2004 Noel was unopposed for the June 22, 2004 Republican Primary and won the November 2, 2004 General election with 10,218 votes (88.7%) against Green candidate Victoria Woodard.
- 2006 Noel was unopposed for the 2006 Republican Primary and won the November 7, 2006 General election against Constitution candidate Allison Howes.
- 2008 Noel was unopposed for the June 24, 2008 Republican Primary and won the three-way November 4, 2008 General election with 9,199 votes (71.9%) against Democratic nominee Ted Hallisey and returning 2006 Constitution challenger Allison Howes.
- 2010 Noel was unopposed for both the June 22, 2010 Republican Primary and the November 2, 2010 General election, winning with 8,672 votes.
- 2012 Noel was unopposed for the June 26, 2012 Republican Primary and won the November 6, 2012 General election with 9,600 votes (72%) against Utah Justice Party candidate Ty Markham.
- 2014 Noel was unopposed for both the Republican convention and the November 4, 2014 general election.

During the 2016 legislative session, Noel served as the chair of the House Rules Committee, along with serving on the Natural Resources, Agriculture, and Environmental Quality Appropriations Subcommittee, the House Education Committee, the House Ethics Committee, the Native American Legislative Liaison Committee, and the House Natural Resources, Agriculture, and Environment Committee. During the interim, he served on the House Education Interim Committee and the Natural Resources, Agriculture, and Environment Interim Committee. Noel is also a member of the State Water Development Commission.

== 2016 Sponsored Legislation ==
Bill number	Bill name	Bill status
HB0123	Office of Attorney General - Conflict of Interest	House/ filed - 3/10/2016
HB0232	Scenic Byway Amendments	Governor Signed - 3/22/2016
HB0266S01	Unclaimed Capital Credits Amendments	Governor Signed - 3/28/2016
HB0268S01	Attorney General Employment Amendments	House/ filed - 3/10/2016
HB0270	Constitutional Defense Restricted Account Amendments	Governor Signed - 3/29/2016
HB0276S01	Utah Public Land Management Act	Governor Signed - 3/28/2016
HB0281	Bigamy Offense Amendments	House/ filed - 3/10/2016
HB0363	Grazing Zone Amendments	Governor Signed - 3/21/2016
HB0367	National Forest Road Obstructions	House/ filed - 3/10/2016
HB0391	Law Enforcement Revisions	Governor Signed - 3/29/2016
HB0479S01	Jail Contracting Rate Amendments	Governor Signed - 3/22/2016
HCR001	Concurrent Resolution on Waters of the United States	Governor Signed - 3/1/2016
HR0002	House Resolution—Rules Committee Process	House/ to Lieutenant Governor - 2/26/2016

Representative Noel also floor sponsored SB0258 Distribution of Local Sales Tax Revenue, SJR007 Joint Rules Resolution on Committee Bills, and SJR015 Joint Rules Resolution -- Conference Committees.
