= Accession day =

Anniversary of a leader's taking office or a territory's joining another

An accession day is usually the anniversary of the date on which a monarch or executive takes office. The earliest records of accession celebrations date from the reign of Emperor Kanmu of Japan (r. 781–806), and the custom is now observed in many nations.

== Belgium ==
In Belgium there are local celebrations of the reigning monarch's accession, but the anniversary of the accession of the first king of modern Belgium, Leopold I, on 21 July 1831, is celebrated as a full national holiday, known as the Belgian National Day.

== Indian subcontinent ==
Accession Day in India's Jammu and Kashmir commemorates the day in 1947 when the area joined the Dominion of India. It is a state holiday commemorating 26 October 1947, when Maharaja Hari Singh signed off the Instrument of Accession, in which Jammu and Kashmir joined the Dominion of India. This was part of the series of events in 1947 by which rule the British Raj was converted into the two new independent Dominions of India and Pakistan, the latter having two territories separated by the whole of northern India. As a Hindu ruler of a state with both Hindu and Muslim subjects, the Maharaja's decision was crucial.

Festivities of the day include holding rallies, lighting firecrackers, singing India's national anthem, and raising the flag of India.

== Morocco ==
The present accession day of the Moroccan monarch is on 30 July, the date in 1999 when King Mohammed VI was enthroned following the death of his father. The day is marked by several official and civilian celebrations, including a televised speech from the king.

== Netherlands ==
Koninginnedag (Queen's Day) was, during the reign of Queen Beatrix, celebrated on 30 April, the date of her accession in 1980 upon the abdication of her mother, Queen Juliana, whose birthday fell on 30 April). Beatrix abdicated on Koninginnedag 2013, which led to the accession of King Willem-Alexander. As a result, the holiday became known as Koningsdag (King's Day) from 2014 and the celebration was moved three days ahead to 27 April, to instead mark the birthday of Willem-Alexander.

== United Arab Emirates ==
The United Arab Emirates is unusual in celebrating the accession of its president, although the president is elected from amongst the seven hereditary emirs (ruling princes) of the constituent states of the UAE, and is therefore also a hereditary and monarchical leader. Accession Day is a national holiday in the UAE.

== United Kingdom ==
The custom of marking this day was inaugurated during the reign of Queen Elizabeth I of England in celebration of her restoration of Protestantism as the state religion. Elizabeth's accession day was celebrated in England during her reign and also, according to the 19th-century historian Thomas Lathbury, during the reigns of her successors. A "Form of Prayer and Thanksgiving" to be used in churches on the anniversary of the queen's accession was published in 1576 and used until 1602.

In 1568, the tenth anniversary of Queen Elizabeth's accession was marked with the ringing of bells and 17 November became known as "Queen Elizabeth's Day" or "Queene's Day". As her reign progressed, it was celebrated with increased fervour and, long after her death, it continued to be observed as a day of Protestant rejoicing and expression of anti-Catholic feeling. The observances included triumphal parades and processions, sermons against populism and the burning of the Pope in effigy. After the Great Fire of London (1666), "these rejoicings were converted into a satirical saturnalia of the most turbulent kind"; the greatest excesses occurred in the years 1679–81 when wealthy members of political clubs paid for processions and bonfires to arouse the populace to political fervour. The inhabitants of Berry Pomeroy in south Devon reinstated the tradition of Queene's Day in 2005 with a special church service and bonfire.

On the accession of King James I of England, a form of prayer and thanksgiving was issued for use in all churches "upon his entry to this kingdom". In 1625, a new service was issued which was sanctioned by Convocation in 1640 but set aside by Parliament at the Restoration when certain parts of it were included in the special service for 29 May. When King James II acceded the throne, he ordered the preparation of a special form of prayer and thanksgiving for the anniversary of his accession day and a revised version of the old service was prepared and set forth by authority in 1685. The form of words "the day on which His Majesty began his happy reign" was first used in this service and has been retained ever since. After falling out of use during the reigns of William III and Mary II, the service was revised and used again during the reign of Queen Anne. King George V's accession day (r. 1910–36) was 6 May. King George VI's (r. 1936–1952) was on 11 December. Queen Elizabeth II's (r. 1952–2022) was on 6 February.

The present monarch, Charles III's, accession day is 8 September. Accession day is observed in the United Kingdom by the flying of specific flags and various official functions. In London, a Royal Salute is fired by the guns of the King's Troop, Royal Horse Artillery in Green Park and by the Honourable Artillery Company at the Tower of London. Salutes are also fired at Woolwich, Colchester, Edinburgh Castle, Stirling Castle, Cardiff, Belfast, York, Portsmouth, Plymouth and Dover Castle.

Special services are required by canon in all cathedrals, churches, and chapels of the Church of England. The Book of Common Prayer provides options for a stand-alone Accession Day service, or for special propers by which any or all of the services of Matins, Evensong and Holy Communion may be altered for the day. The Church's more recent prayer book Common Worship does not provide a full form of service, but refers the user to the Book of Common Prayer; it does, however, provide propers for the Eucharist on Accession Day. Although not a legal requirement, special services are also held in some churches of other denominations. Divine Worship: The Missal provides the following Collect for use at Masses, Mattins, and Evensong in the Catholic Personal Ordinariate of Our Lady of Walsingham:

O GOD, who providest for thy people by thy power, and rulest over them in love: vouchsafe so to bless thy Servant our King (Queen); that under him (her) this nation may be wisely governed, and grant that he (she) being devoted to thee with his (her) whole heart, and persevering in good works unto the end, may, by thy guidance, come to thine everlasting kingdom; through Jesus Christ thy Son our Lord, who liveth and reigneth with thee, in the unity of the Holy Spirit, ever one God, world without end. Amen.

== Vatican City ==
The Vatican counts the Anniversario dell'Elezione del Santo Padre, or the anniversary of the election of the reigning pontiff, among its statutory public holidays. Since 2026, the city-state has observed this holiday on 8 May, the anniversary of Pope Leo XIV's election in 2025.

== See also ==
- Accession Council
- Accession Day tilt
- Coronation Day
- Dies Imperii and Decennalia, the equivalent anniversaries under the Roman Empire
- National day
