= Senator Hatcher =

Senator Hatcher may refer to:

- Kirk Hatcher (born 1964/65), Alabama State Senate
- Martin Hatcher (1927–2023), Colorado State Senate
- Tom Hatcher (politician) (born 1958), Tennessee State Senate

== See also ==
- Senator Hatch (disambiguation)
