= Hratch =

Hratch is an Armenian given name. Notable people with the name include:

- Hratch Kozibeyokian (born 1951), Armenian American expert on oriental rugs
- Hratch Zadourian (born 1969), Lebanese former racing cyclist

== See also ==
- Hatch (disambiguation)
