= Evelyn Hatch =

English author and editor

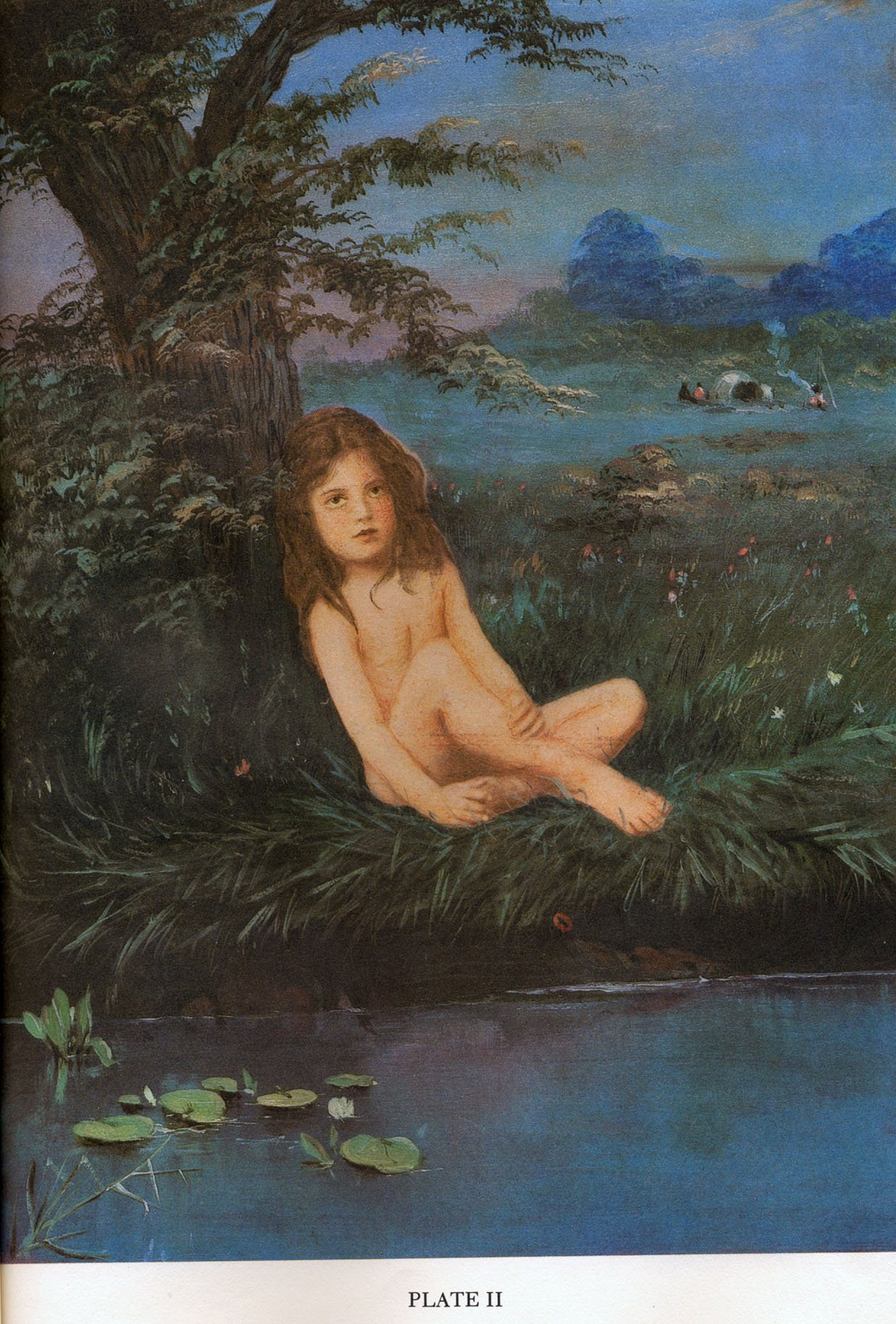
- Evelyn Hatch as a gypsy, photographed by Charles Lutwidge Dodgson
- Born: Evelyn Maud Hatch; 1874
- Died: February 1951 (aged 79–80)
- Occupations: Author, editor
- Known for: Association with Lewis Carroll
- Parent(s): Evelyn and Edwin Hatch
- Relatives: Beatrice Hatch (sister); Ethel Hatch (sister)

Evelyn Hatch (1871 or 1874 – 1951) was an English author, editor, and child friend of the adult Charles Lutwidge Dodgson, better known by his pen name of Lewis Carroll. She was the subject of photographs by Dodgson and is often part of the contemporary discussion about Dodgson's relationship with young female children.

She also acted as editor for a book of Dodgson's letters after his death called A Selection From The Letters Of Lewis Carroll To His Child-Friends. Apart from her association and work with Dodgson, she authored Burgundy: Past and Present, which was well received.

== Biography ==
=== Early life ===
Evelyn Maud Hatch was born in 1871 or 1874 to Edwin and Bessie Hatch. She was baptized on 22 March 1874. Edwin Hatch was a theologian; author; a vice-principal of St. Mary Hall, Oxford; and later a university reader in Ecclesiastical history. Evelyn had two sisters, Beatrice and Ethel Charlotte. She also had a brother named Arthur Herbert Hatch (b. 1864), who was House Prefect at his school, Malvern College. The Hatch family moved in "stimulating circles", including friendships with Edward Burne-Jones, Algernon Charles Swinburne and William Morris.

The family lived in a Gothic-style house built in 1867 on Banbury Road in Norham Gardens, North Oxford, England. The house was described as having "arched windows, a tower, and a turret complete with a statue niche towards the top." Neighborhood friends included Julia and Ethel Huxley, daughters of Thomas Henry Huxley and the aunts of Aldous Huxley. Other acquaintances in the neighborhood who visited the Hatch family included Bonamy Price, Mark Pattison, and Benjamin Jowett.

Evelyn attended the Oxford High School, Oxford for girls, where she participated in extracurricular activities, including acting. In 1879, Evelyn acted in the school's production of A Midsummer Night's Dream, playing Cobweb, a fairie.

=== Relationship with Dodgson ===
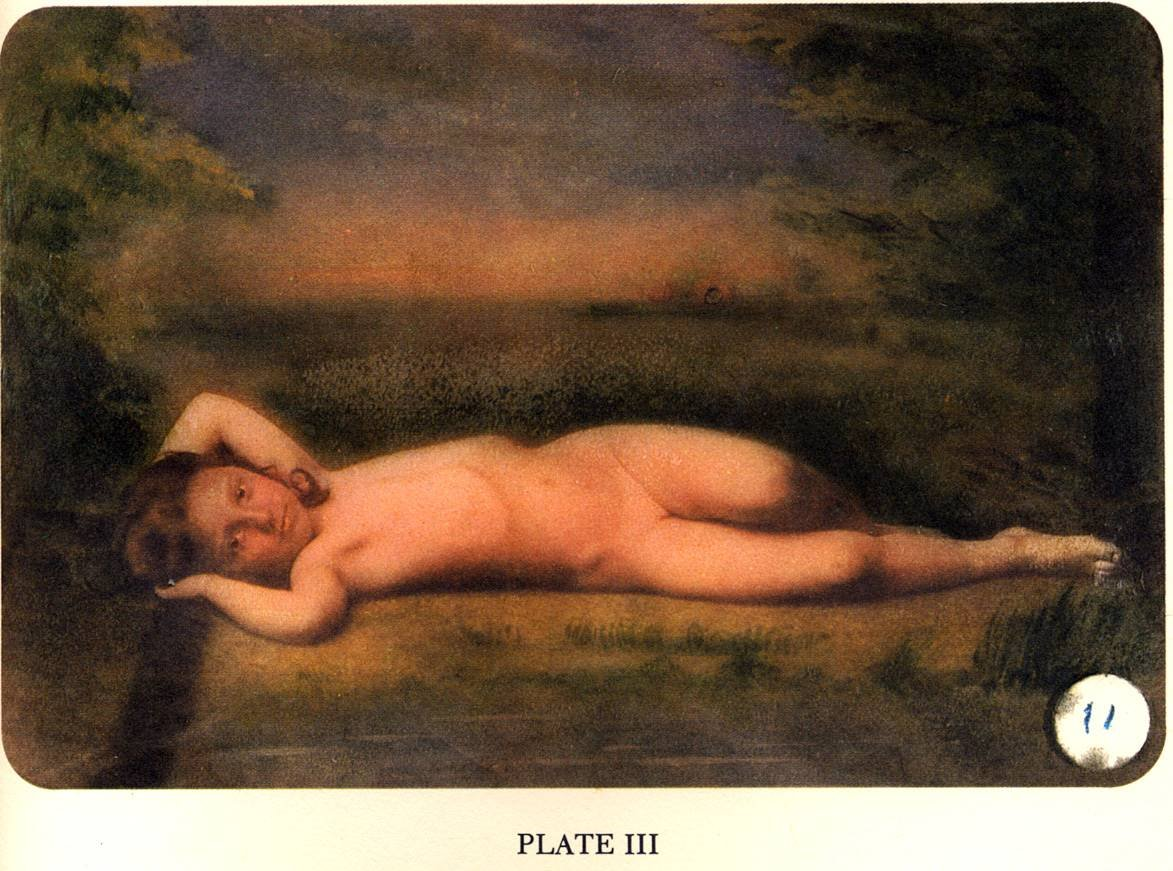
Evelyn Hatch, as photographed by Dodgson on July 29, 1879. Colored by Anne Lydia Bond on Dodgson's instructions.

Evelyn, along with her sisters, was introduced to Dodgson through mutual acquaintances. Dodgson cultivated "the friendship of many little girls", often photographing them. Dodgson's friendships with these children focused on upper-middle-class families, making sure "he did not seek very low-class children as friends." Evelyn's family were of an upper middle class station and they became friends with Dodgson.

Both Evelyn and her older sister Beatrice were muses of Dodgson who were each photographed clothed and nude. Their mother had given permission to Dodgson to photograph the girls and Dodgson was considered a family friend. Beatrice, rather than Evelyn, was considered the "long term favorite of Dodgson." Dodgson's friendship with Evelyn continued for a number of years, however, lasting until his death when Evelyn was in adulthood. The photograph to the left was taken by Dodgson and is of Evelyn at age 8.

Dodgson journaled about dreams he had of Evelyn, which author Kym Brindle dissects in her book Epistolary Encounters in Neo-Victorian Fiction: Diaries and Letters. He also gave Evelyn many gifts, including cards, a wind-up bear, fourteen musical boxes, trips to the theatre and other outings. It was not uncommon for Dodgson to take Evelyn on trips or other outings that lasted overnight or for a weekend.

=== Adult life ===
After their father died in 1889, Evelyn and her sisters were granted a pension from the government for his service.

In 1897, Evelyn acted as a bridesmaid to Dorothy Maud Mary Kitchin, daughter of the Rev. George Kitchin and sister of Alexandra Kitchin. Dorothy married the Rev. John Lionel Shirley Dampier Bennett, M.A. at the Durham Cathedral on 7 October 1897.

In 1927, Evelyn released a book she had written titled Burgundy: Past and Present, a historical tour of the Burgundy region of France, with the account being lauded as "readable, erudite, authoritative" and mentioned for covering out of the way places.

After Dodgson's death and in her adulthood, Evelyn edited a book of Dodgson's letters called A Selection From The Letters Of Lewis Carroll To His Child-Friends. She also included notes throughout and an introduction. The New York Times also listed Hatch and her sister Beatrice in attendance at an event that the Carroll Foundation put on called "Alice 125".

== Retrospective analysis ==
The reclining photograph of Evelyn was included in Britain's Tate Gallery 2014 show called Exposed: The Victorian Nude.

In R. Nichole Rougeau's 2005 dissertation, she writes of the gypsy photograph of Evelyn (upper right):

"Evelyn symbolizes a form of the Blakean child, not really existing in the society depicted by the gypsy camp in the upper right of the photograph. Instead she is a part of the landscape, leaning against what could be interpreted as the tree of knowledge. She seeks knowledge about her sexuality and her eventual move away from the water of her youth to the society of the camp behind her. In calling her a “gypsy” Carroll infers the child is in a perpetual state of movement, belonging neither to society nor completely to nature. He blurs her nipples and has her cross her legs again to hide genitalia and to suggest he is not commenting on the child's reproductive ability, but her innocent sexuality. In picturing her this way, he strips her of her naturalness. She is not a true child, but a fictional one, Carroll's ideal, the woman child who will never have sex."
