= Robert Hatch =

Robert Hatch may refer to:

- Rob Hatch, cycling commentator
- Robert Hatch (game designer)
- Robert McConnell Hatch (1910–2009), suffragan bishop of the Episcopal Diocese of Connecticut
- Robert W. Hatch (1924–2010), American football player and coach
- Robert Hatch, character in The Alibi
- Robert Hatch, character in Escape to Victory

== See also ==
- Bob Hatch (1879–1944), football coach
- Ruth and Robert Hatch Jr. House, a historic house in Wellfleet, Massachusetts
