= University Hall =

University Hall may refer to:

- Original name of Clare College, Cambridge
- Flinders University Hall
- University Hall (Bristol)
- University Hall (Brown University)
- University Hall (Dublin)
- University Hall (Harvard University)
- University Hall (Leuven)
- University Hall (Indiana State University)
- University Hall (Northwestern University)
- University Hall (Ohio State University)
- University Hall (University of Canterbury)
- University Hall (University of Hong Kong)
- University Hall (University of Illinois Chicago)
- University Hall (University of Montana)
- University Hall (University of Oregon)
- University Hall (University of St Andrews)
- University Hall (University of Toledo)
- University Hall (University of Virginia)
- University Hall (Uppsala University)
- University Hall, within University of Western Australia
- University Hall, Gordon Square, London
- University Hall, within Kwame Nkrumah University of Science and Technology, Ghana
