= Beatrice Hatch =

Muse of Lewis Carroll (1866–1947)

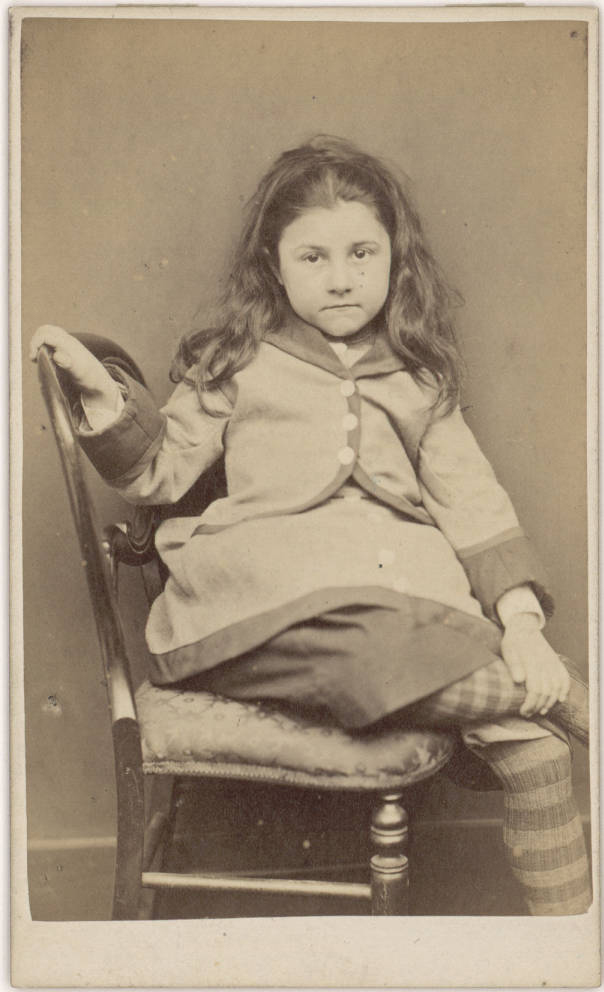
- Photograph by Lewis Carroll, c. 1874
- Born: Beatrice Sheward Hatch; 24 September 1866; Hamilton, Ontario, Canada
- Died: 20 December 1947 (aged 81); Wandsworth, London, England
- Education: Oxford High School, Oxford
- Known for: Association with Lewis Carroll
- Parent(s): Evelyn and Edwin Hatch
- Relatives: Evelyn Hatch (sister); Ethel Hatch (sister)

Beatrice Sheward Hatch (24 September 1866 – 20 December 1947) was an English muse of Charles Lutwidge Dodgson, better known as Lewis Carroll. She was one of a select few children that Dodgson photographed naked, therefore making Hatch the subject of much contemporary study and speculation. Photographs of Hatch still inspire artistic work in contemporary times.

== Early life ==
Beatrice Sheward Hatch was born in 1866 to Edwin Hatch and Evelyn Hatch. Edwin Hatch was a theologian; author; a vice-principal of St. Mary Hall, Oxford; and later a university reader in Ecclesiastical history. Beatrice had two younger sisters, being Ethel and Evelyn, the latter presumably being named after her mother. She also had a brother named Arthur Herbert Hatch (b. 1864), who was House Prefect at his school, Malvern College. The Hatch family moved in "stimulating circles", including friendships with Edward Burne-Jones, Algernon Charles Swinburne and William Morris.

The family lived in a Gothic-style house built in 1867 on Banbury Road in Norham Gardens, North Oxford, England. The house was described as having "arched windows, a tower, and a turret complete with a statue niche towards the top." Neighborhood friends included Julia and Ethel Huxley, daughters of Thomas Henry Huxley and the aunts of Aldous Huxley. Other acquaintances in the neighbourhood who visited the Hatch family included Bonamy Price, Mark Pattison, and Benjamin Jowett.

Beatrice attended Oxford High School, Oxford, a day school for girls in Oxfordshire. While there, she acted in plays, as well as arranged texts for dramatic presentations.

== Relationship with Dodgson ==
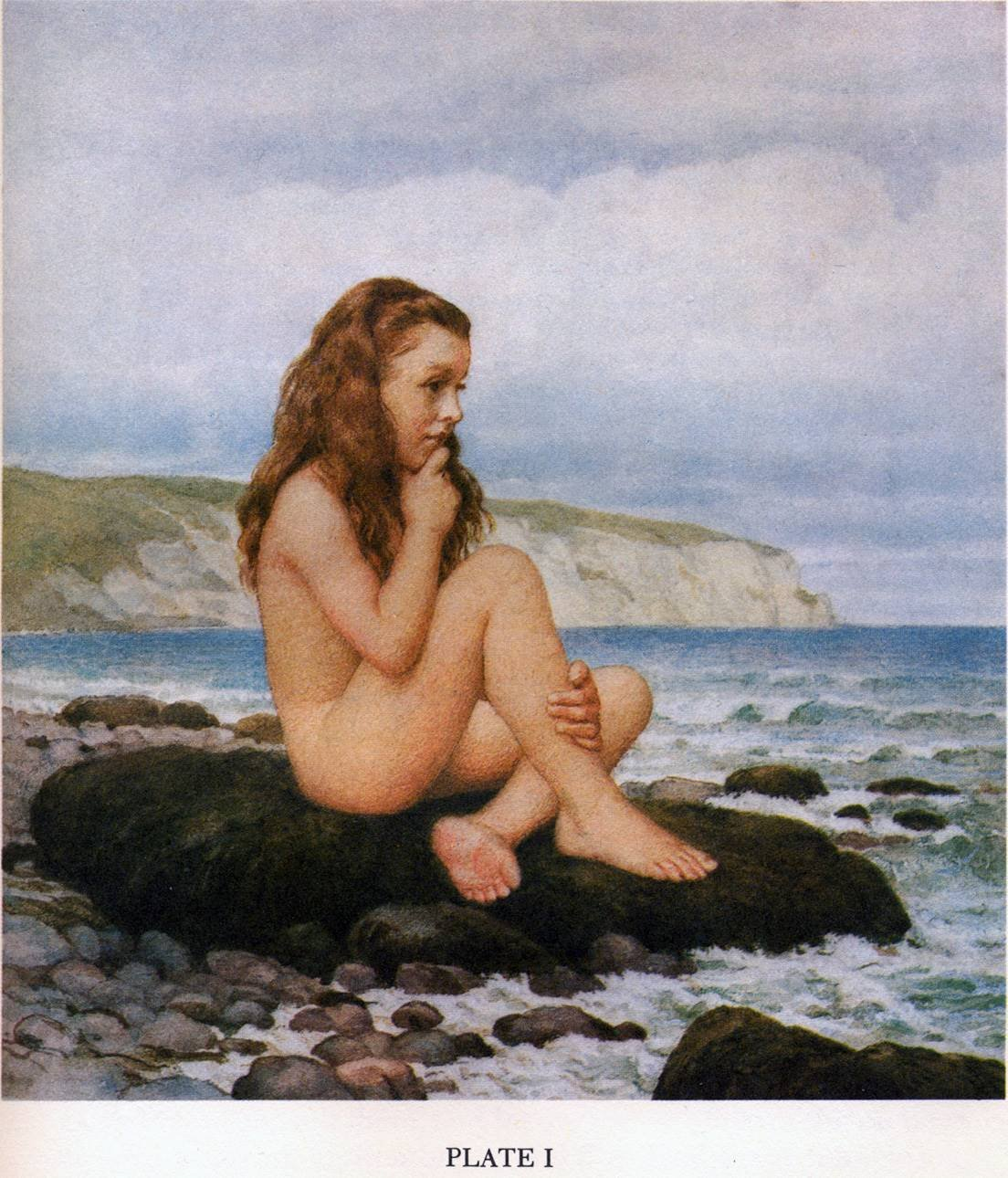
Hand-colored photograph of Beatrice Hatch by Dodgson, 1873

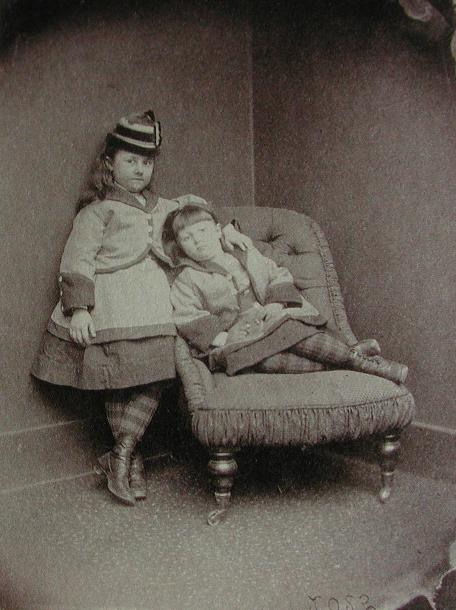
Beatrice and Ethel, taken by Dodgson in his Christ Church Studio on 24 March 1874

Beatrice, along with her sisters, were introduced to Dodgson through mutual acquaintances. Dodgson cultivated "the friendship of many little girls", often photographing them. Dodgson's friendships with these children focused on upper-middle-class families, making sure "he did not seek very low-class children as friends."

After their introduction, Beatrice was said to be "a long term favorite of Dodgson." Dodgson referred to Beatrice as "Bee" sometimes and started photographing her naked around the age of 5. These sessions were undertaken with the permission from Mrs. Hatch, who was in full knowledge of the activities. Modern writers have speculated at the relationship Dodgson had with the girls, but during that time period photographing young girls was seen as innocent and free from sexual connotations. The Hatch family would remain friends with Dodgson for over two decades until his death.

Beatrice acted in the stage play Much Ado About Nothing along with Dame Ellen Terry, both under the direction of Dodgson. Terry played the part of Beatrice, the niece of Leonato. Acting on the name similarities, Terry signed a photograph of herself and sent it to Beatrice, writing "From Beatrice to Beatrice."

== Contemporary art ==
Dodgson's photograph of Beatrice has inspired artists in contemporary times. Polixeni Papapetrou photographed her daughter Olympia Nelson in the same position and style with a photograph called 'Olympia as Lewis Carroll's Beatrice Hatch before White Cliffs.' The photograph was featured on the July 2008 cover of Art Monthly Australia. Papapetrou was heavily criticised for the photograph, with some people calling it "pornographic". The police seized the photo of Olympia, along with other photos, from the gallery showing them in Sydney. After two weeks the photos were returned, but criticisms have been ongoing.

== Later life ==
Upon their father's death in 1889, Beatrice and sisters Ethel and Evelyn were the beneficiaries of patronage from Robert Gascoyne-Cecil, 5th Marquess of Salisbury.

Hatch wrote her memories of Dodgson when she was an adult, as did other "child friends" Ethel Arnold and Ethel Rowel.
