= Coronation Day =

Anniversary of the coronation of a monarch

Coronation Day is the day of the formal crowning of a monarch or its anniversary as observed as an annual commemoration or festival. The name is also frequently used for accession days, the dates or anniversaries of the formal assumption of rule in ceremonies that do not involve a crown.

Nation	Monarch	Date
Cambodia	Norodom Sihamoni	29 October 2004
Thailand	Vajiralongkorn	4 May 2019
United Kingdom	Charles III	6 May 2023
Ethiopia	Haile Selassie	2 November 1930

== See also ==
- Accession day
- Coronation of the British monarch
- Coronation of the Danish monarch
- Coronation of the Holy Roman Empire
- Dies imperii and decennalia, the equivalent holidays observed in the Roman Empire
