= Daniel Conner Lathbury =

British newspaper editor and writer

- Born: 11 April 1831; Wootton, Northamptonshire, England
- Died: 14 June 1922 (aged 91); Hascombe, Surrey, England
- Education: King's College, London, Brasenose College, Oxford
- Occupations: Newspaper editor and writer

Daniel Conner Lathbury (11 April 1831 – 14 June 1922) was an English newspaper editor, journalist and writer.

== Early life ==
He was born in Wootton, near Northampton, the eldest son of Thomas Lathbury, a cleric and ecclesiastical historian, and was educated at King's College, London and Brasenose College, Oxford, graduating in 1854. He entered Lincoln's Inn to study law and was called to the bar in 1858 but never practiced law.

== Career ==
Instead he took up journalism, working for the Daily News before 1861, was involved at Action's Chronicle and then joined the Saturday Review. He moved to The Economist, becoming its joint editor in 1878. In 1883 he succeeded Martin Sharpe as editor of the Guardian, the weekly high church Anglican newspaper, which he edited for 16 years until his dismissal in 1899 for his unfashionable political and ecclesiastical views.

In 1900 he started his own newspaper, the Pilot, which folded for financial reasons after 4 years and concentrated thereafter on writing. He spent the next few years on his best-known book, editing Gladstones Correspondence on Church and Religion.

== Personal life ==
He died at his country cottage at Hascombe, Surrey in 1922. He had married in 1868 Bertha Penrose Price, the youngest daughter of Professor Bonamy Price. Their daughter, Mary, married Jonathan Christie.
