= Richard Moore (journalist) =

Scottish journalist (1973–2022)

- Born: 7 May 1973; Edinburgh, Scotland
- Died: 28 March 2022 (aged 48)
- Other names: The Buffalo, Vern
- Occupations: Journalist, author, podcaster, racing cyclist
- Agent: David Luxton

Richard Moore (7 May 1973 – 28 March 2022) was a Scottish journalist, author, podcaster, and racing cyclist.

== Biography ==
Moore represented Great Britain at the Tour of Langkawi and Scotland at the PruTour and the 1998 Commonwealth Games, where he competed in the road race and the time trial.

He was one of the most established cycling journalists around in his day. Moore has contributed to Rouleur Magazine, Scotland on Sunday, The Herald, Sunday Herald, The Guardian, Sunday Times, and The Scotsman. His first book was a biography of the cyclist Robert Millar; In Search of Robert Millar won the "Best Biography" category at the 2008 British Sports Book Awards. His second book, Heroes, Villains & Velodromes: Chris Hoy and Britain's Track Cycling Revolution, was published in June 2008. His 2012 book The Dirtiest Race in History: Ben Johnson, Carl Lewis and the Seoul Olympic 100m Final (Wisden Sports Writing), was published in June 2012 and long-listed for the William Hill Sports Book of the Year.

In 2013, Moore launched The Cycling Podcast, with Lionel Birnie and Daniel Friebe. Initially covering the 2013 Tour de France, the podcast has since expanded into a weekly show with several spin-offs, and more frequent daily podcasts during major events such as the Grand Tours. The podcast has received several awards and nominations, including being given best podcast at the 2016 Cycling Media Awards, and receiving a bronze medal in sports podcast category at the British Podcast Awards in 2018 and, for the Cycling Podcast Feminin spin-off (also co-hosted by Moore) in 2019. As part of a collective of contributors to The Cycling Podcast, Moore is coauthor of two further books published in 2018 and 2019.

Moore died on Monday, 28 March 2022 at his home in Picardy.

== Bibliography ==
- In Search of Robert Millar, HarperCollins, September 2007, ISBN 978-0-00-723501-8
- Heroes, Villains & Velodromes: Chris Hoy and Britain's Track Cycling Revolution, HarperCollins, June 2008, ISBN 978-0-00-726531-2
- Sky's the Limit: British Cycling's Quest to Conquer the Tour de France, HarperCollins, June 2011, ISBN 978-0-00-734183-2
- Slaying the Badger: LeMond, Hinault and the Greatest Ever Tour de France, Yellow Jersey, May 2011, ISBN 978-0-224-08290-7, ISBN 978-1-934030-87-5
- Tour de France 100: A Photographic History of the World's Greatest Race, VeloPress, June 2013, ISBN 978-1-937715-06-9
- Étape: 20 Great Stages from the Modern Tour de France, VeloPress, June 2014, ISBN 978-1-937715-30-4
- The Dirtiest Race in History: Ben Johnson, Carl Lewis and the Seoul Olympic 100m Final, Wisden Sports Writing, June 2012, ISBN 978-1-4081-3595-2
- The Bolt Supremacy: Inside Jamaica’s Sprint Factory, Yellow Jersey Press, July 2015, ISBN 978-0224092302
- A Journey Through the Cycling Year, Moore, Richard; Birnie, Lionel; Friebe, Daniel. Yellow Jersey Press, 2018 ISBN 1787290263
- The Grand Tour Diaries 2018/19, Moore, Richard; Birnie, Lionel; Friebe, Daniel; Thomazeau, Francois; Chennaoui, Orla. Vision Sports Publishing Ltd, Nov 2019 ISBN 978-1909534995
