= James T. Lloyd =

American politician (1857–1944)

James Tilghman Lloyd
- Portrait of Lloyd in 1905

Member of the U.S. House of Representatives from Missouri's 1st district
- In office June 1, 1897 – March 3, 1917
- Preceded by: Charles Nelson Clark
- Succeeded by: Milton A. Romjue

Chair of the Democratic Congressional Campaign Committee
- In office 1909–1913
- Preceded by: James M. Griggs
- Succeeded by: Frank E. Doremus

Personal details
- Born: August 28, 1857 Canton, Missouri
- Died: April 3, 1944 (aged 86) Quincy, Illinois
- Party: Democratic
- Education: Christian University
- Occupation: lawyer

James Tilghman Lloyd (August 28, 1857 – April 3, 1944) was a Democratic member of the U.S. House of Representatives from Missouri from 1897 to 1917. He served as the House minority whip between 1901 and 1909.

Lloyd was born in Canton, Missouri, where he attended the public schools, and later graduated from Christian University (today Culver-Stockton College) in Canton. He taught school, was a deputy sheriff of Lewis County from 1879 to 1881, and deputy circuit clerk and recorder from 1880 to 1882. He studied law, was admitted to the bar in 1882, and started a practice in Monticello, before moving to Shelbyville in 1885. He was prosecuting attorney of Shelby County from 1889 to 1893.

Lloyd was elected as a Democrat to the Fifty-fifth Congress in a special election caused by the death of Representative-elect Richard P. Giles, and was reelected nine additional times. In Congress, he served as Democratic whip in the Fifty-seventh through Sixtieth Congresses, and chairman of the Committee on Accounts in the Sixty-second through Sixty-fourth Congresses. In 1916, he led the effort to pass the Lloyd–La Follette Act to provide federal employees with whistleblower protections. In party politics, he was a delegate to the 1908 Democratic National Convention, and served as chairman of the Democratic Congressional Campaign Committee from 1909 to 1913, during which time his party gained a majority in the House of Representatives.

After retiring from Congress in 1917, Lloyd remained in Washington, D.C., where he practiced law. He was president of the board of education in 1924 and 1925 and president of the chamber of commerce in 1925. He returned to Canton in 1925 and continued his law practice and was a member of the board of curators of Culver-Stockton College. He died in Quincy, Illinois, on April 3, 1944, and was buried in Forest Grove Cemetery in Canton.

U.S. House of Representatives
Preceded by Charles Nelson Clark	Member of the U.S. House of Representatives from Missouri's 1st congressional district 1897–1917	Succeeded by Milton A. Romjue
Party political offices
Preceded by Oscar Underwood	House Democratic Whip; 1901–1908	Succeeded by Thomas Montgomery Bell
