= General Hatch =

General Hatch may refer to:

- Edward Hatch (1832–1889), Union Army brevet major general
- Everard Enos Hatch (1859–1940), U.S. Army brigadier general
- Henry J. Hatch (born 1935), U.S. Army lieutenant general
- Henry James Hatch (1869–1931), U.S. Army brigadier general
- John Porter Hatch (1822–1901), Union Army brevet major general
- Monroe W. Hatch Jr. (born 1933), U.S. Air Force four-star general
