= Stephensburg, Kentucky =

Unincorporated community in Kentucky, United States

- Unincorporated community
- Location within Kentucky Location within the United States
- Coordinates: 37°37′29″N 86°01′08″W
- Country: United States
- State: Kentucky
- County: Hardin
- Elevation: 689 ft (210 m)
- Time zone: UTC-5 (Eastern (EST))
  - Summer (DST): UTC-4 (EDT)
- Area codes: 270 & 364
- GNIS feature ID: 504342

Stephensburg is an unincorporated community in Hardin County, Kentucky, United States.

== Notable people ==
- Richard P. Giles, Missouri politician, was born in Stephensburg.
