= William Hatch =

William Hatch may refer to:

- William Hatch (theologian) (William Henry Paine Hatch, 1875–1972), American theologian
- William Hatch (bellfounder), 17th-century bellfounder in Kent, England
- William H. Hatch (William Henry Hatch, 1833–1896), U.S. Representative from Missouri
- William Hatch (New Hampshire politician), member of the New Hampshire House of Representatives
- William Riley Hatch, American singer and actor
