= The Cycling Podcast =

Podcast by Audioboom

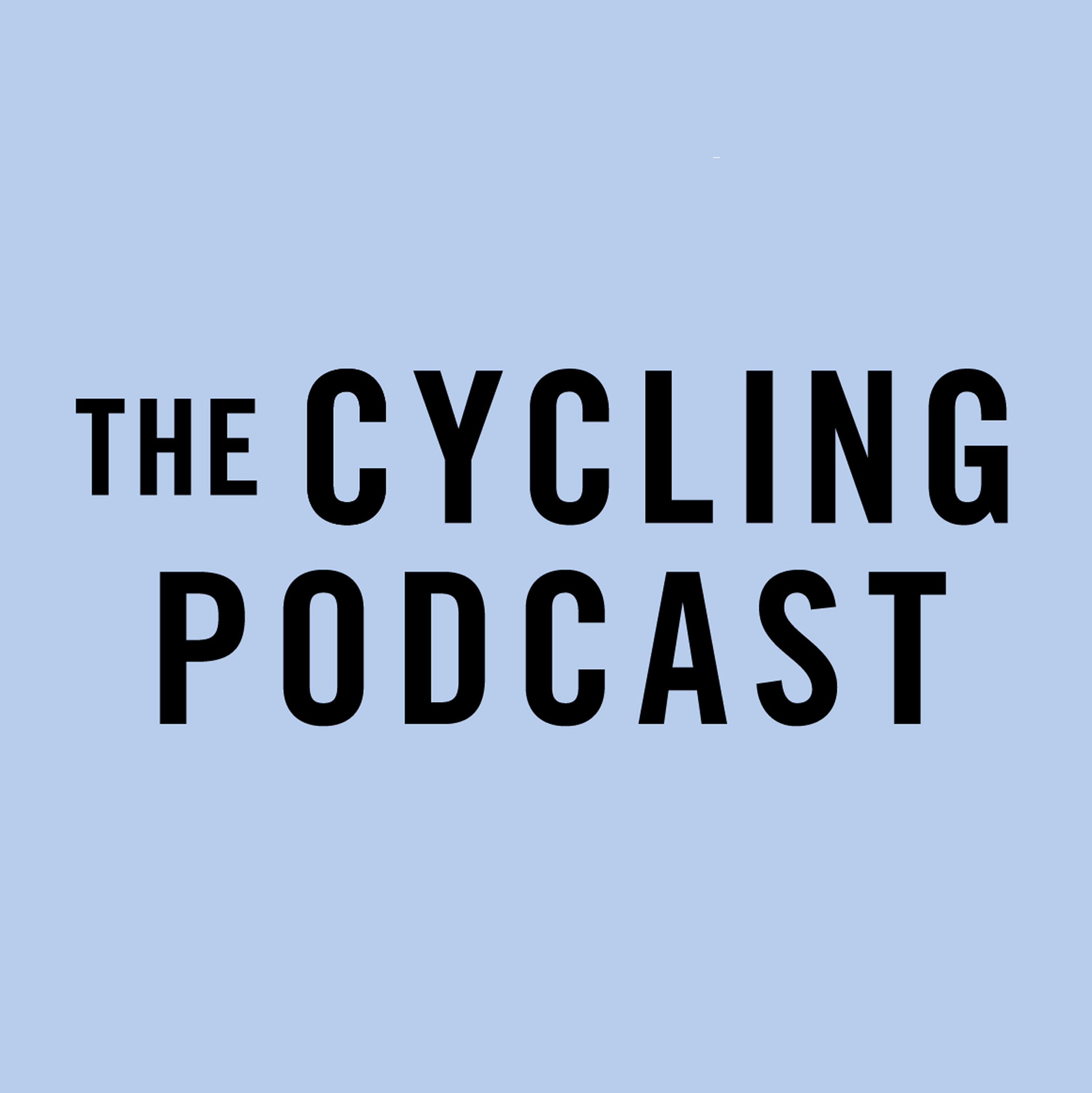
- Genre: Sports
- Language: English

Cast and voices
- Hosted by: Daniel Friebe; Richard Moore (2013-2022); Lionel Birnie; Various

Production
- Production: Jonathan Rowe, Jon Moonie, Tom Whalley, Alex Adey, Paul Scoins, Will Jones, Adam Bowie

Technical specifications
- Audio format: Podcast (via streaming or downloadable MP3)

Publication
- No. of seasons: 12
- No. of episodes: 1468
- Original release: 2013
- Provider: Audioboom
- Updates: Thursday

Reception
- Ratings: 70,000 listeners/week, 48.4 million all-time listens
- Cited for: The Cycling Media Awards Best Podcast 2016, British Podcasting Awards Bronze Medal 2018, British Podcasting Awards Bronze Medal 2019
- Cited as: Top 10 Audio AIPS Sports Media Awards 2018, Top 10 Audio AIPS Sports Media Awards 2019

Related
- Related shows: Kilometre 0 by The Cycling Podcast, The Cycling Podcast Féminin, Explore by The Cycling Podcast
- Website: thecyclingpodcast.com
- Breaking The Story

The Cycling Podcast is an independent sports audio production created by Richard Moore, Lionel Birnie, and Daniel Friebe. Launched in 2013, weekly, hour-long episodes provide insight, analysis and often irreverent take on professional road cycling. Each episode features interviews with different professional cyclists, team staff, and other actors from across the sport. Increased coverage is provided at the Grand Tours (the Giro d'Italia, Tour de France and Vuelta a España) where daily episodes are recorded at the end of each stage. Since launch, the podcast has launched several spin-offs and mini-series—such as The Cycling Podcast Féminin, a monthly edition launched in 2016 which focuses on professional women's cycling. From its launch until 2020, the podcast was also published by the UK broadsheet newspaper, The Telegraph.

== Hosts and contributors ==
Originally co-hosted by Friebe, Moore and Birnie, the podcast has added several contributors and co-presenters as it has grown, and particularly since Moore's death in 2022. Episodes are typically hosted by one or both of Friebe and Bernie, with one or two other co-hosts. During men's Grand Tours, the podcast has daily episodes which are sometimes hosted entirely by guest contributiors.

Episodes of the Cycling Podcast Féminin are typically presented by Rose Manley, with other regular contributors.

As of 2025, current and past regular contributors include François Thomazeau, Ciro Scognamiglio, Fran Reyes, Brian Nygaard, Rob Hatch, Tom Whalley, Lizzy Banks, Ned Boulting, Ian Boswell, Rebecca Charlton, the team at then now-closed VeloNews, Orla Chennaoui, Michele Pelacci, Denny Gray, Mitch Docker, Larry Warbasse, Richard Abrahams, Kate Wagner and Seb Piquet.

== The Cycling Podcast Series ==
- Kilometre 0 by The Cycling Podcast is a recurring series produced at each of the three Grand Tours. The series takes listeners behind the scenes, bringing them the stories from beyond the racing. The title, Kilometre 0, is the official start of a bike race which arrives after the "départ fictif" or neutralized start. The Kilometre 0 title now also includes what were previously Friends of the Podcast Specials, occasional extended features produced exclusively for the show's subscribers
- The Cycling Podcast Féminin is a monthly magazine show covering women's professional road cycling and the UCI Women's World Tour. It is presented by Rose Manley and Denny Gray, with occasional contributions from Orla Chennaoui, Rebecca Charlton and others, as well as previously Richard Moore and Lionel Birnie.
- Explore by The Cycling Podcast a six part series that premiered in 2018 and returned in 2021. It examines the emerging trends of bikepacking, endurance, and ultra-endurance cycling. It was led by Lionel Birnie with Hannah Troop and Tom Whalley.
- Adam Blythe Interviews... by The Cycling Podcast was a six-part series, launched in spring 2019. In each episode, Lotto-Soudal rider Adam Blythe interviews a significant figure from the world of professional cycling.
- Service Course by The Cycling Podcast, published from 2019-2023, is Tom Whalley and Lizzy Banks' show looking at the world of bikes, technology and equipment.
- Life in the Peloton An existing popular podcast that was hosted under the umbrella of The Cycling Podcast for 1 season, presenting by the EF Education First pro cyclist Mitch Docker. Mitch typically interviews unique and interesting characters in the world of professional cycling.

== History ==
The Cycling Podcast began as short audio dispatches from the 2013 Tour de France supported by sponsorship from Sharp. Listener numbers hit 9,000 halfway into the race, which helped secure funding from Jaguar for the following year. In 2015, audience numbers grew to 30,000, and partnerships were developed with The Telegraph and Eurosport. Support from sports nutrition brand Science in Sport saw The Cycling Podcast cover their first Giro d'Italia in 2016 and title sponsorship from cycling lifestyle brand Rapha, secured the future of the podcast for the following two years. Notably, The Cycling Podcast was referenced in the House of Commons Culture, Media and Sport Select Committee's report into Combatting doping in sport.

The Cycling Podcast was the first podcast ever to be accredited to the Tour de France.

The Cycling Podcast has been nominated for several awards since 2016. The podcast was given best podcast at the 2016 Cycling Media Awards. In 2018, The Cycling Podcast was a Bronze medalist in sports podcast category at the British Podcast Awards. It has been renominated in the Sports category in 2019. The Grand Tour Diaries, the second book by the team behind The Cycling Podcast was released in November 2019.

Beginning in 2018, Daniel Friebe became a member of ITV's cycling coverage team for the Tour de France, Vuelta a España and Cirterium du Dauphine, and started appearing on the podcast less frequently during those races. This led to the podcast increasing its use of guest presenters and hosts.

In March 2022, lead presenter Richard Moore died suddenly. In his absence, Birnie and Friebe continued with coverage of cycling's Monuments and Grand Tours, with increased use of guest co-hosts, with regular episodes returning in Autumn 2022. During 2024 Birnie stepped away from regular episodes to focus more on the business side of the podcast, but returned to presenting in 2025.

== Coverage ==
=== Giro d'Italia ===
In 2016, The Cycling Podcast team covered the Giro d'Italia for the first time, thanks to new sponsorship funding from Science in Sport. Italian journalist Ciro Scognamiglio of La Gazzetta dello Sport is a regular contributor during the three-week stage race.

=== Tour de France ===
The Cycling Podcast began as daily dispatches from the Tour de France in 2013. Richard Moore, Lionel Birnie and Daniel Friebe, along with a cast of special guests, have provided analysis and insight from each of the 21 stages of the race every year since. Esteemed French journalist and author François Thomazeau (winner of the 2015 Prix Jacques Goddet) has joined them in their coverage since 2017.

=== Vuelta a España ===
Following the title sponsorship of cycling clothing brand Rapha, The Cycling Podcast added the third Grand Tour to their coverage in August 2016. Spanish cycling journalist and communications manager for Lizarte, Fran Reyes provides insight during the Vuelta a España coverage.

== Support and sponsorship ==
As of 2020, The Cycling Podcast is sponsored by Supersapiens, having until the end of 2019 been sponsored by Rapha and after that by iwoca. It also receives support from Science in Sport. Past sponsors include Allpress Espresso, HumansInvent.com, Sharp, Van Dessel Cycles, British Eurosport, Nederburg Wines, Jaguar, Wellbrix and Hansgrohe showers and taps. The Telegraph is a long standing media partner of The Cycling Podcast.
