= Polixeni Papapetrou =

Australian photographer (1960–2018)

- Polixeni Papapetrou with her works at a 2012 show at Melbourne's Nellie Castan Gallery
- Born: 21 November 1960; Melbourne, Australia
- Died: 11 April 2018 (aged 57); Fitzroy, Victoria, Australia
- Education: PhD, Monash University (2007); MA Media Arts, RMIT University (1997); LLB/ BA, University of Melbourne (1984)
- Alma mater: University of Melbourne
- Known for: Photography
- Notable work: Eden (2016); Lost Psyche (2014); The Ghillies (2013); Between Worlds (2009–2012); Haunted Country (2006); Elvis Immortal (1987–2002)
- Style: Photography, painting, scenic backdrops, landscape, childhood
- Spouse(s): Robert Nelson, art critic, The Age
- Awards: William and Winifred Bowness Photography Prize; 2017; MAMA Art Foundation National Photography Prize; 2016; Windsor Art Prize; 2015; Josephine Ulrick & Win Schubert Photography Award; 2009
- Elected: Centre for Contemporary Photography, Melbourne, Board of Management 1985–2003
- Website: polixenipapapetrou.net

Polixeni Papapetrou (21 November 1960 – 11 April 2018) was an Australian photographer noted for her themed photo series about people's identities. Photo series she has made include Elvis Presley fans, Marilyn Monroe impersonators, drag queens, wrestlers and bodybuilders and the recreation of photographs by Lewis Carroll, using her daughter as a model.

== Early life and career ==
Papapetrou was born in 1960 into a Greek immigrant family in Melbourne. She attended the University of Melbourne, graduating with a degree in Arts and Law in 1984. In 1997, she graduated with a Master of Arts degree from RMIT University and with a PhD from Monash University in 2007. She worked as a lawyer between 1985 and 2001.

== Photography ==
Papapetrou began taking photographs as early as 1987. In her early years, she focused on cultural identity, photographing subcultures including Elvis Presley fans and impersonators, Marilyn Monroe impersonators, drag queens, bodybuilders, circus performers and wrestlers. Later on, she focused on the representation of childhood, with her two children, Olympia Nelson (b 1997), and Solomon Nelson (b 1999), as the main protagonists. Addressing issues of identity and representation, Papapetrou used photography, scenic backdrops, landscapes, costumes, and masks in her work.

=== Early work ===
Although known for her work about childhood identity, Papapetrou has explored other representations of identity. Between 1987 and 2005 Papapetrou photographed Elvis Presley fans and impersonators paying homage to Elvis Presley on the anniversary of his death at the Melbourne General Cemetery. The series, Elvis Immortal, made between 1987 and 2002, portrays Elvis Presley fans paying homage to Elvis on the anniversary of his death. Elvis Immortal was exhibited at the State Library of Victoria (1991), Bendigo Art Gallery, Victoria (1997), Old Treasury, Melbourne (1998), Nellie Castan Gallery, Melbourne (2006) and RMIT Gallery, Melbourne (2007). Her interest in Elvis Presley extended to Marilyn Monroe, a classic female icon that was as influential as Elvis Presley. She made the series Searching for Marilyn (2002). Rather than photograph fans and devotees as in Elvis Immortal, she explored ideas about Marilyn Monroe as a Hollywood creation, existing only as a constructed identity and someone whose identity was constantly changing depending on what was expected of her. Searching for Marilyn was first shown at Monash Gallery of Art (2002) and Nellie Castan Gallery (2006).

In the early to mid-90s Papapetrou photographed wrestlers and bodybuilders at competition events. With an interest in circus life, she photographed at the Silvers and Ashtons circus in Melbourne in the early 90s. She also photographed drag queens at the then Trish's nightclub in North Melbourne and at the Annual Miss Alternative World Ball held at the San Remo Ball room, Melbourne. These early works were featured in the exhibition 'A Performative Paradox' at the Centre for Contemporary Photography Melbourne in 2013.

Between 1995 and 2002, Papapetrou was interested in constructions of identity based on body and dress and explored this theme with images of drag queens and body builders. In Curated Bodies (1996), she reflected on the biological and social constructions of gender. Curated Bodies was shown at the Centre for Contemporary Photography, Melbourne (1996). In Body/Building (1997–2002) she reflected at how body builders were able to transform their body through diet and exercise. She placed images of body builders against images of neo-classical architecture to make the connection between Classical Greek notions of the ideal body and architecture. The photographs were run together to form a frieze that assumed the rhythms of an ancient Greek architectural frieze. Body/Building was exhibited at Australian Centre for Photography, Sydney (1997) and in the exhibition 'Fair Game' at the National Gallery of Victoria, Melbourne (2003).

=== Work about childhood ===
In 2002, Papapetrou began to explore the representation of childhood identity. She has commented that in photographing children she is exploring the condition of childhood in its various guises. Viewing the children as shape-shifters, she is fascinated by their transformative process and how their identity develops, transforms through role-play and morphs as they grow. In the first body of work made with her then four-year daughter (Phantomwise in 2002), Olympia wore a series of masks that concealed her face from above the nose, but allowed her mouth and ears to be revealed. Papapetrou is interested in the transformative and performative function of the mask and how it can move both the subject and photograph from the 'real’ to the 'imaginary’. Phantomwise has been exhibited as Olympia Masked Ballarat Fine Art Gallery (2002), Photographica Australis, Sala De Exposiciones Del Canal De Isabel II, Madrid, Spain (2002), National Gallery of Thailand, Bangkok (2003) and Singapore Art Museum, Singapore (2003).

Papapetrou's series Dreamchild (2003) was based on the 19th century photographs of Charles Dodgson, more commonly known as Lewis Carroll, the author of Alice's Adventures in Wonderland. She was drawn to re-staging Dodgson's photographs because his portrayal of dress up games – the games that children play in everyday life and have often performed for the camera – typified the boundary-crossing experience that occurs in photography. She photographed her daughter Olympia in a variety of dress – Oriental, Middle Eastern, Victorian and other exotic costumes. Dreamchild was exhibited at Bendigo Art Gallery, Victoria (2003) Stills Gallery, Sydney (2004), Monash University Museum of Art, Melbourne (2004), Australian Centre for Photography, Sydney (2005) and 'Le Mois de la Photo’, 9th Montreal Photography Biennale, Montréal (2005).

In the series Wonderland (2004), Papapetrou explored the psychological and physical presence in the fictive role that her daughter steps into. In staging the photographs for Wonderland, Papapetrou borrowed from the tradition of theatre and used scenic backdrops based on the illustrations that appeared in the original publication of Alice's Adventures in Wonderland made by Sir John Tenniel. Wonderland was at shown at Stills Gallery, Sydney (2004), 'Le Mois de la Photo’, 9th Montreal Photography Biennale, Montréal (2005), Bathurst Regional Art Gallery, New South Wales (2005), Monash University Gallery (2006), Te Tuhi Gallery, Manukau City, New Zealand (2007), Roger Williams Contemporary, Auckland (2007) and Warrnambool Art Gallery (2008).

In 2006, Papapetrou moved her work from the realm of fantasy into the natural world. For her it seemed an appropriate move as the children were growing older and their experience of the world was shifting from the imaginative interior world of dress-ups and make-believe into a more pragmatic experience with the world beyond the home. The series Haunted Country, (2006) was inspired by nineteenth century real and fictional accounts of children who went missing in the Australian bush. Papapetrou went to the sites of the most notorious disappearances where she staged and photographed scenes proposing what the physical and psychological circumstances may have been like for these lost and wandering children.

Haunted Country was exhibited at Foley Gallery, New York (2006), Johnston Gallery, Perth (2006), Williams Contemporary, Auckland (2007), Nellie Castan Gallery, Melbourne (2007), The National Art Center, Tokyo (2008), the Museum of Photographic Arts, San Diego (2007), Aperture Foundation, New York (2007), De Cordova Museum and Sculpture Park, Lincoln, Massachusetts (2008) and the McClleland Gallery and Sculpture Park, Victoria (2008).

Games of Consequence (2008) is based on Papapetrou's childhood memories of play, incidents that happened to her and feelings that she experienced growing up. Sensing that the process of growing up in the modern world had changed the exploration of personal individuality seemed a natural next step for her. By exploring her memories of play that occurred in places beyond the home, she wanted to reflect on the freedom that children of her generation enjoyed in these arcane spaces. The series was shown at the National Arts Center, Tokyo (2008), FotoFreo Fremantle Festival of Photography, Perth (2008), Foley Gallery, New York (2008) and Nellie Castan Gallery, Melbourne (2008).

Following the Art Monthly Australia controversy, Papapetrou adopted the practice of covering her subjects' faces. She wanted her photographs of children to move beyond the recognized identity of the subject so she could speak in a more universal way about childhood. By concealing the identity of the wearer with the mask it could expand the reading of the subject as a universal figure, the masked person representing no one in particular, yet anyone or everyone. Papapetrou has used the mask in her work Between Worlds, (2009), The Dreamkeepers (2012), The Ghillies (2013) and Lost Psyche (2014). The disguises, masks and outfits worn by the characters in these pictures change young bodies into old, children into animals or into anthropomorphic figures. Papapetrou exhibited Between Worlds and The Ghilies at Jenkins Johnson Gallery, New York. The Ghillies was featured in the 13th Dong Dong Gang International Photo Festival, South Korea (2014); the European Month of Photography, Athens and Berlin.

In Lost Psyche (2014) Papapetrou evokes a lost past of symbolic roles that are at the end of their place in history. Using painted scenic backdrops, a practice she returns to after 10 years, masks, costumes and child actors, she weighs up the persistence of some historical conditions and the disappearance of others. The lost parts of the psyche are poetically reconstructed through metaphors of childhood – which for adults is also a memory. In 2016 she created the series Eden completing a cycle of photographing her daughter and friends from childhood to adulthood. She wrote that “By reflecting on the changing body of young people as they shed one skin for another, we are embedded in the cycles of life. The seasons of growth, blossoming, and wilting are visibly illustrated in the life cycle of the flower which also highlights our mortality. In ‘Eden’ I used the language of flowers to explore life itself. The girls in the photographs are adorned with floral arrangements to reflect on their metamorphosis from child to adolescent and adolescent to adult, and a oneness with the world, fertility and the cycles of life. The girls are enclosed in a floral embrace that symbolize their unity and acceptance of this miraculous thing we call life.”

== Exhibitions ==
Papapetrou's work on childhood has been widely exhibited in major international photography festivals including: ‘Photolux Festival of Photography’, Lucca (2017); ‘The European Month of Photography’, Berlin (2016); ‘Daegu Photo Biennale, Korea’ (2016); ‘The European Month of Photography, Athens’ (2016), the Dong Gang International Photo Festival, Yeongwol, South Korea (2014); ‘Fotografica Bogota’, Colombia (2013); ‘Photofestival Noorderlicht’, The Netherlands (2012); ‘3rd Biennale Photoqua’i at Le musée du quai Branly, Paris (2011); ‘The Month of Photography, Bratislava (2010); Pingyao International Photography Festival, Pingyao, Shanxi, China (2010); ‘Athens Festival of Photography’ (2010); Fotofreo, Fremantle Festival of Photography, Perth, (2008); ‘Seoul International Photography Festival’, Seoul (2008); ‘Le Mois de la Photo’, Montreal (2005).

== Controversy ==
Papapetrou's photographs of her daughter have caused controversy. In January 2007 Gosford City Council closed the Australian Centre for Photography touring (ACP) exhibition Changeling: Childhood and the Uncanny at Gosford Regional Art Gallery a week early. A blurb, which gallery visitors were advised to read before making judgements, said the poses were "orchestrated by the child herself". In July 2008 Papapetrou's 2003 photograph of her daughter based on Charles Dodgson's photograph of Beatrice Hatch was featured on the July 2008 cover of Art Monthly Australia. Papapetrou came under fire from the then Australian Prime Minister of Australia Kevin Rudd who said that he "couldn't stand this sort of stuff", referring to the photograph of the naked Olympia. Olympia replied that she was offended by what Rudd said, and still defends the picture to this day.

== Illness and death ==
Papapetrou was diagnosed with breast cancer in 2007. She recovered and was given the all-clear, but relapsed five years later. In late 2012, she was told she had just days to live, and moved back home to receive palliative care. She survived for more than five years, and died in April 2018, aged 57.

== Recognition ==
Survey exhibitions of Papapetrou's work were shown at the Australian Centre for Photography, Sydney in 2011 (Tales from Elsewhere) and the Centre for Contemporary Photography Melbourne in 2013 in the exhibition, 'A Performative Paradox'.

== Books ==
- Naomi Rosenblum, A History of Women Photographers, Abbeville Press, New York, 2010
- Anne Marsh, Look: Contemporary Australian Photography, Palgrave MacMillan Australia, 2010
- Anne Higonnet, Rachel Lafo, Kate Dempsey (ed.), Presumed Innocence: Photographic Perspectives of Children, DeCordova Museum and Sculpture Park, Massachusetts, 2008
- Susan McCulloch, The New McCulloch's Encyclopedia of Australian Art, The Meigunyah Press and Australian Art Editions, Melbourne, 2006
- Martha Langford, Mirroring Ourselves, Recasting Otherness, After Alice: Angela Grossman and Polixeni Papapetrou, Image and Imagination, ed. Martha Langford, McGill-Queens University Press, Montreal & Kingston, 2005
- Anne Marsh, The Child and the Archive, The Darkroom: Photography and the Theatre of Desire, Macmillan, Melbourne, 2003
