= Hatching (disambiguation) =

Hatching is an artistic technique for shading. It may also refer to:

- The crosshatch symbol or number sign
- Crossed letter, an overwritten document
- Hatching (heraldry), a system for depicting armory in monochrome
- An animal escaping its egg after incubation

== Film ==
- The Hatching, a 2014 British black horror comedy film
- Hatching (film), a 2022 Finnish horror film

== See also ==
- Hatch (disambiguation)
- Hatchling
- Map symbol; use of hatching and cross-hatching in cartography
