= Senator Hatch (disambiguation) =

Senator Hatch often refers to Orrin Hatch (1934–2022) who was a U.S. Senator from Utah from 1977 to 2019. Senator Hatch may also refer to:

== Members of the United States Senate ==
- Carl Hatch (1889–1963), U.S. Senator from New Mexico from 1933 to 1949

== United States state senate members ==
- A. Gould Hatch (1896–1970), New York State Senate
- Jack Hatch (born 1950), Iowa State Senate
- Pamela Hatch (1948–2023), Maine State Senate
- Thomas V. Hatch (born 1950), Utah State Senate

== See also ==
- Senator Hatcher (disambiguation)
