= Carl H. Smith =

American football coach (1880-1964)

Carl Herring Smith (November 18, 1880 – July 18, 1964) was an American football player, coach, and athletic director at the high school and college level.

Smith was born on November 18, 1880 in Gouverneur, New York. He graduated from the Colgate Academy in 1900 and attended Colgate University, where he was captain of the school's football and basketball teams and was a member of the baseball and track teams.

After graduating, Smith became the athletic director at the MacKenzie School in Dobbs Ferry, New York. From 1911 to 1913, he held the same position at the St. John's Military Academy in Delafield, Wisconsin. He then moved to the Tome School in Port Deposit, Maryland, where he coached football and baseball in addition to serving as athletic director.

After returning to the MacKenzie School for a year, Smith entered the college ranks with St. Lawrence University, where he coached four sports. From 1918 to 1919, he was a military instructor at the Potsdam Normal School. In 1919, Smith was named director of athletics at Bates College. He also taught physiology and hygiene as well as instructing in special summer school courses. He revived Bates' basketball program and coached the school's baseball team to a state championship in 1920. He resigned in 1922 and was succeeded by Oliver Cutts. That fall, Smith became the head men's basketball coach at Middlebury College. He then returned to the high school ranks, first at the Wardlaw School, then at Millburn High School.

Smith died on July 18, 1964 at Muhlenberg Hospital. He was survived by eight of his ten children. His wife, the former Ray Huntington Barns, predeceased him.
