= Henry John Hatch =

- Born: 1818; Chertsey
- Died: 1895 (aged 76–77)
- Occupation: Clergyman

Henry John Hatch (1818–1895) was a British clergyman who was sent to prison for the indecent assault of two female children in his care. Following the conviction for perjury of his main accuser – one of the children – he was granted the Royal Pardon and embarked on a series of court actions to win compensation for wrongful imprisonment.

== Early life ==
Henry John Hatch was born on 2 January 1818 in Chertsey, the second of 12 children of the Reverend Thomas Hatch, vicar of Walton-on-Thames, and his wife Anna Maria Ellen née Birch. Henry was educated at Eton and Magdalene College, Cambridge, and around 1840 he went to Australia to work as a tutor. While he was there he met and married Esther "Essie" Dillon, daughter of John Dillon, a solicitor of Sydney originally from Dublin, and in 1847 or thereabouts Hatch returned to England with his wife. In 1849, he was ordained at Lichfield and became a curate, and in 1851 he was appointed first chaplain to the New Surrey House of Correction, built on Wandsworth Common.

Hatch's father, Thomas Hatch, was Lord of Sutton Manor. When his father died in 1851, Hatch had to manage his father's estate, and look after his six unmarried sisters and administer their marriage settlements. Hatch and his wife had no children of their own, so in 1856, 11 years after they were married, they adopted an orphan, Lucy Harriet Buckler.

Actions in the Court of Chancery – at least one of them brought by Hatch himself – together with an ill-fated journalistic venture, dissipated Hatch's entire cash reserves. In 1859, when Lucy was now seven and needed educating, Hatch and his wife decided to employ a governess and take on some paying pupils to defray the cost and provide some extra income. They advertised in The Times, and Thomas and Caroline Plummer brought their daughters, Mary Eugenia, aged 11, and her seven-year-old sister Stephana Augusta to Wandsworth to receive tuition. The Plummers were a well-off family from Broad Blunsdon in Wiltshire. The arrangement did not last long, because Caroline Plummer feared that a violent thunderstorm was an act of God against her for "abandoning her children with strangers" and removed both children the following day. Eugenia was only at Wandsworth for two weeks; Stephana for just one night.

== Trial ==
Two months later, Henry received a letter from his bishop saying that the Plummers were accusing him of assaulting both of their daughters while they were in his care. On 1 December 1859 he was tried at the Old Bailey, convicted, and sentenced to four years hard labour. He was sent to Newgate Prison. Prosecution witnesses were Eugenia, Stephana and their mother, Caroline Plummer. There was some disquiet in the press regarding the justice of the conviction given the nature of the accusations, ‘too disgusting to print’, and significant discrepancies in the prosecution testimony given. Neither Hatch nor his wife had been allowed to give evidence, and his counsel, Serjeant William Ballantine, did not call any material witnesses. Henry's only chance of liberty was to apply for the Royal Pardon.

Hatch's petition to The Queen contained his own evidence and that of members of his household, none of which had been heard in court. His supporters contacted the twelve members of the jury and showed them the petition. Eleven of the twelve then signed a declaration to the effect that had they seen Hatch's evidence during the trial, they would never have convicted him. While the Home Secretary, Sir George Cornewall Lewis, remained unconvinced, he did say that if Eugenia could be convicted of perjury, the petition would be reconsidered.

== Perjury Trial ==
Hatch's supporters advertised for funds to bring an action against Eugenia, and raised around £700 from the public. Finally, on 15 May 1860, Mary Eugenia Plummer, now aged twelve, was put on trial at the Old Bailey for Wilful and Corrupt Perjury.

After a five-day trial, Eugenia was found guilty and sentenced to three weeks in prison, followed by two years in a reform school. During the trial Caroline Plummer was seen to be intoxicated in the witness box, the Plummers’ doctor, John Gay, fainted under cross-examination and Eugenia's sister Stephana, now aged eight, claimed that Hatch had assaulted her while his wife looked on.

A week after the trial ended, Hatch was released from Newgate, having spent 191 days in prison. Two weeks after that, Eugenia too was released under The Royal Pardon; she was to spend several years away from her family under the control of a strict governess, where it was intended that she should receive some religious and moral education.

There was extensive coverage in the press, most commentators concluding that Caroline Plummer had coached Eugenia and Stephana in what to say. Nevertheless, a conspiracy between Mrs. Plummer and her children was impossible to prove, so no action was ever brought against the Plummers.

== Final Days ==
Hatch embarked on a protracted series of court actions against his solicitors, Lewis and Lewis, for bungling his defence case.

After 21 years as Rector of Little Stambridge in Essex, he and Essie ended their days in Little Linford in Buckinghamshire. On his death in 1895, Henry John Hatch's liabilities exceeded his assets by £65.
