= Henry James Hatch =

United States Army general

Henry J. Hatch
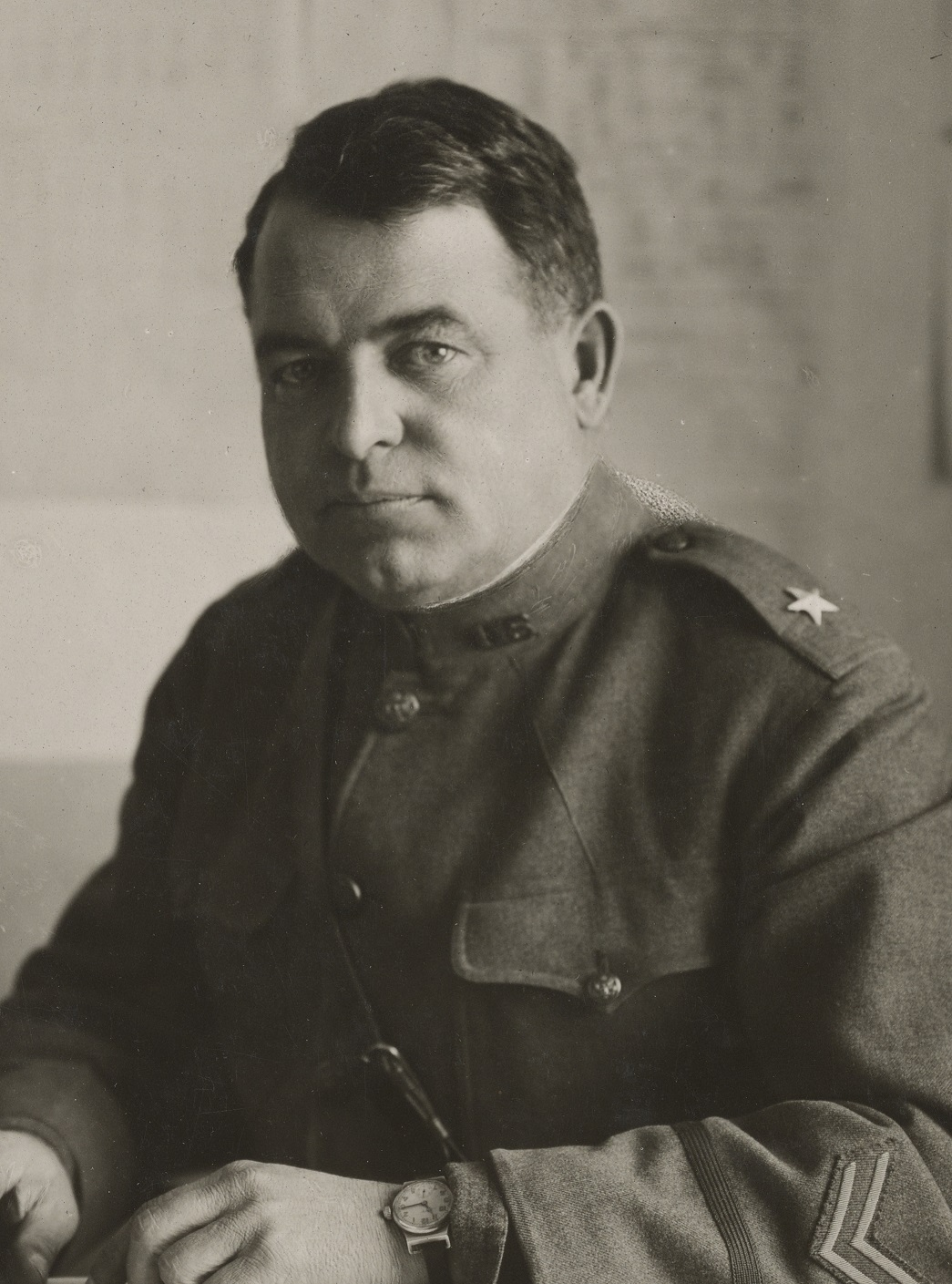
- Brigadier Henry Hatch in September 1918
- Born: April 28, 1869; Charlotteville, Michigan
- Died: December 31, 1931 (aged 62); Washington, D.C.
- Education: University of Michigan
- Spouse: Alice E. Hill
- Children: 2
- Military career
- Allegiance: United States
- Branch: United States Army; Field Artillery Branch
- Service years: 1898–1931
- Rank: Brigadier general
- Service number: 0-659
- Conflicts: World War I
- Awards: Distinguished Service Medal; Legion of Honour

Henry James Hatch (April 28, 1869 – December 31, 1931) was a United States Army officer in the late 19th and early 20th centuries. He served in World War I and received the Distinguished Service Medal among other awards.

== Biography ==
Hatch was born in Charlotteville, Michigan, on April 28, 1869. He graduated from the University of Michigan in 1891 with a B.S. in engineering. His father was president of the Arkansas City National Bank of Arkansas City, Kansas, and Hatch was the bank's cashier from 1891 to 1897.

Hatch was commissioned as a second lieutenant of the Artillery Corps on July 9, 1898, and he graduated from the artillery school. He rose through the ranks, becoming a colonel on February 6, 1918, and he was promoted to the rank of brigadier general on June 26, 1918. He served as the chief of the Heavy Artillery section of the staff of the American Expeditionary Forces' Chief of Artillery, and from 1918 to 1919, he commanded the Railway Artillery of the Second Army.

Hatch reverted to his permanent rank of colonel on July 1, 1920, serving in the Coast Artillery. He was promoted again to brigadier general on September 5, 1917, with the promotion being permanent this time. later in his career, he commanded Los Angeles's coastal defenses, commanded the harbor defenses of Subic Bay and Manila Bay, and commanded the Second Coast Artillery District. He received the Distinguished Service Medal, and France awarded him the Legion of Honour.

Hatch died in Washington, D.C., where he lived, on December 31, 1931.

== Personal life ==
Hatch married Alice E. Hill on June 26, 1893, and they had two children together.
