= Richard Hatch =

Richard Hatch may refer to:

- Richard Hatch (actor) (1945–2017), American actor, writer and producer
- Richard Hatch (Survivor contestant) (born 1961), American reality television contestant

== See also ==
- Richard G. Hatcher (1933–2019), mayor of Gary, Indiana
