= Edwin Hatch =

English theologian (1835–1889)

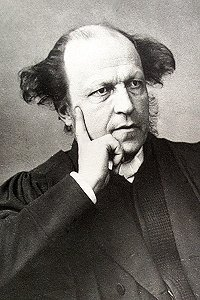
- Born: 4 September 1835; Derby, England
- Died: 10 November 1889 (aged 54); Oxford, England
- Education: King Edward's School, Birmingham; Pembroke College; Oxford University
- Occupations: Professor, author
- Children: 4, including Beatrice, Evelyn and Ethel Hatch

Edwin Warren Hatch (4 September 1835 Derby, England – 10 November 1889 Oxford, England) was an English theologian. He is best known as the author of the book Influence of Greek Ideas and Usages Upon the Christian Church, which was based on his 1888 Hibbert Lectures and which were edited and published following his death. He is also remembered as the composer of the hymn "Breathe on Me, Breath of God."

== Biography ==
He was born in Derby, the son of Samuel Hatch, a grocer and accountant, and his wife Charlotte Mooney; Walter Mooney Hatch was his brother. He attended King Edward's School, Birmingham, where he studied under James Prince Lee; he was noted for his intellectual independence and study habits. He joined the Church of England, baptised in 1852, having been raised a nonconformist, under the influence of John Cale Miller, rector of St Martin in the Bull Ring.

Hatch matriculated at Pembroke College, Oxford in 1853, where he was a dominant figure in the Birmingham Set. He graduated B.A. in 1857, and M.A. in 1867.

In 1858, Hatch won the Ellerton Prize. That year, he was ordained deacon, and worked in London's East End. In 1859, he was ordained as an Anglican priest. He moved to Toronto, Canada West, where he was professor of classics at Trinity College until 1862. Between then and his return to Oxford, England, in 1867, he served as rector of the High School of Quebec and professor of Classics at Morrin College, both in Quebec City. He was vice-principal of St Mary Hall from 1867 until 1885. In 1884 he was appointed university reader in ecclesiastical history.

Hatch was a Bampton lecturer in 1880. He served as a Grinfield lecturer from 1880 to 1884, during which time he presented his concordance on the Septuagint.

== Works ==
- The organization of the early Christian churches (1881) – the Bampton lectures of 1880; translated into German by Adolf von Harnack (Giessen, 1883)
- Baynes, T. S.; Smith, W. R., eds. (1885). "Paul" . Encyclopædia Britannica. Vol. 18 (9th ed.). New York: Charles Scribner's Sons.
- The Growth of Church Institutions (1887)
- Essays in Biblical Greek (1889)
- A Concordance to the Septuagint and the Other Greek Versions of the Old Testament (including the Apocryphal books) by Edwin Hatch and Henry A. Redpath, assisted by many scholars (Oxford: Clarendon Press, 1897)
- Towards Fields of Light: Sacred Poems (1890)
- The God of Hope (1890)
- Memorials of Edwin Hatch (1890) including papers and sermons, edited by his brother Samuel C. Hatch
- The influence of Greek ideas and usages upon the Christian church (the “Hibbert Lectures,” edited by Andrew Martin Fairbairn, 1897)

In 1873, Hatch edited The student's handbook to the University and colleges of Oxford, which appeared in several revised editions during and after his time at the university. He wrote a small number of hymns, collected in the posthumous Towards Fields of Light . One that is noted is Breathe on me, Breath of God. It appeared in the Congregational Psalmist Hymnal (1886) edited by Henry Allon. I dared not hope that thou wouldst deign was included in Garrett Horder's Hymns: Supplemental to Existing Collections (1894).

== Family ==
Hatch and his wife Evelyn had four children: Arthur Herbert Hatch (b. 1864), Beatrice Hatch (b. 1866), Ethel Hatch (b. 1869), and Evelyn Hatch (b. 1871).
