= Charles N. Clark =

American politician (1827–1902)

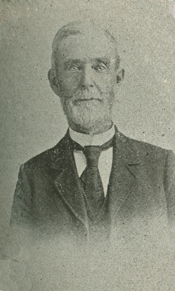
- Clark in 1896

Member of the U.S. House of Representatives from Missouri's 1st district
- In office March 4, 1895 – March 3, 1897
- Preceded by: William H. Hatch
- Succeeded by: James T. Lloyd

Personal details
- Born: Charles Nelson Clark; August 21, 1827 Cortland County, New York, US
- Died: October 4, 1902 (aged 75) Hannibal, Missouri, US
- Party: Republican
- Education: Hamilton College
- Profession: Politician

Military service
- Allegiance: United States
- Branch/service: Union Army
- Years of service: 1861–1863
- Rank: First lieutenant
- Unit: 3rd Illinois Cavalry Regiment
- Battles/wars: American Civil War

Charles Nelson Clark (August 21, 1827 – October 4, 1902) was an American politician. A Republican, he was a member of the United States House of Representatives from Missouri.

== Biography ==
Clark was born on August 21, 1827, in Cortland County, New York. He studied at Hamilton College, and moved to Illinois in 1859. During the American Civil War, he raised Company G of 3rd Illinois Cavalry Regiment, of the Union army, on August 6, 1861. He fought in the front lines, under Eugene Asa Carr, and was left disabled while fighting. He achieved the rank of first lieutenant, serving until March 16, 1863. In April 1865, he moved to Hannibal, Missouri. Between 1872 and 1874, he built levees for Sny Island, which in total reclaimed over 100,000 acres of land from the American Bottom floodplain.

Clark was a Republican. He was elected to the United States House of Representatives with a plurality of 429 over Democratic candidate William H. Hatch. He served from March 4, 1895, to March 3, 1897, representing Missouri's 1st district; he was the first Republican elected to his district in over 25 years. During his tenure, he was a member of the Committee on Rivers and Harbors, and an obituary described him as having a "fair record" in Congress. He lost his re-election, as well as the following election.

After serving in Congress, Clark became a farmer. He was married. He died on October 4, 1902, aged 75, in Hannibal, from illness. His body was transported to Ohio, and he was buried at Wauseon Union Cemetery.

U.S. House of Representatives
Preceded by William H. Hatch	Member of the U.S. House of Representatives from Missouri's 1st congressional district 1895–1897	Succeeded by James T. Lloyd
