= Hatch, Missouri =

Unincorporated community in Missouri, United States

Coordinates: 39°35′20″N 91°37′05″W

Hatch is an unincorporated community in Ralls County, in the U.S. state of Missouri.

== History ==
A post office called Hatch was established in 1883, and remained in operation until 1905. The community is named after William H. Hatch (1833–1896), a U.S. Representative from Missouri.
