= William H. Hatch =

American politician (1833–1896)

William Henry Hatch
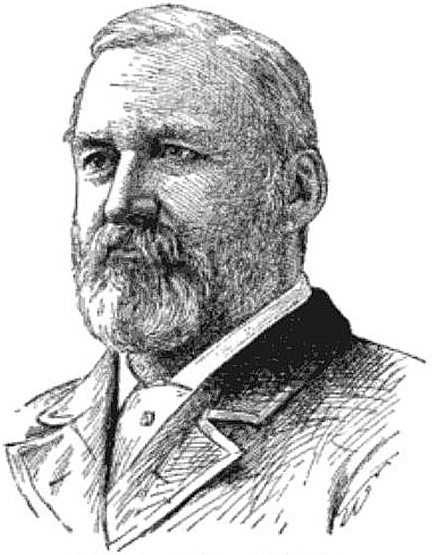

Member of the U.S. House of Representatives from Missouri
- In office March 4, 1879 – March 3, 1895
- Preceded by: John M. Glover
- Succeeded by: Charles N. Clark
- Constituency: 12th district (1879–1883); 1st district (1883–1895)

Personal details
- Born: September 11, 1833 Georgetown, Kentucky, U.S.
- Died: December 23, 1896 (aged 63) Hannibal, Missouri, U.S.
- Party: Democratic
- Spouse(s): Jennie L. Smith; Thetis Clay Hawkins
- Children: 2

William Henry Hatch (September 11, 1833 – December 23, 1896) was a U.S. representative from Missouri. He was the namesake of the Hatch Act of 1887, which established state agricultural experiment stations for the land-grant colleges. Hatch is also the namesake of Hatch Hall, a Residence Hall at the University of Missouri.

== Early life ==
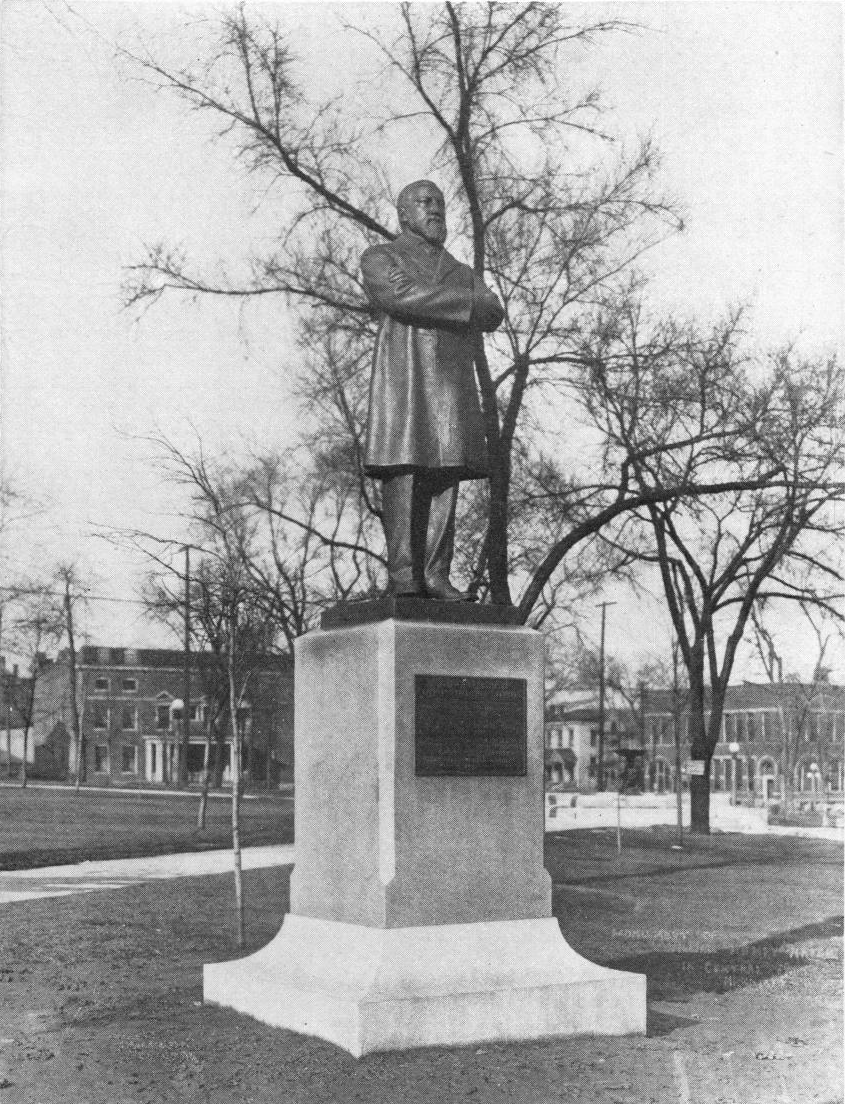

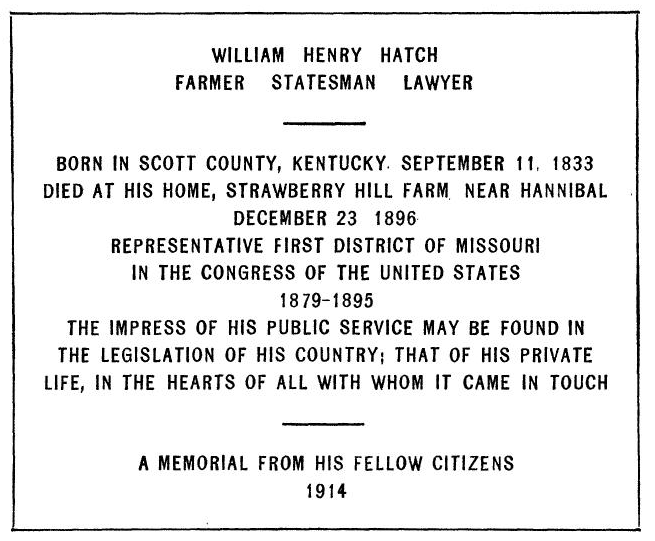

William Henry Hatch was born on September 11, 1833 near Georgetown, Kentucky. Hatch attended the schools of Lexington, Kentucky, and studied law at a law office in Richmond. He was admitted to the bar in Kentucky in 1854.

== Career ==
Hatch practiced law for one year in Harrodsburg, Kentucky. Hatch moved to Hannibal, Missouri, in 1856 and opened a law office with a partner named Campbell. He was elected as Circuit Attorney of the Sixteenth Judicial Circuit of Missouri in 1858 and 1860.

By 1862, Hatch enlisted with the Confederate States Army in the Civil War. He was made a commissioned captain and assistant adjutant general under General G. W. Smith in December 1862, and in March 1863 was assigned to duty as assistant commissioner of exchange of prisoners under the cartel, and continued in this position until the close of the war. He was promoted to Lieutenant Colonel in 1864.

In 1872, Hatch ran for governor of Missouri, but lost. Hatch was elected as a Democrat to the Forty-sixth and to the seven succeeding Congresses (March 4, 1879 – March 4, 1895), during which time he served as chairman of the Committee on Agriculture (Forty-eighth through Fiftieth and Fifty-second and Fifty-third Congresses). He was an unsuccessful candidate for reelection in 1894 to the Fifty-fourth Congress. After his congressional career, he engaged in agricultural pursuits.

== Personal life ==
Hatch married Jennie L. Smith of Scott County, Kentucky. She died in 1858. Hatch married Thetis Clay Hawkins of Missouri at the age of 28. He had two children, Sallie and Lewellen.

Hatch raised cattle, horses and hogs at Strawberry Hill, west of Hannibal.

== Death ==
Hatch died of Bright's disease near Hannibal, Missouri, on December 23, 1896, and was interred in Mount Olivet Cemetery.

== Legacy ==
Hatch is the namesake of the community of Hatch, Missouri. While William Hatch is by no means a household name, his name has become synonymous with the agricultural experiment stations that were founded by his legislation. He is best remembered through the many laboratories and lecture halls named in his memory at land-grant institutions across the US.

In his hometown of Hannibal, Missouri, a bronze statue was erected in his name in 1914, nearly 20 years after his death, which stands in the center of that town today. In 1987 a plaque was added to this monument commemorating the centennial of the Hatch Act of 1887.

== See also ==
- Justin Smith Morrill, introduced the Morrill Land-Grant Acts, establishing American land-grant colleges

U.S. House of Representatives
Preceded by John M. Glover	Member of the U.S. House of Representatives from Missouri's 12th congressional district 1879–1883	Succeeded by Charles H. Morgan
Preceded by Martin L. Clardy	Member of the U.S. House of Representatives from Missouri's 1st congressional district 1883–1895	Succeeded by Charles N. Clark
