= Stephani Hatch =

American sociologist

- Born: Stephani Louise Hatch
- Education: Georgia State University (MA); University of Maryland, College Park (PhD)
- Occupation: Sociologist
- Known for: Mental health research Health inequality
- Scientific career
- Workplaces: King's College London; Columbia University
- Thesis: Pathways to drug use among inner city women (2002)

Stephani Louise Hatch is an American sociologist who is a psychiatric epidemiologist at the Institute of Psychiatry, Psychology and Neuroscience. Her research consider urban mental health and inequality in mental health provision.

== Early life and education ==
Hatch studied psychology at Indiana University Bloomington. She was a graduate student at Georgia State University, where she studied women's pharmaceutical treatment challenges. She completed her doctoral research at the University of Maryland, College Park, where she continued her work on drug use in inner city women. Her early research was supported by a National Institute of Mental Health (NIMH) fellowship. After graduating, Hatch joined Columbia University as a postdoctoral fellow.

== Research and career ==
In 2006, Hatch joined the faculty at King's College London, where she was made Professor in 2019. At King's College, Hatch has studied urban mental health, health inequalities and disparities in how people access mental health support. As part of these efforts, Hatch leads the HERON network. She leads the Wellcome Trust programme Tackling Inequalities and Discrimination Experiences in health Services (TIDES), which looks at the prevalence and impact of discrimination by healthcare providers, and how their behaviour perpetuates health inequalities. TIDES evaluates how various protected characteristics (socioeconomic status, gender, ethnicity, migration status) create barriers between patients and their healthcare systems. In a study of almost 34,000 adults, Hatch showed that only one hour of exercise a week was enough to prevent depression.

Hatch created the HYPE (improving the Health of Young PeoplE) Project. HYPE, which is supported by the Maudsley Hospital. HYPE looks to improve young people's access to community-based and online mental and physical health related information. Throughout the COVID-19 pandemic, HYPE expanded to evaluate how social distancing, isolation and ongoing lockdowns impacted the lives of young adults. Hatch also looked at the impact of the COVID-19 pandemic on adult mental health, showing that the lockdown and associated uncertainty resulted in the deterioration of mental health.

Hatch investigated racial discrimination within the National Health Service. During the COVID-19 pandemic, Hatch worked with the NHS Check Study to understand the mental health and employment experiences of Black and minority ethnic NHS staff. She was supported by UK Research and Innovation (UKRI) to launch a research programme into the experiences of healthcare workers of colour before and during the pandemic.

== Selected publications ==
- Hatch, Stephani L.; Dohrenwend, Bruce P. (December 1, 2007). "Distribution of Traumatic and Other Stressful Life Events by Race/Ethnicity, Gender, SES and Age: A Review of the Research". American Journal of Community Psychology. 40 (3): 313–332. doi:10.1007/s10464-007-9134-z. ISSN 1573-2770. PMID 17906927. S2CID 8009889.
- Harvey, Samuel B.; Øverland, Simon; Hatch, Stephani L.; Wessely, Simon; Mykletun, Arnstein; Hotopf, Matthew (2018). "Exercise and the Prevention of Depression: Results of the HUNT Cohort Study". American Journal of Psychiatry. 175 (1): 28–36. doi:10.1176/appi.ajp.2017.16111223. ISSN 0002-953X. PMID 28969440.
- Harvey, Samuel B.; Øverland, Simon; Hatch, Stephani L.; Wessely, Simon; Mykletun, Arnstein; Hotopf, Matthew (October 3, 2017). "Exercise and the Prevention of Depression: Results of the HUNT Cohort Study". American Journal of Psychiatry. 175 (1): 28–36. doi:10.1176/appi.ajp.2017.16111223. ISSN 0002-953X. PMID 28969440.
