= Rob Hatch =

British sport commentator

Rob Hatch is a British television sports commentator and broadcaster. Born in Accrington, Hatch grew up in a sporty family. He studied sports science at university, and became a fan of professional cycling while working and travelling in Europe after university. He subsequently did a broadcasting master's degree in Madrid with work experience in 2007 at Eurosport News.

After working across several broadcast jobs, Hatch's first major cycling commentary was on the 2009 Giro d'Italia with Eurosport. He subsequently became a regular commentator in cycling for Eurosport and their successor in the UK, TNT Sports, being the lead commentator for many major events, including the Tour de France. He is a regular contributor to The Cycling Podcast. A resident of Majorca, Hatch is fluent in several European languages and he is noted for his careful pronunciation of names in national or regional accents.

Hatch won commentator of the year at the 2024 Broadcast Sport Awards, but his appointment by TNT to commentate on the 2025/26 Ashes was met with scepticism due to his lack of experience in commentating on cricket.
