= Hatch (e-commerce company) =

Hatch is an Amsterdam-based ecommerce platform that was founded in July 2011 under the name Iceleads by serial entrepreneur Joris Kroese and founding partner Icecat as being part of the iMerge group that provided EUR 500,000 seed capital.

The company developed a Where to Buy platform that allows brands to connect with online retailers. Hatch is globally servicing A-brands such as Intel, Lenovo, Bose, Philips, Dorel and offers them a live interface with 2800 retailers.

== Series-A funding ==
In March 2015 the company raised 3,5 million dollar venture capital in a Series A funding round. The growth capital was provided by Vortex Capital Partners. Two months later the company established a new board of directors by attracting Tony Hewett and Sebastian Aubert (Formerly Universal McCann) and Dimitra Retsina. It then also opened an office in Portland, Oregon.

November 2015 Iceleads changed their company name to Hatch by launching a new website and sending out a press release.

== Awards and recognition ==
During the 2015 B2B Marketing Awards in London the company became a finalist] in the category "Best use of digital techniques and/or technologies", with their business case New from Bose. The case later also won a few other awards such as the FWA and Lovie Awards. Aside from being a speaker on several (start-up) events, the company was also listed in the top charts of the Dutch Start-up Deals.

Hatch currently employs 40-50 FTE in their offices in Amsterdam, Bangkok, Düsseldorf, London, Kiev and Portland.
