= Suzuki Hatch =

The Suzuki Hatch name has been used on two different cars built by Suzuki:

- 1973–1979 — A small, rear-wheel drive van which was considered part of the Fronte family. Some model years it was marketed as the "Fronte Hatch", but in 1975 and 1976 it was sold simply as the "Suzuki Hatch".
- 1980–1984 — The first generation van version of the Suzuki Alto subcompact car, equipped with a four-stroke 543 or 796 cc engine, was sold in Australia as the "Suzuki Hatch".
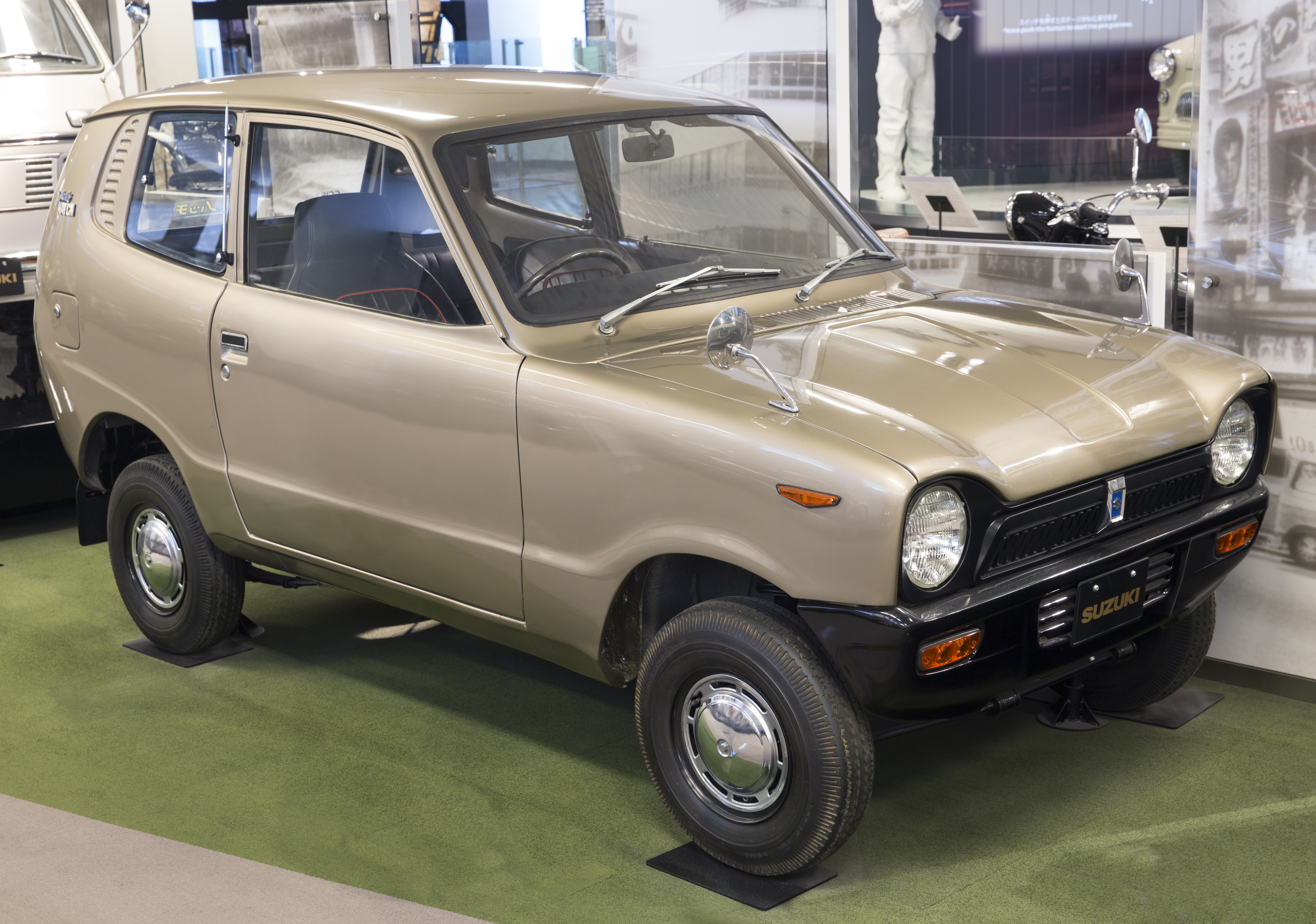
Suzuki Hatch (LS30/SH10; 1973–1979)

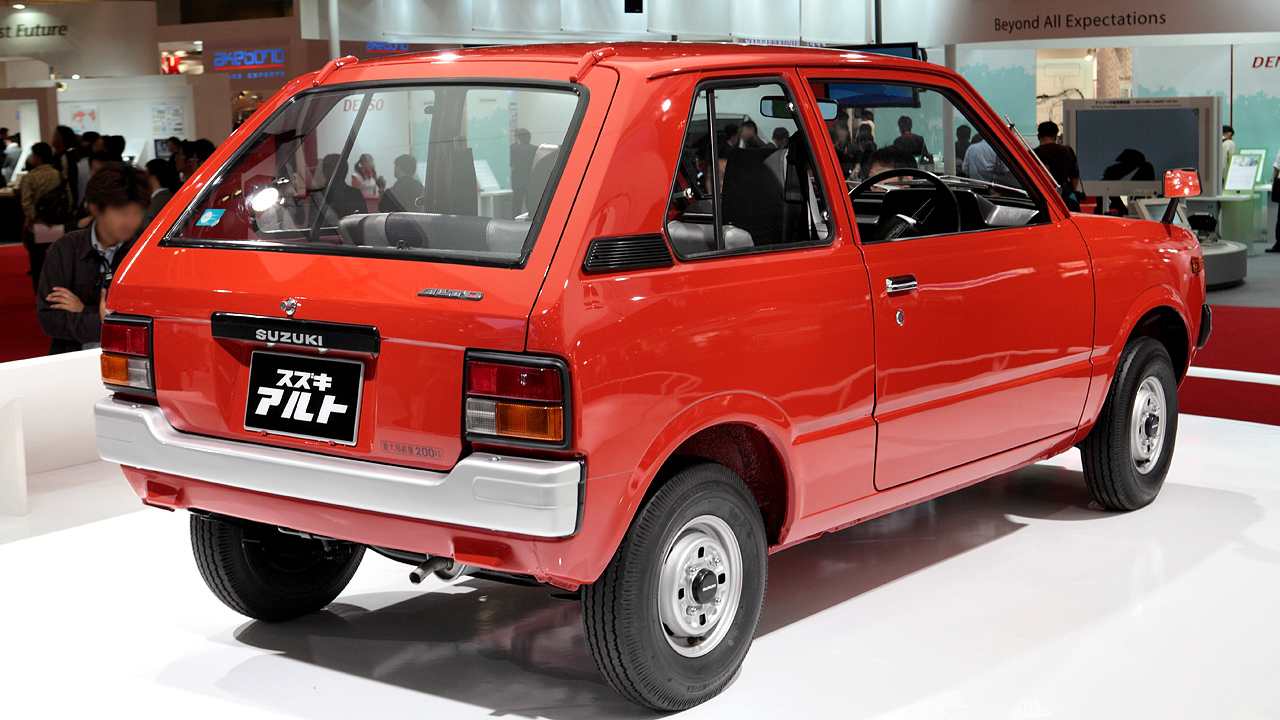
Suzuki Hatch (SS40V; 1980–1984)
