= Hatch, Idaho =

Unincorporated community in the state of Idaho, United States

Coordinates: 42°49′10″N 111°51′08″W

Hatch is an unincorporated community in Caribou County, in the U.S. state of Idaho.

== History ==
The first settlement at Hatch was made in 1882, at which time the town site was within Bannock County (Caribou County was not formed until 1919). A post office called Hatch was established in 1896, and remained in operation until 1934. The community was named after Ransom Hatch, an early settler.

Hatch's population was estimated at 100 in 1909.
