= Bob Hatch =

American football player and coach (1879–1944)

Biographical details
- Born: November 22, 1879; Chittenango, New York, U.S.
- Died: July 25, 1944 (aged 64); New York, New York, U.S.

Playing career
- 1901–1902: Williams
- Position: Tackle

Coaching career (HC unless noted)
- 1903: Colgate
- 1906: Williams

Head coaching record
- Overall: 9–4–2

James Arthur "Bob" Hatch (November 22, 1879 – July 25, 1944) was an American college football coach. He served as the head football coach at Colgate University for one season, in 1903, compiling a record of 4–2–1. Hatch also served as the head football coach at his alma mater, Williams College, for one season in 1906.

== Head coaching record ==
Year	Team	Overall	Conference	Standing	Bowl/playoffs
Colgate (Independent) (1902)
1903	Colgate	4–2–1			
Colgate:		4–2–1			
Williams Ephs (Independent) (1906)
1906	Williams	5–2–2			
Williams:		5–2–2			
Total:		9–4–3			
