= Thomas Lathbury =

English cleric known as an ecclesiastical historian

Thomas Lathbury (1798 – 1865) was an English Church of England clergyman known as an ecclesiastical historian.

== Life ==
The son of Henry Lathbury, was born at Brackley, Northamptonshire, and educated at St. Edmund Hall, Oxford. He graduated Bachelor of Arts in 1824, and Master of Arts in 1827.

Having taken holy orders, Lathbury was appointed curate of Chatteris, Cambridgeshire. Afterwards he was curate at Bath, Somerset and at Wootton, Northamptonshire. In 1831 he obtained the curacy of Mangotsfield, Gloucestershire. His fifth curacy was the Bath Abbey, to which he was appointed in 1838. In 1848 he was presented by Bishop James Henry Monk to the parish of St. Simon's, Baptist Mills, Bristol.

Lathbury was one of the promoters of the Church Congress held at Bristol in September 1864. He died at his residence, Cave Street, St. Paul's, Bristol, on 11 February 1865.

== Works ==
His major works were:

- The Protestant Memorial. Strictures on a Letter addressed by Mr. Pugin to the Supporters of the Martyrs' Memorial at Oxford, London [1830?].
- A History of the English Episcopacy, from the Period of the Long Parliament to the Act of Uniformity, with Notices of the Religious Parties of the time, and a Review of Ecclesiastical Affairs in England from the Reformation, London, 1836.
- A Review of a Sermon by the Rev. W. Jay on the English Reformation (anon.), London, 1837.
- The State of Popery and Jesuitism in England, from the Reformation to the … Roman Catholic Relief Bill in 1829, and the Charge of Novelty, Heresy, and Schism against the Church of Rome substantiated, London, 1838.
- Protestantism the old Religion, Popery the new, London [1838?]; sixth thousand, enlarged, London [1850?].
- The State of the Church of England from the Introduction of Christianity to the period of the Reformation, London, 1839.
- Guy Fawkes, or a complete History of the Gunpowder Treason … and some Notices of the Revolution of 1688, London, 1839; 2nd edit., enlarged, London, 1840.
- The Spanish Armada, A.D. 1588, or the Attempt of Philip II and Pope Sixtus V to re-establish Popery in England, London, 1840.
- A History of the Convocation of the Church of England, being an Account of the Proceedings of Anglican Ecclesiastical Councils from the earliest Period, London, 1842, 8vo; 2nd edit., with additions, London, 1853.
- The Authority of the Services, (1) for the Fifth of November, (2) on Thirtieth of January, (3) the Twenty-ninth of May, (4) for the Accession of the Sovereign, considered, London, 1843, reprinted from the Church of England Quarterly Review.
- Memorials of Ernest the Pious, first Duke of Saxe-Gotha, and the lineal Ancestor of His Royal Highness Prince Albert, London, 1843.
- A History of the Nonjurors, their Controversies and Writings, with Remarks on some of the Rubrics in the Book of Common Prayer, London, 1845.
- List of Printed Services belonging to T. Lathbury [London, 1845?].
- An edition of Jeremy Collier's Ecclesiastical History of Great Britain, with a life of the author, the controversial tracts connected with the History, and an index, 9 vols. London, 1852.
- A History of the Book of Common Prayer and other Books of Authority; with … an Account of the State of Religion and of Religious Parties in England from 1640 to 1660, London, 1858, and 1859.
- The Proposed Revision of the Book of Common Prayer, London, 1860.
- Facts and Fictions of the Bicentenary: a Sketch from 1640 to 1662, London [1862]. Printed for the Bristol Church Defence Association.
- Oliver Cromwell, or the Old and New Dissenters, with Strictures on the Lectures of N. Haycroft and H. Quick, London [1862]. Printed for the Bristol Church Defence Association.

== Family ==
Lathbury left a widow and four children, three of them sons. The eldest son, Daniel Conner Lathbury, qualified as a barrister but became a journalist and newspaper editor; the second took orders in the Church of England.
