= Hatch Lake =

Lake in the state of Minnesota, United States

- Location within Minnesota Location within the United States
- Location: Rice County, Minnesota
- Coordinates: 44°30′30″N 93°28′50″W
- Type: lake
- Basin countries: United States
- Surface elevation: 1,037 ft (316 m)

Hatch Lake is a lake in Rice County, in the U.S. state of Minnesota.

Hatch Lake was named for Zenas Y. Hatch, an early settler.
