= University Hall (Dublin) =

Former residential hall accommodation in Dublin, Ireland

- Location within Central Dublin
- Alternative names: Hatch Hall

General information
- Type: Residential accommodation and hotel
- Architectural style: Gothic Revival architecture
- Classification: Protected structure
- Location: Hatch Street Lower, Dublin 2, Dublin, Ireland
- Coordinates: 53°20′02″N 6°15′23″W
- Groundbreaking: 1910
- Estimated completion: 1913
- Owner: Red Carnation Hotels

Technical details
- Material: Red brick and limestone detailing
- Floor count: 4

Design and construction
- Architect: Charles B. Powell
- Developer: Society of Jesus
- Main contractor: William Connolly & Sons

University Hall, also known as Hatch Hall, is a building on Hatch Street, Dublin 2, Ireland which has housed a Jesuit university hall accommodation, a direct provision accommodation centre for asylum seekers and refugees and in 2020 a plan was lodged for its conversion to a 60-bedroom 5-star hotel.

The building was designed by Charles B. Powell in 1910 in a late-Victorian and gothic-revival style which contrasted markedly with its predominantly Georgian townhouse surroundings.

== History ==
Founded by the Jesuits in 1913, University Hall provided accommodation for third level male students studying in Dublin until its closure in 2004. The Jesuits promoted a spirit of 'Friendship, Faith, Involvement', and the hall was well known for its community spirit. The hall's motto was Sic Luceat Lux Vestra (in this way let your light shine).

Initially the hall catered to only a small number of students, mostly studying medicine in UCD, but its intake grew progressively larger throughout the twentieth century to a yearly average of over 100 male students.

In 2004 the property was bought for €16m by Gerry Barrett, a property developer who intended to develop the hall into a hotel. Permission for an 81-bedroom hotel was initially granted permission by Dublin City Council before being rejected by An Bord Pleanála.

Later the building was operated as a direct provision centre being used as accommodation for asylum seekers and refugees.

The building was acquired by Red Carnation Hotels for €20m in 2019 and is to be converted into a 5-star boutique hotel.

== Culture ==
The undisputed annual highlight of the Hall's calendar was the 'Hatch Ball' a large formal dinner held in the nearby Shelbourne Hotel. It was by no means, however, the only social gathering; with intermittent discos in nearby nightclubs, nightly parties in private rooms usually proceeding to Dublin nightclubs and regular excursions to the beloved local pub, Hartigans of Leeson Street, the social scene was always vibrant.

The hall also supported a number of societies including film, debating and photography. The management actively encouraged hall residents to become active members of the local community through charity events and homework clubs.

Former residents of Hatch hall still meet socially in Hartigans pub on the first Wednesday of every calendar month; a social gathering known as "Hatch Wednesday". Past residents of the hall have included Desmond O'Malley, founder and former leader of the Progressive Democrats; Brian Cowen T.D and Michael O'Leary, Ryanair CEO.
