= Vice-principal =

Assistant to the principal of a school

In larger school systems, a head teacher principal is often assisted by someone known as a vice-principal, deputy principal, or assistant/associate principal. Unlike the principal, the vice-principal does not have quite the decision-making authority that the principal carries. Although they still carry nearly the same authority among students, vice-principals do not have the same power on the board. Experience as an assistant principal is often a prerequisite for advancement to a principalship.

== Job description ==
Assistant principals aid the principal in the overall administration of the school. However, deputy principals are higher than assistant principals as it will be the DP (Deputy Principal)'s responsibility step up in case of the principal's absence, illness, temporary leave or resignation to step forward as Principal. Some assistant principals hold this position for several years to prepare for advancement to principal jobs; others are career assistant principals. They are primarily responsible for scheduling student classes, ordering textbooks and supplies, and coordinating transportation, custodial, cafeteria, and other support services. They usually handle student discipline and attendance problems, social and recreational programs, and health and safety matters. They also may counsel students on personal, educational, or vocational matters. With the advent of site-based management, assistant principals are playing a greater role in ensuring the academic success of students by helping to develop new curricula, evaluating teachers, and dealing with school-community relations—responsibilities previously assumed solely by the principal. The number of assistant principals that a school employs may vary, depending on the number of students.

== Education ==
Most schools require elementary, middle, and high school principals to have a master's degree in education administration or leadership. Most principals also have experience as teachers. Master's degrees in educational administration are offered at a number of universities around the United States including the University of North Texas, Ball State University, Drexel University, Ashland University, Northeastern University, and the University of Scranton.

== Duties ==
In American schools, it is often his or her duty to handle matters such as student discipline, parent conference meetings, asset inventory and ordering, school improvement planning, bus and lunch supervision, and teacher observations. Additionally, assistant principals frequently serve as testing coordinators, training staff on procedures related to standardized assessment, as well as accounting for testing materials. In addition to these duties, assistant principals are instructional leaders.

Most importantly however, if something happens to the principal, such as an extended leave of absence, then the assistant principal would act as the interim principal. Because of this, many see this position as a stepping-stone to the larger role of principal and is often used as such. In most schools, the vice principal forgoes all teaching duties in order to address broader educational issues. However, in Canada, during an extended leave of absence of the principal, usually a retired principal will be assigned to a school by the school board/district to oversee the management of the school until the actual principal returns; thus, the roles and responsibilities of the Vice-Principal(s) will remain the same.

In the United Kingdom, most secondary schools include Assistant Principals (traditionally referred to as Assistant Headteachers), who are typically managed by Vice-Principals (traditionally known as Deputy Headteachers). While responsibilities may vary between schools, Assistant Principals and Vice-Principals generally play key roles in supporting school-wide initiatives related to maintaining academic standards, managing student behaviour, overseeing Key Stages 3–5, coordinating teaching and examination timetables, promoting inclusion, developing the curriculum, enhancing student learning, and ensuring institutional accountability. They are also often responsible for conducting performance appraisals and observing classroom instruction. Increasingly, principals (also referred to as headteachers, headmasters, or headmistresses) are being granted greater autonomy in structuring their school’s senior leadership teams and defining the specific responsibilities of each member. As a result, leadership teams in English secondary schools can be quite large—ranging from 8 to 12 members—depending on the school’s size and demographics. A typical configuration may include 1–2 headteachers, 2–4 deputy headteachers, and 3–8 assistant headteachers. Unlike in the United States and Canada, most Deputy and Assistant Headteachers in the UK continue to teach one or two courses alongside their administrative duties.

== See also ==
- Dean (education)
