= Thomas V. Hatch =

American politician (born 1950)

Thomas V. Hatch (born June 11, 1950) is a former Republican politician from Southern Utah. He served as a member of the Garfield County, Utah Board of Commissioners from 1984 to 1994, a member of the Utah soil conservation commission from 1983 to 1991, a state representative from 1995 to 2003, and a state senator from 2003 to 2007.

Hatch served as chairman of the Utah House Rules Committee as well as a member of the Executive Appropriations Committee. In 2001 Hatch was elected Majority Leader in the House of Representatives. Among other positions Hatch served on the natural resources appropriation committee.

== Sources ==
- report mentioning Hatch
