= Bonamy Price =

British political economist

- Born: 22 May 1807; Saint Peter Port, Guernsey, Channel Islands
- Died: 8 January 1888 (aged 80); London, England

Bonamy Price (22 May 1807 – 8 January 1888) was a British political economist.

== Biography ==
He was born at Saint Peter Port, Guernsey, the son of Frederick Price and his wife Maria Martha Vardon. He lived on the island until age 14.

Price left Guernsey and came under the tutelage of the Rev. Charles Bradley in High Wycombe, where he was taught alongside William Smith O'Brien. He matriculated at Worcester College, Oxford, in 1825, where he received double first in classics, graduating B.A. in 1829, M.A. in 1832. During his time at Worcester College, he occasionally studied under Thomas Arnold, at Laleham; who went on to become head master of Rugby School, and offered Price a role as assistant master of mathematics at the school. Price remained a teacher at Rugby from 1830 until 1850. Price married Lydia Rose, daughter of Joseph Rose who was the vicar at Rothley, on 18 December 1834.

In 1868 Price was elected Drummond Professor of Political Economy at Oxford, and was thrice re-elected to the post, which he held till his death. U.S. Senator from Missouri Carl Schurz quoted extensively from one of Price's treatises during his Senate speech of 14 January 1874. He was in charge of Economics Department at the 1878 National Association for the Promotion of Social Science congress at Cheltenham, as well as the 1882 congress at Nottingham. In 1883 he was elected an honorary fellow of his college. In addition to his professorial work, he was in much request as a popular lecturer on political economy. Price was also a member of Royal Commission on Agricultural Depression & Commission on the Depression of Trade and Commerce.

Price became ill in February 1886 and his health declined; he moved from Oxford to London for treatment until his death. His daughter Bertha married Daniel Conner Lathbury.

== Works ==
- Principles of Political Economy (1878)
- Concerning Currency and Banking (1876)
- Practical Political Economy (1878)
