= List of Leicestershire Cricket Board List A players =

A cricket team representing the Leicestershire Cricket Board played seven List A cricket matches between 1999 and 2002. This is a list of the players who appeared in those matches.

- Stephen Adshead, 1 match, 2001
- David Brignull, 2 matches, 1999–2001
- James Bull, 1 match, 2001
- Craig Crowe, 4 matches, 2000–2002
- Nicholas Ferraby, 2 matches, 2002
- Paul Fisher, 3 matches, 1999–2001
- Dan Furnival, 1 match, 2001
- Karl Geary, 2 matches, 2001
- Christopher Griffiths, 3 matches, 1999–2001
- Jamie Hart, 2 matches, 2001
- Jamil Hassan, 1 match, 2001
- Richard Hutchings, 4 matches, 1999–2001
- Craig Macconacie, 2 matches, 2002
- Neal Mackey, 1 match, 2002
- Olsen Murrain, 2 matches, 2001
- Jigar Naik, 2 matches, 2002
- Tom New, 2 matches, 2001–2002
- Gareth Parkin, 1 match, 2002
- Nemesh Patel, 7 matches, 1999–2002
- Simon Pearson, 1 match, 2001
- Lee Pollard, 3 matches, 1999–2001
- Anthony Pollock, 1 match, 1999
- Neil Pullen, 7 matches, 1999–2002
- Luke Reeves, 3 matches, 2000–2001
- Adam Rennocks, 3 matches, 2001–2002
- James Smith, 2 matches, 1999–2000
- Karl Smith, 1 match, 2001
- Michael Sutliff, 4 matches, 1999–2002
- Matthew Trevor, 2 matches, 2002
- Paul Widdowson, 1 match, 2000
- Oliver Williams, 2 matches, 2002
- Ashley Wright, 3 matches, 1999–2000
- Luke Wright, 1 match, 2001
