= Karl Schmid =

Karl Schmid may refer to:

- Karl Schmid (artist) (1914–1998), Swiss artist
- Karl Schmid (athlete) (born 1921), Swiss Olympic hurdler
- Karl Schmid (rower) (1910–1998), Swiss Olympic rower
- Karl Schmid (television presenter) (born 1980), Australian-American television host, presenter, reporter, and HIV activist
- Karl Norbert Schmid (1926–1995), German organist, composer, choir director and music educator

== See also ==
- Karl Schmidt (disambiguation)
