= Derek Lane =

English cricketer (born 1974)

Personal information
- Full name: Derek Mark Lane
- Born: 7 October 1974 (age 52); Wakefield, Yorkshire
- Batting: Right-handed
- Bowling: Right-arm fast-medium

Domestic team information
- Years: Team
- 1998–1999: Hertfordshire
- 2003–2004: Bedfordshire

Career statistics
| Competition | List A |
|---|---|
| Matches | 3 |
| Runs scored | 12 |
| Batting average | 6.00 |
| 100s/50s | 0/0 |
| Top score | 10 |
| Balls bowled | 120 |
| Wickets | 2 |
| Bowling average | 45.00 |
| 5 wickets in innings | 0 |
| 10 wickets in match | 0 |
| Best bowling | 1/37 |
| Catches/stumpings | 0/– |
- Source: Cricinfo, 28 May 2011

Derek Mark Lane (born 7 October 1974) is a former English cricketer. Lane was a right-handed batsman who bowled right-arm fast-medium. He was born in Wakefield, Yorkshire.

Lane made his debut for Hertfordshire in the 1998 Minor Counties Championship against Buckinghamshire. Lane played 2 further matches for Hertfordshire in 1998, against Norfolk and Staffordshire. The following season, he made 2 List A appearances for Hertfordshire. The first came in the 1st round against the Leicestershire Cricket Board in the 1999 NatWest Trophy. He was dismissed for 2 runs in this match by Neil Pullen, while with the ball he took the wicket of Nemesh Patel for the cost of 38 runs. His second appearance came in the 2nd round against the Sussex Cricket Board. In this match, he wasn't required to bat and bowled 3 wicket-less overs.

Lane later joined Bedfordshire, making his debut for the county in the 2003 Minor Counties Championship against Hertfordshire. He played 2 further matches for Bedfordshire: one in the 2003 Minor Counties Championship against Norfolk and another in the 2004 Minor Counties Championship against Staffordshire. He also made his only MCCA Knockout Trophy appearance in 2003 against Suffolk. In 2003, he played his only List A match for Bedfordshire against Warwickshire in the 3rd round of the 2003 Cheltenham & Gloucester Trophy. In this match, he scored 10 runs before being dismissed by Mark Wagh, while with the ball he took the wicket of Jim Troughton for the cost of 37 runs from 10 overs.

He has also played County Championship Second XI cricket for the Durham, Worcestershire, Hampshire and Surrey Second XI's.
