= Matthew Trevor =

English cricketer (born 1982)

Personal information
- Full name: Matthew Robin Trevor
- Born: 1 September 1982 (age 44); Leicester, Leicestershire, England
- Batting: Right-handed
- Bowling: Right-arm fast-medium

Domestic team information
- Years: Team
- 2002: Leicestershire Cricket Board

Career statistics
Competition	LA
Matches	2
Runs scored	2
Batting average	2.00
100s/50s	–/–
Top score	2
Balls bowled	64
Wickets	–
Bowling average	–
5 wickets in innings	–
10 wickets in match	–
Best bowling	–
Catches/stumpings	–/–
- Source: Cricinfo, 15 November 2010

Matthew Robin Trevor (born 1 September 1982) is an English cricketer. Trevor is a right-handed batsman who bowls right-arm fast-medium. He was born in Leicester, Leicestershire.

Mackey represented the Leicestershire Cricket Board in 2 List A matches against Denmark in the 1st round of the 2003 Cheltenham & Gloucester Trophy, and the Kent Cricket Board in the 2nd round of the same competition. Both matches were held in 2002. In his 2 List A matches, he scored 2 runs.

In currently plays club cricket for Market Harborough Cricket Club in the Leicestershire Premier Cricket League.
