= Neal Mackey =

English cricketer

Personal information
- Full name: Neal Alexander Scott Mackey
- Born: 10 February 1983 (age 43); Leicester, Leicestershire, England
- Batting: Right-handed
- Bowling: Right-arm medium-fast

Domestic team information
- Years: Team
- 2002: Leicestershire Cricket Board

Career statistics
Competition	LA
Matches	1
Runs scored	25
Batting average	25.00
100s/50s	–/–
Top score	25
Balls bowled	–
Wickets	–
Bowling average	–
5 wickets in innings	–
10 wickets in match	–
Best bowling	–
Catches/stumpings	–/–
- Source: Cricinfo, 15 November 2010

Neal Alexander Scott Mackey (born 10 February 1983) is an English cricketer. Mackey is a right-handed batsman who bowls right-arm medium-fast. He was born in Leicester, Leicestershire.

Mackey represented the Leicestershire Cricket Board in a single List A match against the Kent Cricket Board in the 2nd round of the 2003 Cheltenham & Gloucester Trophy which was held in 2002. In his only List A match he scored 25 runs.

In currently plays club cricket for Market Harborough Cricket Club in the Leicestershire Premier Cricket League.
