= Chris Griffin (disambiguation) =

Chris Griffin is a main character on the animated series Family Guy.

Chris Griffin may also refer to:

- Chris Griffin (politician) (born 1980), North Dakota politician
- Chris Griffin (musician) (1915–2005), American jazz trumpeter
- J. Chris Griffin, music producer

== See also ==
- Chris Griffiths (disambiguation)
- Kris Griffin (born 1981), American football player
