= Karl Smith =

Karl Smith may refer to:

- Karl Smith (athlete) (born 1959), Jamaican hurdler
- Karl Smith (cricketer) (born 1978), English cricketer
- Karl U. Smith (1907–1994), American physiologist, psychologist and behavioral cybernetician

== See also ==
- Carl Smith (disambiguation)
- Karla Smith, American judge (born 1969)
