= Carl Smith =

Carl Smith may refer to:

== Arts and entertainment ==
- Carl Frithjof Smith (1859–1917), Norwegian portrait and genre painter
- Carl "Tatti" Smith (1908–?), American jazz trumpeter
- Carl Smith (musician) (1927–2010), American country music singer

== Sports ==
- Carl Smith (canoeing) (1843–1928), Swedish military officer and early promoter of canoeing
- Carl Smith (ice hockey) (1917–1967), Canadian ice hockey winger
- Carl "Buster" Smith (1921–1992), American pool checkers and international draughts player
- Carl Smith (American football) (born 1948), American football coach
- Carl Smith (rower) (1962–2010), British lightweight rower
- Carl Smith (footballer) (born 1979), English professional footballer
- Carl H. Smith (1880–1964), American football player, coach, and athletic director

== Others ==
- Carl Smith (businessman) (1897–1979), New Zealand businessman
- Carl Smith (game designer), American game designer
- Carl Michael Smith (born 1944), American businessman and politician from Oklahoma
- Carl Herbert Smith (1950–2004), American computer scientist
- Carl Smith, American politician, candidate in the United States House of Representatives elections in Georgia, 2010

== Other uses ==
- Carl Smith Stadium, a stadium in Wise, Virginia

== See also ==
- Karl Smith (disambiguation)
- Carl Schmidt (disambiguation)
- Carl Schmitt (1888–1985), German philosopher, jurist and political theorist
