= James Bull =

James Bull may refer to:

- James J. Bull, professor of molecular biology
- James Bull (cricketer) (born 1976), English cricketer
- James G. Bull (1838–1927), mayor of Columbus, Ohio
