= Christopher Griffiths (cricketer) =

English cricketer

Personal information
- Full name: Christopher James Griffiths
- Born: 20 November 1971 (age 54); Bradford, Yorkshire, England
- Batting: Right-handed
- Bowling: Right-arm medium

Domestic team information
- Years: Team
- 1999–2001: Leicestershire Cricket Board

Career statistics
Competition	LA
Matches	3
Runs scored	38
Batting average	19.00
100s/50s	0/0
Top score	25
Balls bowled	168
Wickets	4
Bowling average	22.50
5 wickets in innings	0
10 wickets in match	0
Best bowling	2/19
Catches/stumpings	0/–
- Source: Cricinfo, 17 November 2010

Christopher James Griffiths (born 20 November 1971) is a former English cricketer. He was a right-handed batsman and right-arm medium pace bowler. He was born in Bradford, Yorkshire.

Griffiths represented the Leicestershire Cricket Board in 3 List A matches. These came against Hertfordshire in the 1999 NatWest Trophy, the Durham Cricket Board in the 2000 NatWest Trophy and the Northamptonshire Cricket Board in the 1st round of the 2002 Cheltenham & Gloucester Trophy which was played in 2001.

He later played club cricket for Market Harborough Cricket Club in the Leicestershire Premier Cricket League.
