= Karl Geary (cricketer) =

English cricketer

Personal information
- Full name: Karl Lewis Geary
- Born: 29 June 1982 (age 44); Nuneaton, Warwickshire, England
- Batting: Right-handed
- Role: Wicket-keeper

Domestic team information
- Years: Team
- 2001: Leicestershire Cricket Board

Career statistics
Competition	List A
Matches	2
Runs scored	0
Batting average	0.00
100s/50s	0/0
Top score	0
Catches/stumpings	1/0
- Source: Cricinfo, 16 November 2010

Karl Lewis Geary (born 29 June 1982) is an English cricketer. Geary is a right-handed batsman who plays primarily as a wicket-keeper. He was born at Nuneaton, Warwickshire.

Geary represented the Leicestershire Cricket Board in two List A matches against the Northamptonshire Cricket Board and the Kent Cricket Board in the 1st and 2nd rounds of the 2002 Cheltenham & Gloucester Trophy which were held in 2001.

He currently plays club cricket for Leicester Ivanhoe Cricket Club in the Leicestershire and Rutland Cricket League.
