= Paul Fisher (cricketer, born 1977) =

English cricketer (born 1977)

Personal information
- Full name: Paul Gavin Breedon Fisher
- Born: 17 May 1977; Leicester, Leicestershire, England
- Died: 25 August 2025 (aged 48)
- Batting: Right-handed
- Bowling: Slow left-arm orthodox

Domestic team information
- Years: Team
- 1999–2001: Leicestershire Cricket Board

Career statistics
Competition	LA
Matches	3
Runs scored	1
Batting average	–
100s/50s	0/0
Top score	1*
Balls bowled	174
Wickets	1
Bowling average	120.00
5 wickets in innings	0
10 wickets in match	0
Best bowling	1/18
Catches/stumpings	2/–
- Source: Cricinfo, 8 September 2025

Paul Gavin Breedon Fisher (17 May 1977 – 25 August 2025) was an English cricketer. Fisher played as a right-handed batsman who bowled slow left-arm orthodox. He was born in Leicester, Leicestershire.

Fisher represented the Leicestershire Cricket Board in three List A matches. These came against Hertfordshire in the 1999 NatWest Trophy, Durham Cricket Board in the 2000 NatWest Trophy, and Warwickshire Cricket Board in the 2001 Cheltenham & Gloucester Trophy. He scored a single run, took two catches and took a single wicket at a bowling average of 124.00, with best figures of 1/18.

He played club cricket for Loughborough Town Cricket Club in the Leicestershire Premier Cricket League.
