= Paul Widdowson =

English cricketer (born 1974)

Personal information
- Full name: Paul Stuart Widdowson
- Born: 27 March 1974 (age 52); Leicester, Leicestershire, England
- Batting: Right-handed
- Bowling: Right-arm medium

Domestic team information
- Years: Team
- 2000: Leicestershire Cricket Board

Career statistics
Competition	LA
Matches	1
Runs scored	11
Batting average	11.00
100s/50s	–/–
Top score	11
Balls bowled	24
Wickets	1
Bowling average	12.00
5 wickets in innings	–
10 wickets in match	–
Best bowling	1/12
Catches/stumpings	–/–
- Source: Cricinfo, 16 November 2010

Paul Stuart Widdowson (born 27 March 1974) is an English cricketer. Widdowson is a right-handed batsman who bowls right-arm medium pace. He was born at Leicester, Leicestershire.

Widdowson represented the Leicestershire Cricket Board in a single List A match against the Durham Cricket Board in the 2000 NatWest Trophy. In his only List A match he scored 11 runs and with the ball he took a single wicket at a cost of 12 runs.

He currently plays club cricket for Kegworth Town Cricket Club in the Leicestershire Premier Cricket League.
