= Moris Freiburghaus =

Canadian film director, producer, and screenwriter

- Born: 1989 (age 36–37); Graubünden, Switzerland
- Education: Zurich University of the Arts
- Occupations: film director, producer, screenwriter
- Notable work: I Love You, I Leave You

Moris Freiburghaus is a Swiss filmmaker and director. His directorial debut, I Love You, I Leave You, received the Golden Eye for Best Documentary Film and the Audience Award at the 2025 Zurich Film Festival, marking the first time a Swiss production won the documentary competition at the festival.

== Early life and education ==
Freiburghaus (born 1989) is from Graubünden, Switzerland. He grew up in the city of Chur, where he developed an early interest in visual arts and filmmaking. During his youth, he created skateboarding videos, which marked some of his earliest filmmaking experiences.

Freiburghaus studied film at the Zurich University of the Arts (ZHdK), where he completed a bachelor's degree in film in 2016.

== Career ==
Freiburghaus made his feature directorial debut with the documentary I Love You, I Leave You. The film follows musician Dino Brandão during a manic episode and documents the impact of mental illness on personal relationships and family life.

Freiburghaus and Brandão had previously collaborated on a short film about similar themes, which preceded the production of I Love You, I Leave You. He described filming the documentary as emotionally challenging, stating that "filming your best friend slipping into a difficult time can already be perceived as borderline."

The film premiered at the Zurich Film Festival in 2025, where it won the Golden Eye for Best Documentary Film and the Audience Award. With this win, it became the first Swiss production to receive the festival’s documentary competition prize. The film also received a special mention from the festival’s Critics’ Jury.
