= Richard Hutchings =

English cricketer

Personal information
- Full name: Richard Martin Hutchings
- Born: 6 May 1978 (age 48); Leicester, Leicestershire, England
- Batting: Right-handed
- Role: Wicket-keeper

Domestic team information
- Years: Team
- 1999–2001: Leicestershire Cricket Board

Career statistics
Competition	List A
Matches	4
Runs scored	28
Batting average	7.00
100s/50s	0/0
Top score	15
Catches/stumpings	2/–
- Source: Cricinfo, 17 November 2010

Richard Martin Hutchings (born 6 May 1978) is an English cricketer. Hutchings is a right-handed batsman who plays primarily as a wicket-keeper. He was born in Leicester, Leicestershire.

Hutchings represented the Leicestershire Cricket Board in List A cricket. His debut List A match came against Hertfordshire in the 1999 NatWest Trophy. From 1999 to 2001, he represented the Board in four List A matches, the last of which came against the Kent Cricket Board in the 2nd round of the 2002 Cheltenham & Gloucester Trophy which was played in 2001.

In his 4 List A matches, he scored 28 runs at a batting average of 7.00, with a high score of 15. In the field he took 2 catches. Despite being able to play as a wicket-keeper, he did not keep wicket for the Board.

From 2004 to 2009, he played for Hinckley Town in the Leicestershire Premier League.
