= Carl Crowe =

English cricketer (born 1975)

Personal information
- Full name: Carl Daniel Crowe
- Born: 25 November 1975 (age 50); Leicester, Leicestershire, England
- Batting: Right-handed
- Bowling: Right-arm off break
- Role: Berkshire player-coach
- Relatives: Craig Crowe (brother)

Domestic team information
- Years: Team
- 1995–2002: Leicestershire
- 2003–2012: Berkshire
- 2009: Leicestershire

Career statistics
Competition	FC	LA	T20
Matches	42	40	1
Runs scored	695	187	9
Batting average	15.79	15.58	9.00
100s/50s	–/–	–/–	–/–
Top score	44*	23*	9
Balls bowled	4,534	1,334	–
Wickets	60	33	–
Bowling average	37.85	32.45	–
5 wickets in innings	–	–	–
10 wickets in match	–	–	–
Best bowling	4/47	4/30	–
Catches/stumpings	18/–	10/–	–/–
- Source: Cricinfo, 23 September 2010

Carl Daniel Crowe (born 25 November 1975) is an English former first-class cricketer. Crowe was a right-handed batsman and right-arm off break bowler. He was born in Leicester, Leicestershire.

Crowe made his first-class debut for Leicestershire in the 1995 County Championship against Warwickshire. From 1995 to 2009, he represented the county in 42 first-class matches, the last of which came in the 2009 County Championship when Leicestershire played Gloucestershire. In his 42 first-class matches, he scored 695 runs at a batting average of 15.79, with a high score of 44*. With the ball he took 60 wickets at a bowling average of 37.85, with best figures of 4/47.

Crowe also represented Leicestershire in 38 List-A matches, with his debut in that format for the county coming in the 1996 AXA Equity and Law League when Leicestershire played Middlesex. From 1996 to 2009, he represented the county in 38 List-A matches, with his final appearance for the county in that format coming against Worcestershire in the 2009 Friends Provident Trophy. In his 38 List-A matches for the county, he scored 184 runs at an average of 18.40, with a high score of 23*. With the ball he took 32 wickets for the county at an average of 32.00, with best figures of 4/30.

Crowe also represented Leicestershire in a single Twenty20 match in the 2009 Twenty20 Cup against Derbyshire at Grace Road, Leicester. During the match in scored 9 runs. Crowe left the county at the end of the 2009 season.

While representing Leicestershire, Crowe also represented Berkshire in the Minor Counties Championship, making his debut for the county in the 2003 Championship against Cheshire. From 2003 to present, he represented has represented the county in 33 Minor Counties Championship matches. Crowe has also played in the MCCA Knockout Trophy for Berkshire. His debut in that competition for the county came in 2003 when Berkshire played Hertfordshire. From 2003 to present, he has represented the county in 27 Trophy matches.

He also played a single 2 List-A matches for Berkshire, firstly in the 2004 Cheltenham & Gloucester Trophy against Kent and lastly against Gloucestershire in the 2005 Cheltenham & Gloucester Trophy at Sonning Lane, Reading. In his 2 List-A matches he scored 3 runs at an average of 1.50, with a high score of 2. With the ball he took a single wicket at a cost of 47. Crowe holds the role of Berkshire player-coach.

== Coaching career ==
He has worked as spin bowling coach for Kolkata Knight Riders and Trinbago Knight Riders. He is currently working with Lucknow Super Giants as a spin bowling coach.

== Family ==
His brother Craig has played List-A cricket for the Leicestershire Cricket Board, as well as playing Minor counties cricket for Berkshire.
