= Hans Tolford =

Austrian artist (1944–2013)

Hans Tolford (October 1, 1944 – 3 September 2013) was an Austrian painter, poet, photographer, filmmaker, author and illustrator.

== Biography ==
Tolford was the son of the carpenter Herbert Tolford. He was raised by his father. Hans Tolford's mother, Juliane Tolford, died during the war in 1945. He was educated from Akademie der bildenden Künste (BFA), Zürcher Hochschule der Künste (MFA), and Académie des Beaux-Arts (ph.d).

By the time he completed his masters education in Fine Art at the Zürcher Hochschule der Künste in 1967, he was already part of the important experimental art collective "Zü'Klingen'Rich" and was working primarily as a photographer, writer and an illustrating artist which he pursued till his death 3 September 2013.

Tolford's latest project is called "October Dance". Tolford gathered three musicians to perform and interprets his illustrations into music. He started the project in 2012. The band continued to exist after Tolfords death.

== Selected exhibitions ==
- Bankgasse Galerie, Wien, Austria - Menschen ich treffe mit Text.
- Bastai für die Kunst, Wien, Austria – Melting Pictures/ Schmelz-Bildern
- Kreis 4 Galerie, Zürich, Schweiz – 6 Moon
- Galerie Gmurzynska, Zürich, Schweiz - Symmetrische Arbeit
- Dorfstraße 7, Wangels, Germany – The machine in conducting a translating of a country's language.
