= Craig Crowe =

English cricketer (born 1979)

Personal information
- Full name: Craig Piers Crowe
- Born: 18 November 1979 (age 46); Leicester, Leicestershire, England
- Batting: Right-handed
- Bowling: Right-arm medium
- Relatives: Carl Crowe (brother)

Domestic team information
- Years: Team
- 2007–2010: Berkshire
- 2000–2002: Leicestershire Cricket Board

Career statistics
Competition	LA
Matches	4
Runs scored	79
Batting average	19.75
100s/50s	–/–
Top score	35
Balls bowled	12
Wickets	–
Bowling average	–
5 wickets in innings	–
10 wickets in match	–
Best bowling	–
Catches/stumpings	1/–
- Source: Cricinfo, 30 September 2010

Craig Piers Crowe (born 18 November 1979) is an English cricketer. Crowe is a right-handed batsman who bowled right-arm medium pace. He was born at Leicester, Leicestershire.

Crowe made his List-A debut for the Leicestershire Cricket Board against Durham Cricket Board in the 2000 NatWest Trophy. From 2000 to 2002, he represented the Board in 4 List-A matches, the last of which came against the Kent Cricket Board in the 2nd round of the 2003 Cheltenham & Gloucester Trophy which was played in 2002. In his 4 List-A matches, he scored 79 runs at a batting average of 19.75, with a high score of 35.

In 2007, Crowe made his debut for Berkshire in the 2007 Minor Counties Championship against Wales Minor Counties. From 2007 to present, he has represented the county in 19 Minor Counties Championships matches. He has also represented Berkshire in 13 MCCA Knockout Trophy matches from 2007 to present.

Crowe has also played Second XI cricket for the Leicestershire Second XI, Somerset Second XI, Derbyshire Second XI, Sussex Second XI, Nottinghamshire Second XI and the Worcestershire Second XI.

== Family ==
His brother Carl has played first-class cricket for Leicestershire and has also represented Berkshire in Minor Counties and List-A cricket.
