= I Love You, I Leave You =

Swiss documentary film

- Directed by: Moris Freiburghaus
- Written by: Moris Freiburghaus; Dino Brandão
- Produced by: Fabiana Seitz; Moris Freiburghaus; Leon Schwitter
- Starring: Dino Brandão; Iseh Kissacah; Moris Freiburghaus; Tillmann Ostendarp
- Cinematography: Ramón Königshausen
- Edited by: Michael Karrer
- Music by: Dino Brandão
- Production company: Sabotage Filmkollektiv GmbH
- Distributed by: Outside The Box Sarl Distribution
- Release date: September 2025 (Zurich Film Festival)
- Running time: 94 minutes
- Country: Switzerland
- Languages: French, English, Portuguese, German

I Love You, I Leave You is a Swiss documentary film directed by Moris Freiburghaus and written by Freiburghaus and singer Dino Brandão. The film follows Brandão during a manic episode and documents the efforts of his friends and family to support him while navigating interactions with healthcare institutions and law enforcement.

The film premiered at the 21st Zurich Film Festival on 28 September 2025, where it won the Golden Eye for Best Documentary and the Audience Award, becoming the first Swiss film to win the documentary competition at the festival.

== Plot ==
After visiting Angola, the homeland of his father, musician Dino Brandão experiences a manic episode that begins to affect his relationships with those around him. His sister, mother, and partner struggle to reach him as his behaviour becomes increasingly erratic.

Concerned for his wellbeing, Brandão's close friend Moris Freiburghaus travels to stay with him and attempts to support him during the episode. Brandão resists clinical treatment and medication, which leads to repeated conflicts with authorities and several police interventions. As the situation escalates, Freiburghaus and Brandão's father try to find ways to help him while balancing their own emotional strain.

The film incorporates footage filmed by Freiburghaus as well as material recorded by Brandão himself, including self-recorded video and scenes documenting daily interactions with friends, family, and institutions.

== Cast ==
- Dino Brandão
- Iseh Kissacah
- Moris Freiburghaus
- Tillmann Ostendarp

== Production ==
I Love You, I Leave You developed from a long-standing collaboration between director Moris Freiburghaus and Dino Brandão. Ten years before the documentary, the two had made a short film about Brandão's first hospitalization. According to Freiburghaus, the project began after Brandão was admitted to a clinic again in 2023 during a manic-psychotic episode, prompting the two to revisit the subject. Freiburghaus and Brandão, together with Brandão's family, later decided to document the episode and its aftermath on film.

The film was produced by Sabotage Filmkollektiv GmbH, with Fabiana Seitz, Freiburghaus and Leon Schwitter serving as producers.

The film's soundtrack was composed and recorded by Brandão in collaboration with his band and other musicians. Some of the songs were written during the manic episode documented in the film. The soundtrack was released on 6 November 2025, the same day the film opened in Swiss cinemas.

== Release ==
I Love You, I Leave You premiered at the Zurich Film Festival in September 2025, where it won the Golden Eye for Best Documentary and the Audience Award, and also received a special mention from the festival's Critics’ Jury.

It was released in Switzerland on 6 November 2025, distributed by Outside the Box Sarl Distribution.

In January 2026, the film screened at the Solothurn Film Festival.

== Reception ==
A review for OutNow described I Love You, I Leave You as an intimate documentary that offers a close look at the effects of mental illness on both the individual experiencing it and those around them. The reviewer noted that the film balances moments of humor with the seriousness of Brandão's manic episode, highlighting interactions between Brandão, his family, and friend Moris Freiburghaus.
