= Plus Life Media =

Media company focusing on HIV awareness

Plus Life
- Type: Media company
- Founded: 2019; 7 years ago
- Founders: Karl Schmid, Brent Zacky, Mike Spierer
- Headquarters: Los Angeles, California, United States
- Website: pluslifemedia.com

Plus Life (stylized as +Life) is a multi-platform digital media brand that produces original programming focused on HIV awareness, education, and reducing stigma. Plus Life was created by journalist Karl Schmid, in partnership with producers Brent Zacky and Mike Spierer, to combine journalism, storytelling, and advocacy in a digital format.

== History ==
Plus Life Media was co-founded in 2019 by Karl Schmid, Brent Zacky and Mike Spierer in collaboration with the LA-based production company AOMedia.

Plus Life conducts interviews with medical professionals, advocates, and people living with HIV, along with creating lifestyle segments. It has also participated in collaborations with advocacy organizations and media partners in support of HIV awareness initiatives, including World AIDS Day.

== Programming ==
Plus Life's programming includes recurring series and specials.

=== +Talk ===
+Talk is a weekly talk show hosted by Karl Schmid that features interviews with people living with HIV, clinicians, advocates, and public figures. Episodes cover topics related to HIV, including diagnosis, treatment, stigma, relationships, and mental health.

=== What’s the Jeuge ===
What’s the Jeuge is a digital talk series hosted by actress, model and transgender activist Gracie Cartier. The series covers topics related to stigma, mental health, wellness, and healthcare disparities affecting Black, transgender, and HIV-positive communities. Cartier, who has publicly disclosed her HIV-positive status, serves as the host.

=== HIV Unwrapped ===
HIV Unwrapped is an initiative produced by Plus Life that involves collaboration between HIV researchers and emerging fashion designers. The result of this initiative is fashion designs that are created with HIV-related scientific concepts as well as lived experiences in mind. These designs are then presented through runway events and accompanying media content.

The first United States edition of HIV Unwrapped took place during New York Fashion Week on September 13, 2025, at the Nexus Club in New York City. The event paired HIV researchers with fashion designers, including students from Parsons School of Design, with the resulting garments presented in a “lab-to-runway” format.

The U.S. edition was produced in partnership with organizations including GLAAD, EqualPride, and the Australasian Society for HIV, Viral Hepatitis and Sexual Health Medicine (ASHM), with additional support from the Council of Fashion Designers of America (CFDA) and design mentorship provided by the fashion brand Tanner Fletcher. Gilead Sciences served as a principal sponsor.

A one-hour companion special titled HIV Unwrapped was produced for Hulu and ABC and released on November 30, 2025. The program includes behind-the-scenes footage from New York Fashion Week, interviews, and runway segments.

== Notable guests ==
Plus Life programming has featured medical experts, advocates, artists, and public figures involved in HIV advocacy, LGBTQ+ visibility, public health, and cultural storytelling. Guests have included:

- Anthony Fauci – former Chief Medical Advisor to the U.S. President
- Demetre Daskalakis – physician and public-health leader
- Nancy Pelosi – former Speaker of the U.S. House of Representatives
- Billy Porter – actor and advocate
- Jonathan Van Ness – TV personality and LGBTQ+ advocate
- Steven Canals – creator and writer of Pose

== Awards and nominations ==
Year	Award	Category / Work	Result	Ref
2022	GLAAD Media Awards	Outstanding Online Journalism	Nominated	
2024	GLAAD Media Awards	Outstanding Online Journalism	Nominated	
2024	GLAAD Media Awards	Barbara Gittings Award for Excellence in LGBT Journalism	Won	
