= Serge Stauffer =

Swiss artist and art educator

Serge Stauffer (born Werner Oscar Stauffer, 8 June 1929 – 17 September 1989) was a Swiss artist and art educator. He was one of the co-founders of the F+F Schule für experimentelle Gestaltung in Zurich and known for his German translations of the works of Marcel Duchamp. Stauffer can be considered to have pioneered art as research.

== Life and work ==
From 1952 to 1955, Stauffer trained as a photographer under Hans Finsler and Alfred Willimann at the Kunstgewerbeschule Zürich KGSZ. During this period, he met his future wife Doris Stauffer-Kloetzer.

Stauffer first became known for his German translation of Eugène Ionesco's play The Bald Soprano, which premiered at the Klein-Theater Bern in 1956 (among other actors, its cast included Daniel Spoerri) and was published by Luchterhand in 1959.

As a photographer, Stauffer worked for Josef Müller-Brockmann’s graphic design studio, before returning to the KGSZ in 1957 to teach photographics and experimental photography. From 1957 to 1964, he designed exhibitions, catalogs, and posters. Among other projects, he worked on Dokumentation über Marcel Duchamp (1960), an exhibition organised by Max Bill at Zurich’s Museum of Design. Stauffer’s early work includes the playful object Jardin public (1960), which was published as an edition at the Moderna Museet in Stockholm in 1961. In the period 1962–1964, he undertook comprehensive studies on optical illusions, which he called geometrical-optical illusions (g.o.t), using geometrical drawings and photogrammes. From 1964 to 1965 Stauffer taught at the Bath Academy of Art, in Corsham, England.

In 1964, Stauffer and Hansjörg Mattmüller laid the foundation for an experimental arts class. A year later, in 1965, the class opened its doors as the F+F (short for "Form und Farbe", i.e., form and colour) at the KGSZ. Following a move to abolish the F+F course on Teamwork, established by Doris Stauffer, and to introduce "unacceptable teaching conditions", in March 1970 a council of students and teachers jointly decided to dissolve the F+F and to dismiss all teaching staff. Following this decision, Bendicht Fivian, Peter Gygax, Peter Jenny, Hansjörg Mattmüller, Doris Stauffer, and Serge Stauffer established the F+F Schule für experimentelle Gestaltung, a privately run art school, in January 1971. One of their rolemodels for a liberated art-education was the Summerhill School in Leiston, Suffolk, England.

Tom Holert, the German art historian, has described how artists like Allan Kaprow, Nam June Paik, Asger Jorn, and the artist and philosopher Piero Simondo had been exploring possibilities for conducting artistic research since the 1950s and 60s. Already while teaching at the KGSZ, Stauffer had started elaborating concepts for art as research. In 1968, he delivered a paper at the conference of the Schweizerische Werkbund (SWB) on the artist as researcher. In 1976, he presented his Thesen zu Kunst als Forschung [Theses on Art as Research] within the context of an F+F exhibition held in the lobby of the Kunsthaus Zürich. In 1978–79, Stauffer lectured on "Art as Research" at the Department of Art History of the University of Zurich. In 1981, he published an essay on "Art as Research" in the book Genie gibt′s – Die siebziger Jahre an der F&F Schule für experimentelle Gestaltung.

From 1956 to 1967, Stauffer entered into a lengthy correspondence with Marcel Duchamp, whose work he explored in great detail. His extensive research on Duchamp led to the publication in 1973 of the book Ready Made – 180 Aussprüche aus Interviews mit Marcel Duchamp. This was followed in 1981 by Die Schriften – Zu Lebzeiten veröffentlichte Texte mit übersetzten und faksimilierten Texten von Marcel Duchamp, which Stauffer co-edited with Theo Ruff. The volume Marcel Duchamp: Interviews und Statements was published posthumously in 1992.

Stauffer maintained a lifelong friendship with the Swiss artist and poet André Thomkins, which resulted in an extensive correspondence. Their friendship is documented in Thomkins’s monograph Oh! Cet Echo! (1985). Serge and Doris Stauffer’s estate is housed at Swiss National Library in Bern, Serge Stauffer's studies on Duchamp at the Duchamp Cabinet in the Staatsgalerie Stuttgart. His life and work, and his reflections on "Art as Research", are the subject of a research project launched in 2011 at the Institute of Contemporary Art Research of Zurich University of the Arts (ZHdK). Based on this research project the exhibition "Serge Stauffer – Kunst als Forschung" opened at Helmhaus Zürich (2013).

== Selected works ==
- ca. 1955, Post Card – ready made in Europe, photographic postcards
- 1961, Jardin public, playing cards’ edition, Edition by Moderna Museet Stockholm
- 1962–64, geometrisch-optische Täuschungen (g.o.T.), artistic studies
- 1968, b-room, graphic print edition
- ca. 1980, an einem ohr blind, projekt einer weltsprache, card game

A list of works was published in "Helmhaus Zürich (ed.): Serge Stauffer, Kunst als Forschung, Zurich: Scheidegger & Spiess Edition, 2013, pp.287–301".

== Editions and translations (selected) ==
- Eugène Ionesco: Die kahle Sängerin. Translated from French by Serge Stauffer. In: Eugène Ionesco: Theaterstücke. Vol. 1. Darmstadt: Luchterhand Verlag, 1959.
- Hans-Rudolf Lutz, Hansjörg Mattmüller, Serge Stauffer (eds.): Experiment F+F. 1965–1970. Zürich: Verlag H.R. Lutz, [1970].
- Marcel Duchamp: Ready Made! 180 Aussprüche aus Interviews mit Marcel Duchamp. Ed. Serge Stauffer. Zürich: Regenbogen Verlag, 1973.
- Marcel Duchamp: Die Schriften. Band 1. Zu Lebzeiten veröffentlichte Texte. Translated, commented, and edited by Serge Stauffer. Zürich: Regenbogen-Verlag, 1981.
- André Thomkins, Serge Stauffer: Correspondance 1948–1977. Transcription et montage par Serge Stauffer. Stuttgart, London: Edition Hansjörg Mayer, 1985.
- Serge Stauffer: Marcel Duchamp. Interviews und Statements. Gesammelt, übersetzt und annotiert von Serge Stauffer. Ed. Ulrike Gauss. Stuttgart: Graphische Sammlung Staatsgalerie Stuttgart; Ostfildern-Ruit: Edition Cantz, 1992.

== Articles, book contributions (selection) ==
- "Stilgeschichte des Films". In: Hans Fischli, Willy Rotzler (eds.): Der Film. Geschichte, Technik, Gestaltungsmittel, Bedeutung. [exhibition catalog]. Zürich: Kunstgewerbemuseum, 1960. Unpaginated
- "Der Traum eines Briefträgers". In: du, Kulturelle Monatsschrift, no. 247, September 1961. p. 47f.
- "100 Fragen [questions for Karl Gerstner, Dieter Roth, Daniel Spoerri, André Thomkins]". In: Karl Gerstner et al. (eds.): freunde + freunde. friends + fruend. [published to accompany the exhibition Fründ, friends, Freunde und Freunde at the Kunsthalle Bern and the Kunsthalle Düsseldorf]. Stuttgart: Edition Hansjörg Mayer, 1969. Unpaginated.
- "Kunst als Forschung". In: Gerhard Johann Lischka, Hansjörg Mattmüller (eds.): Genie gibt′s. Die siebziger Jahre an der F&F Schule für experimentelle Gestaltung. Frankfurt am Main: Betzel Verlag, 1981. pp. 61–92.
- "« L′homme le plus sérieux du monde ». Marcel Duchamp als Schachspieler". In: du. Die Kunstzeitschrift, no. 1, 1982. pp. 62–65.
- "Brief". In: André Thomkins: Oh! Cet Echo! André Thomkins an Serge Stauffer. Dokumente einer Freundschaft mit Echo. Stuttgart, London: Edition Hansjörg Mayer, 1985. pp. 41–59.

== Literature ==
- Konrad Heidkamp: "Lächelnd im Schatten, sogar. Porträt und Nachruf: Serge Stauffer". In: WOZ, no. 42, 20. October 1989. p. 19.
- Franziska Wiesner: "Serge Stauffer. Jardin Public". In: Fabrikzeitung, no. 276 (PDF; 2,8 MB), November 2011. Unpaginated.
- Helmhaus Zürich (ed.): Serge Stauffer, Kunst als Forschung, Zurich: Scheidegger & Spiess Edition, 2013. ISBN 978-3-85881-377-0
