= James Smith (Leicestershire cricketer) =

English cricketer (born 1977)

Personal information
- Full name: James Douglas Smith
- Born: 21 April 1977 (age 49); Leicester, Leicestershire, England
- Batting: Right-handed
- Role: Wicket-keeper

Domestic team information
- Years: Team
- 1999–2000: Leicestershire Cricket Board

Career statistics
Competition	LA
Matches	2
Runs scored	13
Batting average	13.00
100s/50s	0/0
Top score	11
Catches/stumpings	1/0
- Source: Cricinfo, 17 November 2010

James Douglas Smith (born 21 April 1977) is a former English cricketer. Smith was a right-handed batsman who played primarily as a wicket-keeper. He was born in Leicester, Leicestershire.

== Cricketing career ==
Smith represented the Leicestershire Cricket Board in two List A matches. These came against Hertfordshire in the 1999 NatWest Trophy and the Durham Cricket Board in the 2000 NatWest Trophy. In his 2 List A matches, he scored 13 runs at a batting average of 13.00, with a high score of 11. His one not out innings resulted in him having a higher batting average than his highest score. Behind the stumps he took a single catch.
