= HIV Unwrapped =

Fashion and science initiative focused on HIV awareness

- Founded: 2024
- Founder: Brent Allan
- Type: Advocacy initiative
- Purpose: HIV awareness and stigma reduction
- Region served: International
- Key people: Brent Allan; Karl Schmid

HIV Unwrapped is a global HIV/AIDS awareness and advocacy initiative founded in Australia in 2024 by Brent Allan, a community engagement expert and HIV activist. The project brings together emerging fashion designers with HIV scientists and researchers to create garments inspired by scientific research, lived experience, and efforts to reduce stigma surrounding HIV/AIDS.

Since its inception, HIV Unwrapped has expanded internationally, with activations in Australia, the United Kingdom, Rwanda, and the United States.

== Concept ==
HIV Unwrapped pairs scientists working in HIV research with fashion designers to translate complex medical and social concepts into wearable designs. The initiative uses fashion as a communication tool to reach broader audiences beyond traditional public health channels.

Design collaborations often incorporate themes such as HIV prevention, treatment, stigma, and identity, with garments reflecting both scientific concepts and personal narratives from those affected by HIV.

The initiative has been described as a fusion of science, storytelling, and fashion aimed at reframing public perception of HIV and promoting dialogue around stigma and awareness.

== International expansion ==
HIV Unwrapped originated in Australia in 2024 and was later presented in multiple international contexts, including a version in Rwanda during the International AIDS Society conference and subsequent activations in the United Kingdom and United States.

== New York Fashion Week (2025) ==
In September 2025, HIV Unwrapped debuted its first United States edition during New York Fashion Week. The event was produced by Plus Life Media and hosted by Karl Schmid.

The runway presentation paired students from Parsons School of Design with HIV researchers to create “lab-to-runway” garments inspired by molecular science and lived experiences of people affected by HIV.

The U.S. edition was supported by Gilead Sciences and presented in partnership with organizations including GLAAD, EqualPride, and the Australasian Society for HIV, Viral Hepatitis and Sexual Health Medicine (ASHM), with additional support from the Council of Fashion Designers of America.

== Television special ==
An accompanying television special titled HIV Unwrapped was produced by ABC and Hulu and released on November 30, 2025, in recognition of World AIDS Day.

The special, hosted and executive produced by Karl Schmid, includes runway footage, interviews, and behind-the-scenes documentation of the collaborations between scientists and designers.
