= James Bull (cricketer) =

English cricketer

Personal information
- Full name: James Jonathan Bull
- Born: 22 December 1976 (age 49); Leicester, Leicestershire, England
- Batting: Right-handed
- Bowling: Right-arm off break

Domestic team information
- Years: Team
- 2001: Leicestershire Cricket Board
- 1996–1999: Oxford University

Career statistics
Competition	FC	LA
Matches	11	1
Runs scored	246	10
Batting average	15.37	10.00
100s/50s	–/–	–/–
Top score	49	10
Balls bowled	–	24
Wickets	–	1
Bowling average	–	12.00
5 wickets in innings	–	–
10 wickets in match	–	–
Best bowling	–	1/12
Catches/stumpings	1/–	1/–
- Source: Cricinfo, 16 November 2010

James Jonathan Bull (born 22 December 1976) is an English cricketer. Bull is a right-handed batsman who bowls right-arm off break. He was born at Leicester, Leicestershire.

Bull made his first-class debut for Oxford University against Northamptonshire in 1996. From 1996 to 1999, he represented the university in 11 first-class matches, the last of which came against Cambridge University. In his 11 first-class matches, he scored 246 runs at a batting average of 15.37, with a high score of 47. In the field he took a single catch.

In 2001, Bull represented the Leicestershire Cricket Board in a single List A match against the Warwickshire Cricket Board in the 2001 Cheltenham & Gloucester Trophy. In his only List A match he scored 10 runs and took a single catch. With the ball he took a single wicket at a cost of 12 runs.

He currently plays club cricket for Loughborough Town Cricket Club in the Leicestershire Premier Cricket League.
