= Dan Furnival =

English cricketer (born 1978)

Personal information
- Full name: Daniel William Furnival
- Born: 25 October 1978 (age 48); Ashford, Kent, England
- Batting: Right-handed
- Bowling: Leg break

Domestic team information
- Years: Team
- 2001: Leicestershire Cricket Board

Career statistics
Competition	LA
Matches	1
Runs scored	9
Batting average	9.00
100s/50s	–/–
Top score	9
Balls bowled	–
Wickets	–
Bowling average	–
5 wickets in innings	–
10 wickets in match	–
Best bowling	–
Catches/stumpings	–/–
- Source: Cricinfo, 15 November 2010

Daniel 'Dan' William Furnival (born 25 October 1978) is an English cricketer. Furnival is a right-handed batsman who bowls leg break. He was born in Ashford, Kent.

Furnival represented the Leicestershire Cricket Board in a single List A match against the Kent Cricket Board in the 2nd round of the 2002 Cheltenham & Gloucester Trophy which was held in 2001. In his only List A match he scored 9 runs.

He currently plays club cricket for Hythe Cricket Club in the Kent Cricket League. In recent times he has become a renowned cricket tipster, with regular trips across the globe, advising betting syndicates. In one particular country he is known as लीमे लीजेंड which translates to: the limey legend.
