= Olsen Murrain =

Montserratian-born English cricketer (born 1982)

Personal information
- Full name: Olsen Tzuan Murrain
- Born: 24 April 1982 (age 44); Montserrat
- Batting: Right-handed
- Bowling: Right-arm medium

Domestic team information
- Years: Team
- 2001: Leicestershire Cricket Board

Career statistics
Competition	LA
Matches	2
Runs scored	0
Batting average	0.00
100s/50s	–/–
Top score	0
Balls bowled	96
Wickets	–
Bowling average	–
5 wickets in innings	–
10 wickets in match	–
Best bowling	–
Catches/stumpings	–/–
- Source: Cricinfo, 16 November 2010

Olsen Tzuan Murrain (born 24 April 1982) is a Montserratian born English cricketer. Murrain is a right-handed batsman who bowls right-arm medium pace. He was born on the Caribbean island of Montserrat.

Murrain represented the Leicestershire Cricket Board in 2 List A matches against the Northamptonshire Cricket Board and Kent Cricket Board in the 1st and 2nd rounds of the 2002 Cheltenham & Gloucester Trophy which were held in 2001.
