= Carl Schmidt =

The given name Carl, Carol, Carlo or Karl and surname Schmid, Schmidt or Schmitt may refer to:

== Carl or Karl ==
- Carl Schmidt (chemist) (1822–1894), Livonian chemist also known as Karl Genrikhovich Schmidt
- Carl Wilhelm Schmidt (died 1864), German missionary also known as Karl Schmidt

== Carl ==
- Carl Schmitt (composer) (1837–1900), New Zealand violinist and composer
- Carl Schmidt (architect) (1866–1945), Russian architect
- Carl Schmidt (Coptologist) (1868–1938), German Coptologist
- Carl Schmidt (politician) (1835–1888), American politician
- Carl Schmidt (rower) (1904–1992), Danish rower
- Carl Friedrich Schmidt (artist) (1811–1890), German botanical artist and lithographer
- Carl Friedrich Schmidt (geologist) (1832–1908), Baltic German geologist and botanist
- Carl Schmitt (1888–1985), German jurist, political theorist and professor of law
- Carl Schmitt (artist) (1889–1989), American artist and writer
- Carl T. Schmidt (1906–1958), American scholar

== Carlo ==
- Carlo Schmid (German politician) (1896–1979), German academic and politician
- Carlo Schmid-Sutter (born 1950), Swiss politician

== Karl ==
- Karl Patterson Schmidt (1890–1957), American herpetologist
- Karl Schmid (rower) (1910–1998), Swiss rower
- Karl Schmidt (footballer) (1932–2018), German footballer
- Karl Schmidt-Hellerau (1873–1948), German social reformer
- Karl Schmidt-Rottluff (1884–1976), German painter
- Karl Schmitt-Walter (1900–1985), German operatic baritone
- Karl Shmidt (1846–1928), mayor of Kishinev
- Karl von Schmidt (1817–1875), Prussian cavalry general
- Karl Ludwig Schmidt (1891–1956), German Protestant theologian and professor of New Testament studies
- Karl Schmid (artist) (1914–1998), Swiss artist
- Karl Schmid (television presenter) (born 1980), television host and activist
- Karl Schmidt (broadcaster) (died 2016), American radio broadcaster

== See also ==
- Karl Schmidt Memorial, Chennai, Tamil Nadu, India, dedicated to a sailor who drowned in 1930 while saving a life
