= Alice Ruppert =

Swiss game designer and equestrian

- Born: Zurich
- Education: Zurich University of the Arts
- Occupations: Game designer, equestrian

Alice Ruppert is a Swiss game designer and equestrian. She is best known for her website The Mane Quest, dedicated solely to horse games, and for her work on horses in an assortment of video games. She is also the President of the Swiss Game Developers Association.

== Biography ==
Ruppert resides in Zurich. From a young age, she became passionate about video games, playing on her father's Windows 95 without a sound card with her sister. She has also ridden horses since she was a child, starting at the age of 8. She participated in a course for women in computer science at ETH Zurich after high school before interning at Ubisoft Zurich. She then studied game design at the Zurich University of the Arts, which she graduated from in 2015. From 2015 to 2021, she worked as the Head of Games for game console company AirConsole. She has also worked as a programmer.

In fall 2018, after reviewing and critiquing horses in video games for years, she began running a site called The Mane Quest, where she reviewed and critiqued horses in games. Criticisms focused both on significance of the horses and effectiveness of the mechanics, among others. As of 2021, the site had become known as "the internet's primary source of horse game discussion", both on the site itself and on its Discord. It also hosts a 500-page wiki, whose hub is called "The Mane Page". As a result of the site, she was dubbed "the expert on the genre" (horse games) by Galaxus. She has stated her reviews have often been considered in the development of games in the genre.

She has also discussed the challenges of making horses effectively in video games, from their gait and their joints to the struggles of animating four-legged creatures. She has alleged that "sexism and undervaluing female players and their interests play a big part" in the lack of major horse games despite the audience.

She has stated she is excited for The Witcher IV largely due to the care put into the horse modeling, which she stated made her "feel so seen". She has expressed mixed opinions about Umamusume: Pretty Derby, however, stating that while it will draw attention to real horses, it's not a true horse game.

Her criticisms of horses and their implementation in video games led her to becoming game company Aesir International's creative producer for a video game called Horse Tales: Save Emerald Valley. She joined the game when it was well in development, which made it a "daunting task", but she stated the game "has a chance to catapult the oft-neglected genre of horse games to a whole new level" on her blog. She has claimed to correct many small details in the horses that would break immersion. The game was reviewed positively by The Mary Sue, who cited its detailed horse breeding system, but received many negative reviews, which The Mary Sue accredits to expectations being "so high, it's almost inevitable any project will disappoint them".

She also creatively produced another Aesir game with significant horse-focused action, Windstorm: The Legend of Khiimari, and was involved in Equinox: Homecoming, Horses of Hoofprint Bay, and Pinkeep. She has since become a freelancer. She intends to create her own horse game.

Since July 2023, she has served as the President of the Swiss Game Developers Association. She has presented about the market potential of horse games at the Zurich Central Library. As of 2022, she still rides horses.
