= Gareth Parkin =

English cricketer

Personal information
- Full name: Gareth Steven Parkin
- Born: 5 October 1982 (age 44); Leicester, Leicestershire, England
- Batting: Right-handed
- Bowling: Right-arm medium-fast

Domestic team information
- Years: Team
- 2002: Leicestershire Cricket Board

Career statistics
Competition	LA
Matches	1
Runs scored	–
Batting average	–
100s/50s	–/–
Top score	–
Balls bowled	60
Wickets	1
Bowling average	62.00
5 wickets in innings	–
10 wickets in match	–
Best bowling	1/62
Catches/stumpings	–/–
- Source: Cricinfo, 15 November 2010

Gareth Steven Parkin (born 5 October 1982) is an English cricketer. Parkin is a right-handed batsman who bowls right-arm medium-fast. He was born in Leicester, Leicestershire.

Parkin represented the Leicestershire Cricket Board in a single List A match against Denmark in the 1st round of the 2003 Cheltenham & Gloucester Trophy which was held in 2002. In his only List A match he took a single wicket at a cost of 62 runs.
