= Hans Falk (painter) =

Swiss painter (1918–2002)

Hans Falk (1918–2002) was a Swiss painter and graphic artist. Born in Zurich, he studied in Lucerne and Zurich and later worked as a poster designer and freelance artist. He designed posters for Expo 64 and lived for periods in Stromboli, London, and New York.

== Early life and education ==
Hans Falk was born in Zurich in 1918. In 1935 he attended the Kunstgewerbeschule in Lucerne, where he studied under Joseph and Max von Moos. From 1935 to 1939 he trained as a graphic designer with Albert Rüegg in Zurich, while also attending the Kunstgewerbeschule there. In 1940 he formed a friendship and shared a studio with the photographer Werner Bischof. From 1942 to 1943 he studied at the Kunstgewerbeschule Zürich under Max Gubler and Walter Roshardt.

== Career ==
Between 1939 and 1941, Falk worked, among other things, for Walter Herdeg at Graphis Verlag. From 1950 to 1955 he taught at the Kunstgewerbeschule Zürich. He produced numerous posters, which he drew directly on stone, and as an artist worked for social aid organizations and political causes. Before designing two posters for Circus Knie, he spent two months accompanying the circus on tour. From 1955 onward he worked mainly as a freelance artist. For Expo 64 in Lausanne, he designed a series of seven abstract posters.

From 1958 to 1960 he stayed in Cornwall and Ireland. From 1960 to 1968 he lived on Stromboli. In 1968 he moved to London, and in 1973 he relocated to New York, where he also worked on assignments for Fortune magazine. After 1985 he lived in Urdorf near Zurich and on Stromboli. His major exhibitions included shows at the Aargauer Kunsthaus in 1972 and the Kunstverein Ludwigsburg in 1986. He died in 2002.
