= Luke Reeves =

English cricketer (born 1980)

Personal information
- Full name: Luke Reeves
- Born: 2 May 1980 (age 46); Adelaide, South Australia
- Batting: Right-handed
- Role: Wicketkeeper

Domestic team information
- Years: Team
- 2000–2001: Leicestershire Cricket Board

Career statistics
Competition	LA
Matches	3
Runs scored	6
Batting average	3.00
100s/50s	0/0
Top score	5
Catches/stumpings	1/–
- Source: Cricinfo, 17 November 2010

Luke Reeves (born 2 May 1980) is an Australian born English cricketer. Reeves is a right-handed batsman who plays primarily as a wicketkeeper. He was born at Adelaide, South Australia.

Reeves played for the Leicestershire Cricket Board in three List A matches. These came against the Durham Cricket Board in the 2000 NatWest Trophy, the Warwickshire Cricket Board in the 2001 Cheltenham & Gloucester Trophy and the Northamptonshire Cricket Board in the 1st round of the 2002 Cheltenham & Gloucester Trophy which were played in 2001.

In his three List A matches, he scored 6 runs at a batting average of 3.00, with a high score of 5. In the field he took a single catch. Reeves did not keep wicket in any of these matches.

He currently plays club cricket for Ashford Town Cricket Club in the Kent Cricket League.
