= Simon Pearson =

English cricketer

Personal information
- Full name: Simon Pearson
- Born: 8 May 1982 (age 44); England
- Batting: Left-handed
- Bowling: Leg break

Domestic team information
- Years: Team
- 2001: Leicestershire Cricket Board

Career statistics
Competition	List A
Matches	1
Runs scored	12
Batting average	12.00
100s/50s	0/0
Top score	12
Catches/stumpings	0/–
- Source: Cricinfo, 16 November 2010

Simon Pearson (born 8 May 1982) is a former English cricketer. Pearson was a left-handed batsman who bowled leg break.

Pearson made his debut for the Leicestershire Cricket Board in 1999 against Oxfordshire in the MCCA Knockout Trophy. He played one further MCCA Knockout Trophy match in 2001 against the Northamptonshire Cricket Board.

Pearson represented the Leicestershire Cricket Board in a single List A match against the Warwickshire Cricket Board in the 2001 Cheltenham & Gloucester Trophy. In his only List A match he scored 12 runs.
