= Adam Rennocks =

English cricketer

Personal information
- Full name: Adam Paul Rennocks
- Born: 29 January 1982 (age 44); Leicester, Leicestershire, England
- Batting: Right-handed
- Bowling: Left-arm medium

Domestic team information
- Years: Team
- 2001–2002: Leicestershire Cricket Board

Career statistics
Competition	LA
Matches	3
Runs scored	5
Batting average	–
100s/50s	–/–
Top score	3*
Balls bowled	144
Wickets	3
Bowling average	28.00
5 wickets in innings	–
10 wickets in match	–
Best bowling	1/23
Catches/stumpings	3/–
- Source: Cricinfo, 16 November 2010

Adam Paul Rennocks (born 29 January 1982) is an English cricketer. Rennocks is a right-handed batsman who bowls left-arm medium pace. He was born in Leicester, Leicestershire.

Rennocks represented the Leicestershire Cricket Board in 3 List A matches. These came against the Northamptonshire Cricket Board in the 1st round of the 2002 Cheltenham & Gloucester Trophy, and the Kent Cricket Board in the 2nd round of the same competition. Both matches were held in 2001. His third and final match came against the Kent Cricket Board in the 2nd round of the 2003 Cheltenham & Gloucester Trophy which was played in 2002. In his 3 List A matches, he took 3 wickets at a bowling average of 28.00, with best figures of 1/23.
