= Christopher Griffiths =

Christopher or Chris Griffiths may refer to:

- Christopher Griffiths (cricketer), English cricketer
- N. Christopher Griffiths, American lawyer from Delaware
- Chris Griffiths (field hockey), English field hockey player
- Chris Griffiths (dermatologist), professor of dermatology
