= Lee Pollard =

English cricketer

Personal information
- Full name: Lee Gordon Pollard
- Born: 26 May 1979 (age 47); Kettering, Northamptonshire
- Batting: Right-handed
- Bowling: Right-arm medium

Domestic team information
- Years: Team
- 1999–2001: Leicestershire Cricket Board
- 2003–2006: Bedfordshire

Career statistics
Competition	LA
Matches	5
Runs scored	19
Batting average	6.33
100s/50s	0/0
Top score	14
Balls bowled	288
Wickets	8
Bowling average	29.00
5 wickets in innings	0
10 wickets in match	0
Best bowling	2/33
Catches/stumpings	1/–
- Source: Cricinfo, 17 November 2010

Lee Gordon Pollard (born 26 May 1979) is an English cricketer. Pollard is a right-handed batsman who bowls right-arm medium pace. He was born at Kettering, Northamptonshire.

Pollard made his debut in List A cricket for the Leicestershire Cricket Board against Hertfordshire in the 1999 NatWest Trophy. He represented the Board in 2 further List A matches, which came against the Durham Cricket Board in the 2000 NatWest Trophy and the Northamptonshire Cricket Board in the 1st round of the 2002 Cheltenham & Gloucester Trophy which was played in 2001.

In 2003, Pollard made his debut in the Minor Counties Championship for Bedfordshire against Cumberland. From 2003 to 2006, he represented the county in 13 Championship matches, the last of which came against Norfolk. Pollard played for the county in 2 MCCA Knockout Trophy matches against Suffolk in 2003 and Herefordshire in 2005.

He also made 2 List A appearances for Bedfordshire. These came against Warwickshire in the 2003 Cheltenham & Gloucester Trophy and Cheshire in the 1st round of the 2004 Cheltenham & Gloucester Trophy which was played in 2003. In his career total of 5 List A matches, he scored 19 runs at a batting average of 6.33, with a high score of 14. In the field he took a single catch, while with the ball he took 8 wickets at a bowling average of 29.00, with best figures of 2/33.
