= Harald Naegeli =

Swiss artist

Sprayer of Zurich Harald Naegeli
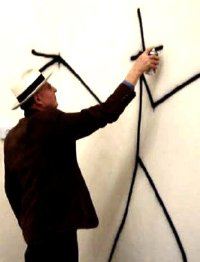
- Harald Naegeli painting in Vienna’s MuseumsQuartier, (2006)
- Born: Harald Oskar Naegeli; 1939 (age 86–87); Zurich
- Education: Zurich University of the Arts
- Known for: Graffiti
- Parents: Hans Naegeli-Osjord (father); Ragenhild Naegeli-Osjord (mother)

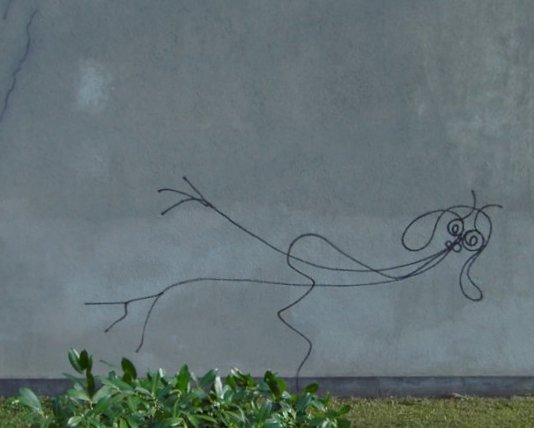
Undine (1978)

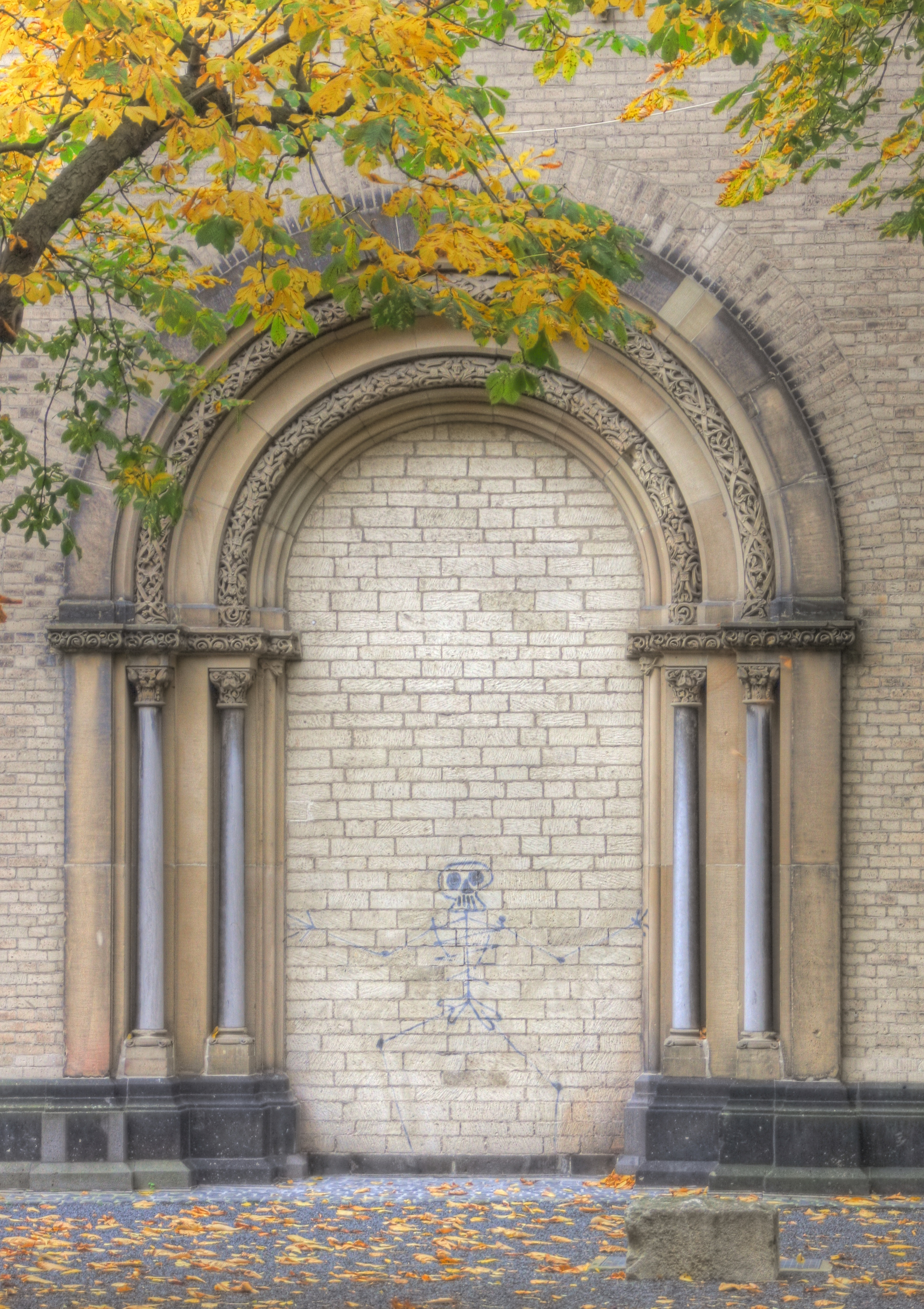
Memento mori, western facade of St. Cäcilien, Cologne.

Harald Naegeli (born 4 December 1939) is a Swiss artist best known as the "Sprayer of Zurich" after the graffiti he sprayed in the late 1970s onto walls and buildings in Zürich, Switzerland.

== The “Sprayer of Zurich” ==
Naegeli has had a classic education as an artist, having studied at the Kunstgewerbeschule of Zürich and at the École des Beaux-Arts in Paris. Naegeli's graffiti appeared beginning in September 1977 on the walls of Zürich. He used black spray-paint to paint wireframe figures on the walls of public and private buildings alike. He painted his graffiti anonymously at night, in places all over the city. The figures provoked a heated controversy in Zürich and indeed in Switzerland in general. Intellectuals and artists recognized the artistic value of Naegeli's works early on, but the general public and the Swiss authorities saw it only as an illegal and malicious defacement of property. Naegeli himself later said that he saw himself as a political artist and his graffiti were a political statement against the increasing anonymity in the city. The authorities issued an arrest warrant for him, but he was apprehended only in June 1979 when he returned to one of his paintings to collect his glasses that he had forgotten there. Until then, he had painted some 900 graffiti in Zürich. He evaded the trial by fleeing to Germany to his confidant, journalist and author Hubert Maessen, yet was sentenced in absentia to nine months in jail and a fine of CHF 206,000. His lawyers appealed, but the Supreme Court of Switzerland confirmed the sentence in November 1981. Since Naegeli had left the country, the authorities of Zürich issued an international arrest warrant for him. 72 Swiss artists signed a petition demanding that this arrest warrant be retracted, to no avail.

In Germany, his work was more appreciated as art, and Naegeli remained there for the next few years and became acquainted with Joseph Beuys, who was a neighbor of Maessen in the city of Düsseldorf. Naegeli continued to spray his characteristic wireframe graffiti in Cologne and Düsseldorf, and although they were not unanimously welcomed there either they caused much less discussion than they had in Zürich. In Cologne, he produced in 1980/81 a cycle of about 600 graffiti that became known as the Kölner Totentanz; most of these works were removed already the day after their creation by the city cleaning department. The mayor of Osnabrück even invited Naegeli to spray in his city, but Naegeli declined the offer. Adolf Muschg, an eminent Swiss writer and later professor for literature at the ETH in Zürich and one of the 72 artists who had signed the petition, commented later: "He doesn't work on commission. He does not sell out his rage". On 27 August 1983 Naegeli was arrested at Puttgarden on Fehmarn when he tried to cross over to Denmark, but was released again on bail. Germany was reluctant to grant the Swiss the extradition, but finally agreed to evict Naegeli. On 29 April 1984 Naegeli turned himself in to the Swiss police at the border crossing in Lörrach and subsequently served his jail sentence. Once released, he returned to Düsseldorf in Germany.

== In Germany ==
Naegeli largely disappeared from the attention of the public in the late 1980s. He began focussing on drawings on paper and etchings. He calls his new works Partikelzeichnungen; they are composed of thousands of minuscule dots and small lines. This slow process is in stark contrast to his earlier graffiti that, by their very nature, were a very spontaneous means of expression.

Naegeli became a well-respected artist in Germany. In 1997, he produced a graffito for the University of Tübingen, and in 1998, he was called as a professor at the Thomas-Morus-Academy in Cologne. He has donated his Partikelzeichnungen to the Institute of Art History at the University of Tübingen.

== Rehabilitation ==
Even the authorities of Zürich at long last recognized Naegeli's graffiti as art. The city restored one of the very few of his surviving graffiti in Zürich: Undine was created in 1978 on a building of the University of Zürich, located at Schönberggasse 9 (47°22′23.4″N 8°32′56.5″E). When the building was renovated from 1995 to 2004, the graffito was considered "valuable art" by the building department and covered to protect it for the duration of the work. In October 2004, Undine was restored and other graffiti added later were removed.
