= Salvatore Vitale (artist) =

Italian artist (born 1986)

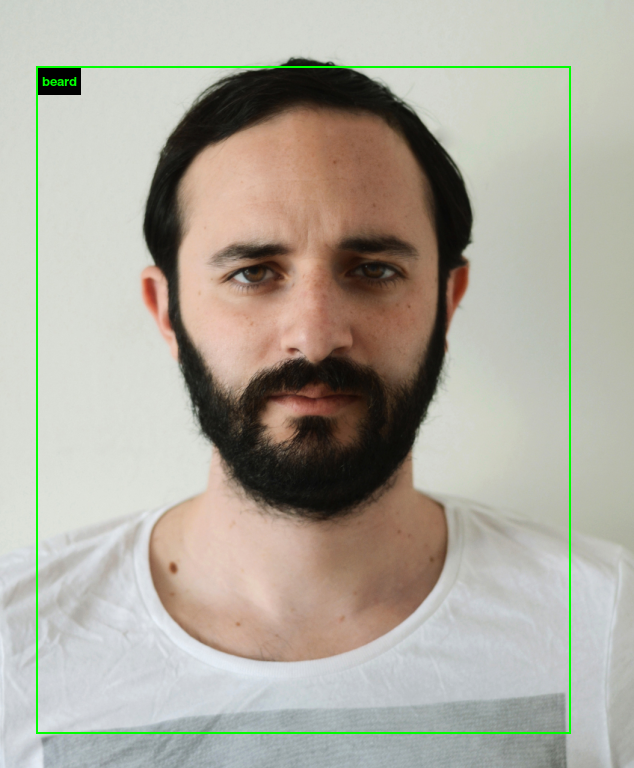
- Born: Palermo, Italy
- Education: Lucerne University of Applied Sciences and Arts
- Known for: Visual artist, educator, and editor
- Notable work: How to Secure a Country
- Website: www.salvatore-vitale.com

Salvatore Vitale (born 1986) is an Italian visual artist, educator, and editor based in Switzerland. Vitale is the co-founder and Editor-in-Chief of YET magazine and the author of "How to Secure a Country".

Vitale is a lecturer at Lucerne University of Applied Sciences and Arts, where he leads the Transmedia Storytelling program at Camera Arts.

== Early life and education ==
Vitale was born in 1986 and raised in Palermo, Italy. In 2005, at the age of 18, Vitale left Sicily to study in Lugano, in the southern Swiss canton of Ticino. He studied fine arts at the Zurich University of the Arts.

== Early career ==
After his studies, Vitale began publishing YET magazine, a Swiss-based international photography magazine devoted to contemporary photography. Since 2012, YET magazine has developed into a platform for debate for a community of photographers and photography scholars.

== Projects ==
=== How to Secure a Country ===
In 2014, he started working on his visual research project called "How to Secure a Country", after Switzerland voted against mass immigration. While working on his project, Vitale began to collaborate with security researchers from the Swiss Federal Institute of Technology in Zurich for four years.

According to Vitale during his interview with Vogue Italia, "The aim of the project was to show the Swiss security system from within by accessing the whole apparatus to almost become part of it without, at the same time, adopting an investigative approach or a judgmental outlook." The project has been awarded various accolades, including the 2017 Phmuseum Grant, and was presented its complete version as part of a solo exhibition opening at The Swiss Center for Photography Winterthur in Switzerland in 2019.

Vitale was featured "FOAM Talent" by FOAM (Fotografiemuseum Amsterdam) and his project "How to Secure a Country" was listed as one of the Favorite Photobooks of 2019 by LensCulture. A wide selection of "How to Secure a Country" is in the collection of Fotostiftung Schweiz in Winterthur.

=== How to Secure a Country + ===
In 2021, Vitale's "How to Secure a Country +" had its first solo exhibition presented in an Italian institution and was hosted by CAMERA. It was part of the series of exhibitions "Passengers. Tales from the New World", a program dedicated by CAMERA to mid-career artists who most represent examples of innovation in contemporary visual language. Curated by Giangavino Pazzola, the exhibition consists of more than forty works belonging to two groups of works, related to research carried out by Vitale since 2014.

=== Persuasive System ===
"Persuasive System" is an interactive installation focused on the use of CCTV in public spaces.

=== Decompressed Prism ===
Decompressed Prism is a video installation that combines of fictional and documentary elements, video archives, text, sound design and real data that create an uncertain and mischievous space. Decompressed Prism was exhibited as a digital installation commissioned by the Musée des beaux arts Le Locle.

=== Death by GPS ===
Vitale's "Death by GPS" is a multi-part project that deals with the day laborers and mining in the Gauteng region of South Africa. The project explores issues such as labor exploitation, the gig economy, and automated processes in the context of post-capitalism.

== Publications ==
=== Publications paired with others ===
- Vitale, Salvatore. 2019. How To Secure A Country: From Border Policing via Weather Forecast to Social Engineering—A Visual Study of 21st-Century Statehood. With texts by Lars Willumeit, Roland Bleiker, Philip Di Salvo. Lars Müller, Zürich: Lars Müller Publishers. ISBN 9783037785973

=== Publications with contributions by Vitale ===
- On the Verge. Void. 2023. ISBN 9786188331891
- MAST Photography Grant on Industry and Work 2023. Corraini Edizioni. 2023. ISBN 9788894369861
- Art for Zurich. Scheidegger & Spiess. 2022. ISBN 9783039421039
- From Where I Stand: Biennale für Aktuelle Fotografie. 2022. ISBN 9789083165899. Edited by Iris Sikking and design by Leonie Rapp
- Shoot & Think, Studio Image. Bozen University. 2022
- Seven Questions. Ruby Press. 2022. ISBN 9783944074443. Edited by Jan De Vylder, Annamaria Prandi / ETH Studio Jan De Vylder
- HYBRIDS: Forging New Realities as Counter Narrative. Amsterdam, Netherlands: Ed. Futures Photography. 2021. ISBN 9789090355993. Edited by Salvatore Vitale and Saba Askary
- SLANTED #37: Artificial Intelligence. Slanted Publishers. 2021
- Nummer #10: Post-Photography. Lucerne University of Art and Design. 2021. ISBN 9783033084919. Edited by Wolfgang Brückle and Salvatore Vitale
- Challenging Black Box Technology Power Imbalances by Exposing Them: "Persuasive System" as a Prism for Decomposing Contemporary Surveillance. Surveillance & Society. Vol. 19 No. 4 (2021): Imagining Surveillance Future
- Bally Foundation Collection. Bally Foundation. 2021. ISBN 9783039421039
- Ideologies / Ideologien. kehrerverlag.com. 2021. ISBN 9783969000434
- RESET: Questioning the Image, the Market, and the Role of Representation. Futures Photography. 2021. ISBN 9789090341101. Edited by Salvatore Vitale
- Art & Energy. SternbergPress. 2020. ISBN 9783956795763
- Non-Gasoline Stations. Artphilein Editions. 2020. ISBN 9788894518610
- T*. Mousse Publishing. 2019. ISBN 9788867493968. Edited by Ilaria Bombelli
- The Moon was Broken. Photopaper.
- 1000 Words, 10 Years. 1000 Words Magazine. 2018
- Picturing Cyberspace. Unseen Magazine. 2017. ISBN 978-90-822642-2-7

== Awards ==
- First prize, Photographic Museum of Humanity 2017 grant, Buenos Aires, Argentina.
- Won the Swiss Design Award for YET magazine in 2018
- Won FOAM Talent and the Punctum award in 2018
- Received Swiss Art Council Pro Helvetia Grant for Visual Arts in 2020
- Won the Bally Artist of the Year 2020 for How to Secure a Country, Bally Foundation
- Won the Swiss Design Award for Death by GPS in 2020
- Finalist of MAST Photography Grant on Industry and Work in 2023
- Received the Pro Helvetia Johannesburg Residency Grant in 2023
