= Craig Macconacie =

English cricketer

Personal information
- Full name: Craig Macconacie
- Born: 10 November 1977 (age 49); Leicester, Leicestershire, England
- Batting: Right-handed
- Bowling: Right-arm medium-fast

Domestic team information
- Years: Team
- 2002: Leicestershire Cricket Board

Career statistics
Competition	LA
Matches	2
Runs scored	49
Batting average	49.00
100s/50s	–/–
Top score	25
Balls bowled	48
Wickets	–
Bowling average	–
5 wickets in innings	–
10 wickets in match	–
Best bowling	–
Catches/stumpings	–/–
- Source: Cricinfo, 15 November 2010

Craig Macconacie (born 10 November 1977) is a former English cricketer. Macconacie was a right-handed batsman who bowled right-arm medium-fast. He was born in Leicester, Leicestershire.

Macconacie represented the Leicestershire Cricket Board in 2 List A matches against Denmark in the 1st round of the 2003 Cheltenham & Gloucester Trophy, and the Kent Cricket Board in the 2nd round of the same competition. Both matches were held in 2002. In his 2 List A matches, he scored 49 runs at a batting average of 49, with a high score of 25, with one not out innings.
