= Oliver Williams (cricketer) =

English cricketer (born 1983)

Personal information
- Full name: Oliver Charles W Williams
- Born: 28 April 1983 (age 43); Northampton, Northamptonshire, England
- Batting: Right-handed

Domestic team information
- Years: Team
- 2002: Leicestershire Cricket Board

Career statistics
Competition	LA
Matches	2
Runs scored	7
Batting average	3.50
100s/50s	–/–
Top score	4
Balls bowled	–
Wickets	–
Bowling average	–
5 wickets in innings	–
10 wickets in match	–
Best bowling	–
Catches/stumpings	–/–
- Source: Cricinfo, 15 November 2010

Oliver Charles W Williams (born 28 April 1983) is an English cricketer. Williams is a right-handed batsman. He was born in Northampton, Northamptonshire.

Williams represented the Leicestershire Cricket Board in 2 List A matches against Denmark in the 1st round of the 2003 Cheltenham & Gloucester Trophy, and the Kent Cricket Board in the 2nd round of the same competition. Both matches were held in 2002. In his 2 List A matches, he scored 7 runs at a batting average of 3.50, with a high score of 4.

He later played club cricket for Hayes Cricket Club in the Kent Cricket League.

In 2016 Oli joined Thames Ditton cricket club and whilst appearances were limited, he scored 938 runs across 5 seasons, averaging 33.50. He was a key member of the 2018 league winning side, as well as the 2019 promotion winning side. His highest score was 111* away to Claygate.
