= Nemesh Patel =

English cricketer (born 1976)

Personal information
- Full name: Nemesh Girishchandra Patel
- Born: 8 October 1976 (age 50); Leicester, Leicestershire, England
- Batting: Right-handed
- Bowling: Right-arm off break

Domestic team information
- Years: Team
- 1999–2002: Leicestershire Cricket Board

Career statistics
Competition	LA
Matches	7
Runs scored	139
Batting average	23.16
100s/50s	–/1
Top score	62*
Balls bowled	234
Wickets	4
Bowling average	48.50
5 wickets in innings	–
10 wickets in match	–
Best bowling	2/30
Catches/stumpings	–/–
- Source: Cricinfo, 17 November 2010

Nemesh Girishchandra Patel (born 8 October 1976) is an English cricketer. Patel is a right-handed batsman who bowls right-arm off break. He was born in Leicester, Leicestershire.

Patel represented the Leicestershire Cricket Board in List A cricket. His debut List A match came against Hertfordshire in the 1999 NatWest Trophy. From 1999 to 2002, he represented the Board in 7 List A matches, the last of which came against the Kent Cricket Board in the 2nd round of the 2003 Cheltenham & Gloucester Trophy which was played in 2002. In his 7 List A matches, he scored 139 runs at a batting average of 23.16, with a single half century high score of 62*. With the ball he took 4 wickets at a bowling average of 48.59, with best figures of 2/30.

He currently plays club cricket for Loughborough Town Cricket Club in the Leicestershire Premier Cricket League.
