= Karl Smith (cricketer) =

English cricketer (born 1978)

Personal information
- Full name: Karl Brian Smith
- Born: 23 September 1978 (age 48); Leicester, Leicestershire, England
- Batting: Right-handed
- Bowling: Right-arm medium

Domestic team information
- Years: Team
- 2001: Leicestershire Cricket Board

Career statistics
Competition	LA
Matches	1
Runs scored	8
Batting average	8.00
100s/50s	–/–
Top score	8
Balls bowled	–
Wickets	–
Bowling average	–
5 wickets in innings	–
10 wickets in match	–
Best bowling	–
Catches/stumpings	–/–
- Source: Cricinfo, 16 November 2010

Karl Brian Smith (born 23 September 1978) is a former English cricketer. Smith was a right-handed batsman who bowled right-arm medium pace. He was born at Leicester, Leicestershire.

Smith represented the Leicestershire Cricket Board in a single List A match against the Warwickshire Cricket Board in the 2001 Cheltenham & Gloucester Trophy. In his only List A match he scored 8 runs.
