= Carl Herbert Smith =

American computer scientist (1950–2004)

- Born: 1950
- Died: 2004 (aged 53–54)
- Scientific career
- Fields: Computer science
- Workplaces: National Science Foundation; Purdue University; University of Maryland, College Park

Carl Herbert Smith (1950–2004) was an American computer scientist. He was a pioneer in computational complexity theory and computational learning theory.

Smith was program manager of the National Science Foundation's theoretical computer science program, and editor of the International Journal of the Foundations of Computer Science, Theoretical Computer Science, and Fundamenta Informaticae. He held professorships at Purdue University and the University of Maryland, College Park. He organized the first conferences on computational learning in the U.S. in the 1980s. He earned a PhD from the State University at Buffalo in 1979, and received Habilitation degree from the University of Latvia in 1993. He was a member of the Latvian Academy of Sciences.

He was the author of the popular textbooks Theory of Computation: A Gentle Introduction and A Recursive Introduction to the Theory of Computation.

He died of brain cancer in 2004.
