= Chris Griffin (politician) =

American politician

Member of the North Dakota House of Representatives from the 19th district
- In office 2007 -

Personal details
- Born: August 21, 1980 (age 46)
- Party: North Dakota Democratic-NPL Party
- Education: University of North Dakota
- Profession: attorney

Chris Griffin is a North Dakota Democratic-NPL Party member of the North Dakota House of Representatives, representing the 19th district since 2007.
