= Karl Schmid (artist) =

Swiss visual artist (1914–1998)

Karl Schmid (10 May 1914 – 13 August 1998) was a Swiss artist active from the 1930s to the 1990s. He was a painter, sculptor, engraver, illustrator, graphic designer and teacher.

== Biography ==
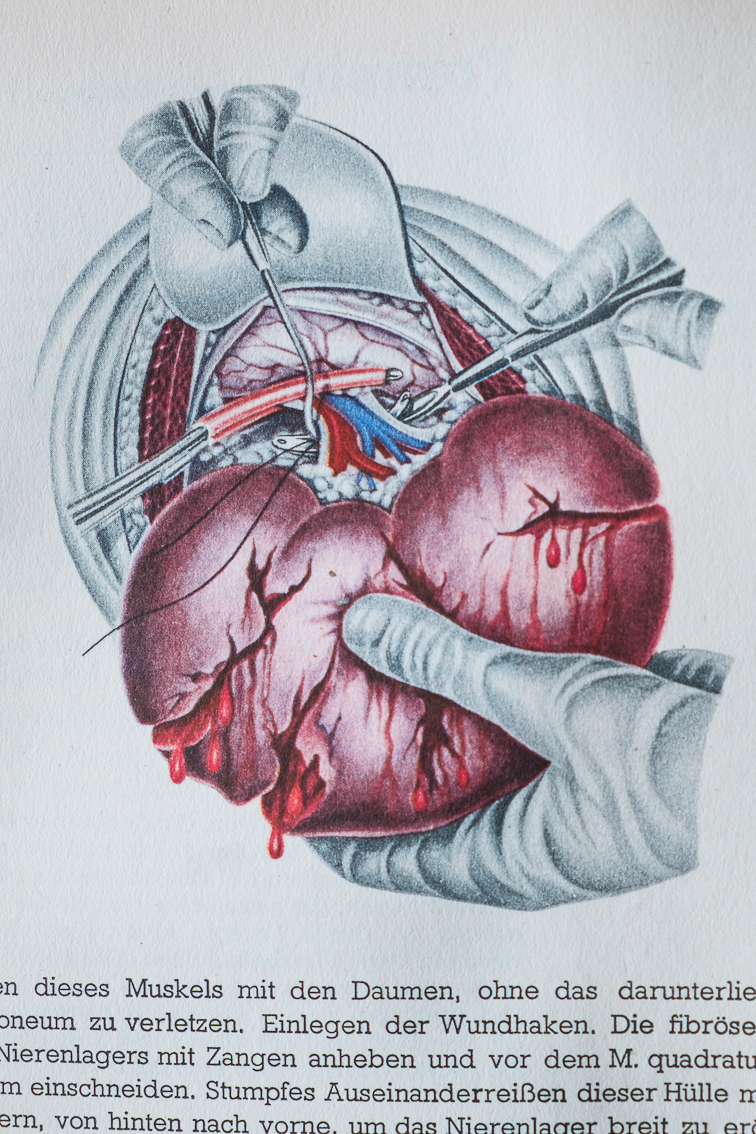
K. Schmid 1940s science illustration. Image source: Aide-mémoire d'interventions urgentes "Siegfried" par le Prof. Charles Perret, Montreux, 1947

Schmid was born in Zürich. His father, of Jewish origin, died in the First World War. His mother, who was left to live in extreme poverty, suffered from epilepsy and schizophrenia; at each of her hospitalizations, Schmid was sent to an orphanage, where he spent his childhood and a good part of his adolescence.

Schmid frequently dreamt of becoming a medical surgeon, but he also demonstrated a passion for woodcarving, which he further explored through an apprenticeship as a cabinetmaker and carpenter. This handicraft training will serve as a foundation for his later work as an artist. Still pursuing a fuller education, he ended up attending an evening high school and some advanced courses at the School of Arts and Crafts. Schmid spent part of his free time in the public library in Zurich, where he reads about everything, with a predilection for literature and, above all, art. During his formative years he met artists such as Oskar Kokoschka and Ernst Ludwig Kirchner. Schmid and Kirchner met in Davos, in a sanatorium for tuberculosis, a disease which, at the time, they both suffered from. "...Their mutual illness, but even more so their common enthusiasm for a new expressive concept of art, brought them closer together, and a deep friendship quickly developed." In 1932, Schmid attended the lectures of Paul Clairmont (professor of surgery at the University of Zurich) as an auditor. Clairmont took notice of the young man focused on drawing during his classes. Upon closer inspection, he recognised Schmid's natural talent for depicting human anatomy, praising his work and subsequently hiring him as a surgical illustrator –the first of his kind– at the University of Zurich. From 1932 to 1941, he makes illustrations for scientific publications.

Around that time, Schmid also married Erika Bilfinger (psychiatrist). From their union, two children were born.

His scientific drawings caught the attention of Walter Gropius, one of the co-founders of the Bauhaus. Gropius invited Schmid to the States, to teach at Harvard's Graduate School of Design. Also through Gropius, Schmid receives a proposal from Disney as an illustrator for an animated film. Yet, despite the once-in-a-lifetime opportunities, Schmid declines these invitations, time and time again, out of family issues. Gropius later introduces Schmid to Johannes Itten, director of the Zurich School of Applied Arts (Zürcher Kunstgewerbeschule, now the Zurich University of the Arts). Itten wanted to hire him as a teacher.

In 1944, Schmid forms one of the first scientific drawing classes, which he continues to teach until 1971.

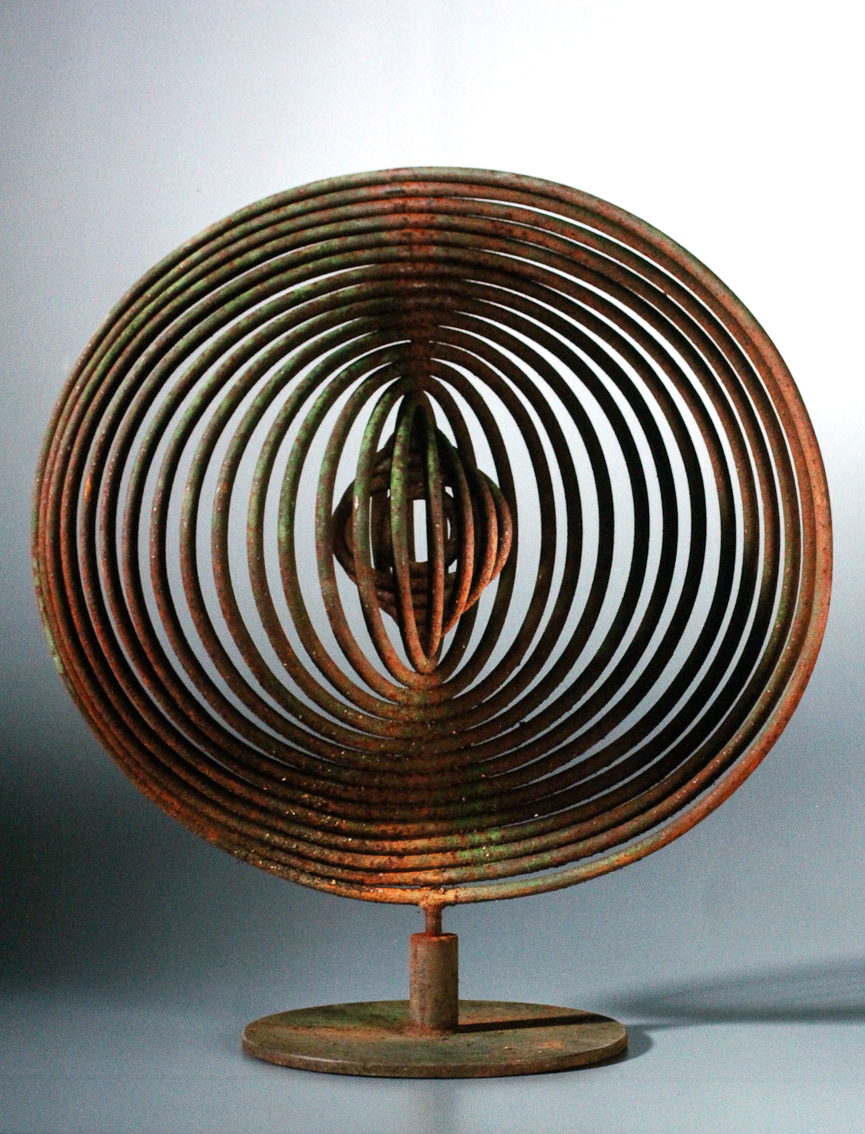
K. Schmid – Untitled (dated: 1970s) – Oxidised iron sculpture, 145 x 45 cm

Schmid moves with his family to the Seefeld district in Zurich. Thanks to his financial security through his job at the school, he can afford his first art studio, at the former stable of Villa Herold, on the Klausstrasse.

In the spring of 1944, Schmid met Hans Arp for the first time in Zurich, at the home of some of his art collector friends. At the time, Arp was grieving due to the loss of his first wife, Sophie Taeuber-Arp, who had died a year earlier in an accident at Max Bill's house, where they were both guests. Later, Max Bill would accompany Arp to Schmid's studio, in an attempt to help his friend overcome his depression through new artistic projects. From then on, a lifelong friendship and collaboration was established between Schmid and Arp. Schmid would then go on to make wooden reliefs, woodcuts and the artist's book Elemente (Elements) for Arp.

In 1956, Schmid was also put in charge of a preparatory course at the School of Applied Arts: the Vorbereitungsklasse.

In 1962, he moved into his studio house in Gockhausen. There, he organized an environment for each type of craft: painting, woodcarving, engraving, and even blacksmithing, where he created most of his iron and bronze pieces of the 1970s and 1880s. His only anthological exhibition took place in 1965, at the Helmhaus, and showcased his works with those of his students: "Karl Schmid und seine Schuler" (Karl Schmid and his students).

From the 1960s onwards, he received many commissions in the field of artistic interventions for architecture. This involves the creation of murals in schools, public and private buildings in the cantons of Zurich, Zug, Grisons and Ticino.

In 1971, at the age of 57, he retired early from teaching: the illness from which he had been suffering for some time worsened, yet he would never stop his artistic pursuits, giving life to a great deal of artwork, including several architectural murals. In his later years, Schmid would become increasingly withdrawn: "and lastly, the long years in which he shied away from all interactions pertaining his friends, in order to fulfil his artistic mission, which led him to a path of isolation."

Schmid died on 13 August 1998, at the Neumünster hospital in Zurich. His resting place is to be found at the Friedhof Üetliberg cemetery.

== Artistic heritage ==
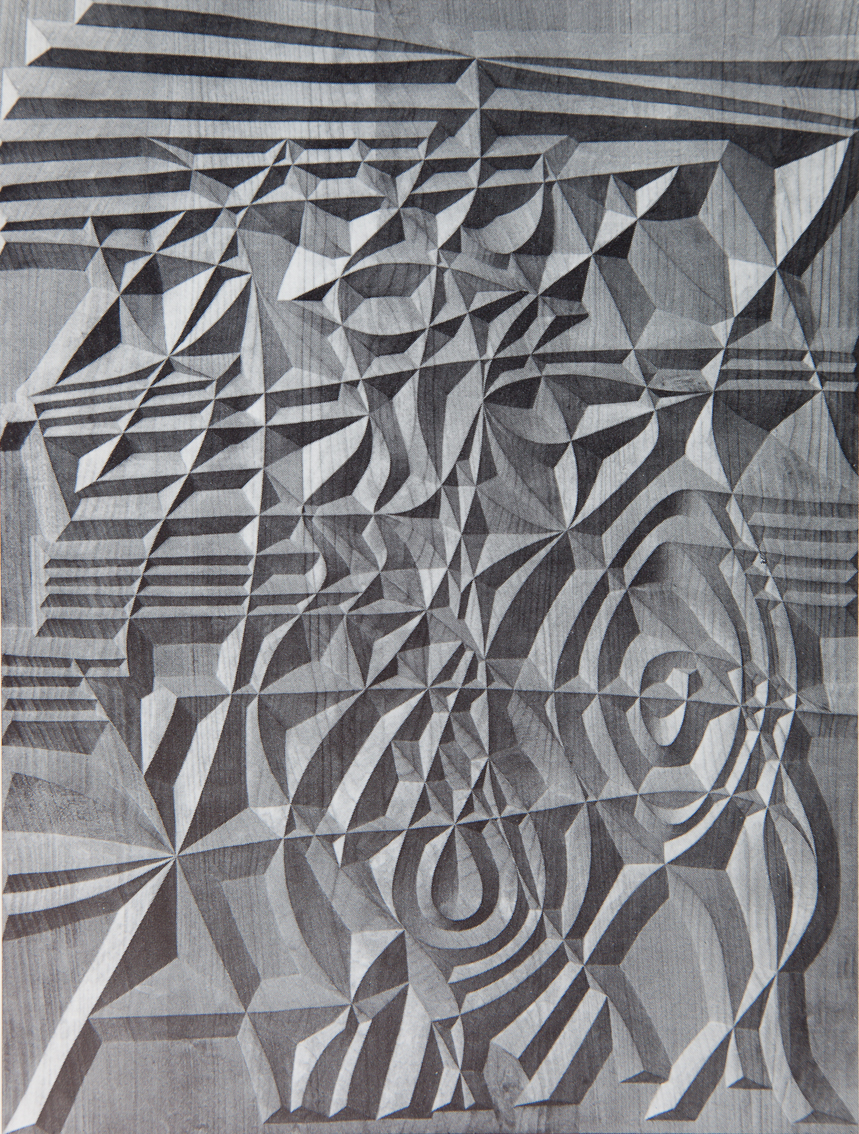
K.Schmid Die LustmÅhle im Kanton Aargau – "The mill of pleasures in the canton of Aargau" (dated: 1960s) – Cherry wood relief.

Karl Schmid's oeuvre consists of drawings, lithographs, woodcuts, fabric prints, oil paintings, watercolours, tapestries, bas-reliefs, wood, stone and iron sculptures, wall paintings and architectural reliefs.

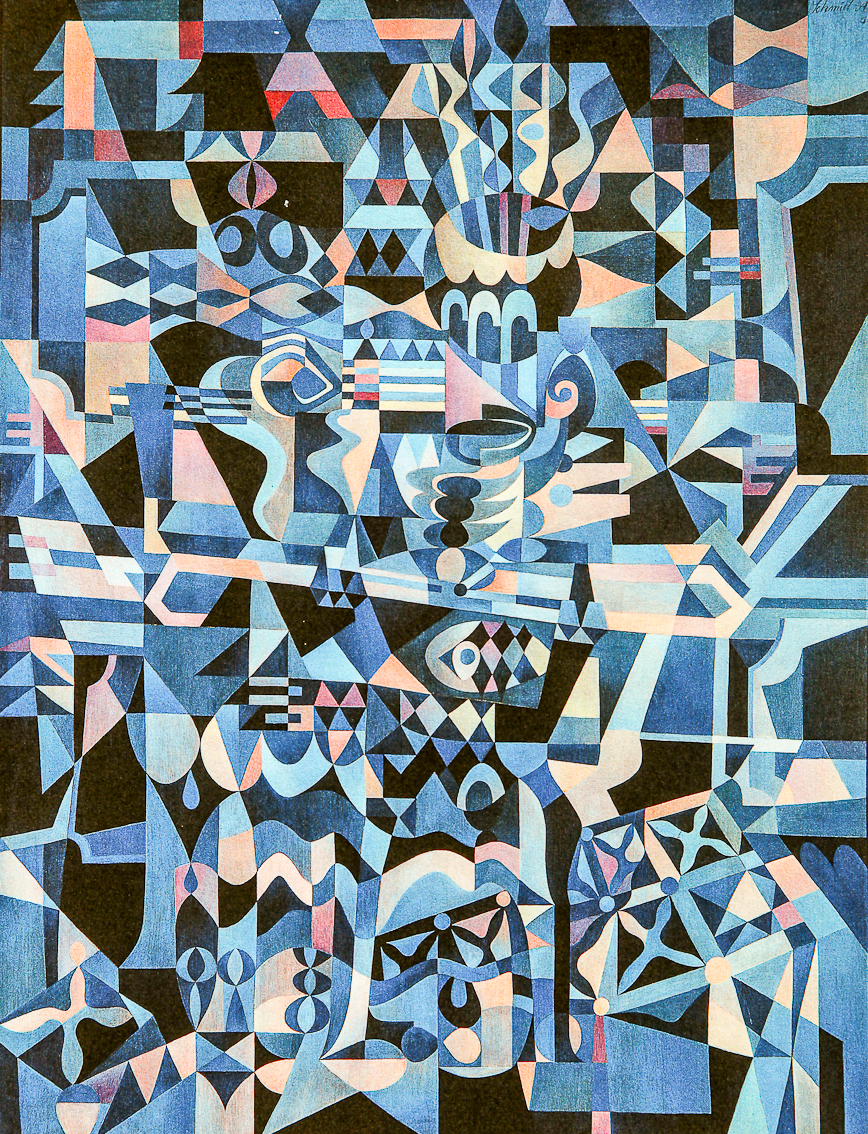
K.Schmid Der geteckte Tisch – "The set table", 1955 – Preparatory painting for tapestry

"Karl Schmid's art ranges from strictly naturalistic work (scientific illustrations) to abstract composition."

"He has mastered the most diverse graphic techniques, his work spanning across a wide range of materials... It is, however, undeniable that drawing was his predilected form of expression".

=== Urban artwork ===
"Karl Schmid was a master at getting in tune with modern architecture".

Around the end of the 1970s, the ETH (Federal Polytechnic of Zurich) wants to give him an honorary degree in architecture, but he refuses. He creates murals in schools, public and private buildings in the cantons of Zurich, Zug, Grisons and Ticino.

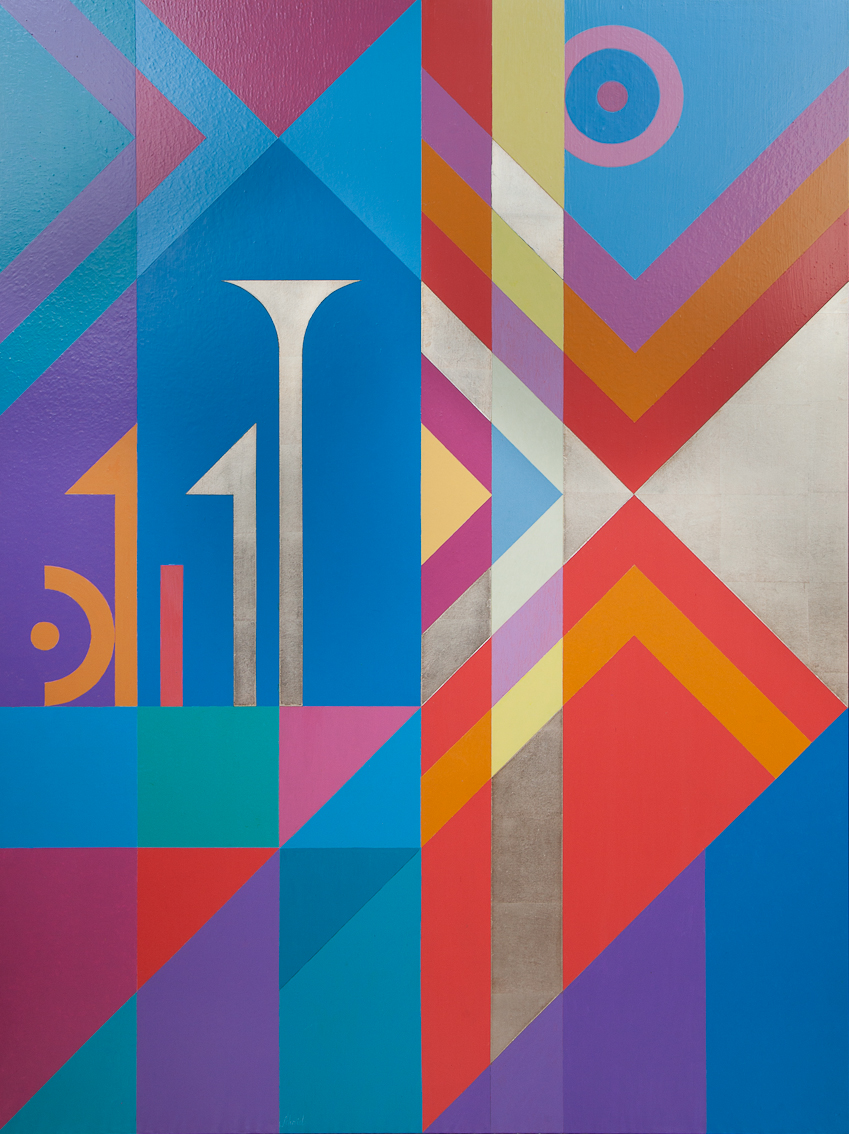
K.Schmid – Untitled (dated: 1980s) – Acrylic wood painting, 120 x 80 cm

Some of his most significant artistic contributions (in Switzerland):

- 1965–66 Preschool "Altbach", Brüttisellen (ZH) – mural painting
- 1965–67 Schulhaus Gutschick, Winterthur (ZH) – 1965, garden of symbols, oak reliefs (atrium-ground floor), 1967 mural painting (external entrance)
- 1966 Elderly home Neubühl ZH-Wollishofen Zurich (ZH) – Dämmerung (Twilight), mural painting (staircase), directional signalling, made of iron (atrium by main entrance), mural painting with zodiac signs, 12 signs of the zodiac, iron mural reliefs (one for each mezzanine per story, 12 stories in total)
- 1967 Research center Agroscope, Zürich (ZH) – frieze in reinforced concrete, 40m above the entrance area (Betonfries)
- 1968 Trü sports centre, Scuol (GR) – Mural painting at indoor swimming pool
- 1970 Public school Rämibühl, Rämistrasse 58, Zurich (ZH) – Mural paintings: cafeteria, cafeteria entrance, garage-corridors, staircase-atrium
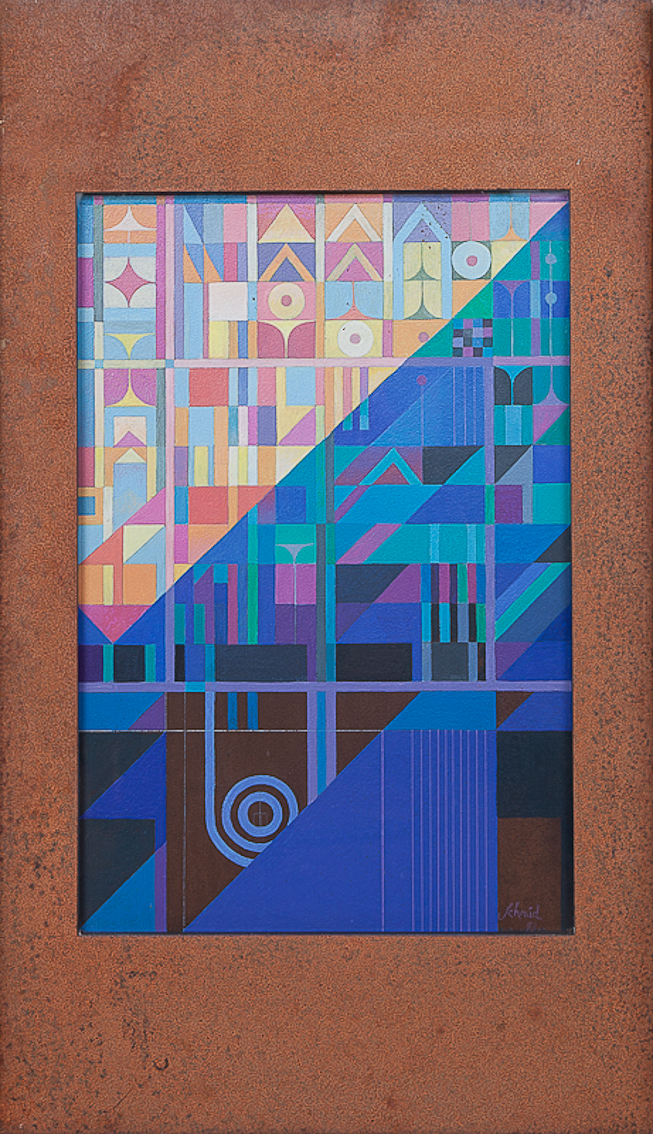
- K. Schmid, Licht und Schatten – "Lights and shadows", 1993 – Watercolour on cardboard with oxidised iron frame 70 x 41 cm
  1974 Cemetery Friedhof Uetliberg – Zürich (ZH) – Pavement mosaic
- 1975 Residential building, Klausstrasse 4, Zurich (ZH) – Abstract scenery – Main entrance lobby and staircase
- 1980 Schmid Home – Lionza (Centovalli – Ticino) – External mural painting

=== Exhibitions ===
Schmid was an independent artist. He did not want to partake in the traditional art market, and would (very often) much rather sell his works directly to collectors he knew personally. His rare exhibitions happened generally due to the initiative of public or private institutions

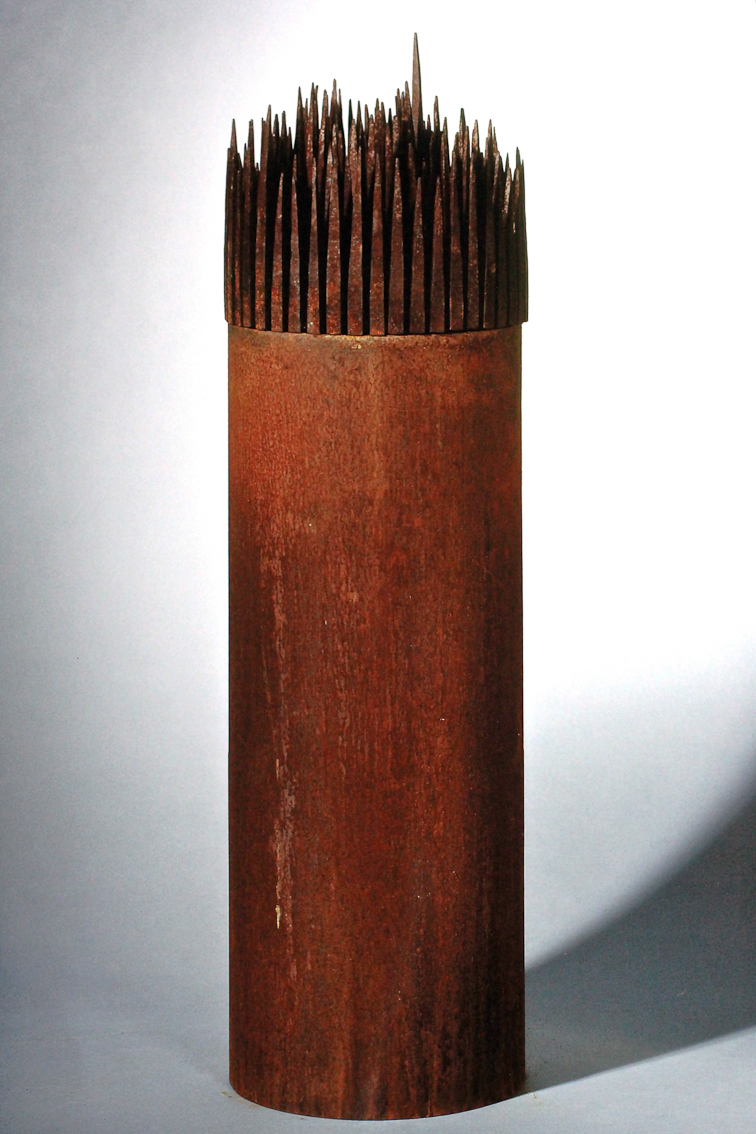
K. Schmid, Auschwitz (dated: 1960s) – Oxidised iron sculpture, 145 x 45 cm

- In 1957, his drawings were exhibited in the group exhibition "Drawing in the work of young Swiss painters and sculptors", Bern, Kunsthalle, 3 August 1957 – 8 September 1957.
- His only retrospective exhibition took place in 1965, together with his students from the School of Applied Arts: "Karl Schmid und seine Schuler" (Karl Schmid and his students) – Helmhaus, Zurich, 23 January 1965 – 28 February 1965. On this occasion, the Kunsthaus Zurich acquired the cherry wood relief Die Lustmühle im Kanton Aargau. The mill of pleasures in the canton of Aargau).
- Solo exhibition, as part of a collective exhibit: "Five Swiss artists" at the SKA in Werdmühleplatz, Zurich, 6 March 1991 – 19 April 1991.
- In 2004, the Ritter-Hürlimann Foundation organised the posthumous exhibition Erinnerungen an Karl Schmid (Memories of Karl Schmid). Uster, Villa Grunholzer, 1 May 2004 – 16 May 2004.

== Teaching career ==
In 1944, Schmid began teaching scientific drawing classes at the Zurich School of Applied Arts, after receiving a formal invitation by director Johannes Itten. In 1956, he was also tasked with the teaching of a preparatory course. "He accepted this responsibility with paternal devotion. (...) His great role models, Rudolf Steiner and Heinrich Pestalozzi, inspired him to treat his students with the utmost respect. He brought many new ideas into teaching, starting from the simplest exercises. However, he demanded that they be carried out with absolute dedication and perfect craftsmanship. He constantly guided his students to make a connection with whatever 'beauty' they dreamed of through sensitivity, perseverance and care."

"Karl Schmid was meant to be a teacher. His students always directly reflected the formal elements, the materials, the inner creative processes he taught. (...) Schmid never solely transmitted a style to his students during his teachings, but rather the vision of a whole world in turmoil".

=== Projects involving his students ===
- 1958 – The booklet Punktgeschichten / "Tales of dots", which came to life as a class project. "With the most basic of instruments – a sharpened nail – his students made engravings on polished pear wood boards. The plates were then sent off for printing at a local print shop. With this ascetically simple design exercise, the students were made aware of the infinite creative richness that can be found in all things, even in the smallest creative element known to mankind, the dot".
- 1962 – Illustrations for a herbarium: "Unkräuter", (Weeds) for the company Ciba-Geigy.

"All the wild plants of Switzerland had to be accurately represented in watercolours. The whole work lasted seven years and in the end included about 180 watercolour plates drawn with extreme precision".In the same timeframe, he also organised a didactic design experience with students, involving the making of a table set of wooden cutlery.

- 1965 – Graphical re-issue of the "Historia Plantarum" by Conrad Gessner.
- 1965 – Schmid gets an invitation from the Kunsthaus Zurich to exhibit his art pieces at the Helmhaus.

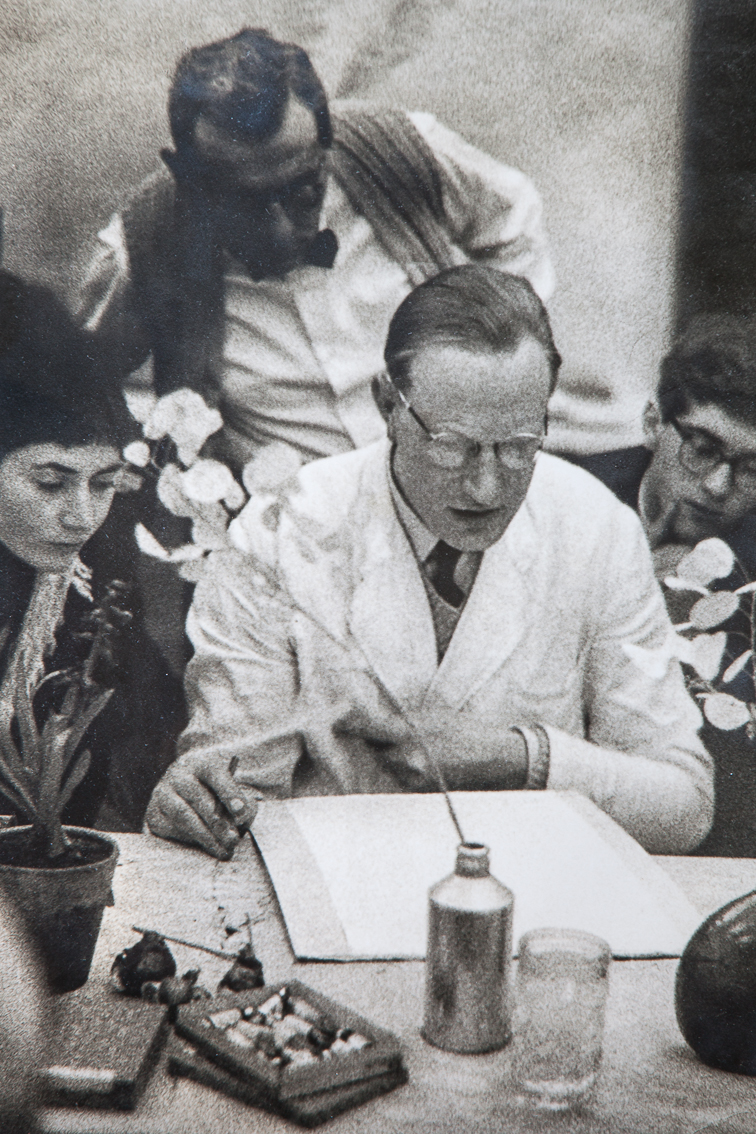
K. Schmid and his students from the Kunstgewerbeschule – Replica of a vintage photo (from the 1960s)

"He gladly accepted the invitation and proposed to also showcase the works of his students from the preliminary course and scientific illustration class. He felt that his educational contribution was an essential part of his creative work".

Max Bill, who was commissioned to make a reform proposal for the School of Arts and Crafts, stated in his final observations that the institute should be closed because of its outdated teaching methods. He only considers the teaching of a few courses to be innovative, among which he mentions Schmid's.

=== Students ===
- Oliviero Toscani, commercial and fashion photographer, writer, politician, communicator, creator of corporate image and advertising campaigns for Benetton, Chanel, Esprit, Fiorucci. He attended the Zürcher Kunstgewerbeschule from 1961 to 1965. Toscani remembers that it was indeed Schmid, who pushed him to pursue photography: back in the day, Toscani wanted to be a painter. Schmid took him to the Zurich Zoo to draw animals (this was one of Schmid's usual teaching methods) and after reviewing his drawings, he kindly suggested he look into photography instead.
- Harald Naegeli, was his student from 1957 to 1962. Better known as the "Sprayer of Zurich", he was a precursor to street-art, during the late 1970s.
- Hans Ruedi Giger, from 1959 to 1960. Painter, designer, illustrator and sculptor. Worked in CGI/special effects industry; was behind the creation/ideation, along with Carlo Rambaldi, of the main creature featured in the movie Alien. Was given an Oscar in 1980 for best cinematic special effects.
- Kurt Laurenz Metzler, from 1958 to 1963. Sculptor.
- Hardy Hepp, from 1962 to 1966. Painter, designer and musician.
- Fredi M. Murer, from 1960 to 1964. Producer, screenplay writer, narrator, photographer and designer.
- Ernst Ghenzi, 1951–54. Sculptor
- Leo Paul Erhardt, 1966–68. Sculptor and photographer (worked with Toscani).

== Bibliography ==
- Adrian Frutiger – Typefaces: The Complete Works* Das Werk: Architektur und Kunst Nr 43 (1956) Zeichnen im Zoo
- Article di Urs P. Eigenmann, Karl Scmid- Versuch eines Portraits / " Karl Schmid-attempt at a portrait", published on the Gockhuser magazine n.3, May–June edit.,1988.
- NZZ Article written by P. Werder for the 70th birthday of Karl Schmid, (10.05.1984) – also cited by Urs P. Eigenmann, Karl Schmid – Versuch eines Portraits (Karl Schmid – attempt at a portrait), published on the Gockhuser magazine n.3, May–June edit.,1988.
- Article published on "Der Silthaler", dated 16 July 1976 – Archive ZHdK.
- Article: Christine Lariol, Interview with Hardy Hepp, Die Lint, 13 January 1993 (Archive ZHdK).
- Catalogue: C.Neuenschwander, Karl Schmid und seine Schüler, Zürcher Kunstgesellschaft,1965.
- Catalogue of K. Schmid's solo exhibition, from 6 March 1991 to 19 April 1991, as part of the exhibition "Five Swiss artists" at the SKA in Werdmühleplatz, Zurich (Archive Foundation K. Schmid).
- Das Werk: Architektur und Kunst Nr. 46 (1959), Sekundarschulhaus in Mollis, Glarus.
- Das Werk: Architektur und Kunst Nr. 46 (1959), Zur farblichen Raumgestaltung im Schulhaus*; Das Werk: Architektur und Kunst Nr. 49 (1962), Design-pädagogische Experimente von Karl Schmid.
- Das Werk Chronik Nr. 3 (1965) Pp. 67–68, Article: H.C., Karl Schmid und seine Schüler (Karl Schmid and his students).
- Das Werk: Architektur und Kunst Nr. 54 (1967), Alterssiedlung Neubühl in Zürich.
- Das Werk: Architektur und Kunst Nr. 55 (1968), Die künstlerischen Beiträge im Schulhaus Gutschick in Winterthur.
- Die Kunst im öffentlichen Raum der Stadt Zürich. 1300 Werke — eine Bestandesaufnahme, Bernadette Fülscher* Schweizer Ingenieur und Architekt Nr 116 (1998) Eduard Neuenschwander, ein Gespräch.
- Karl Schmid – painter and sculptor, 1914–1988. His home in Gockhausen, October 1988" Pictures by Rainer Tuggener – (Archive Foundation K. Schmid).
- Karl Schmid, Zeichen und Wege einer Freundschaft (The signs and life paths of a friendship), text accompanying the woodcut prints from the second edition of Arp's book Elemente / "Elements" of 1949, hand-printed edition. One of 200 copies numbered and signed by Arp.
- Various Authors [...], Versuch eines Lebensbildes / "Attempt at a portrait of life", from Erinnerungen an Karl Schmid, Catalogue of the posthumous exhibition dedicated to Karl Schmid, Uster, February 2004.
- WERK Chronik Nr.3 (1965) WERK Chronik (Zeitschrift), Karl Schmid und seine Schüler.
- Rudolf Brennenstuhl, Design-paedagogische Experimente von Karl Schmid – (Educational design experiments by Karl Schmid) Article published on Werk n.49/1962 Schweizer Ingenieur und Architekt Nr.36, 3 (Sep 1998), Karl Schmid zum Gedenken.
- Schweizerische Bauzeitung Nr. 90 (1972), Der neue Friedhof Uetliberg in Zürich.
- Zeitschrift für Landschaftsarchitektur Nr. 13 (1974), Der neue Friedhof Uetliberg in Zürich.
