= Karla Smith =

American judge (born 1969)

- Born: Karla Natasha Smith; December 19, 1969 (age 56); Los Angeles, California, U.S.
- Education: University of Maryland, College Park; University of Virginia School of Law
- Occupation: Judge
- Known for: First African-American female on Montgomery County District Court

Karla Natasha Smith (born December 19, 1969) is an American judge from Maryland. In 2012, she was the first African-American woman appointed to serve on Maryland's Montgomery County District Court. Since 2015, she has served as an Associate Judge for the Montgomery County Circuit Court.

== Biography ==
Karla Smith was born in Los Angeles, California, on December 19, 1969. She attended the University of Maryland, College Park for her undergraduate studies, earning a B.S. degree in government and politics in 1991. After university, she served two years as a staff assistant for U.S. representative Major R. Owens of New York's 11th Congressional District.

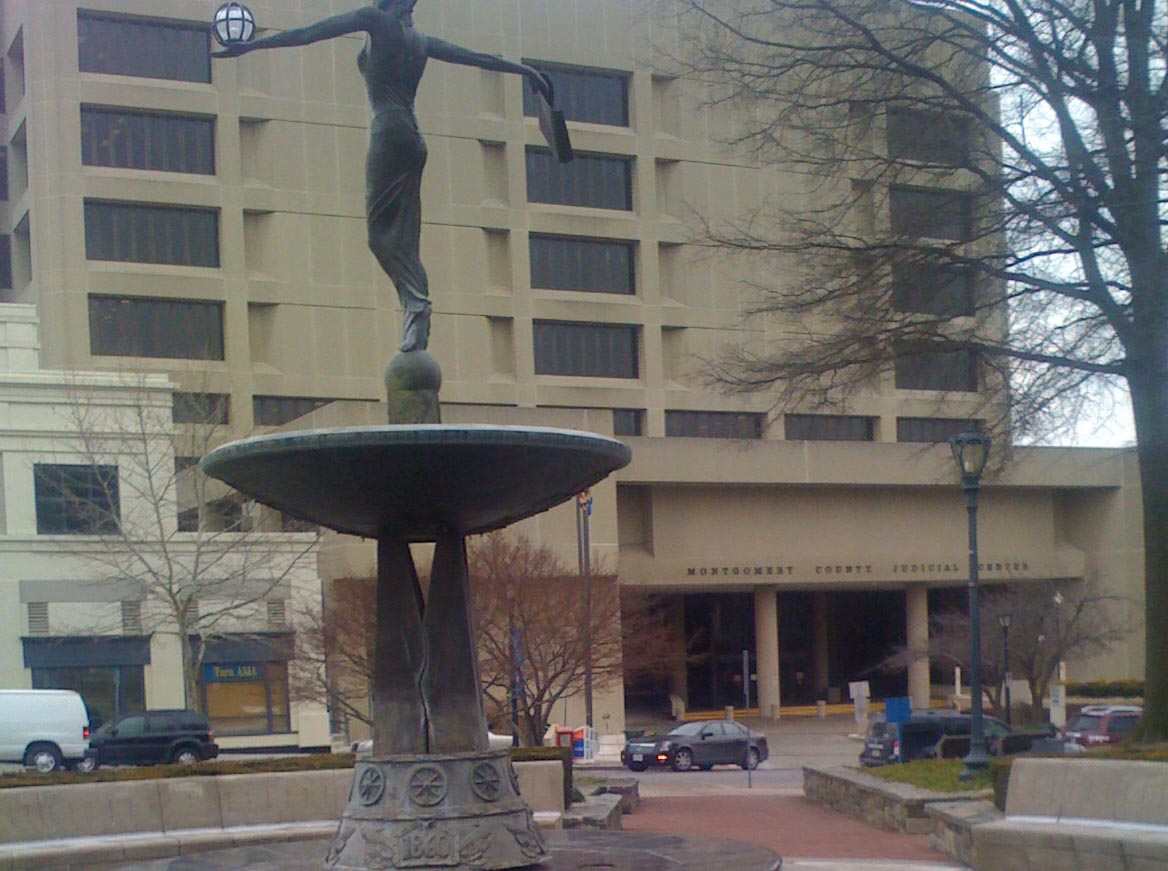
Montgomery County Maryland Judicial Center

In 1995, Smith earned her Juris Doctor (J.D.) from the University of Virginia School of Law. That same year, she was admitted to Maryland Bar. In 1996, she became an assistant state's attorney for Montgomery County.

As a prosecutor, Smith became prominent for her work advocating for women and children. From 2007 to 2012, as a Montgomery County attorney, she served as chief of the family violence division, and from 2009 to 2013 as a member of the Governor's Family Violence Council. In 2009, she was a member on the Children's Justice Act Committee for Maryland's State Council on Child Abuse and Neglect, and from 2010 to 2012, she served on the Sexual Offender Advisory Board. In 2011, Smith was a driver behind a law that would criminalize child neglect in Maryland, punishable up to five years in prison.

In 2012, Governor Martin O’Malley appointed Smith as an Associate Judge for Maryland's District 6, serving Montgomery County. She would become the first black district court judge in Montgomery County history. In 2015, she was Appointed Associate Judge for the Montgomery County Circuit Court.
