= Karl Schmid (television presenter) =

Australian-American television host and HIV activist

- Born: September 16, 1980 (age 46); Geelong, Victoria, Australia
- Citizenship: Australian, American
- Occupations: Television host, presenter, reporter, actor, HIV activist
- Years active: 1994–present
- Organization: Plus Life Media
- Known for: On the Red Carpet, Plus Life, HIV Unwrapped
- Relatives: Kristian Schmid (brother)

Karl Schmid (born September 16, 1980) is an Australian-American television host, presenter, reporter, and HIV activist. He has worked in entertainment television in Australia, the United Kingdom, and the United States, including as a correspondent for ABC's On the Red Carpet.

== Early life ==
Schmid was born in Geelong, Victoria, Australia, and was raised outside Melbourne. He began acting and appearing on television as a child.

== Career ==
Schmid's early television work included the children's drama Mel's Amazing Movies, in which he played Beaven. He later became a regular contributor to the New Zealand children's television program What Now.

After working in television in Australasia and the United Kingdom, including on entertainment programming, Schmid moved to Los Angeles in 2008. In the United States he hosted and contributed to entertainment programs including TV Guide Network specials, and later became known as a correspondent for ABC's On the Red Carpet.

== HIV advocacy and +Life ==
In March 2018, Schmid publicly disclosed that he was HIV positive after sharing his story on social media. In 2020, he wrote in The Advocate that being HIV positive "shouldn't be a news story," while arguing that stigma around HIV remained pervasive.

In 2019, Schmid co-founded Plus Life Media, also known as +Life, with Brent Zacky and Mike Spierer. The media brand focuses on HIV awareness, education, and stigma reduction through original programming and advocacy campaigns.

Schmid has hosted +Life programming including +Talk, and has used the platform to interview medical professionals, advocates, and people living with HIV. He has also appeared in campaigns tied to World AIDS Day and public education about HIV stigma.

In 2025, Schmid hosted and executive produced HIV Unwrapped, a fashion-and-science initiative and Hulu special that paired designers with HIV researchers to explore the history, stigma, and lived experience of HIV through runway presentation and documentary storytelling.
