= Zurich University of the Arts =

Art school in Zürich, Switzerland

Zurich University of the Arts - ZHdK
- Zürcher Hochschule der Künste ZHdK Part of Zürcher Fachhochschule
- Type: Public University
- Established: 2007; 19 years ago 1878; 148 years ago as Kunstgewerbeschule
- President: Karin Mairitsch
- Administrative staff: 1,310
- Students: 2154
- Location: Zurich, Canton of Zurich, Switzerland; 47°22′58″N 8°32′08″E
- Website: zhdk.ch

Zurich University of the Arts (ZHdK, German: Zürcher Hochschule der Künste) is a public university in Zurich, Switzerland. It's the largest arts university in Switzerland with approximately 2,500 students. The university was established in 2007, following the merger between Zurich's School of Art and Design (HGKZ) and the School of Music, Drama, and Dance (HMT). ZHdK is one of four universities affiliated with Zürcher Fachhochschule.

ZHdK offers bachelor's and master's degree courses and further education programmes in art, design, music, art education, theatre, film, dance, and transdisciplinary studies, as well as PhD programmes in collaboration with different international art universities and with ETH Zurich. ZHdK holds an active role in research, especially in artistic research and design research.

Affiliated with ZHdK are the Museum of Design, Zurich, the Theater der Künste (Theatre of the Arts), the Mehrspur Music Club, and the Media and Information Centre (MIZ).

== History ==
Established on 1 August 2007, Zurich University of the Arts (ZHdK) resulted from the merger between the Hochschule für Gestaltung und Kunst Zürich (HGKZ), which had arisen from the Kunstgewerbeschule Zürich (founded in 1878), and the School of Drama, Music, and Dance (HMT). The founding president of the new arts university was professor Hans-Peter Schwarz. Since November 2009, professor Thomas D. Meier has been president of ZHdK.

The Hochschule für Gestaltung und Kunst Zürich (HGKZ) arose from the Kunstgewerbeschule Zürich (founded in 1878). It was located in a building constructed by architects Adolf Steger and Karl Egender, which today also houses the Museum of Design, Zurich.

The School of Music, Drama, and Dance (HMT) was the result of a merger in 1999 between Winterthur and Zurich conservatories of music, Zurich's Jazz School, Zurich's Theatre and Acting Academy, and the Swiss Professional Ballet School. ZHdK's programme in Theatre Studies (affiliated to the Department of Performing Arts and Film) was originally established in 1937, in the context of the Schauspielhaus Zürich (the city's principal theatre), and known as the Bühnenstudio Zürich. It was renamed Schauspiel-Akademie Zürich in the early 1970s.

Following the 2007 school merger, ZHdK occupied 35 sites, spread across the cities of Zurich (Ausstellungsstrasse, Florhof, Mediacampus, Gessnerallee) and Winterthur. In the autumn of 2014, ZHdK relocated to its new campus: the Toni Areal, formerly Europe's largest yogurt factory, in the city's western district (Zurich West). With the exception of its Gessnerallee annex, ZHdK has left all other sites to unite the arts under one roof. The Museum of Design, Zurich and the Bellerive Museum will remain at their current locations.

== Departments ==
=== Music ===
The Department of Music offers programmes in the composition, pedagogy, and interpretation of classical, jazz, pop, and church music. Two BA and four MA degree courses provide professional training for future orchestra and school musicians, orchestra and choir conductors, soloists and chamber musicians, composers and sound engineers, instrumental and voice teachers, jazz and pop musicians. Students take part in performances at the university's own concert halls and on a regular basis also at Zurich's Tonhalle and other public venues.

=== Performing Arts and Film ===
The Department of Performing Arts and Film offers professional training in dance, theatre and film. Theatre training includes BA and MA courses in acting, directing, theatre education, dramaturgy, and stage design. The department also offers BA and MA courses in film. The BA Film provides general training or specialised training in production design. MA students can specialise in directing, documentary filmmaking, screenwriting, cinematography, film editing or creative producing. The dance programmes include professional training in classical dance at Zurich Dance Academy, as well as a BA Contemporary Dance and an MA Dance. The latter enables students to specialise in choreography or in teaching and coaching dance professionals.

=== Design ===
Design students specialise in one of seven professional fields: Cast/Audiovisual Media, Game Design, Industrial Design, Interaction Design, Knowledge Visualization, Trends & Identity, or Visual Communication.

=== Fine Arts ===
The Department of Fine Arts offers degree courses in digitality, photography, installation/sculpture, painting, performance, sound, language, and video/movement.

=== Cultural Analysis ===
The Department of Cultural Analysis provides teaching and research in cultural theory, cultural analysis, and art education. Its BA and MA courses are aimed at future teachers, cultural journalists, and exhibition makers.

== Notable alumni ==
ZHdK and its various precursor institutions (School of Applied Art/HGKZ; Music Conservatory; Theatre Academy) have brought forth a considerable number of acclaimed artists, designers, musicians, and actors:

=== Games ===
- Alice Ruppert

=== Theatre and film ===
- Aya Domenig
- Bruno Ganz
- Mathias Gnädinger
- Talkhon Hamzavi
- Gardi Hutter
- Xavier Koller
- Mathis Künzler
- Sandra Moser
- Markus Imhoof
- Marco Arturo Marelli
- Andrea Staka
- Peter Brogle

=== Photography ===
- Werner Bischof
- René Burri
- René Groebli
- Oliviero Toscani

=== Fine arts ===
- Augusto Giacometti
- Thomas Hirschhorn
- Yves Netzhammer
- Veli Silver
- Salvatore Vitale
- David Weiss
- HR Giger
- Matthias A. K. Zimmermann

=== Design and typography ===
- Walter Käch
- Max Bill
- Adrian Frutiger
- Richard Paul Lohse
- Hans Falk
- Max Miedinger
- Emil Ruder
- Fred Troller

=== Music ===
- Yulianna Avdeeva
- Nik Bärtsch
- Christoph Grab
- Hermann Haller
- Peter Lagger
- Anne-Sophie Mutter
- Andreas Reize
- Othmar Schoeck
- Luzia von Wyl
- Soyoung Yoon
- Nemo Mettler

== Notable faculty ==
Many former graduates have returned to teach at ZHdK. Teaching faculty has included and includes a number of well-known people:

- Sophie Taeuber-Arp, head of the textile class, 1916–1929
- Johannes Itten, director, 1938–1943
- Volkmar Andreae, head of the Tonhalle Orchestra (1906–1949) and the Conservatory of Music (1914–1939)
- Karl Schmid, professor of scientific drawing (1944–71)
- Serge Stauffer co-directed the F+F class for experimental art from 1965 to 1970
- Florian Dombois has been head of the research focus in transdisciplinary studies since autumn 2011
- Irwin Gage ran a class for Lied interpretation
- Ria Ginster, soprano, from 1938 until she had to emigrate
- Isabel Mundry, professor of composition
- Zakhar Bron has been teaching violin and chamber music
- Rudolf Koelman, violin and chamber music professor since 1987(HMT-ZHdK) former concertmaster of the Royal Concertgebouw Orchestra (1996-1999)
- Raphael Wallfisch has been teaching cello and chamber music
- Konstantin Scherbakov is professor of piano
- Giaco Schiesser, professor for media and culture theories, founded the New Media / Media Arts programme (1997) and was Head of the Departement of Art & Media (2002-2017)
- de:Gerhard M. Buurman, professor for interaction design (2000-2016), founded the interaction design programme (2001), the game design programme (2004) and was Head of design research of the Departement of Design.
- Antoine Chessex is a lecturer and researcher in transdisciplinarity and sound studies at the department DKV ("Kulturanalyse und Vermittlung").

== Related facilities ==
The Swiss Design Institute for Finance and Banking (SDFB) was an independent, nonprofit research institute located in Zurich and dedicated to the study of financial-service to client interaction and the fundamental aesthetical principles of security and trust. The institute was affiliated to the Zurich University of the Arts. The SDFB was founded in 2008 by Gerhard M. Buurman, Hans Geiger, Christian Kruse and Lukas Schwitter.
