= Market Harborough Cricket Club =

English club cricket team

Market Harborough Cricket Club is a cricket club founded c.1840 in Market Harborough, Leicestershire, England. The club's first team plays in the Leicestershire Premier Cricket League, which is one of the ECB Premier Leagues that are the highest level of the amateur, recreational sport in England and Wales.

Among the famous players to have appeared for the club are Leicestershire County Cricket Club's first first-class captain Charles de Trafford, C. J. B. Wood and Les Berry.

Market Harborough Cricket Club is located on Fairfield road, Market Harborough. The club's sponsors are The Angel Hotel which is located in Market Harborough and Brook House College cricket academy. The club's president is Les Tobin and the chairman is Micheal Weir.

Harborough have two senior teams, the first team play in the Leicestershire Premier cricket league. The captain is Chris Weir. They enter the Leicestershire County cup, the Everards league cup and the national knockout cup. The Second eleven play in the Leicestershire division one cricket league Market Harborough have three junior teams, an under 15s team, an under 13s team and an under 11s team. The club also have a kwick cricket team which play in the billesdon kwick cricket tournament, the Langtons kwick cricket tournament and the market harborough tournament. The under 13s play in the Great Bowden end of season tournament. The under 15s play in the Leicestershire south league and they enter the district cup. The under thirteens play in the Leicestershire south east division one and they also take part in the district cup.

In 2010, the Market Harborough 1st team won the County Cup against Loughborough Town in the penultimate final at Grace Road. Furthermore, they were crowned champions of the Everards Leicestershire Premier Cricket League the following week, beating Sileby at home in a rain stricken game to become the best team in the league in 2010.

The Market Harborough 2nd team struggled in Division two of the league after be promoted in 2009 from division three. They avoided relegation and survived in the final game of the season thanks to rain, rain that had so hindered the 1st team throughout the season.

Leicestershire's Second XI has played both Minor Counties and Second Eleven Championship matches at the Fairfield Road ground, and it was also used for matches in the ICC Trophy in both 1982 and 1986.
