= Leicestershire and Rutland Cricket League =

English cricket league

Leicestershire & Rutland Cricket League
- Countries: England
- Format: Limited Overs
- First edition: 1997
- Tournament format: League
- Number of teams: 12 (Premier Division)
- Current champion: Kibworth CC
- Most successful: Kibworth CC (14)
- Website: http://www.landrcl.net/

The Everards Leicestershire and Rutland Cricket League (Leicestershire Cricket League until 2014) is the top level of competition for the amateur, recreational game of club cricket in Leicestershire and Rutland, England, and since 2002 has been a designated an ECB Premier League. The League headquarters is based in the Harborough District village of Thorpe Langton, Leicestershire.

In 2018 Uppingham Town became the first team from Rutland to take part in the Premier Division, with Oakham arriving in 2020. However, the 2020 competition was cancelled because of the COVID-19 pandemic. A replacement competition was organised for the later part of the season when cricket again became possible, but with the winners not to be regarded as official league champions.

Cricket Clubs in the Leicestershire & Rutland Cricket League 2021.

== Winners ==
- Year	Champions
  1997	Barrow Town
  1998	Kibworth
  1999	Leicester Ivanhoe
  2000	Kibworth
  2001	Kibworth
  2002	Loughborough Town
  2003	Loughborough Town
  2004	Kibworth
  2005	Loughborough Town
  2006	Kibworth
  2007	Loughborough Town
  2008	Loughborough Town
  2009	Lutterworth
  2010	Market Harborough
  2011	Loughborough Town
  2012	Loughborough Town
  2013	Kibworth
  2014	Loughborough Town
  2015	Kibworth
  2016	Kibworth
- Year	Champions
  2016	Kibworth
  2017	Sileby Town
  2018	Kibworth
  2019	Rothley Park
  2020	League suspended
  2021	Kibworth
  2022	Kibworth
  2023	Kibworth
  2024	Rothley Park
  2025	Rothley Park
  2026	Kibworth

== Performance by season from 2002 ==
Key
Gold	Champions
Red	Relegated
Blue	Left League

Performance by season, from 2002
Club	2002	2003	2004	2005	2006	2007	2008	2009	2010	2011	2012	2013	2014	2015	2016	2017	2018	2019	2020	2021	2022	2023	2024	2025	2026
Ashby Hastings						9	7	6	11		6	12													
Barkby United										11					4	9	9	12							
Barrow Town		7	7	5	11			2	3	12		7	8	4	7	8	3	2		11	6	6	12		9
Barwell	11	10	11																						
Billesdon	10	8	10	12																					
Broomleys		9	9	11							7	10	12												
Cropston																		10		12		7	9	11	
Earl Shilton Town							12					8	11		12										
Egerton Park																									11
Enderby																11									
Hinckley Town	12		12		7	6	6	11					4	6	11										
Houghton & Thurnby																							7	9	6
Illston Abey (Note: Illston Abey were relegated for disciplinary reasons in 2002.)	7		5	8	3	11	5	12																	
Kegworth Town									6	6	8	5	10	11		3	8	9		6	9	12		12	
Kibworth	2	3	1	3	1	4	2	4	4	4	4	1	2	1	1	2	1	6		1	1	1	4	2	1
Langtons					12												10	4		4	3	9	11		
Leicester Banks	6	11		10	6	3	11																		
Leicester Ivanhoe	5	6	2	6	5	5	3	7	9	10	9	3	6	10	8	5	4	7		5	4	8	2	3	3
Loughborough Town	1	1	3	1	2	1	1	3	2	1	1	6	1	5	2	4	5	5		2	5	3	10	5	5
Lutterworth	4	4	8	4	8	7	10	1	10	5	12		5	2	3	10	2	11			11		5	7	8
Market Harborough	3	2	4	2	4	2	4	5	1	2	2	2	7	8	10	6	12								
Narborough and Littlethorpe									12																
Newtown Linford																				8	7	10	6	8	10
Oakham																				7	10	5	8	10	12
Rothley Park														9	9	12		1		9	2	2	1	1	2
Shepshed																								6	7
Sileby Town						12		10	8	3	5	9	3	3	5	1	6	3		3	8	4	3	4	4
Stoughton and Thurnby	9	12		9	10	8	8	8	7	8	10	11													
Syston Town	8	5	6	7	9	10	9	9	5	7	3	4	9	7	6	7	7	8		10		11			
Thorpe Arnold										9	11			12											
Uppingham Town																	11				12				
References																			(Note: Due to the Coronavirus pandemic an ad-hoc interim league was set up during the late summer of 2020.)						
