= Leicestershire Cricket Board =

The Leicestershire & Rutland Cricket Board is the governing body for all recreational cricket in the historic counties of Leicestershire and Rutland.

From 1999 to 2003, the Board fielded a team in the English domestic one-day tournament under the name of the Leicestershire Cricket Board, matches which had List-A status.

== See also ==
- List of Leicestershire Cricket Board List A players
