= Jugendkulturhaus Dynamo =

Youth center in Zürich, Switzerland

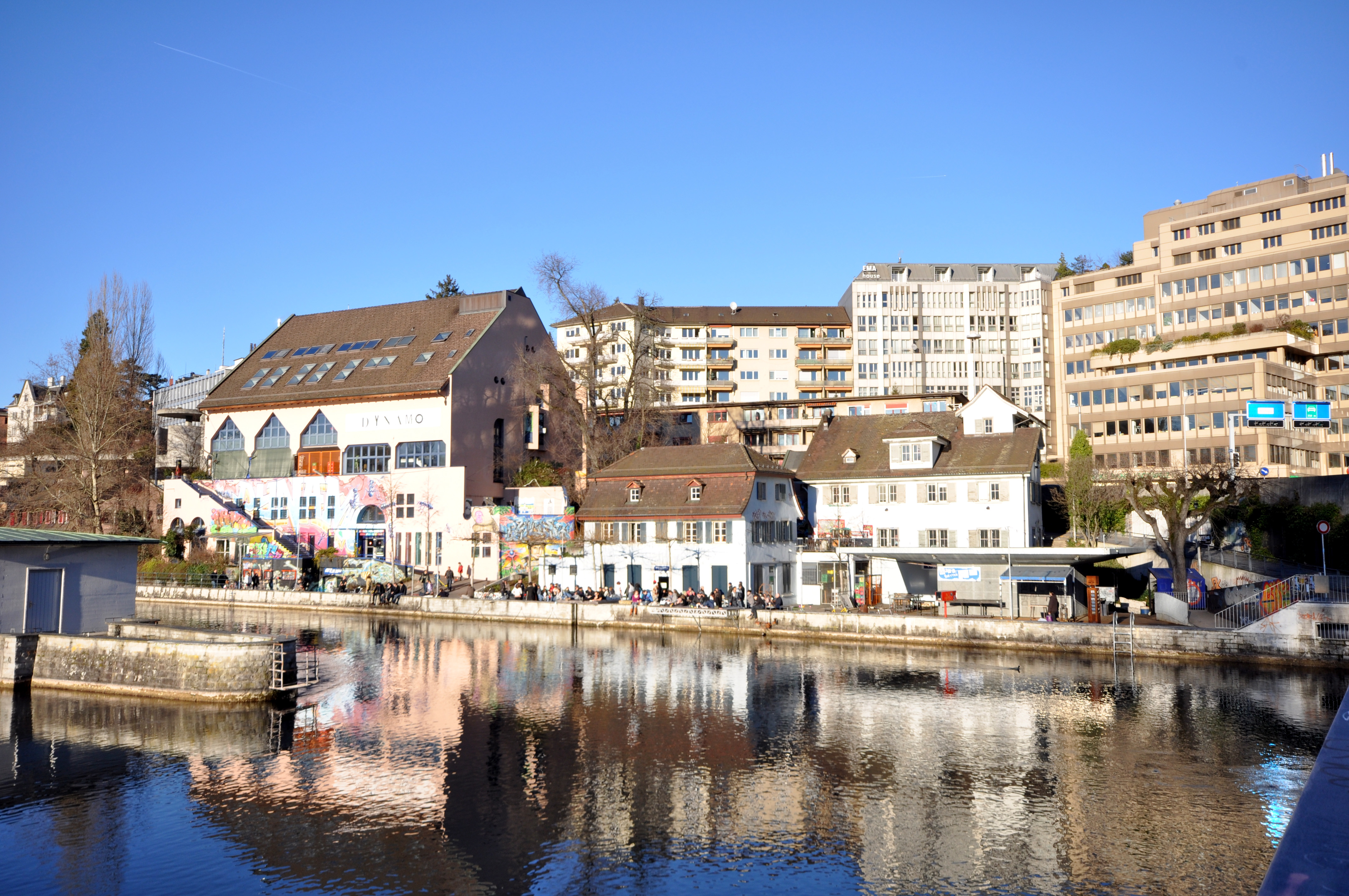
- The Dynamo in 2011
- Interactive map of the Jugendkulturhaus Dynamo area
- Former names: Drahtschmidli
- Alternative names: Dynamo Zürich

General information
- Location: Zürich, Switzerland, Wasserwerkstrasse 21
- Coordinates: 47°22′59″N 8°32′22″E
- Opened: May 1988
- Renovation cost: 15,000,000 Swiss francs
- Owner: City of Zürich

Website
- dynamo.ch

Jugendkulturhaus Dynamo (transl. "Youth Cultural Center Dynamo"), also known as the Drahtschmidli, is a youth center in Zürich, Switzerland. The space hosts workshops, concerts, and plays. It also includes a restaurant and club.

== History ==
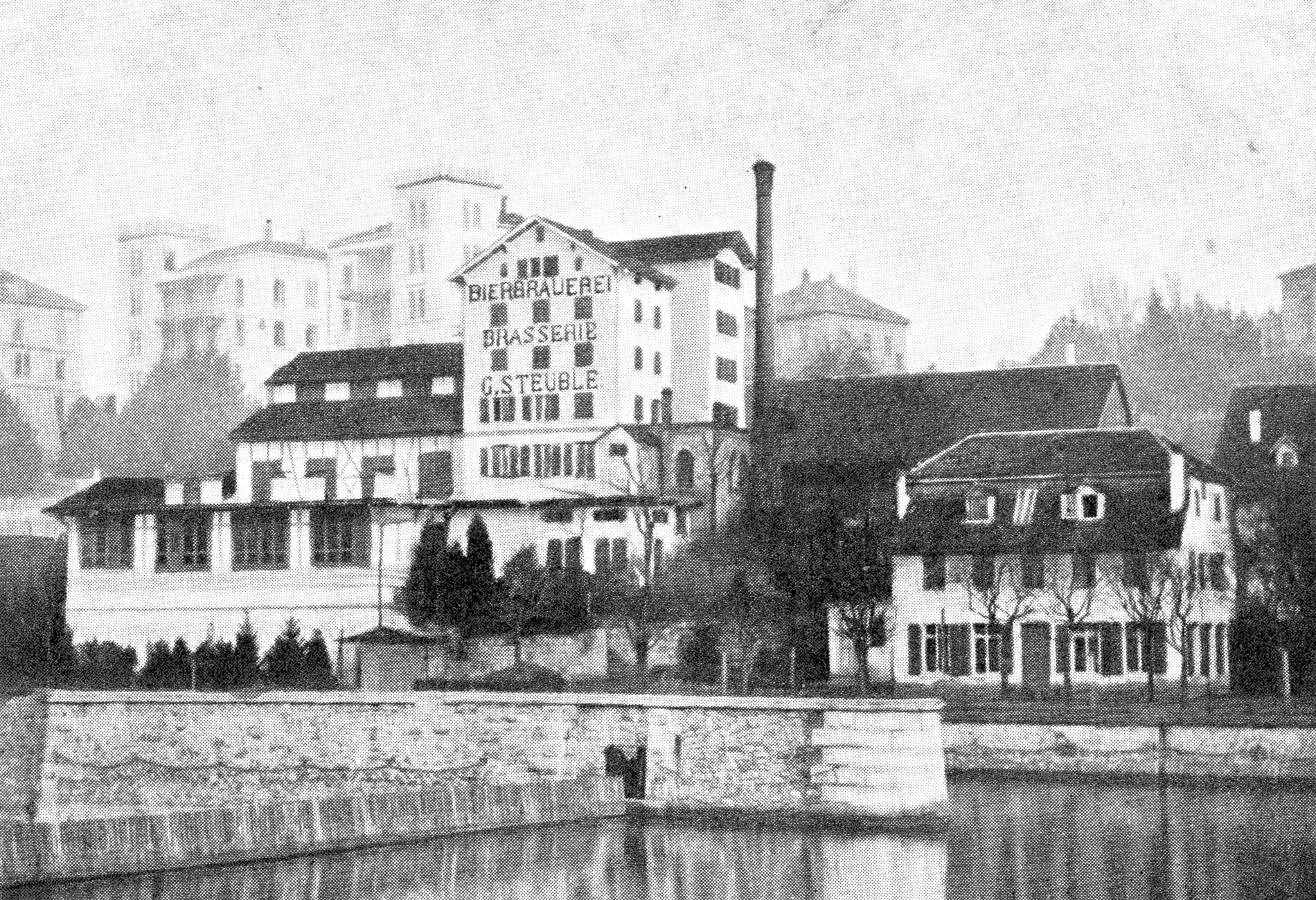
The brewery between 1882 and 1906

The Drahtschmidli opened as a spa on the Limmat in 1772. When he inherited it, Wilhelm Reiser turned the spa into a brewery. After a series of accidents and mishaps which caused the brewery to pass from owner to owner, the explosions during the construction of the Letten Tunnel led to cloudy beer and the city of Zurich took over the factory in 1906 (the customer list was purchased by the nearby Hürlimann Brewery).

In the 1930s, the idea of a youth hostel led to the creation of Zürich's Department of Vacation and Freetime (German: Vereinigung Ferien und Freizeit). They wanted to create a space with club rooms, craft rooms, workshops, a large multi-purpose room with a stage, and office space for the VFF. Because of the Second World War, the money could not be allocated until the late 1950s. To raise money to build the necessary accommodations, the Zurich Youth House (German: Zurcher Jugendhaus) raised 700,000 francs through three summer festivals. They announced they would use the money to build a new facility. Construction did not occur, and the city chose to renovate the current space instead, but had to deal with a group of 60 adolescents who kept renting out the spaces. The space closed down soon after, citing drug problems.

== Dynamo ==
By the 1980s, the youths of Zürich were upset about not having their own youth center. When the Zürich Opera House received a grant of 61,000,000 Swiss francs for renovation, the youths took to the streets. The Opernhauskrawalle riots led to the creation of the Autonomous Youth Center in Lindenhof (German: Autonomes Jugendzentrum Lindenhofbunker) and the Rote Fabrik. The Autonomes Jugendzentrum closed quickly, and was promptly demolished, again leaving the youth of Zürich with no center. In 1982, the city budgeted 15 million francs to extend the Drahtschmidlis, renaming it the Dynamo.

The Dynamo opened in May 1988 with the goal of "providing youths with a free space to develop themselves and assume responsibility". At first the Dynamo only offered boarding house services, hosted events, and taught courses, but quickly expanded to include a metalworking shop, graphic design workshop, recording studio, sound laboratory, and restaurant. During this time, the Dynamo also held many classes taught by the F+F School for Art and Media Design Zurich. Still the number of visitors continued to grow, and in 1996 about 100,000 adolescents visited the Dynamo.

As of 5 June 2008, The Dynamo had 26 employees, and 26 interns, and was undergoing a revamp of their metalworking shop. The government provides 2.1 million francs each year.

In 2017, the rivalry between Grasshopper Club Zürich and FC Zürich led to several Grasshopper Club fans being beaten with fists and iron bars in the Dynamo.
