= Züri brännt =

Züri brännt, meaning literally "Zürich is burning" may refer to:

- Züri brännt (film), a Swiss documentary film of 1980
- Opernhauskrawalle, the so-called youth protests of 1980 in the Swiss city of Zürich
