= Hans-Ulrich Zbinden =

Swiss bookseller and politician

- Born: 13 November 1932; Zurich, Switzerland
- Died: 4 December 1995 (aged 63); Zurich, Switzerland
- Occupations: Bookseller, publishing representative, politician
- Political party: Social Democratic Party
- Spouse(s): Hulda Nyffenegger (m. 1959, divorced) Esther Scheidegger (m. 1995)
- Children: None

Hans-Ulrich Zbinden (13 November 1932 – 4 December 1995) was a Swiss bookseller, publishing representative, and Socialist politician who was active in cultural policy in Zurich. He served on the Zurich Municipal Council from 1974 to 1990 and was president of the city's Social Democratic Party from 1983 to 1985.

== Early life and education ==
Zbinden was born in Zurich on 13 November 1932, the third of four children of Hans Werner Zbinden, an anthroposophic physician, and Olga née Knöpfel. He attended the Steiner school in Zurich and obtained his federal Matura at the private Tschulok Institute in the same city, before beginning an apprenticeship as a bookseller.

== Career in publishing ==
In 1964, Zbinden opened his own bookshop in Zurich-Fluntern and began working as a representative for German-language publishing houses including Walter, Suhrkamp, Luchterhand, Arche, Hoffmann und Campe, and Klaus Wagenbach. Through this work, he established contacts with numerous German-language literary figures including Otto F. Walter, Klaus Wagenbach, Christoph Hein, Günter Grass, and Christa Wolf.

In 1974, Zbinden and Dieter Bachmann took over the management of Suhrkamp Verlag AG Zürich, the newly founded Swiss subsidiary of the German publishing house. The two men advocated for an editorial programme focused on political and social themes that was open and diverse, including notably a work devoted to the history of the Swiss labour movement. This orientation provoked criticism from the company's partners and led to the resignation of the Zurich management, marking the failure of creating a Swiss subsidiary of Suhrkamp. From 1981, Zbinden served for many years as president of the Schweizer Buchzentrum in Olten.

== Political career ==
Zbinden became involved in Zurich city politics in parallel with his publishing work. He joined the Social Democratic Party (SP) in 1969 and was elected in 1974 to the Zurich Municipal Council, where he served until 1990 and chaired the Socialist group from 1978. Active in cultural policy, he became known in 1984 for a motion calling for the termination of existing subsidy contracts between the city and its four major cultural institutions: the Opernhaus, Schauspielhaus, Tonhalle, and Kunsthaus. This termination aimed to facilitate their takeover by the Canton of Zurich and, ultimately, to have the canton assume the costs borne by the city for their regional services. As his group's spokesperson for cultural policy, Zbinden also sat on the city of Zurich's literature commission and, from approximately 1978 to 1994, on the board of directors of the Schauspielhaus.

Following the "Opera House riots" (Opernhauskrawalle) of 1980, part of the youth unrest in Switzerland, Zbinden was elected in 1983 to the presidency of the Zurich city SP. He succeeded in largely calming tensions both within his party and between the city executive and representatives of the youth movement. He resigned in 1985 for health reasons.

== Personal life ==
In 1959, Zbinden married Hulda Nyffenegger. After their divorce, he remarried in 1995 to the Zurich journalist and writer Esther Scheidegger, with whom he had lived since the 1980s. He had no children. Zbinden died in Zurich on 4 December 1995.

== Bibliography ==
- Neue Zürcher Zeitung, 30 October 1974
- Neue Zürcher Zeitung, 6 December 1995 (obituary)
- Der Bund, 10 January 1985
