= Sequence (disambiguation) =

A sequence, in mathematics, is an ordered list of elements.

Sequence may also refer to:

== Arts and media ==
=== Film ===
- Sequence (filmmaking), a series of shots or scenes, edited together in succession
- Sequence (journal), a film journal
- Séquences, a Quebec film magazine
- Sequence (2013 film), a 2013 short fantasy horror film
- Sequence, a 16 minute film directed by David Winning

=== Games ===
- Sequence (game), a board-and-card game distributed by Jax Ltd., Inc.
- Before the Echo, a video game also known as Sequence

=== Music ===
- Sequence (music), a passage which is successively repeated at different pitches
- Sequence (musical form), a medieval Latin poem or its musical setting which became part of the Mass
- The Sequence, a 1980s all-female hip-hop/funk trio

== Science, technology, and mathematics ==
=== Biology and medicine ===
- Sequence (biology), the primary structure of a biopolymer
  - Sequencing, determining the primary structure of an unbranched biopolymer
    - DNA sequencing, determining the order of the nucleotide bases in a DNA molecule
    - Protein sequencing
  - Primary sequence, the sequence of a biological macromolecule
  - Sequence analysis
- Sequence (medicine), a series of ordered consequences due to a single cause

=== Other uses in science, technology, and mathematics ===
- Sequence (geology), a succession of geological events
- Archaeological sequence
- Sequence diagram, used to visualise the design of a computing system
- Sequence of events, a time-related notion in physics and metaphysics
- Sequences (book), mathematics book by Heini Halberstam and Klaus Roth
- List (abstract data type)
- A rarely used programming language
- A term for a pair of sprites

== Other uses ==
- Sequence of tenses, in grammar

== See also ==
- Sequencer (disambiguation)
- Sequent (disambiguation)
- Sequential (disambiguation)
- Sequin (disambiguation)
- Sequention
- Sequentor
