= Rote Fabrik =

Cultural centre in Zurich

Coordinates: 47°20′36″N 8°32′12″E

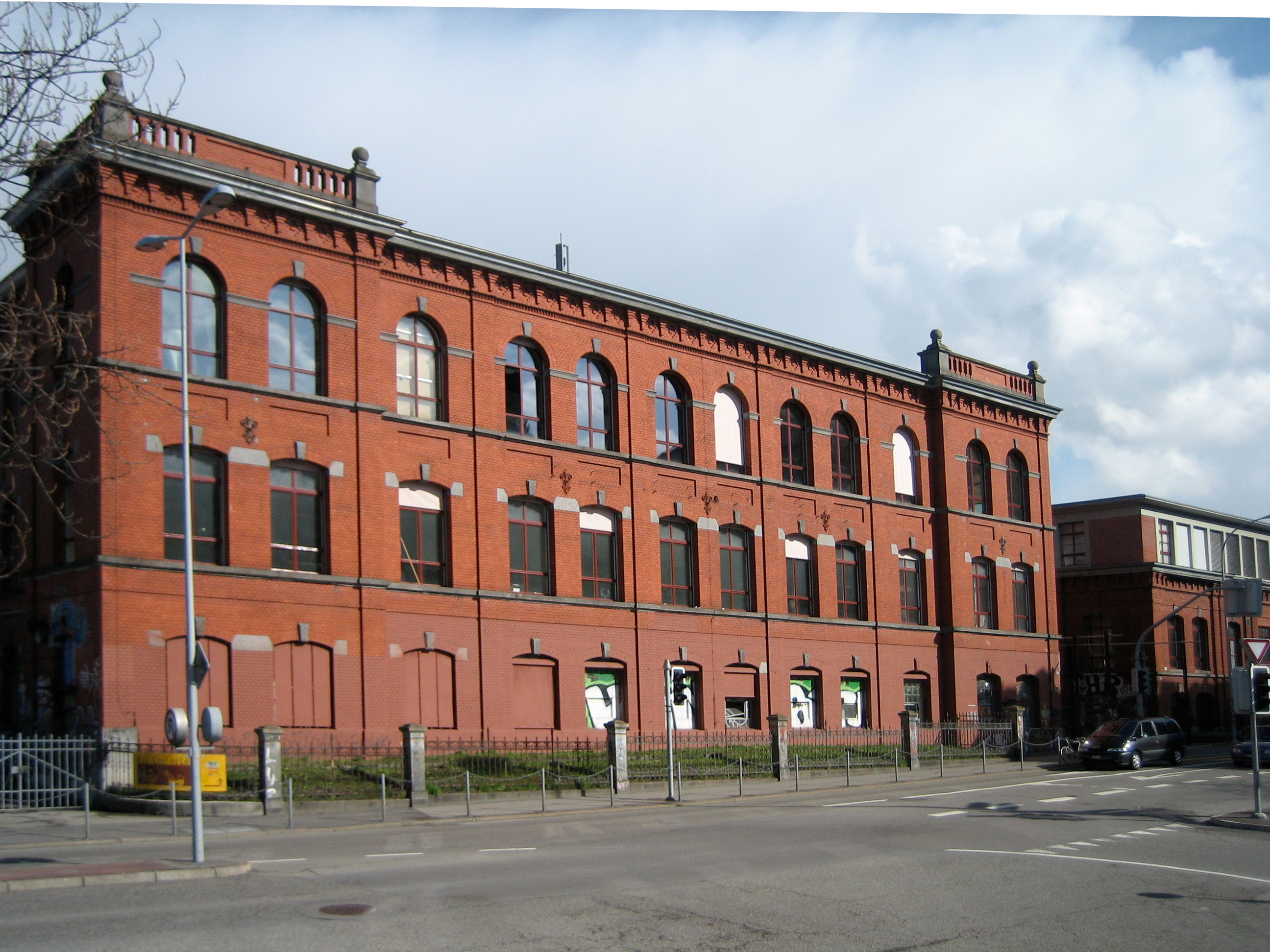
- Rote Fabrik, viewed from Seestrasse
- Interactive map of the Rote Fabrik area

General information
- Location: Zurich, Switzerland, Seestrasse 395
- Completed: 1892; 134 years ago

Design and construction
- Architect: Carl Arnold Séquin-Bronner
- Architecture firm: Sequin and Knobel

Website
- rotefabrik.ch

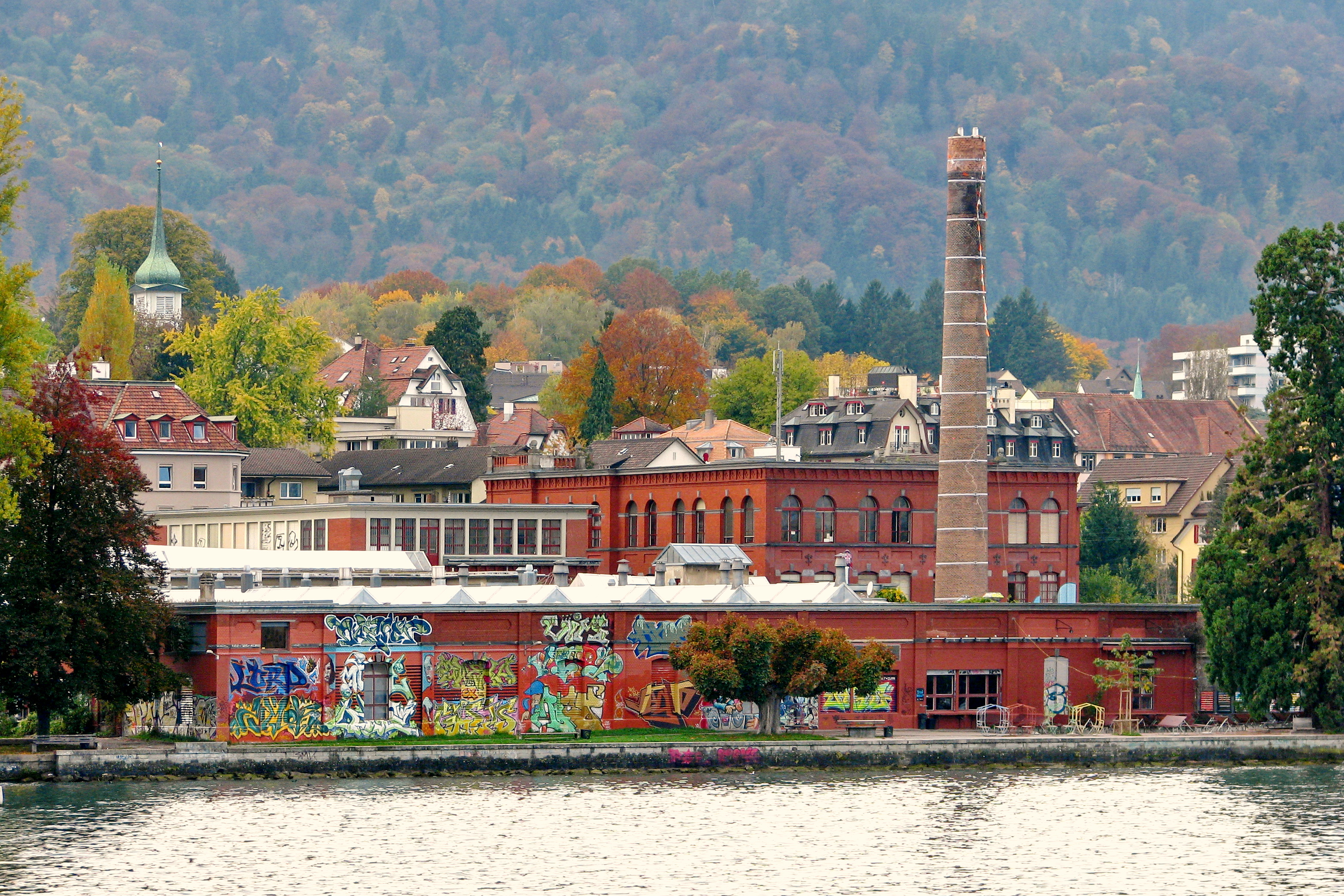
View from Lake Zurich

Rote Fabrik (lit. 'Red Factory') is a former factory in the Wollishofen neighbourhood of Zurich, Switzerland. It is now used as a music venue and cultural centre. It is so named because the buildings are made of red brick, but also because left-wing parties were part of the campaign to turn the location into a cultural centre.

== History ==
=== The factory ===
The Rote Fabrik was built in 1892 for the Seidenfirma Henneberg company, according to a design by the architect Carl Arnold Séquin-Bronner. In 1899, the Henneberg company was taken over by the Stünzi Söhne Seidenwebereien company, based in Horgen. In 1940, the factory was taken over by the ITT Corporation. In 1972, the city acquired the factory and planned to demolish the building in order to widen the adjacent Seestrasse.

=== The cultural centre ===
In 1974 the Social Democratic Party of Switzerland (SP) launched a proposal to transform the factory building in the Wollishofen neighbourhood of Zurich into a cultural centre. The derelict factory was squatted. As a result, studios were set up for artists and cultural events were held. In 1977, voters made the choice for the preservation of the building and use as a cultural centre. It was planned to host exhibitions and events and to serve as a music venue.

In 1980, it became known that the Zurich Opernhaus (Zurich Opera House) was renting the Rote Fabrik for storage space and that it would be granted CHF 61 million for renovations. Youth activists were outraged that there was no money for a social centre. A three-day festival at the opera house began on 30 May 1980 and around 200 uninvited young protesters came to demand an autonomous youth centre. The Stadtpolizei Zürich and state Kantonspolizei Zürich police corps had been informed beforehand, and stationed themselves in the foyer of the opera house. When the young people occupied the stairs, the demonstration became a street battle, the police using water cannons, tear gas and rubber bullets. The riots became known as the Opernhauskrawalle (Opera House riots).A first political compromise was the so-called AJZ, a temporary youth centre near Zurich main station. The most prominent politician involved was Emilie Lieberherr, then member of the city's executive (Stadtrat) authority.

On 25 October 1980, the cultural centre Rote Fabrik opened. Music and theater were the focus of activities. Some independent theater groups which gained increasing influence in the local cultural scene made their debuts at the Rote Fabrik. A referendum in 1987 decided that the Rote Fabrik should be used as an alternative cultural centre and also subsidised.

The centre has hosted authors such as Günter Grass and Alice Schwarzer and bands such as Bad Religion, Manu Chao, Nirvana and the Red Hot Chili Peppers. The centre also has a contemporary art gallery called the Shedhalle and a restaurant, Ziegel oh Lac.

In the early 1990s, the area was redeveloped. In 2002, the subsidies were adjusted to 2.3 million francs. With this money it became possible to organise more than 300 events annually.

In 2012, a large fire fought by 50 firemen destroyed artists studios. A history of the Rote Fabrik entitled Bewegung tut gut (Movement is good) was published in 2021.

== See also ==
- Jugendkulturhaus Dynamo
