= F+F School of Art and Design Zürich =

Art school in Zürich, Switzerland

Coordinates: 47.3818078°N 8.4900093°E

The F+F Schule für Kunst und Design or F+F is a private Art School in Zürich, Switzerland. F+F stands for the German Form + Farbe (shape + color), a discipline practiced at the Bauhaus. The school was previously known as F+F Schule für Experimentelle Gestaltung (Experimental Creation) and F+F Schule für Kunst und Design.

== History ==
The F+F was founded in 1971 by Bendicht Fivian, Peter Gygax, Peter Jenny, Hansjörg Mattmüller, Doris Stauffer, and Serge Stauffer. It was the first progressive art school in Switzerland. Embracing the revolutionary spirit of 1968, it wanted to be a non-elitist alternative for art and design training and welcomed the wider population to its evening and Saturday courses. The F+F was an alternative to the Zurich University of the Arts, which at that time only offered classes in applied arts. Without a main school building, classes were initially taught at various locations around the city, including in the Jugendkulturhaus Dynamo, which was the center of the political movements of the 1980s Zürich. In need of a larger location, the F+F moved to a warehouse in Altstetten Zurich, a building which previously housed the art collection of the Swiss company UBS. The F+F has also use of a large studio at the Rote Fabrik since its beginning. The main building hosts a canteen and a printing workshop.

The school has evolved from a registered society into a charitable foundation in 2006. The founding members of the Board of Trustees were among others art historian Juri Steiner, publisher Walter Keller, entrepreneur Werner Kieser, and film director Samir. The school is supported from both the City of Zürich and the Canton of Zürich.

== Education ==
The F+F runs Film, Photography, Fashion, Fine Art and Graphic Design programmes, a Foundation course and two programmes leading to an Federal Diploma of Vocational Education and Training EFZ of either of Photography or Graphic Design. It also offers classes and workshops for young people and for adults.

Students of the F+F graduate with a nationally recognized higher professional qualification (Art Diploma). Matura (completion of secondary school) is not required for admission, the F+F thereby offering an alternative to studying at a Swiss Hochschule. Studies at F+F are practically oriented, but the students also acquire sound theoretical knowledge of the subject.

All teachers and lecturers at the F+F are practising artists, designers and theorists. The F+F teachers are experienced, often internationally well-known personalities who are firmly established in their field. There is a regular exchange with other art schools like École Supérieure d’Art de Clermont Métropole ESACM in France; the University of Reading UK; or the NID Ahmedabad and Gandhinagar, India.

The F+F also cooperates with art institutions like the Migros Museum of Contemporary Art, where in 2021, it celebrated its 50th anniversary with the Radical Education Festival.

== Notable alumni ==
- Stephan Eicher
- Klaudia Schifferle
- Muda Mathis from the band Les Reines Prochaines
- Peter Trachsel
- Christian Rothacher
- Barbara Ellmerer
- Christian Philipp Müller
- H. R. Fricker
- Frantiček Klossner
- Costa Vece
- Bessie Nager
- Ursula Palla
- Elena Könz
- Simon Otto

== Works cited ==
- F + F Zürich : das offene Kunststudium (in German). Bern: Benteli. 1991. ISBN 3716508098. OCLC 29549260.
- Genie gibt's : die siebziger Jahre an der F & F Schule für experimentelle Gestaltung (in German). Frankfurt am Main: Betzel. 1981. ISBN 3921818907. OCLC 601777437.
- Lutz, Hans-Rudolf; Mattmüller, H. J.; Stauffer, Serge (1970). Experiment F+[und] F. 1965-1970. (Die Klasse "Form+Farbe" an der Kunstgewerbeschule Zürich.) (in German). Zürich: H.R. Lutz. OCLC 702220462.
- Serge Stauffer: Kunst als Forschung : Essays, Gespräche, Übersetzungen, Studien (in German). Zürich: Scheidegger & Spiess. 2013. ISBN 9783858813770. OCLC 828611547.
- Doris Stauffer Eine Monografie (in German) (1. Aufl ed.). Zürich: Scheidegger & Spiess. 2015. ISBN 9783858814456. OCLC 899153972.
