= Kantonspolizei Zürich =

Police department of the Canton of Zurich, Switzerland

Zurich Cantonal Police Kantonspolizei Zürich
- Flag of the city and canton of Zurich
- Common name: Kantonspolizei Zürich
- Abbreviation: Kapo ZH

Agency overview
- Formed: 1804
- Employees: approx. 3,800 full time jobs, of which 2,247 police officers and about 1,500 civilians (2015)
- Annual budget: CHF587 million

Jurisdictional structure
- Operations jurisdiction: Canton of Zurich, CH
- Area: 1,729 square kilometres (668 sq mi)
- Population: 1,504,346 (2017)
- Legal jurisdiction: Government of the canton of Zurich
- Governing body: Direktion der Justiz und des Innern
- General nature: Local civilian police

Operational structure
- Headquarters: Kasernenstrasse 29, CH-8004 Zurich
- Agency executives: Marius Weyermann, Kommandant; John Ruppli, Chef Kommandobereich 1; Roger Bührer, Chef Kommandobereich 2; Jann Leutenegger, Chef Kriminalpolizei; Werner Schmid, Chef Sicherheitspolizei; Thomas Iseli, Chef Verkehrspolizei
- Child agency: Kriminalpolizei, Sicherheitspolizei, Verkehrspolizei; Regionalpolizei; Flughafenpolizei Zürich; Kriminalmuseum; Verkehrsleitzentrale; Seepolizei

Facilities
- Stations: about 60 as of 2015
- Police cars: unknown
- Police boats: 2 (assumed, at least one speedboat, see image)
- Helicopters: 1
- Dogs: unknown

Website
- www.kapo.zh.ch (in German)

The Kantonspolizei Zürich (lit. 'Zurich Cantonal Police') is the police department of the canton of Zurich in Switzerland. The Kantonspolizei Zürich exists within the cantonal legal structure to enforce criminal, security, and traffic law on behalf of the government of the canton of Zurich. It is empowered with the executive authority of the Direktion der Justiz und des Innern, the Department of Justice and Home Affairs of the Canton of Zurich.

== History ==
The Kantonspolizei Zürich was established in 1804 as the Landjäger-Corps des Kantons Zürich after the period of civil unrest known as the Bockenkrieg. Its administrative seat was formed in the City of Zurich in 1901.

In the same year, the Kantonspolizei founded the first museum of crime to exist in Switzerland, the Kriminalmuseum der Kantonspolizei Zürich. The museum, originally used only for training of new recruits, opened to the public in 1958.

The Kantonspolizei Zürich is the legally responsible police force in all municipalities in the canton of Zurich, including the City of Zurich, for matters pertaining to cantonal law.

== Duties ==
The Kantonspolizei Zürich is responsible for law enforcement at the Zurich Airport, as well as anti-terror protection in the widest sense and the control of potentially dangerous demonstrations and riots. One notable incident of major police action was the Opernhauskrawalle youth protest on 30/31 May 1980 at the Sechseläutenplatz in Zurich, documented in the 2000 Swiss documentary film Züri brännt. Another incident was the 1968 Globuskrawalle, rioting that took place at the former Globus department store building at the Bahnhofbrücke Zurich.

Further duties of the Kantonspolizei Zürich include the support of its municipal police stations, road patrol and control, criminal investigation, and water policing on Lake Zurich.

The Kantonspolizei Zürich is the largest police force in Switzerland, counting both personnel and financing. It comprises 3,800 full-time positions, of which 2,247 are police officers, including about 100 Sicherheitsassistenten (security assistants) at the Zurich Airport, as of January 2015. The KZ also provides the ePolice internet service, and has run the Kriminalmuseum (criminal museum) in its headquarters since 1959. It maintains an international exchange program with police forces in other countries.

== Gallery ==
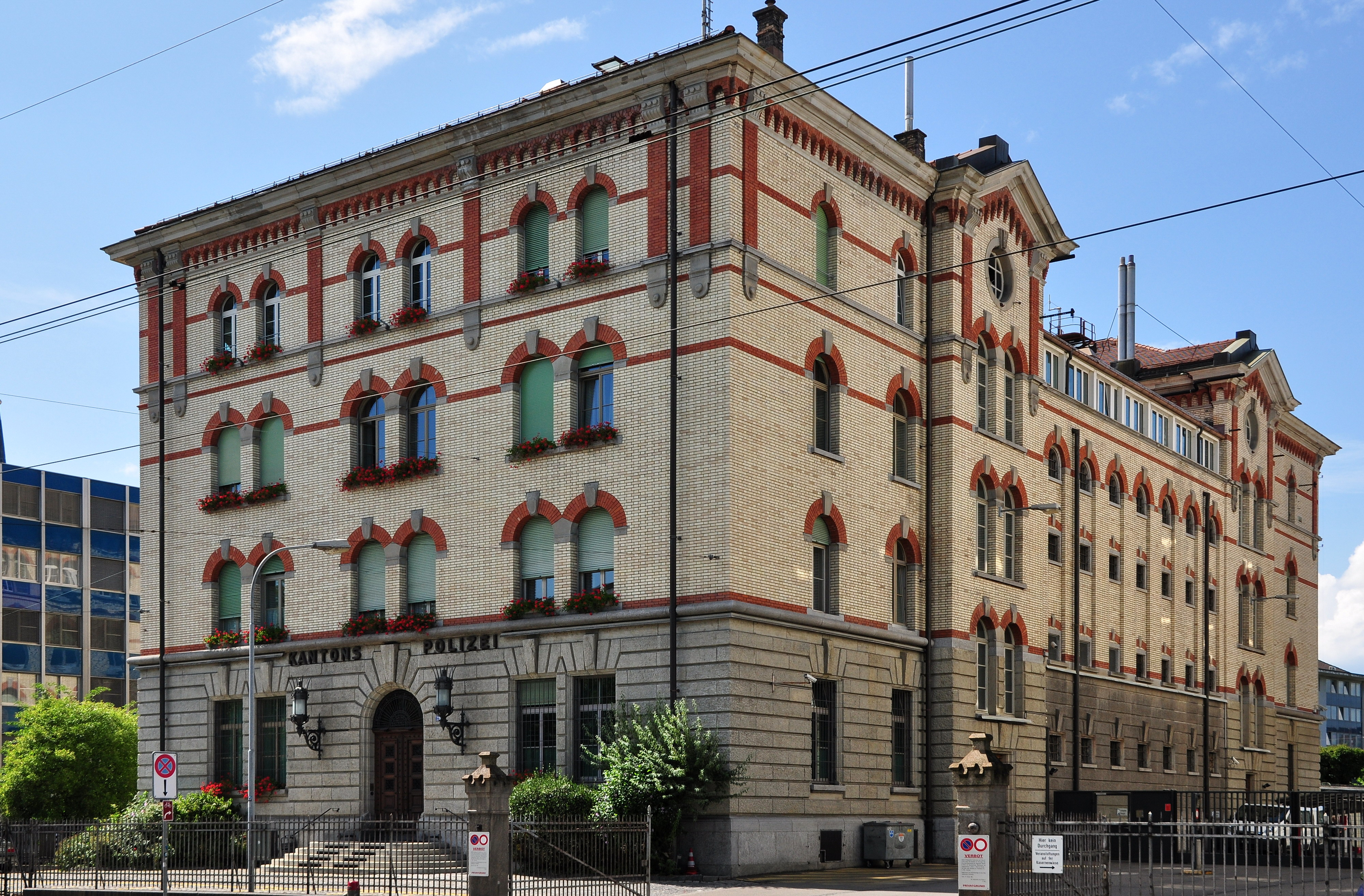
The historic Kaserne building of the police force in Zurich

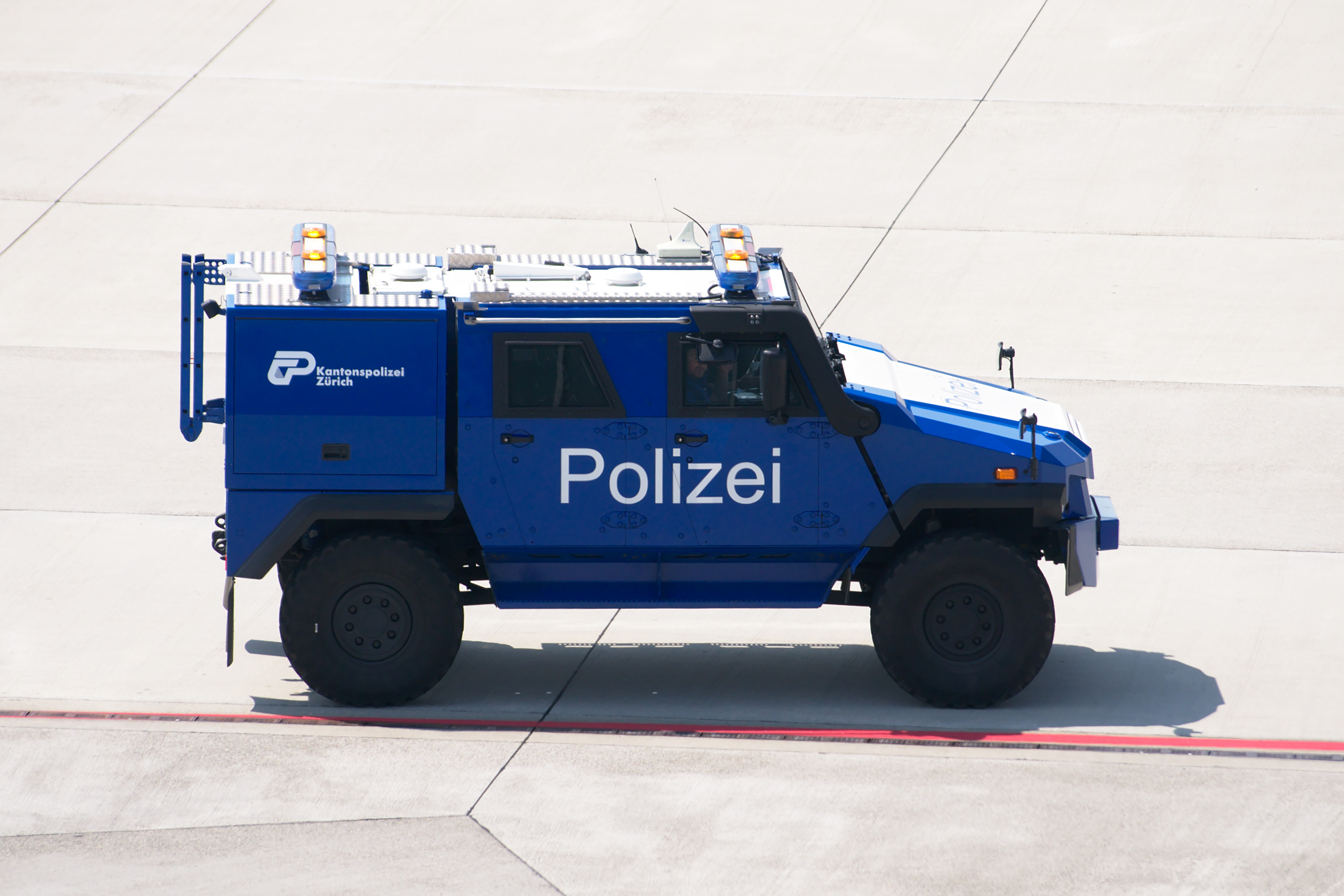
Movag Eagle IV at Zurich Airport

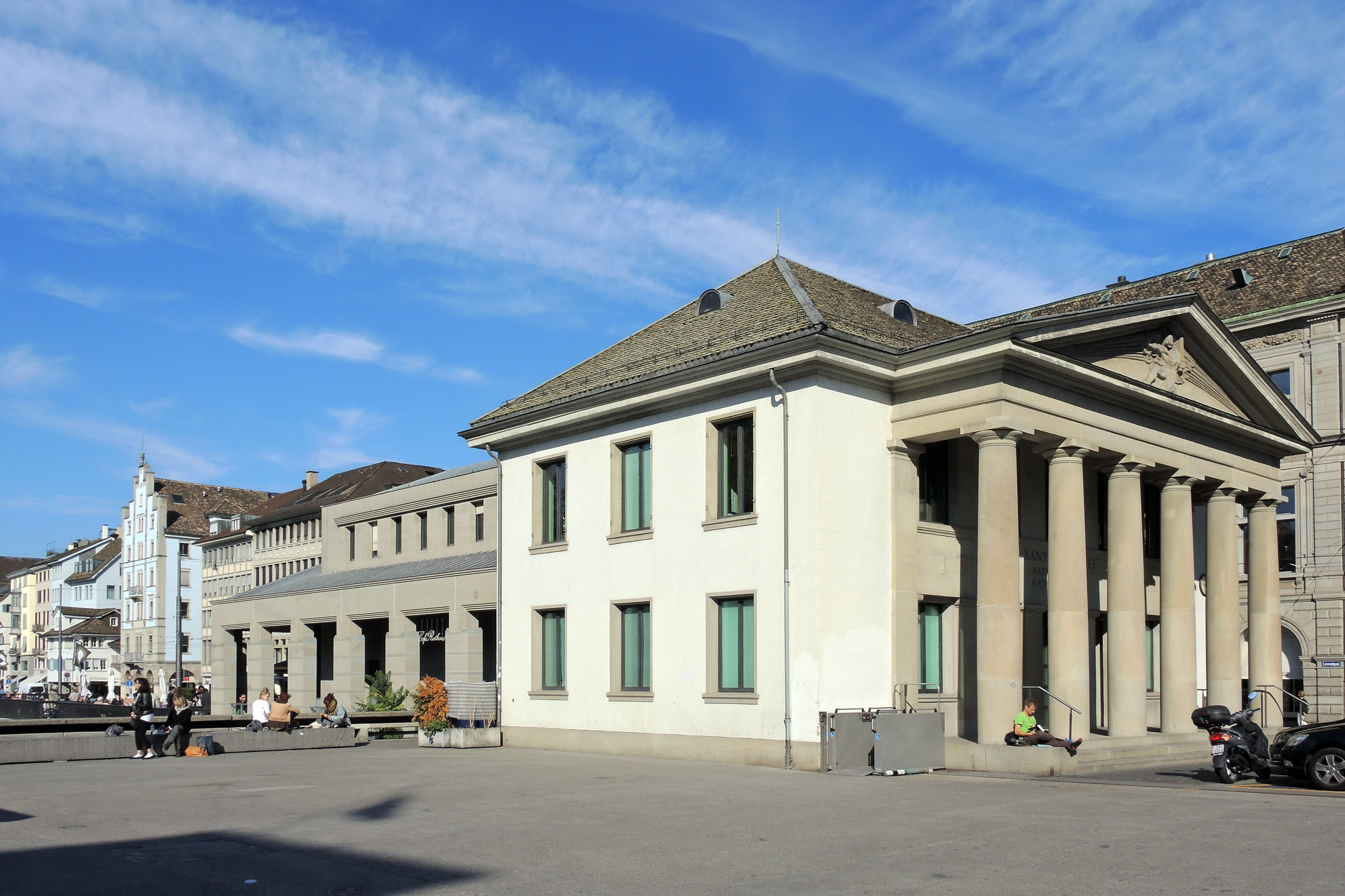
The historic police station at Rathausbrücke–Limmatquai

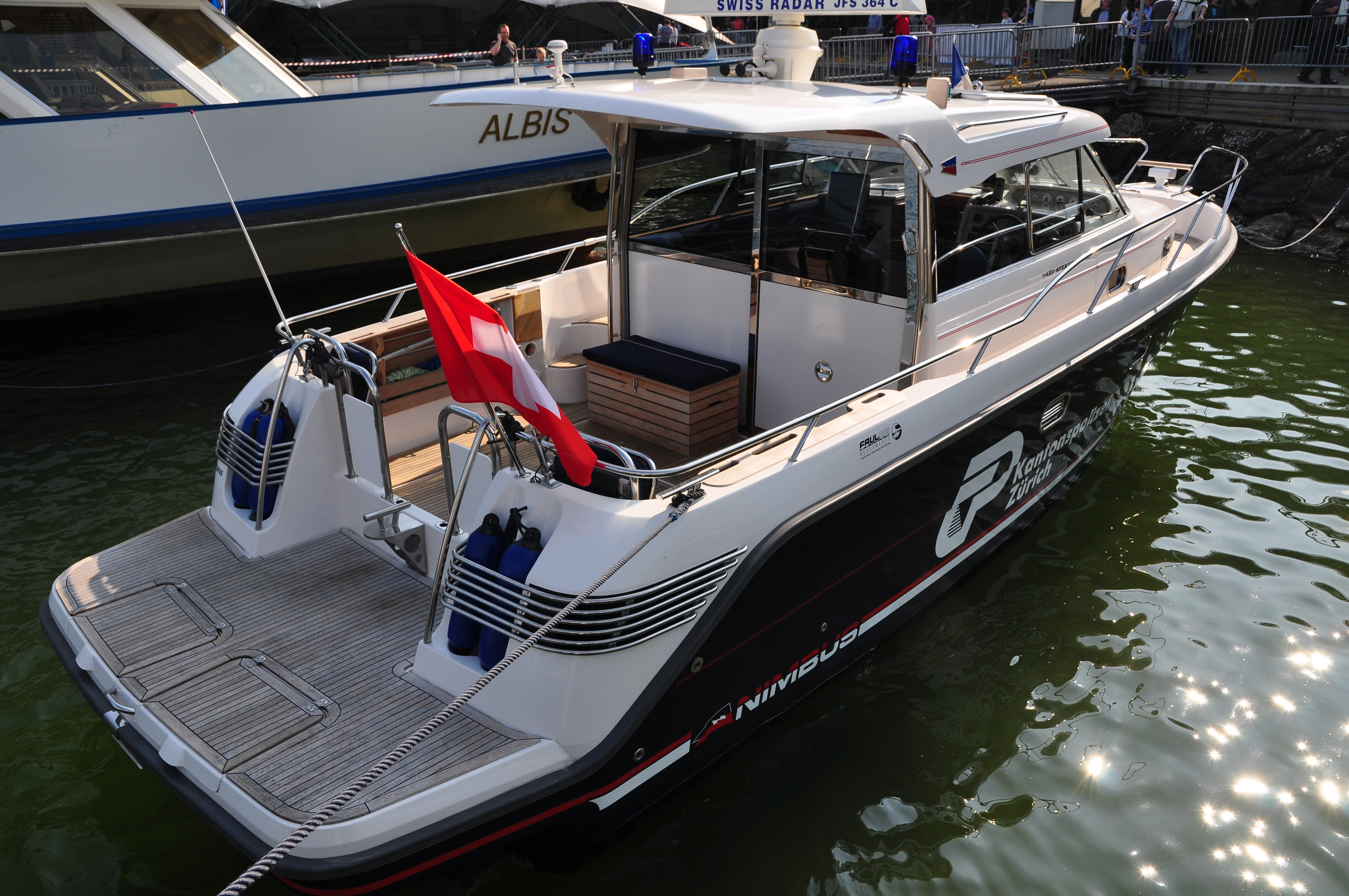
Motorboat in Wollishofen at the shipyards of Zürichsee-Schifffahrtsgesellschaft ZSG in March 2011

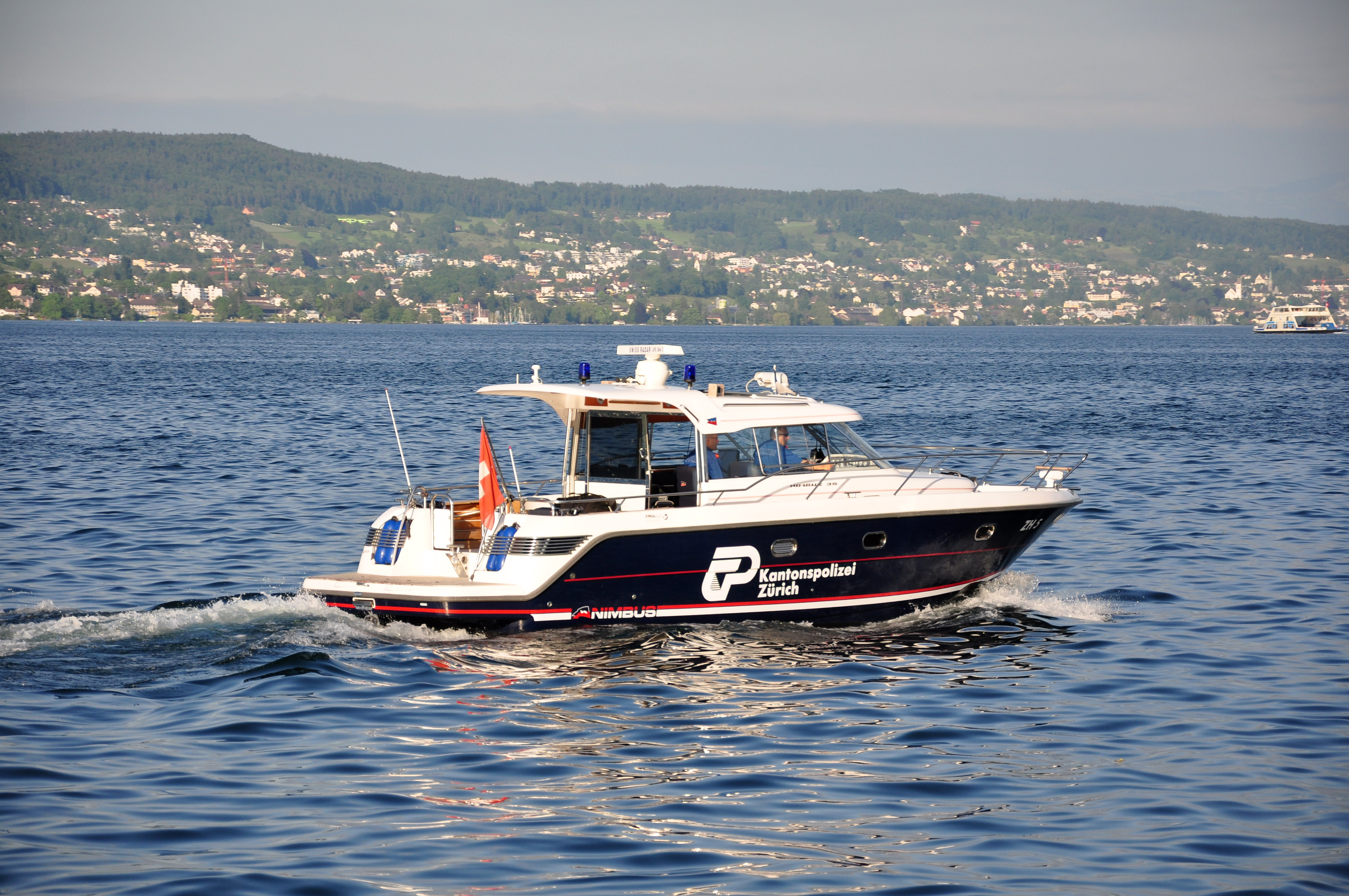
Police speedboat near Horgen

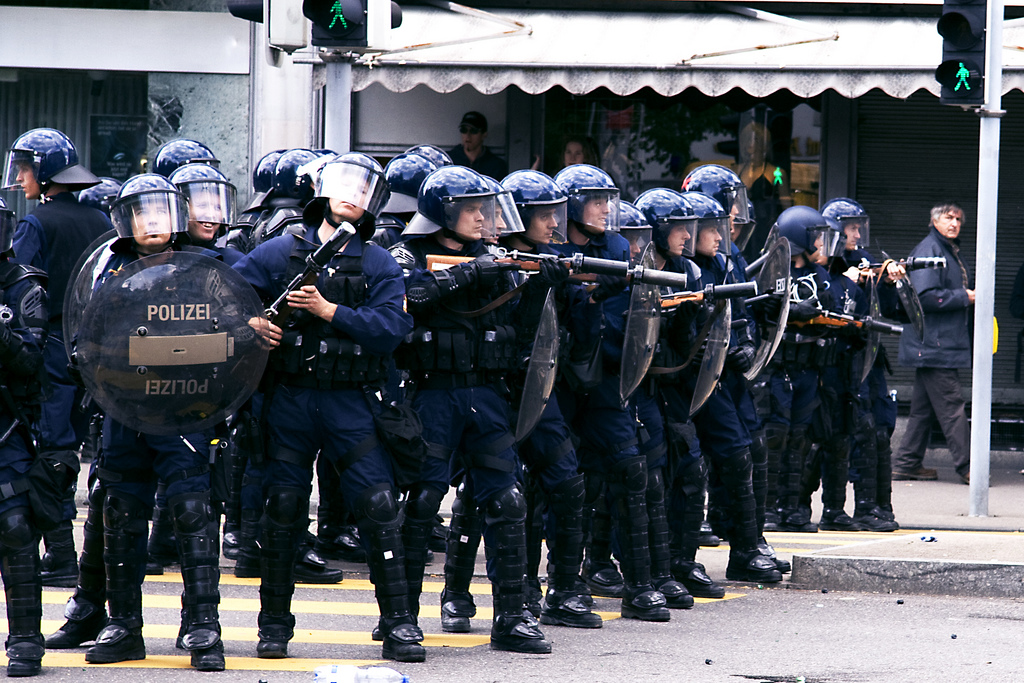
Riot police in the May Day riots in 2008

Unmarked riot police van in 2016
