= Emilie Lieberherr =

Swiss politician

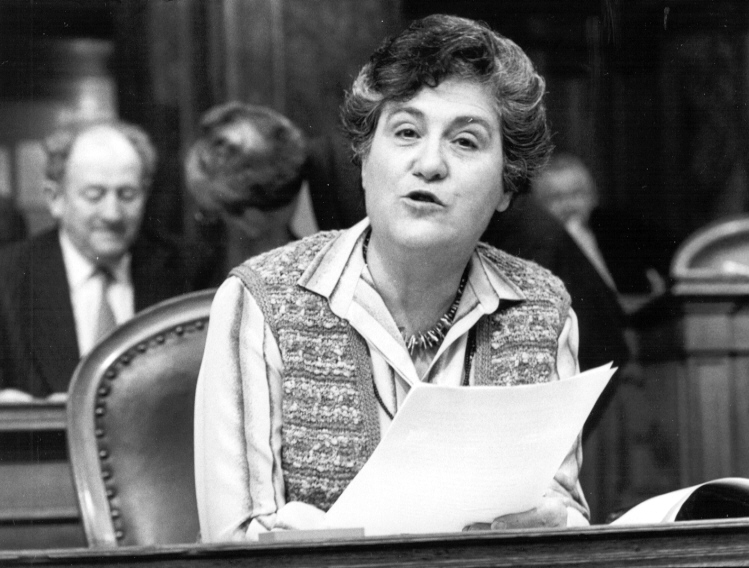
- Emilie Lieberherr (1986)
- Born: 14 October 1924; Erstfeld, Switzerland
- Died: 3 January 2011 (aged 86); Zollikerberg, Switzerland
- Education: University of Bern
- Occupation: Politician
- Known for: Women's suffrage in Switzerland

Emilie Lieberherr (14 October 1924 – 3 January 2011) was a Swiss politician and women's rights activist. A leading figure in the movement for women's suffrage in Switzerland, she chaired the action committee behind the 1969 march to Bern and addressed the crowd of thousands who gathered on the Federal Square in Bern on 1 March 1969 to demand the right to vote.

A member of the Social Democratic Party, Lieberherr became the first woman elected to the city executive (Stadtrat) of Zürich in 1970, heading its Social Welfare Office until her resignation in 1994. She represented the Canton of Zürich in the Council of States from 1978 to 1983 and served as the first president of the Federal Office for Gender Equality. Over her decades in office, she became known for pioneering social policy, introducing advance payment of alimony in Zürich, co-initiating the medically supervised distribution of heroin to severe addicts that became part of Switzerland's four-pillar drug policy, and establishing care homes for the elderly, youth centers, and housing for the disadvantaged.

== Early life and education ==
Lieberherr was born 14 October 1924 in Erstfeld, Switzerland, the second of three sisters, to Jakob Lieberherr (1881–1941), a machinist at the Swiss Federal Railways, and Theresia Lieberherr (née Dallabona; 1888–1969), into a middle class family.

Her paternal family was originally from Nesslau. Her maternal grandparents, Giovanni Dallabona and Lucia Dallabona (née Campini), where originally from Trodena in Trentino Alto Adige, and came to Switzerland to work as miners during the construction of the Gotthard Tunnel, later remaining in Uri and Zurich.

She attended Theresianum Igenbohl, a Catholic boarding school during her youth and graduated with a commercial diploma.

== Professional career ==
After graduating, she worked as a secretary at the Swiss Bank Corporation in Zurich for three years. In 1947, Lieberherr left the position to then work four years as a personal trainer at the Oscar Weber AG in Bern. Lieberherr later earned a doctorate in economics from the University of Bern after attending from the year 1952 to 1956. After earning her doctorate, she moved to the United States for three years during which time she worked as a governess for Henry Fonda, taking care of his children, Peter and Jane Fonda. Returning to Switzerland in 1960, Lieberherr took a position as a vocational school teacher for sales staff in Zurich from 1960 to 1970.

== Activism and Political Career ==
In 1961, Lieberherr co-founded the Consumer Forum of Switzerland. Towards the end of the 1960s, she became more politically involved, joining and becoming one of the leading figures in the movement of women's suffrage in Switzerland. Lieberherr became the President of the Action Committee that lead the March to Bern. On March 1, 1969, she spoke to a crowd of thousands gathered in the Federal Square to demand the right to vote from the Swiss government. Lieberherr joined the Social Democratic Party of Switzerland soon after and from 1970 until 1994, when she resigned, she was the first female city councilor of the city of Zurich and the head of the Zurich Social Welfare Office.

Lieberherr was the representative of the Canton of Zurich in the Federal Assembly from 1978 to 1983. She also served as the first President of the Federal Commission for Women's Issues in Switzerland. Up to 1978, she was re-elected with support from the Social Democratic Party until she had a falling out with them in 1982. In 1986 she was re-elected again with support from the Zurich Trade Union Confederation. Lieberherr was officially excluded from the Social Democratic Party in 1990 for supporting Josef Estermann instead of the selected party candidate during the election for the City Executive Committee.

In 2014 Emilie Lieberherr's work was honoured by the Gesellschaft zu Fraumünster.

== Social Work ==
Aside from working as the head of social services for 24 years, Lieberherr did a lot of work for the public while in office. She was the co-initiator of the medically controlled distribution of heroin for severe cases of addiction and was involved in constructing the four pillar model of the Swiss drug policy. She introduced alimony advance in Zurich and established the Foundation of Residential Care for the Elderly. Throughout her time in office she also built twenty-two homes in Switzerland for the disenfranchised, established youth centers, and introduced programs for unemployed young adults.

== Youth protests of 1980 ==
The further, for that time extremely high subventions, but lacking of alternative governmental cultural programs for the youth in Zürich, occurred in 1980 to the so-called Opernhauskrawalle youth protests – Züri brännt, meaning Zürich is burning, documented in the Swiss documentary film Züri brännt (movie). The most prominent politician involved was Emilie Lieberherr, then member of the city's executive (Stadtrat) authorities.

== Literature ==
- Trudi of Fellenberg Bitzi: Emilie Lieberherr: pioneer of Swiss woman policy. NZZ Libro, Zürich 2019, ISBN 978-3-03810-408-7.

== Video ==
- Monika Rosenberg: the rebellious. In: NZZ Folio. 4/2006 (archived version).
- «I have read the riot act the Federal Council». In: Tages-Anzeiger, January 4, 2011 (interview).
- Balz Spörri: it mocked the Bundesrat. In: Swiss family, April 2019 (German).
