= Sequent (disambiguation) =

A sequent is a formalized statement of provability used within sequent calculus.

Sequent may also refer to:

- Sequent (MUD), text-based online game software
- Sequent Computer Systems, a defunct computer hardware company
- Sequent calculus

== See also ==
- Sequence (disambiguation)
- Sequential
- Sequentional
- Sequention
- Sequentor
