= Sequencer =

Sequencer may refer to:

== Technology ==
- Drum sequencer (controller), an electromechanical system for controlling a sequence of events automatically
- DNA sequencer, a machine used to automatically produce a sequence readout from a biological DNA sample
- Microsequencer, part of the control unit of a CPU
- Music sequencer, software or hardware device for recording, playing, and editing digital music data
- Protein sequencer, a machine used to automatically produce a sequence readout from a biological protein sample

== Arts and entertainment ==
- Sequencer (Larry Fast album), 1976
- Sequencer (Covenant album), 1996
- "Sequencer", a song by Al Di Meola from his album Scenario

== See also ==
- Sequence (disambiguation)
