= Municipal police (Switzerland) =

Names
German: Stadtpolizei or Gemeindepolizei
French: Police de la Ville or Police municipale
Italian: Polizia della città or Polizia comunale
Romansh: Polizia Cumûnala

The municipal police of Switzerland are a series of separate forces maintained by the municipalities of each canton. Between 100 and 300 municipal police forces operate there (approximately one-in-ten municipalities have their own force). Most are responsible for general law and order and parking enforcement only. In some larger cities, municipal police carry out traffic control and in Zurich, Winterthur and Lausanne they provide a full policing service. Municipal police forces send their recruits to the same regional police academies as the cantons do.

For advanced training, the municipalities send their officers to the Swiss Police Institute.

== Forces ==
Canton of Aargau: At the beginning of the millennium, the government formed Aargau regional police forces, in the center of each city. Regional police forces are: Wettingen, Baden, Aarau, Lenzburg, Zofingen, and Frick valley.

Canton of Bern: A referendum of 11 March 2007 the Bernese people decided that on the first January 2008 Bern city police would join cantonal police forces. All municipal corps were united to the year 2011.

Canton of Grisons: In the large-scale, highly compartmentalized canton, municipal autonomy is of high importance, and so also within the cantonal police. The Grisons city police are in Chur (Coire), St. Moritz and Arosa.

Canton of Solothurn: Since 2005, the police became employed by a cantonal unit. This idea was abandoned in 2009, because the city did not want to give up their police powers. As of January 2010, the municipal police corps Solothurn, Grenchen and Olten persist.

Canton Ticino (Ticino): Lugano, Locarno, Bellinzona and several municipalities have their own Corps.

Canton of Neuchâtel (Neuchâtel): The city police Neuchâtel became integrated into the 2014 cantonal police forces, as had already happened with the City Corps of Le Locle and La Chaux-de-Fonds.

Canton of Vaud (Vaud): The 2009 Vaud vote for the creation of a police unit failed: The cantonal police within federalism was reorganized, maintaining municipal police powers. The most important corps leads the Lausanne. Other More Vaud police corps are the City of Yverdon, Montreux Morges.

Canton Wallis (Valais): In this mountain canton, numerous communal police forces operate. Urban Corps are Sion (Sion), Martigny (Martigny), Sierre (Sierre) and Brig

Canton of Zurich: In 2001, voters rejected the establishment of a police unit. Since then, in addition to the Kantonspolizei Zürich essentially acting as the Stadtpolizei Zürich, the Zürich City Police, and the city police Winterthur in accordance with the Police Organization Act of 2006. In addition, around forty other municipal and local police forces operate.

The tally of Swiss city and municipal police forces can not be established, due to different rules.

== Gallery ==
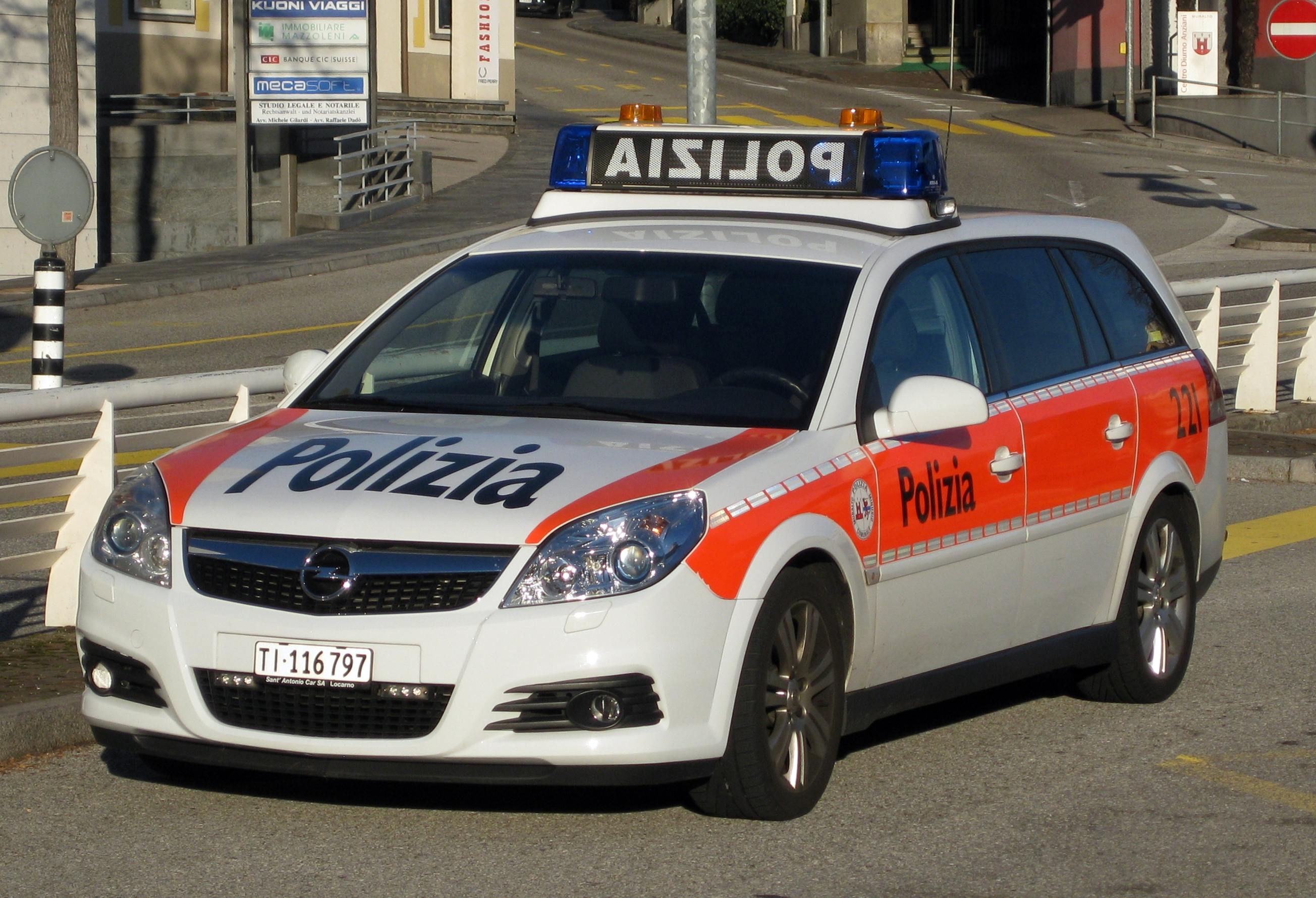
Locarno commune police (Canton Ticino).

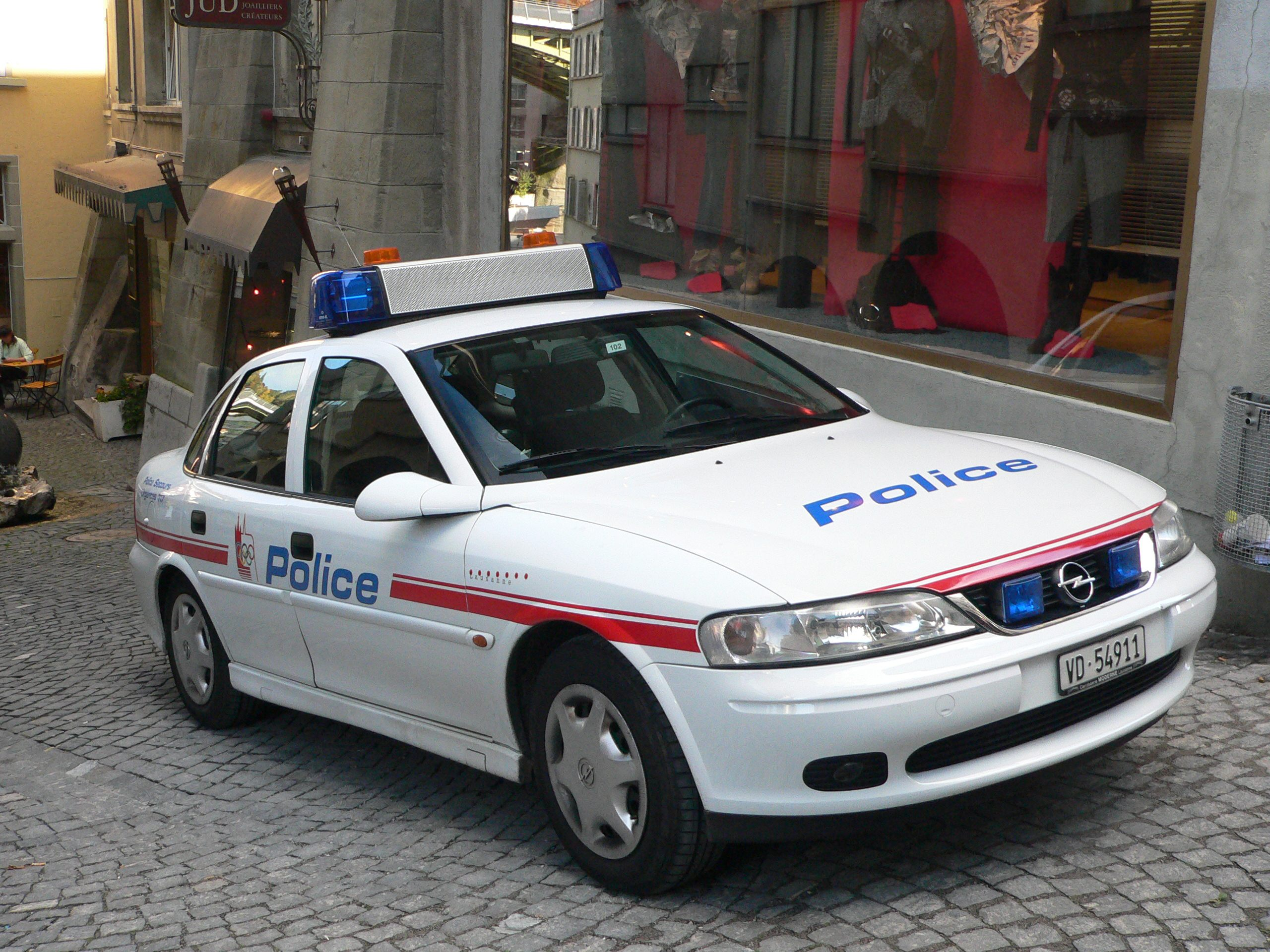
Lausanne commune police (Vaud).

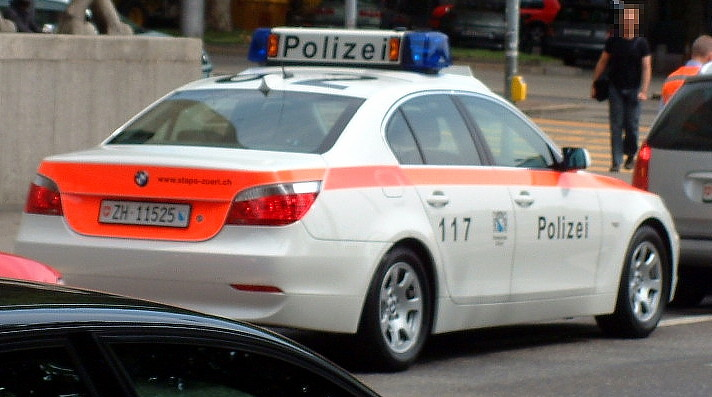
Zürich commune police (Canton of Zürich).

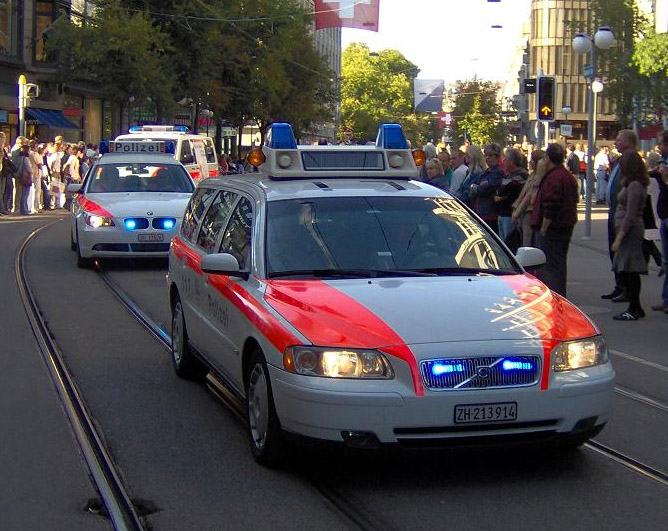
Zürich commune police (Canton of Zürich).

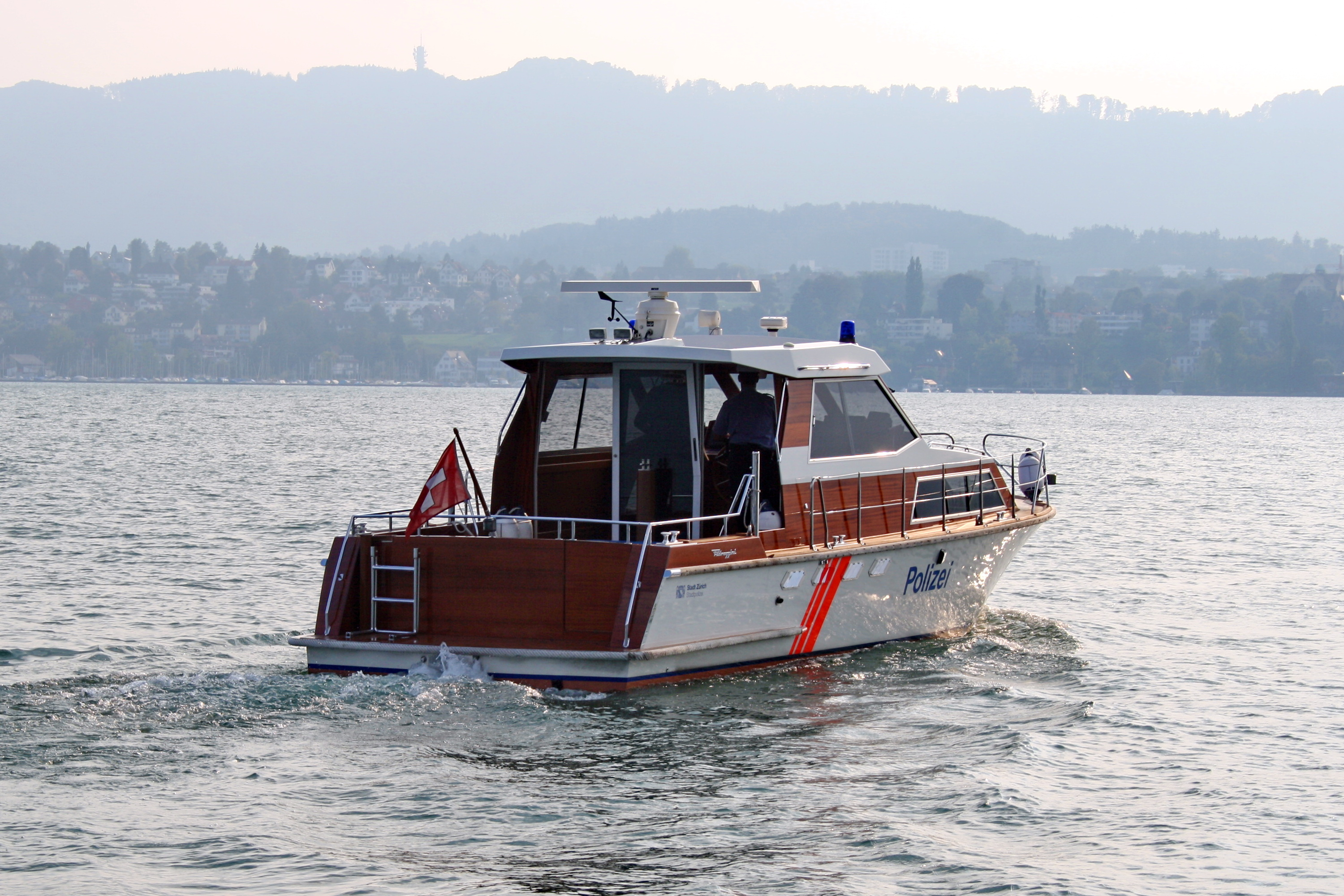
Zurigo commune police boat on Lake Zürich.

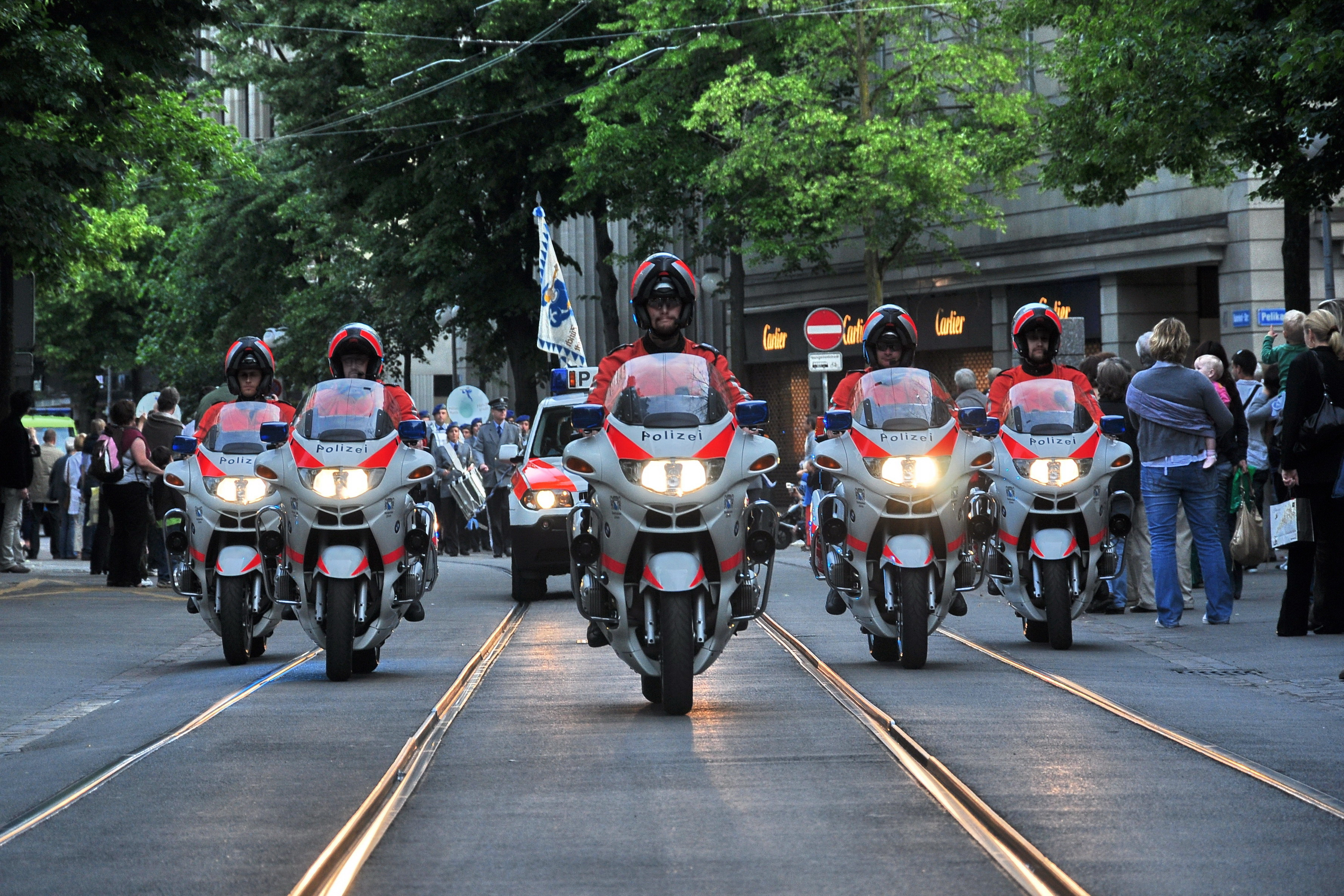
Zürich commune police parade (Canton of Zürich).

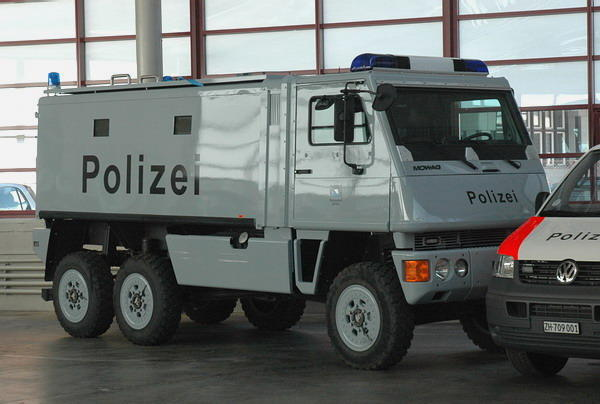
Zürich commune police Mowag Duro armoured truck (Canton of Zürich).

== See also ==
- Municipal police
