= Frantiček Klossner =

Swiss artist based in Bern (born 1960)

Frantiček Klossner (born 28 February 1960) is a Swiss artist based in Bern, known for creating video art, installations, performance, drawings and visual poetry.

== Biography ==
Frantiček Klossner trained as an artist at the F+F School for Art and Media Design Zurich (1985–1989), among whose teachers were the artists Hansjörg Mattmüller, Hermann Bohmert, Norbert Klassen, Vollrad Kutscher, Valie Export, Peter Weibel, and the philosopher Gerhard J. Lischka, and among whose guest lecturers were Jean Baudrillard, Paul Virilio, and Vilém Flusser. On graduating, he won a City of Bern art scholarship, thanks to which he was able to move into a studio in the East Village in New York City and there focus on video art, performance, and installations. He won a scholarship to the Swiss Institute in Rome in 1995 and after two years at that institution decided to settle in Rome, where he remained active as an artist until 2000. On returning to Switzerland, he headed the exhibition project Identité mobile at the Murten arteplage of the Swiss National Exhibition, Expo.02.

== Works ==
Works and groups of works by Frantiček Klossner now feature in numerous collections, among them those of the Swiss National Museum, Kunsthaus Zurich, Museum of Fine Arts Bern, Kunstmuseum Solothurn, Kunstsammlung des Kantons Bern, Kunstsammlung der Stadt Zofingen, Graphische Sammlung der Schweizerischen Nationalbibliothek, Kunstsammlung der Schweizerischen Eidgenossenschaft, Collection Banque Bonhôte Neuchâtel, Collection Ketterer-Ertle, Neuer Berliner Kunstverein, Collection Ursula Blickle, Österreichische Galerie Belvedere Vienna, Museo de Arte Moderno de Buenos Aires MAMBA Argentina, Zentrum für Kunst und Medien Karlsruhe ZKM, Collection Reinking Hamburg

== Bibliography ==
- Peter Fischer: Swiss Sculpture since 1945, Snoeck Book, Exhibition catalogue, Aargauer Kunsthaus, 2021, text by Katharina Ammann, Marianne Burki, Christoph Doswald, Peter Fischer, Franz Müller, Anouchka Panchard, Peter J. Schneemann, Simone Soldini, Walter Tschopp, ISBN 978-3-86442-354-3.
- Peter Friese: Thoughts on the Performative Installations by Franticek Klossner, in: Caerus and Chronos, Kunstverein Ruhr, Essen, NRW, Germany, 2015, ISBN 3-935420-15-3.
- Christine Breyhan: Infinite Performance, Artist Talk with Franticek Klossner, in: Kunstforum International, Band 228, Köln, Germany, 2014.
- Kathleen Bühler: His- and Herstory, in: The Weak Sex – How art pictures the new male, Museum of Fine Arts Bern, Switzerland, 2013, ISBN 978-3-906628-94-3.
- Franticek Klossner and Hans Christoph von Tavel: Curiosity successfully landed, in: Meret's Funken, Meret Oppenheim - Surrealism in contemporary art, Museum of Fine Arts Bern, Switzerland, Kerber Verlag, Bielefeld, Germany, 2012, ISBN 978-3-86678-678-3.
- Susanne Petersen: The Sleep of Reason, in: The Mirror of Narcissus - From Mythological Demigod to Mass Phenomenon, Exhibition catalogue, Taxispalais – Kunsthalle Tirol, Innsbruck, Austria, 2012, Edited by Beate Ermacora, Maren Welsch, Texts (German/English) by Julia Brennacher, Lotte Dinse, Beate Ermacora, Christian Hartard, Silvia Höller, Markus Neuwirth, Susanne Petersen, Dieter Ronte, Jürgen Tabor, Peter Weiermair, Maren Welsch, Sylvia Zwettler-Otte, Snoeck Verlagsgesellschaft Köln, Germany, ISBN 978-3-86442-030-6.
- Christoph Vögele: Compression and Illumination in the Work of Franticek Klossner, Museum of Fine Arts Solothurn, Switzerland, Verlag für moderne Kunst Nürnberg, Germany, 2008, ISBN 978-3-940748-58-4.
- Michaela Nolte: Franticek Klossner - What’s left when the head is melting, Gallery Mönch Contemporary Art, Berlin, Germany, 2006.
- Gerhard J. Lischka: Video Art Austria Germany Switzerland, ZKM Center for Art and Media Karlsruhe, Germany, 2006, ISBN 3-7757-1899-0.
- Peter Weibel: M_ARS, Art and War, Neue Galerie Graz, Universalmuseum Joanneum, Austria, Hatje Cantz Verlag, Berlin, Germany, 2003, ISBN 978-3-77571-312-2.
- Dolores Denaro: Franticek Klossner – Mess Up Your Mind, Exhibition catalogue, Kunsthaus Grenchen, 2001, Texts (German/English) by Bernhard Bischoff, Therese Bhattacharya Stettler, Léonard Cuénoud, Dolores Denaro, Sandra Gianfreda, Norberto Gramaccini, Manfred Hochmeister, Regula J. Kopp, Gerhard Johann Lischka, Gwendolyn Masin, Gian Paolo Minelli, Victorine Müller, Claudia Rosiny, Toni Stooss, David Streiff, Christine Szakacs, Marc Traber, Annelise Zwez, ISBN 3-90674-704-2.

== Exhibitions ==
=== Solo exhibitions (selection) ===
- 2018: Eudemonia and Ataraxia, Gallery Da Mihi, Bern, Switzerland
- 2015: Kunstverein Ruhr, Essen, North Rhine-Westphalia, NRW, Germany
- 2014: Centre for Contemporary Art, Wil/St. Gallen, Switzerland
- 2013: Center for the Arts, Interlaken, Switzerland
- 2012: Edition Multiple, Berne, Switzerland
- 2008: Museum of Fine Arts Solothurn, Switzerland
- 2007: Centro de Expresiones Contemporaneas, Rosario, Argentina
- 2006: Gallery Mönch Contemporary Art, Berlin, Germany
- 2005: Centro de Arte, Santiago de Cuba
- 2004: Buenos Aires Museum of Modern Art, Argentina
- 2003: Museum of Cultural History, Görlitz, Germany
- 2002: Centre for Contemporary Art, Bellinzona, Switzerland
- 2001: Centre for Contemporary Art, Grenchen, Switzerland

=== Collective exhibitions (selection) ===
- 2018: Art and sustainability, Mobiliar Art Center, Bern, Switzerland
- 2018: Mosaic, Gallery Mayhaus, Erlach, Switzerland
- 2018: Fields of Disappearance, Foundation BINZ, Zurich, Switzerland
- 2017: Writing Pictures, Biennial Plakartive 17, Bielefeld, Germany
- 2017: Erotika, Gallery Mayhaus, Erlach, Switzerland
- 2017: Self-Perception in the Digital Age, Centre for Contemporary Art, Zofingen, Switzerland
- 2017: In Visible Limits, Centre for Contemporary Art, Rapperswil-Jona, Switzerland
- 2016: Lumière d’hiver, Foundation Von Rütte, Biel, Switzerland
- 2016: In Visible Limits, Centre for the Arts, Interlaken, Switzerland
- 2016: In Visible Limits, Centre for Contemporary Art, Aschaffenburg, Germany
- 2016: Vis-À-Vis, Contemporary Arts Center Bourbaki, Lucerne, Switzerland
- 2016: Danse Macabre, Museum of Communication, Berne, Switzerland
- 2016: In Visible Limits, Centre for Contemporary Art, Constance, Allemagne
- 2015: Hold the Line, Gallery Mönch Contemporary Art, Berlin, Germany
- 2015: L'immagine di sé, Villa Croce, Museum of Contemporary Art, Genoa, Italy
- 2015: Fragile, Contemporary Art Gallery C, Neuchâtel, Switzerland
- 2014: Existential Visual Worlds, Museum of Modern Art Weserburg, Bremen, Germany
- 2014: Artists’ Books, Prints and Drawings Department, Swiss National Library
- 2014: Performative Video Art, Galerija G12HUB, Belgrade, Serbia
- 2014: Des hommes et la forêt, Museum Château de Nyon, Switzerland
- 2013: Art Pictures the New Male, Museum of Fine Arts Bern, Switzerland
- 2013: The Way We Were, Gallery Zilberman, Istanbul, Turkey
- 2013: Feu Sacré, Museum of Fine Arts Bern, Switzerland
- 2012: The Mirror of Narcissus, Contemporary Arts Center Taxispalais, Innsbruck, Austria
- 2012: The pictured self, Cercle Artistic de Sant Lluc, Barcelone, Spain
- 2012: Swiss Video Art, Espacio Trapézio, Madrid, Spain
- 2011: Bodies, Collection Reinking, Kunsthalle Osnabrück, Germany
- 2010: Afterpiece, Performance Art on Video, Gallery Claudia Groeflin, Zurich, Switzerland
- 2007: Collection Ketterer-Ertle, Museum of Fine Arts Appenzell, Switzerland
- 2006: Villa Jelmini, Memorial Exhibition for Harald Szeemann, Kunsthalle Bern, Switzerland
- 2005: The Bust since Auguste Rodin, Städtische Museen Heilbronn, Germany
- 2004: Just as Things Are, Hartware Medienkunstverien, Dortmund, Germany
- 2003: Art and War, M_ARS, Neue Galerie Graz, Joanneum, Austria
- 2002: Change of Scene, Museum of Fine Arts Solothurn, Switzerland
- 2001: Innovation and Tradition, The Swiss Mobiliar Art Collection, Berne, Switzerland
- 2000: Styria Expo, Graz, Austria
- 2000: Ice Age, Museum of Fine Arts Bern, Switzerland
- 1999: Art Award Böttcherstrasse, Kunsthalle Bremen, Germany
- 1999: Solothurn Film Festival, Switzerland
- 1999: Biennale Internationale du film sur l’art, Centre Georges-Pompidou, Paris, France
- 1998: Voi siete qui, Villa Maraini, Swiss Institute in Rome, Italy
- 1997: Los Angeles Gay and Lesbian Film Festival, California, USA
- 1997: The 19th Tokyo Video Festival, Tokyo, Japan
- 1996: Video Art in Europe, Statens Museum for Kunst, Copenhagen, Denmark
- 1994: Swiss Video Art, Kunsthaus Langenthal, Switzerland
- 1993: Aeschlimann Corti Award, Arts Centre Pasquart, Biel, Switzerland
- 1990: Young European Artists, Hannover Messe, Germany
