= Sequential (disambiguation) =

Sequential is a concept in mathematics.

It may also mean:

- Sequential manual transmission, an automotive transmission technology
- Sequention, a sequentional logic function
- Sequential (company), an American synthesizer company
- Sequential color scheme, for coloring data with a minimum and maximum

== See also ==
- Sequence (disambiguation)
