= Hans Werner Zbinden =

Swiss physician and anthroposophist

- Born: October 14, 1899; Basel, Switzerland
- Died: May 23, 1977 (aged 77); Zurich, Switzerland
- Occupation: Physician
- Known for: Co-founder of Zurich Steiner School
- Spouse: Olga Knöpfel (m. 1926)

Hans Werner Zbinden (14 October 1899 – 23 May 1977) was a Swiss physician and anthroposophist. He was a co-founder of the Steiner School in Zurich and a prominent figure in the anthroposophical movement in Switzerland.

== Early life and education ==
Zbinden was born on 14 October 1899 in Basel, the son of Rudolf Gottlieb Zbinden, a printer, and Lydia Theresia Stürchler. He was a citizen of Basel and Albligen (now part of Schwarzenburg). He attended gymnasium and studied medicine in Basel, earning his doctorate in 1927. During his studies, he took courses in medicine with Rudolf Steiner.

== Career ==
Zbinden worked as a family physician in Zurich from the time he completed his studies until his death in 1977. In 1926, he co-founded the Steiner School in Zurich, where he served as school physician and taught anthropology. From 1935, he was one of four members of the directing committee of the medical section of the School of Spiritual Science at the Goetheanum. In 1943, he joined the committee of the society founded to administer Steiner's estate following Steiner's death in 1925. He was involved in the succession dispute between this society and the Goetheanum, advocating for respect of Steiner's testamentary provisions. He was a co-founder of Rudolf Steiner Editions and authored writings on anthroposophical medicine.

== Personal life ==
In 1926, Zbinden married Olga Knöpfel, daughter of Johann Jakob Knöpfel. They had 4 children, including Hans-Ulrich Zbinden. He died on 23 May 1977 in Zurich.

== Bibliography ==
- Mitteilungen aus der anthroposophischen Bewegung, 2007, no. 122
