= Sequin (disambiguation) =

Sequin may refer to:

- Sequin, a disk shaped bead
- Sequin (coin)
- Séquin, a family name
- Sequins (film), a 2004 French film titled Brodeuses in France
- Sequin and Knobel Swiss architects active in 1907.
- Sequin (d. bef. 1650), a grand sachem of the Wangunk,
