= Sequin and Knobel =

Sequin and Knobel, or Séquin and Knobel, were a Swiss firm of architects notable for the design of industrial building such as cotton mills and weaving sheds. It was formed in 1895. The partners were Carl Arnold Séquin and Hilarius Knobel. Together they were responsible for over 250 industrial buildings.

== Partners ==
Carl Arnold Séquin-Bronner (born 25 January 1845 in Uznach; died 25 November 1899 in Rüti ZH).

Hilarius Knobel (born 1854 Glarus; died 1921 Zürich) was the son of the architect, Hilarius Knobel (born 4 February 1830 in Schwändi; died 25 February 1891 in Zürich) who was practising in Zürich in 1859.

== Buildings ==
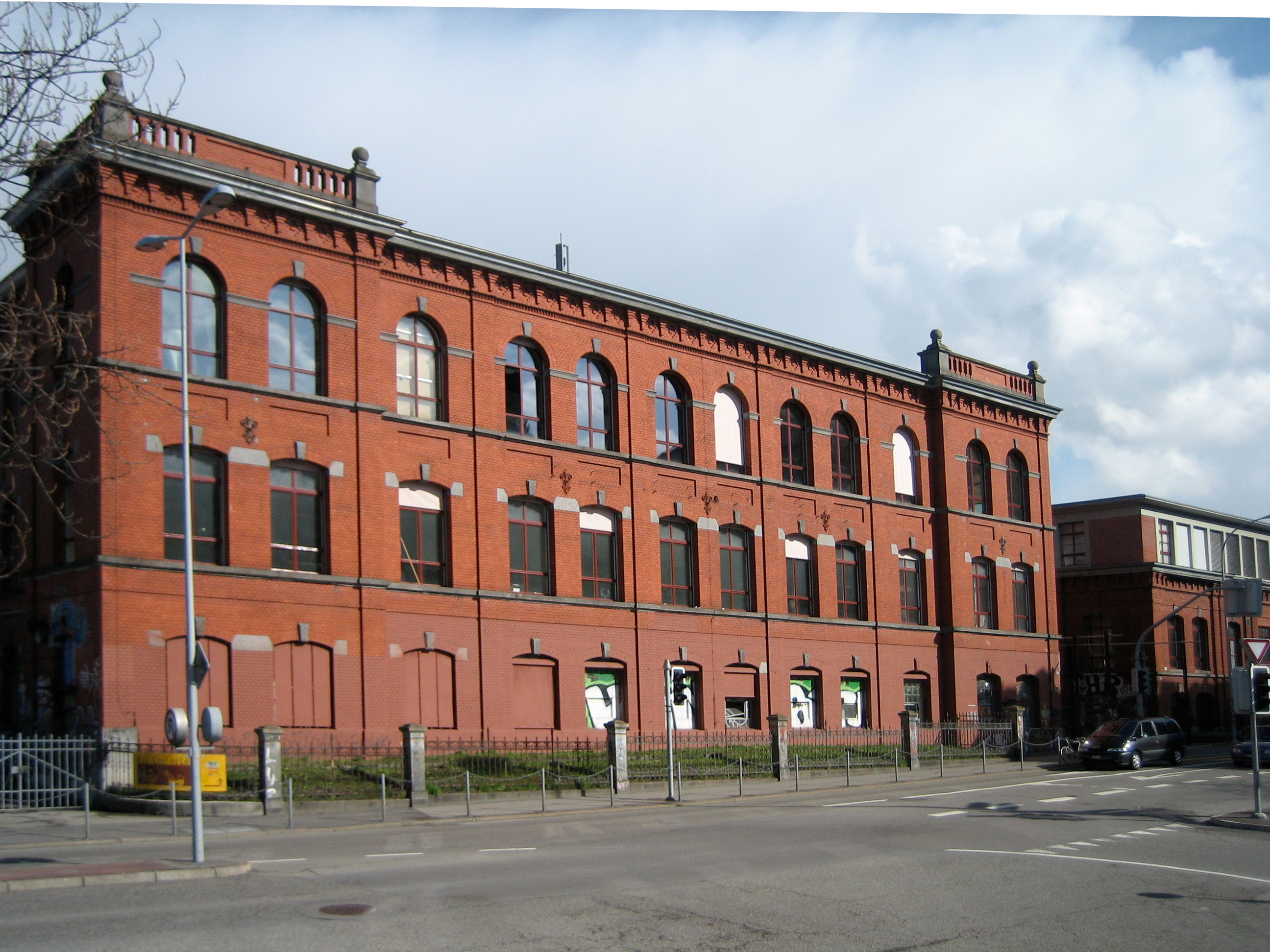
Rote Fabrik, built in 1892

- Mechanische Baumwollspinnerei und Weberei Augsburg (TIM) In 1895/98 they extended the existing factory, by the Proviantbach in Augsburg, adding a weaving shed for 640 automatic looms and a four storey spinning mill containing 42 000 spindles.
- Die Rote Fabrik am Zürichsee (Zürich-Wollishofen)
- Kammgarn Fabriksgebäude Spinnereistraße 10 in Hard, Vorarlberg (Note: Fabriksgebäude, Austrian Denkmal ObjektID: 22712, Spinnereistraße 10, Hard, Vorarlberg, Austria: Vorarlberger Kammgarnspinnerei, Fabriksgebäude built from a plan drawn up by C. Sequin, 1896, extended in 1909 by Josef Schöch; single storey steel framed pinning mill.)
