= Mechanische Baumwollspinnerei und Weberei Augsburg =

Cotton mill in Augsburg, Bavaria, Germany

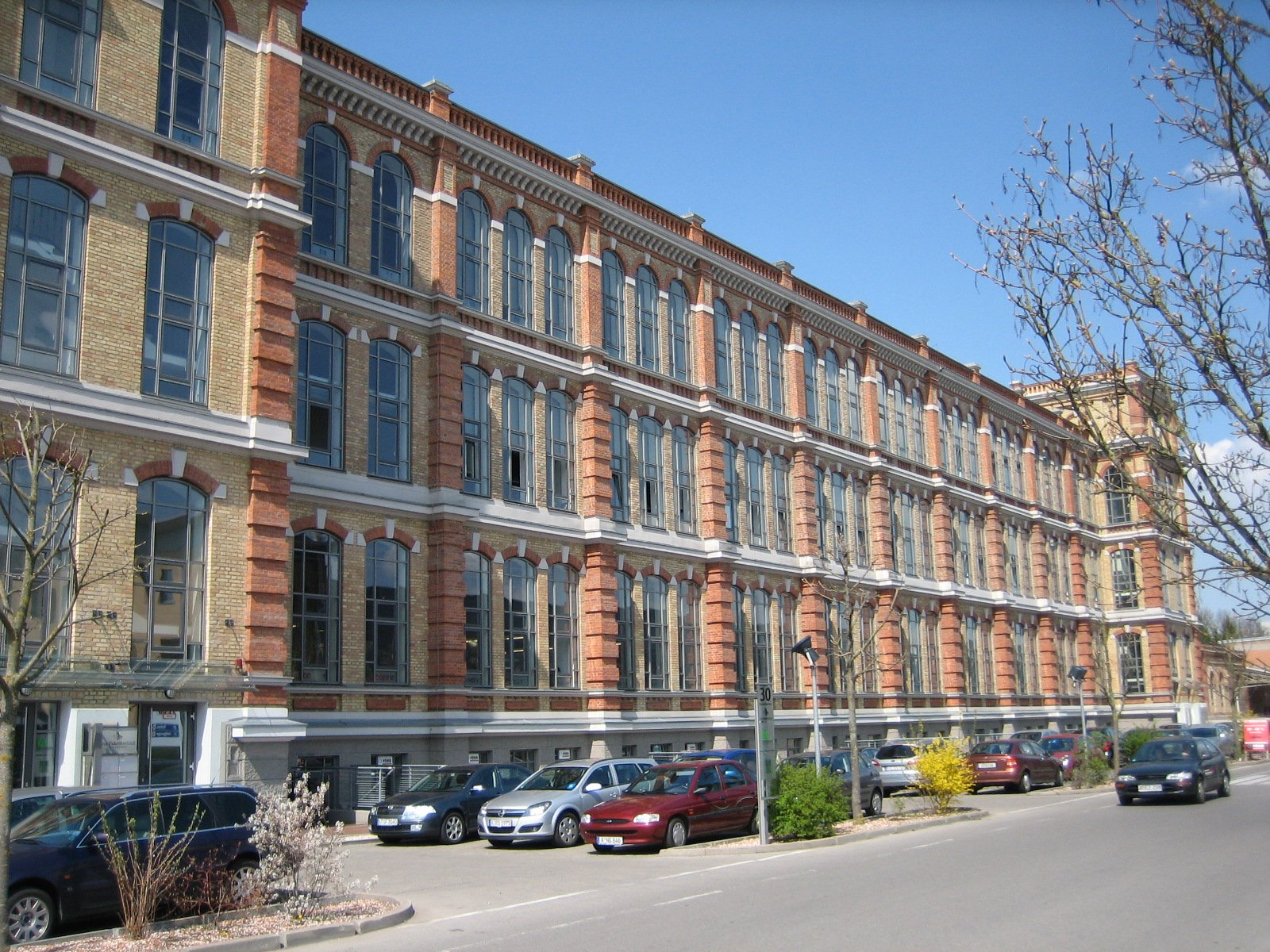
The east side of the factory

The Mechanische Baumwollspinnerei und Weberei (English: Mechanical cotton spinning and weaving mill) is a cotton mill in Augsburg, Bavaria, Germany. It was founded in 1837 and was considered one of the oldest textile manufacturing companies in Germany. It was closed in 1989.
