= Josef Estermann =

Swiss philosopher and theologian

Josef Estermann (born 1956) is a Swiss philosopher and theologian, known for his studies in the domain of interculturality, indigenous philosophies and theologies of Abya Yala, and the Andean worldview.

== Biography ==
Estermann was born in 1956 in Sursee, in the canton of Lucerne, Switzerland. He completed his studies in theology and philosophy in Switzerland and the Netherlands, completing the doctoral degree in philosophy at the University of Utrect with a thesis on Leibniz.

From 1990 to 1998, Estermann served as a missionary, working with Sociedad Misionera de Belén (SMB) in Cusco, Peru. During this period, his interests shifted to autochthonous cultures and worldviews of the Andean region.

From 1998 to 2003, Estermann served as director of the Institute for Missionology.

From 2004 to 2012, Estermann worked in La Paz, Bolivia as an investigator for the Instituto Superior Ecuménico Andino de Teología (ISEAT), a major university in San Andreas. In this period, Estermann devoted his investigations to Andean philosophy and theology, researching and developing intercultural methodologies for religious and philosophical sciences.

Since 2013, Estermann has served as the director of RomeroHaus in Lucerne and docent at the University of Lucerne.

== Thought ==
While Estermann was trained in occidental thought, he soon came to be interested in non-European philosophy, especially the philosophies of Latin American peoples. In this evolution, works of Emmanuel Lévinas and Johann Baptist Metz were decisive. Beginning in the 1990s, Estermann devoted his attention primarily to indigenous knowledges of Latin America.

Estermann is a proponent of Andean Philosophy (Filosofía Andina), a philosophical form of thought indigenous to Andean villages of the Abya Yala. His investigations of Andean philosophy apply methods and philosophical approaches of intercultural philosophy as well as linguistics, cultural anthropology and history.

== Bibliography ==
- “Filosofía Andina: Estudio Intercultural de la Sabiduría Autóctona”. Quito, 1998.
- “Teología Andina: Antología”. La Paz, 2005.
- “Filosofía Andina: Sabiduría indígena para un mundo nuevo”. La Paz, 2006.
- “Si el Sur fuera el Norte: Chakanas interculturales entre Andes y Occidente”. La Paz y Quito, 2008.
- “Interculturalidad: Vivir la diversidad”. La Paz: ISEAT, 2009.
- “Compendio de la Filosofía Occidental en Perspectiva Intercultural”. En 5 tomos, La Paz, 2011. (T 1: Introducción al Pensamiento Filosófico; T 2: Filosofía Antigua y Medieval; T 3: Filosofía Moderna; T 4: Filosofía Contemporánea; T 5: Filosofía Sistemática).
- “Cruz y Coca: Hacia la descolonización de la Religión y la Teología”. La Paz, 2013.
