= Züri brännt (film) =

- Directed by: Markus Sieber, Ronnie Wahli, Marcel Müller, Thomas Krempke
- Release date: 1981
- Country: Switzerland
- Language: Swiss German

Züri brännt (titled Züri brännt in English) is a 1981 Swiss documentary film directed by the Swiss filmmakers Markus Sieber, Ronnie Wahli, Marcel Müller, Thomas Krempke. Beginning on 22 January 2015, the film was shown during the Solothurn Film Festival as one of the milestones of Swiss film history.

== Background ==
Züri brännt or Opernhauskrawalle, literally meaning "Zürich is burning", is the Swiss German term generally used for the youth protests in May 1980 in the Swiss city of the same name, in the canton of Zürich. Violent protests against extremely high cultural subsidies by the city which had also neglected alternative governmental cultural programs for Zürich's youth, occurred in 1980 during the so-called Opernhauskrawall, or the Zürich Opera House riots. The protests took place on 30/31 May 1980 at the Sechseläutenplatz square in Zürich, but also throughout the whole city, spreading to other municipalities of Switzerland in 1980 and again in 1981. These protests marked the beginning of the alternative youth movement in Switzerland. A first political compromise was the establishment of the AJZ (a short-lived alternative youth centre at the Zürich main station), and the opening of the Rote Fabrik alternative cultural centre in Wollishofen in late 1980. Rote Fabrik still exists, and claims to be one of the most important alternative cultural venues in the greater Zürich urban area. The most prominent politician involved in these developments was Emilie Lieberherr, then member of the city's executive (Stadtrat) authorities.

The documentary was based on the original black and white material filmed at the locations of the youth protests in May 1980 and afterwards. It first aired on Swiss television SRF in May 2014.

== Festivals ==
- Solothurn Film Festival 2015
