= Zurich Opera House =

Opera house in Switzerland

- Opernhaus Zürich
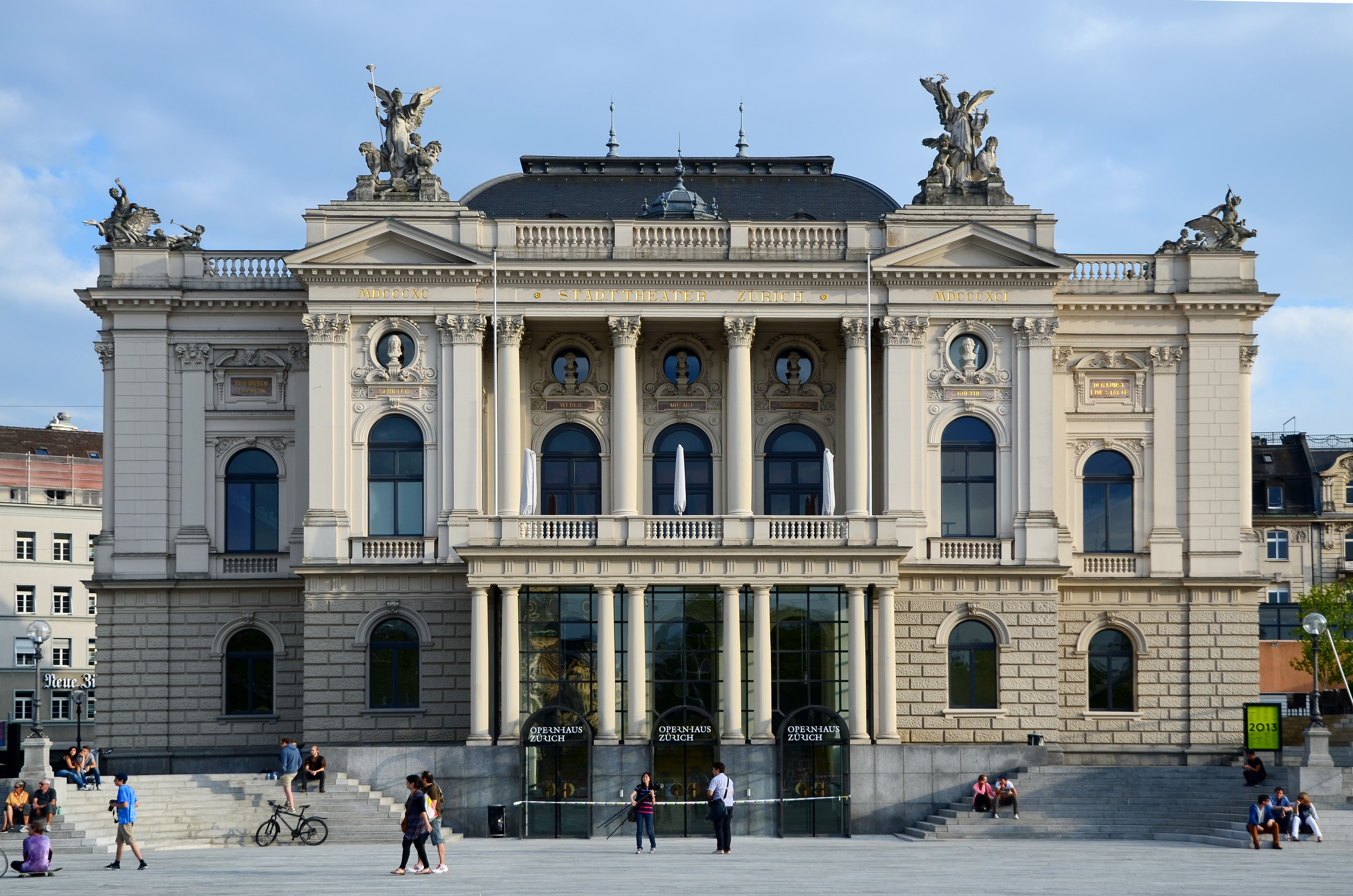
- Zurich Opera House in 2019
- Interactive map of Zurich Opera House
- Address: Sechseläutenplatz 1 Zurich; Switzerland
- Coordinates: 47°21′54″N 8°32′49″E
- Type: Opera house

Website
- www.opernhaus.ch

The Zurich Opera House (German: Opernhaus Zürich) is an opera house in the Swiss city of Zurich. Located at the Sechseläutenplatz, it has been the home of the Zurich Opera since 1891, and also houses the Bernhard-Theater Zürich. It is also home to Ballett Zürich.

It received the "Opera Company of the Year" award at the 2014 International Opera Awards.

== History ==
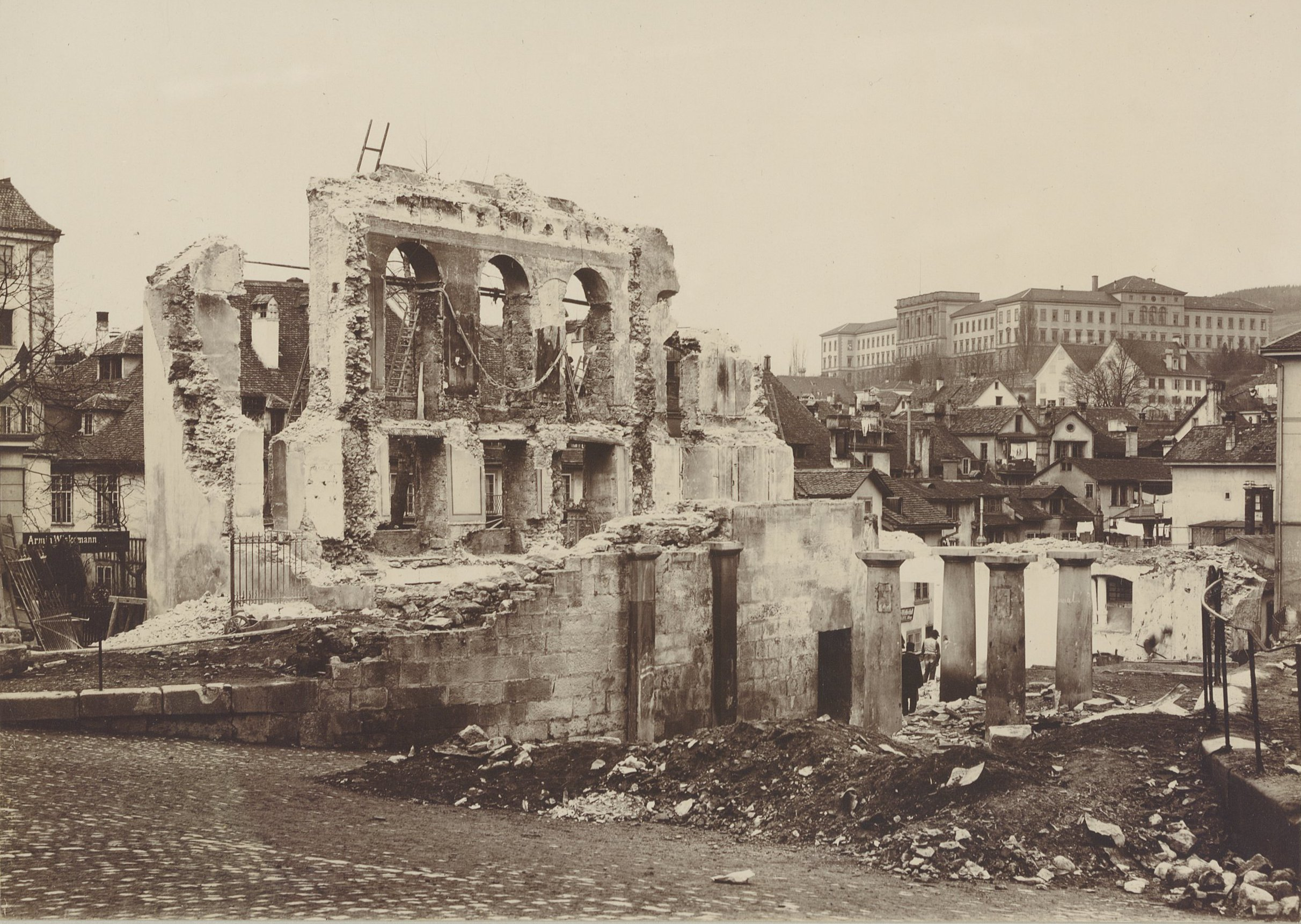
Ruins of the Aktientheater after the fire of 1890

The first permanent theatre in Zurich, the Aktientheater, was built in 1834 and it became the focus of Richard Wagner’s activities during his period of exile from Germany.

The Aktientheater burnt down in 1890. The new Stadttheater Zürich (municipal theatre) was built by the Viennese architects Fellner & Helmer, who changed their previous design for the theatre in Wiesbaden only slightly. It was built in only 16 months and was opened in 1891 and became the first opera house in Europe to have electrical lighting.

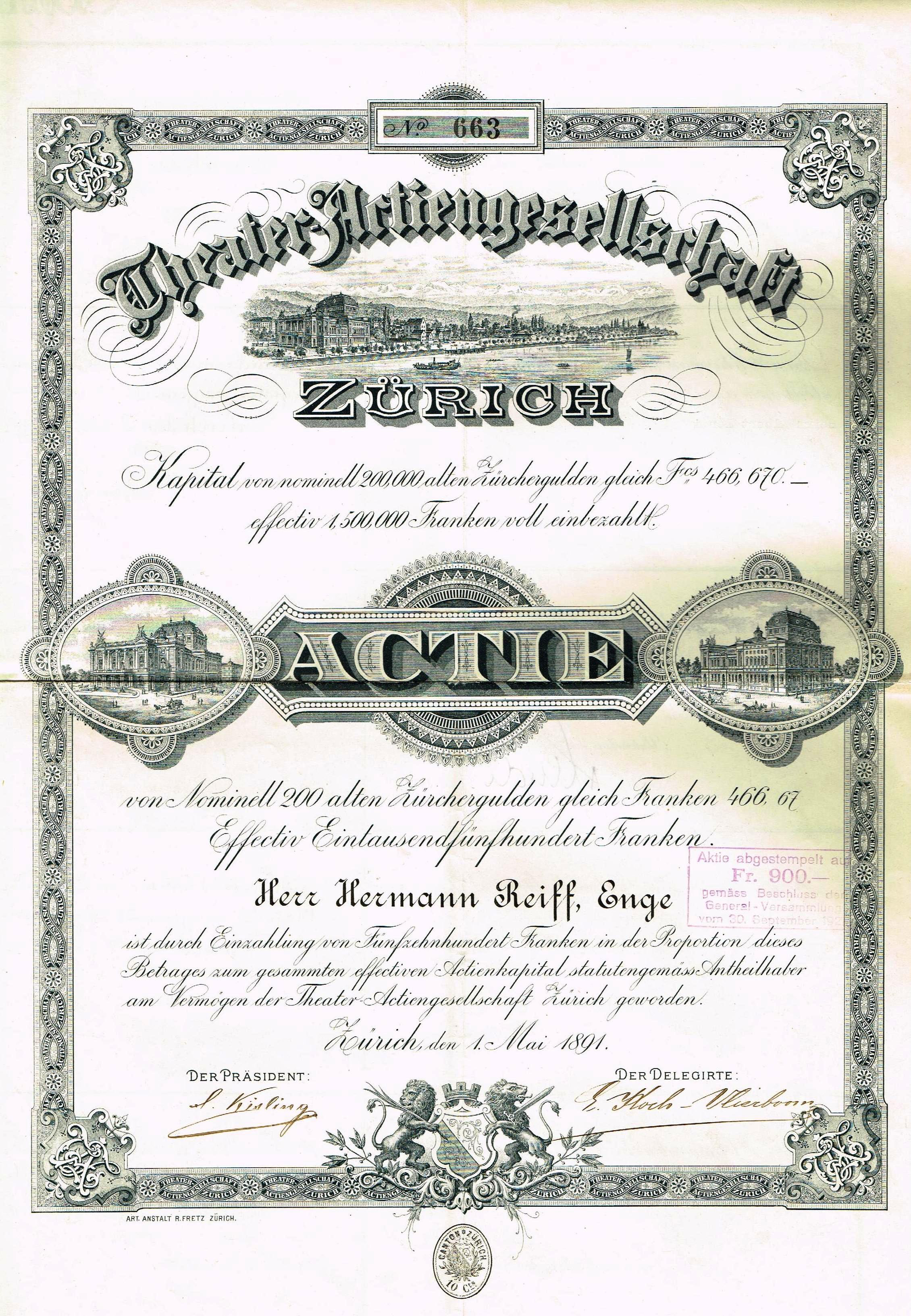
Share of the Theater-Actiengesellschaft Zürich, issued 1. May 1891

It was the city's main performance space for drama, opera, and musical events until 1925, when the Bernhard Theater was built for separate plays. Opening in 1941, the Esplanada building was demolished in May 1981, and the present adjoint building opened on 27/28 December 1984 after three years of transition in the department store building at the nearby Schanzengraben. The original theatre was renamed Opernhaus Zürich in 1964.

By the 1970s, the opera house was badly in need of major renovations; when some considered it not worth restoring, a new theatre was proposed for the site. However, between 1982 and 1984, preceded by the opposing Opernhauskrawalle (opera house riots), rebuilding took place. The rebuilt theatre was inaugurated with Wagner’s Die Meistersinger von Nürnberg and the world première of Rudolf Kelterborn’s Chekhov opera Der Kirschgarten.

As restored, the theatre is an ornate building with a neo-classical façade of white and grey stone adorned with busts of Weber, Wagner, and Mozart. Additionally, busts of Schiller, Shakespeare, and Goethe are to be found. The auditorium is built in the neo-rococo style and seats approximately 1100 people.

Corporate archives and historical library collections are held at the music department of the Predigerkirche Zürich.

The Opera House also holds concerts by its Philharmonia orchestra, matinees, Lieder evenings and events for children.

== Opera Studio ==
The Zurich Opera House is also home of the International Opera Studio (Internationales Opernstudio IOS) which is an educational program for young singers and pianists. The studio was created in 1961 and has renowned artists teaching such as Brigitte Fassbaender, Hedwig Fassbender, Andreas Homoki, and Eytan Pessen.

== Youth protests of 1980 ==
In response to the combination of high subsidies for the Opera and the lack of cultural programs for the youth in Zurich, large protests were held in May 1980. The protests became known as the Opernhauskrawalle youth protests – Züri brännt, meaning Zurich is burning, as documented in the 1981 Swiss documentary film of the same name.

== Financing ==
Opernhaus Zürich AG is organised pursuant to Swiss law as a Aktiengesellschaft (share company) and it operates a music theatre and ballet under the authority of Canton of Zurich that has been providing the main funding since 1995. Swiss bank UBS as well as Rolex are partners of Opernhaus Zürich AG.
