= Opernhauskrawalle =

1980s youth movement in Switzerland

Opernhauskrawalle (Opera House riots) is the Swiss German term generally used for the youth protests at the end of May 1980 in the Swiss city of Zürich, a municipality in the Canton of Zürich. Also called Züri brännt ("Zürich is burning"), these events marked the 'rebirth' of the alternative youth movement in Switzerland in the 1980s.

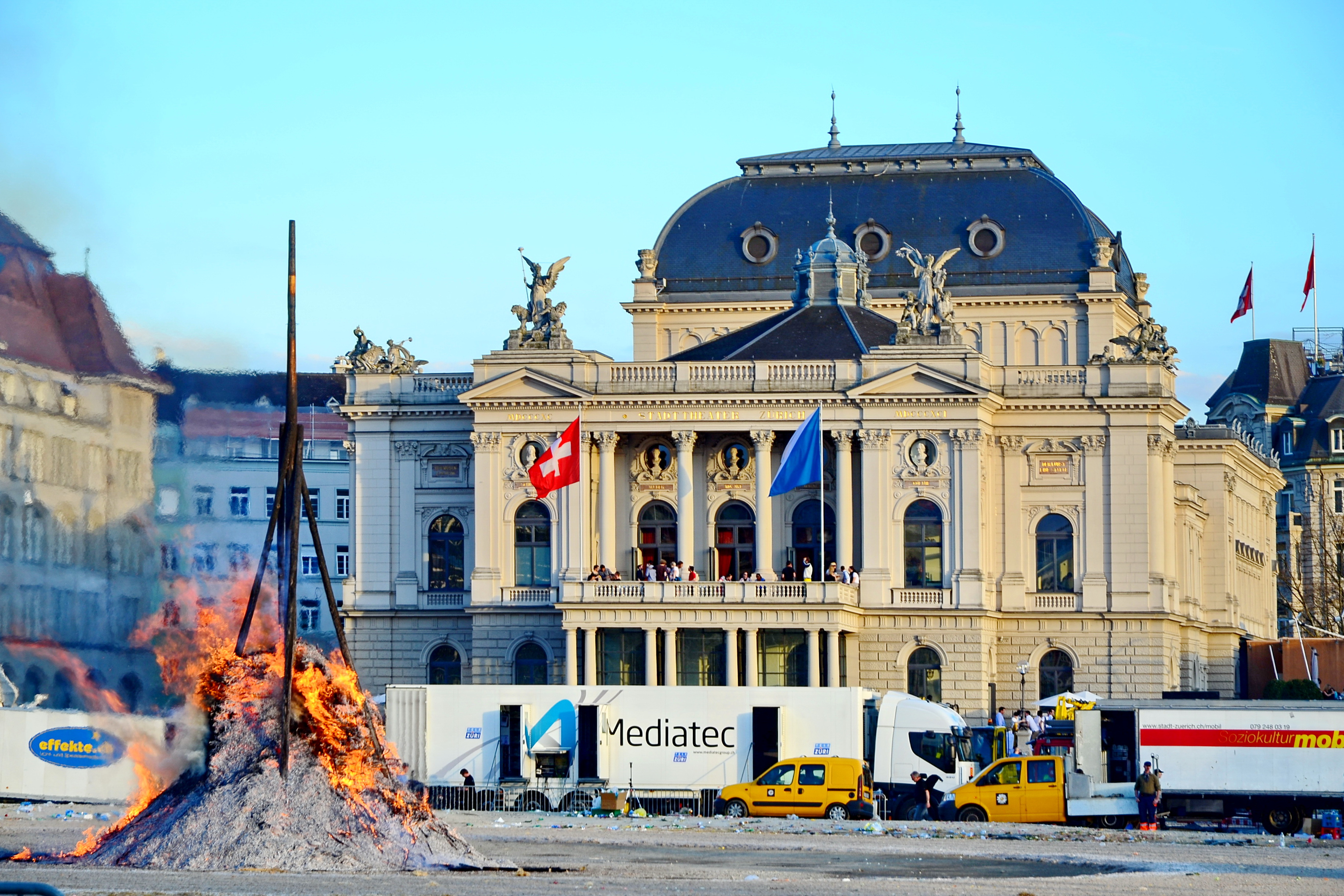
Burning of the so-called Böögg on occasion of Sechseläuten in 2013, not the youth protests but the same site at Sechseläutenplatz.

== Background ==
A three-day celebration of the Zürich Opernhaus and the opening of a festival was celebrated on 30 May 1980. Uninvited, about 200 protesters crashed the festival opening and demanded an autonomous youth center. The communal Stadtpolizei Zürich and state Kantonspolizei Zürich police corps were informed beforehand and were stationed in the foyer of the opera house as a precautionary measure. As the youths occupied the exterior stairs of the opera house, the demonstration degenerated into a street battle between demonstrators and the police, who were equipped with water cannons, tear gas, and rubber bullets. The youth protests culminated on 30/31 May 1980, at the present Sechseläutenplatz square in Zürich, but later spread throughout the whole city. A public referendum also contributed to the riots, as the city of Zurich planned to grant CHF 61 million for a renovation and an extension of the opera house, but nothing for the planned Rote Fabrik cultural center in Zürich-Wollishofen, on the other side of the Zürichsee lakeshore.

The protestors felt that the demands of the young people for their own cultural center had been ignored for years and that the astronomical grant for the opera house demonstrated this lack of commitment to youth by Zürich's conservative government. Their reaction was a "long pent-up anger," as seen on a newspaper headline. "Züri brännt" has since become a household word, and is the title of a punk song by the band TNT. Andreas Homoki, director of the opera house, described the situation in the "hot summer of 1980" as explosive, and that "there was not enough room for a youth culture" because of a lack of alternative governmental cultural programs for the youth in Zürich.

From 1976 to 1989, the Criminal Police Department III (KK III), i.e. the State Security Department of the Zürich City Police, kept a file of photos under the title "Schmieren/Kleben" (literally: smearing/glueing). Without these intensive collection activities, which the police engaged in especially in the late 1970s and around 1980, these images would have disappeared long ago. After the so-called Fichenskandal and its treatment at the city government level by a parliamentary commission of inquiry, the photos landed in the city archive in 1993. The photos, published in book form in April 2018, document the fear of left-wing extremist activities during those years, along the lines of the German RAF, the rise of the punk movement, early works of the Sprayer von Zürich, followed by the slogans of the Zürich youth unrest. While the police focused on possibly subversive messages and the documentation of damage to property, these photos also captured everyday street scenes.

These factors contributed to the so-called Opernhauskrawall, meaning riots or youth protests at the Zürich Opera House. The youth protests, beginning with this one in Zurich in 1980 and continuing throughout 1980 and again in 1982, mark the beginning of the modern youth movement in Switzerland, generating interest in alternative youth culture and a revival of the former hippie movement.

== Aftermath ==
A first political compromise was the so-called AJZ (a temporary youth centre at the Zürich central station), and the establishment of the Rote Fabrik alternative cultural centre in Wollishofen in late 1980. Rote Fabrik still exists, and is known as one of the most important alternative cultural venues in the greater Zürich urban area. The most prominent politicians involved were Sigmund Widmer and Emilie Lieberherr, then member of the city's executive (Stadtrat) authorities. The Swiss newspaper WOZ Die Wochenzeitung reported in a 2006 expose that an undercover police officer infiltrated the protest groups in 1980; in October 2016 a book about Willi S's double life as revoluzzer and police officer was published.

== The youth protests in Swiss culture ==
Swiss federal TV hosted a "CH-Magazin" live TV debate on 15 July 1980 between the Zürich city executives Emilie Lieberherr and Hans Frick (LdU), police commander Rolf Bertschi, local SP leader Leonhard Fünfschilling, and two representatives of the youth movement. In an act of reverse psychology, the two youth representatives dressed in conservative attire posed as the Swiss equivalents of John Doe and Jane Doe, "Anna Müller" (Hayat Jamal Aldin, sister of Samir Jamal Aldin) and "Hans Müller" (Fredi Meier). They surprised the others with shocking demands like that the police use napalm instead of mere tear gas against the youth movement. Neither TV hosts nor officials could handle the abrupt situation, and the broadcast is considered one of Switzerland's biggest media scandals.

Zürich brännt, a Swiss documentary film based on video footage from 1980, was filmed in black and white at the locations of the youth protests in May 1980 and afterwards. It was aired on the Swiss television network SRF in May 2014. Beginning on 22 January 2015, the film was shown during the Solothurn Film Festival as one of the milestones in Swiss film history.

== Literature ==
- Peter Bichsel; Silvan Lerch: Autonomie auf A4. Wie die Zürcher Jugendbewegung Zeichen setzte. Flugblätter 1979-82. Limmat Verlag, Zürich 2017. ISBN 978-3-85791-833-9
- Heinz Nigg: Wir wollen alles, und zwar subito! Die Achtziger Jugendunruhen in der Schweiz und ihre Folgen. Limmat Verlag, Zürich 2001. ISBN 3 857913754
- Heinz Nigg: The Video Movement of the 1970s and 1980s. London Bern Lausanne Basel Zurich. Scheidegger & Spiess, Zurich 2017. ISBN 978-3-85881-801-0
- Christian Koller: Vor 40 Jahren: Züri brännt, in: Sozialarchiv Info 1 (2020).
- Tanja Polli: Das Doppelleben des Polizisten Willy S.: Erinnerungen an die Zeit, als Zürich brannte. Orell Füssli, Zürich. ISBN 978-3037630686.
- Philipp Anz, Jules Spinatsch, Viola Zimmermann: Schmieren/Kleben. Aus dem Archiv KKIII der Stadtpolizei Zürich 1976 - 1989. Edition Patrick Frey, Zürich 2018. ISBN 978-3-906803-61-6.
