= Leimbach (Zürich) =

Quarter of the city of Zurich, Switzerland

- Quarter
- Flag Coat of arms

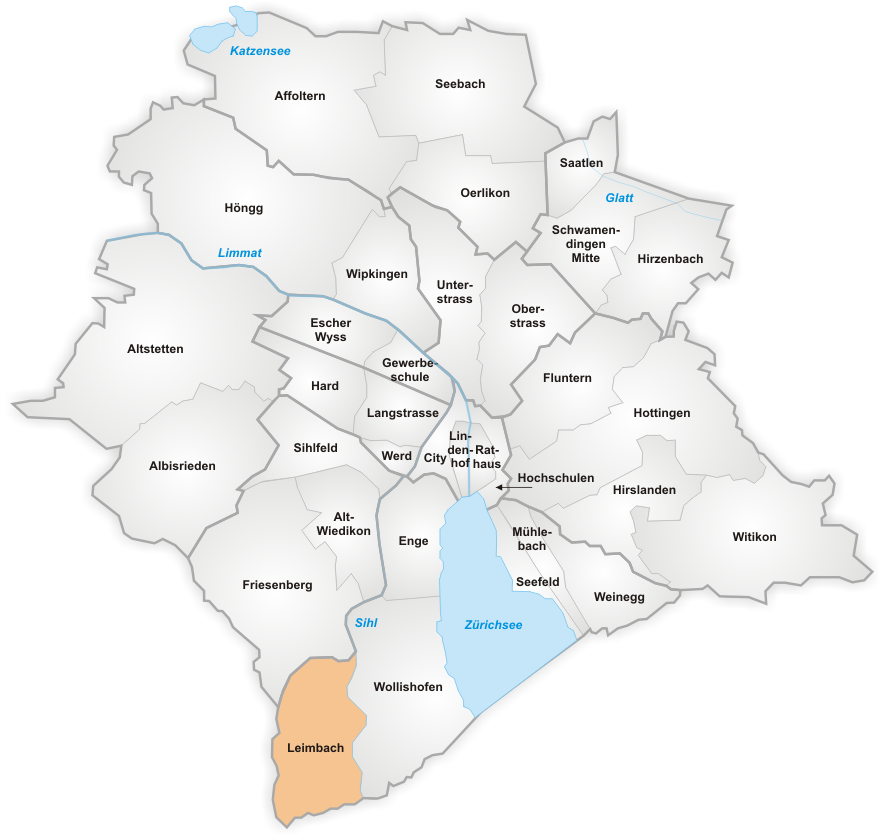
- The quarter of Leimbach in Zurich
- Coordinates: 47°19′57″N 8°30′52″E
- Country: Switzerland
- Canton: Zurich
- City: Zurich
- District: 2

Leimbach (German: [ˈlaɪmbax]) is a quarter in the district 2 in Zürich. It is located in the lower Sihl Valley (Sihltal).

It was formerly a municipality of its own, having been incorporated into Zürich in 1893. The quarter has a population of 6,415 as of 2025 and is distributed over an area of 2.92 km^{2} (1.13 sq mi).

== Transportation ==
Zürich Leimbach railway station is a stop of the Zürich S-Bahn on the line S4. It is a 10-minute ride from Zürich Hauptbahnhof.

== Gallery ==
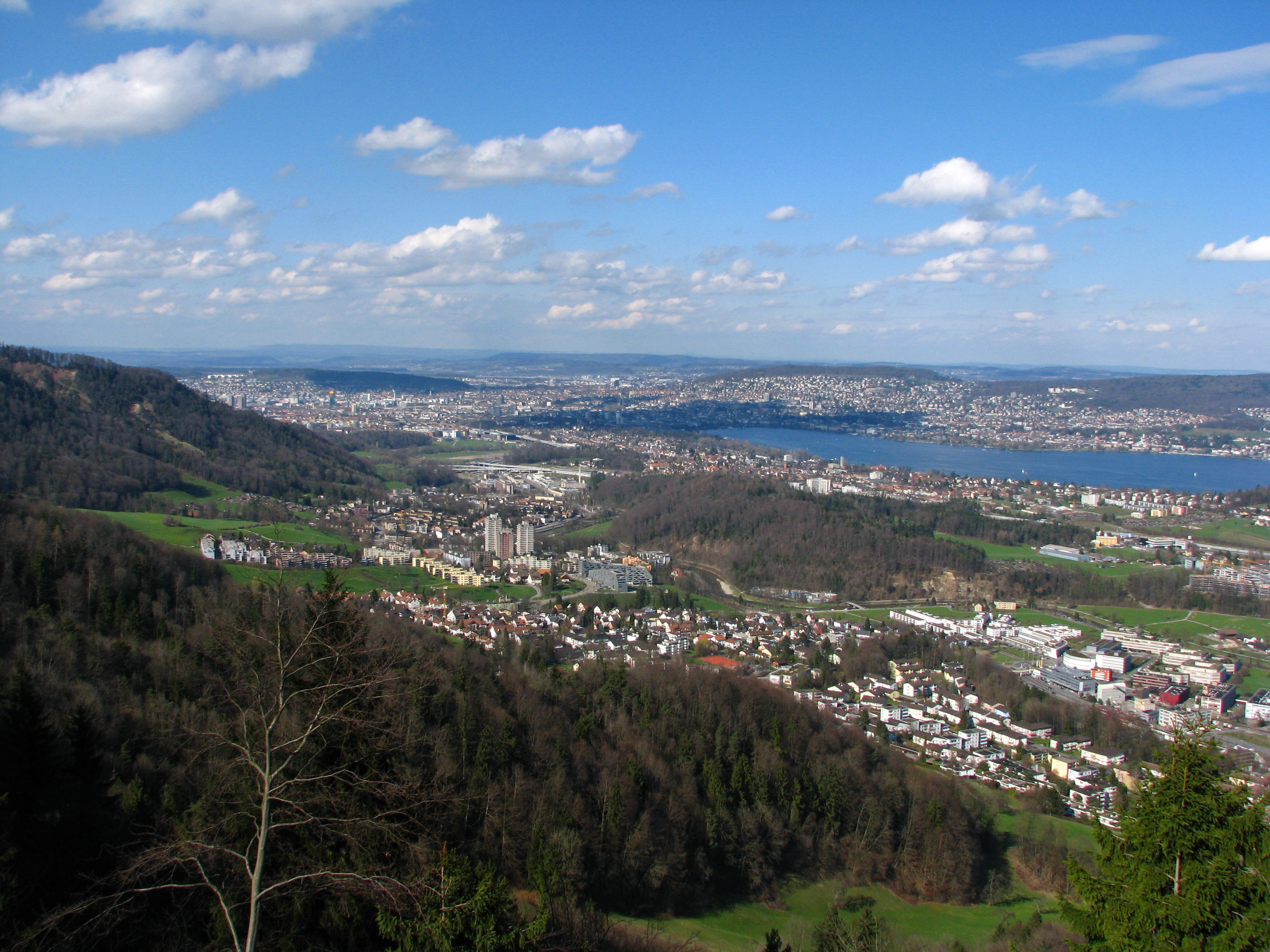
Leimbach, lower Sihl valley, inner city of Zürich and Käferberg (to the left) in the background, as seen from Felsenegg

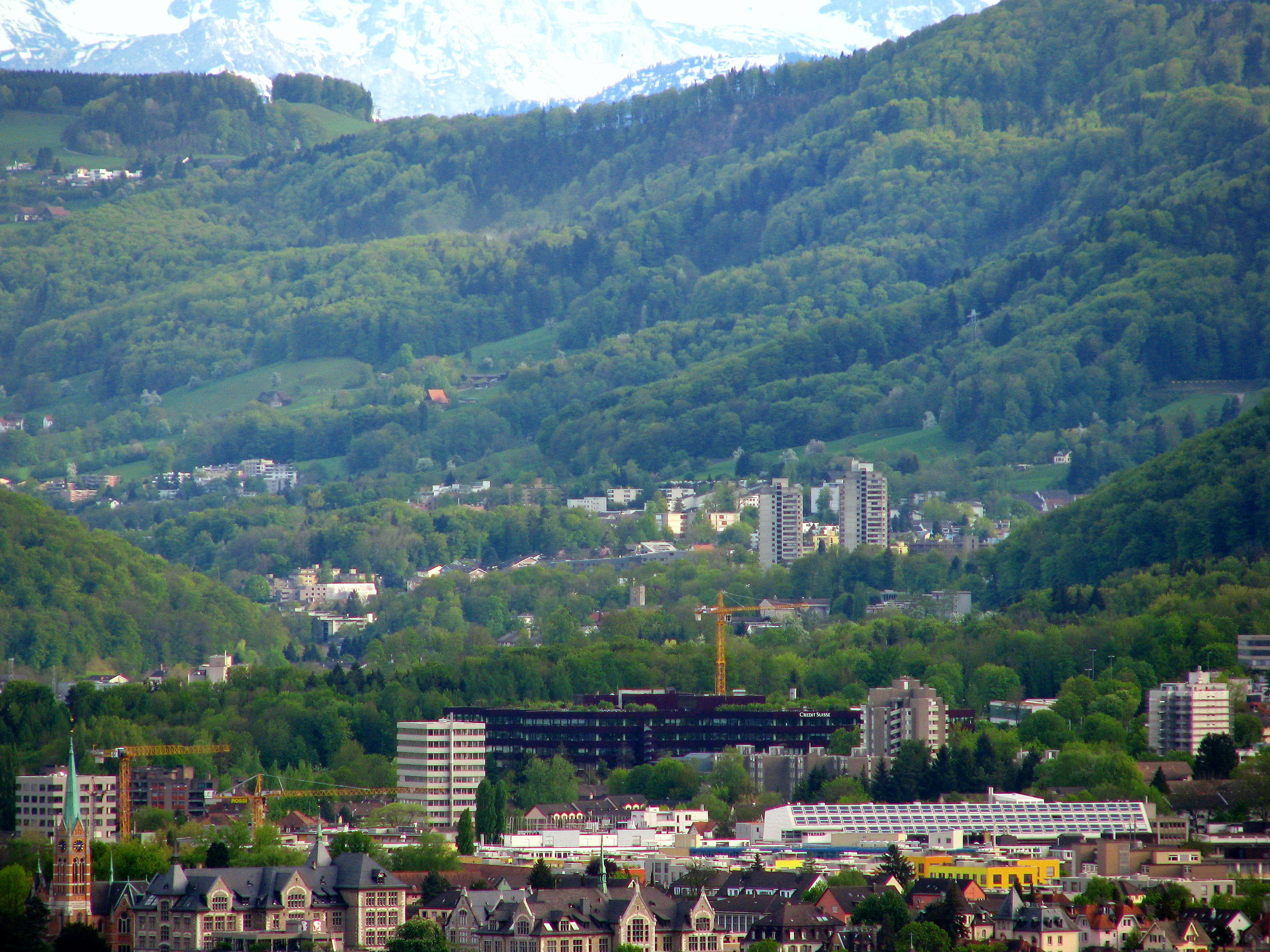
Leimbach and lower Sihltal as seen from the Waidberg

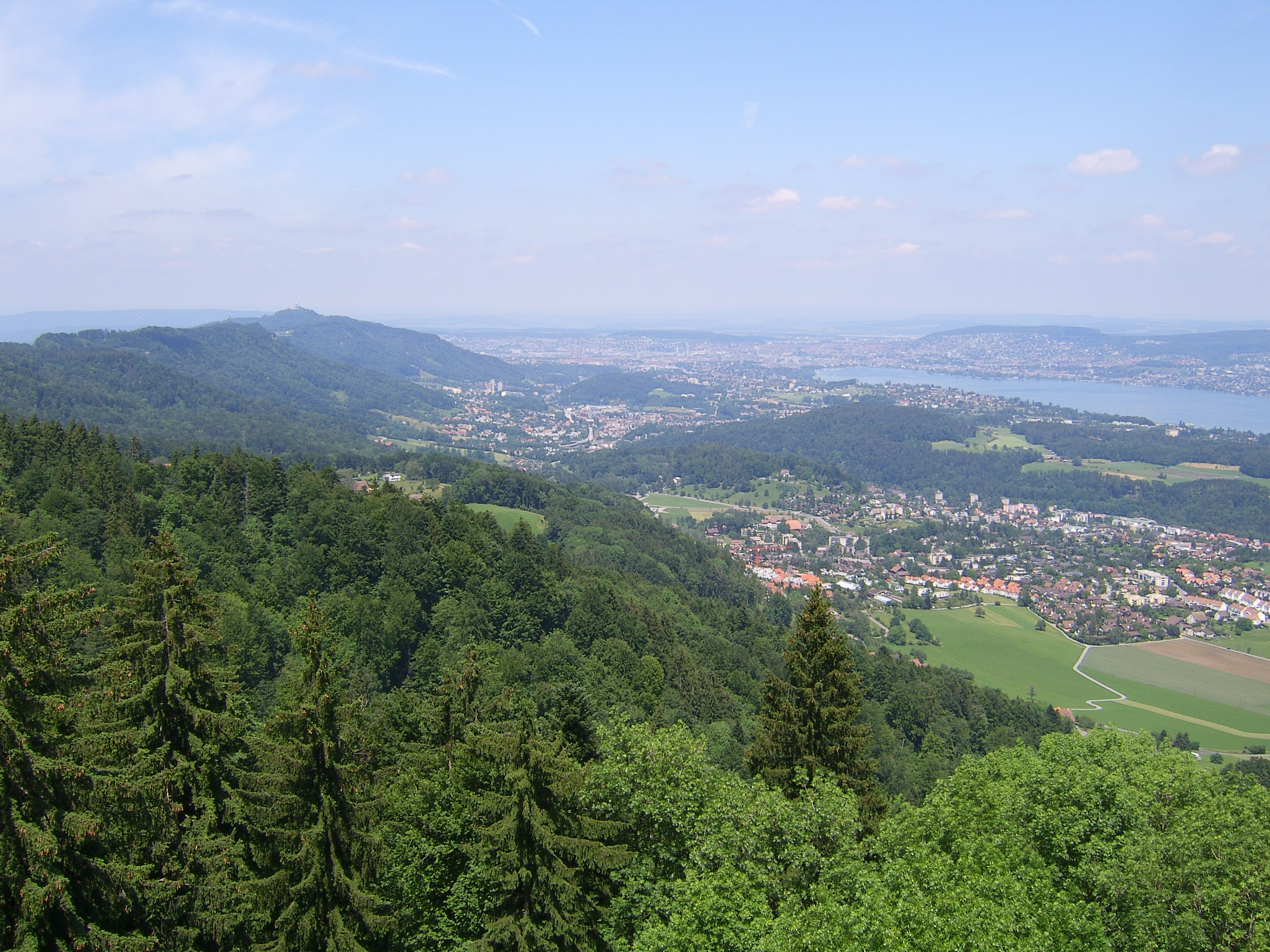
Langnau am Albis, Adliswil, Leimbach and Lake Zürich, as seen from the Albis hills (Hochwacht)

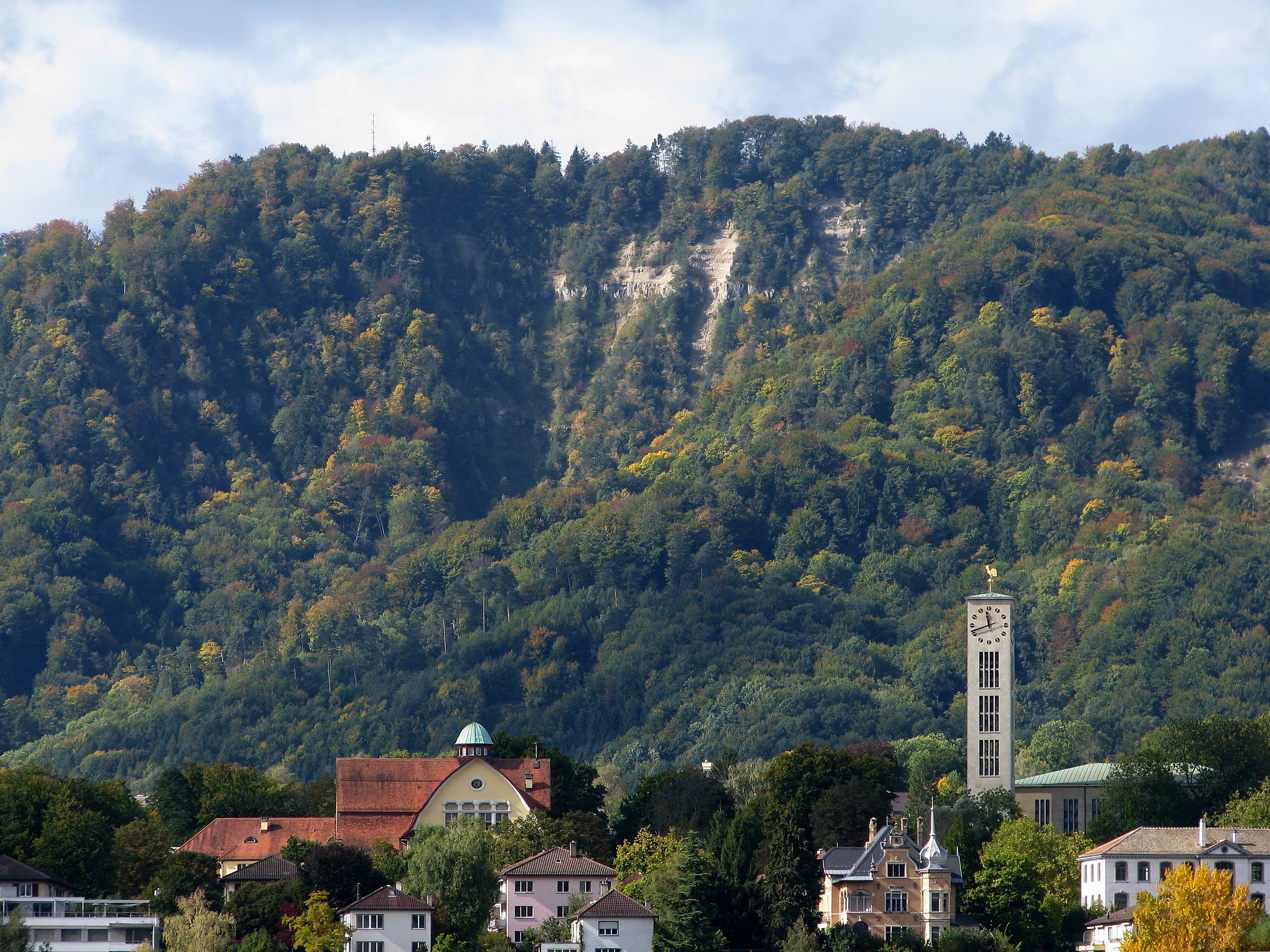
Wollishofen church (right) and Fallätsche (Albis hills) in the background

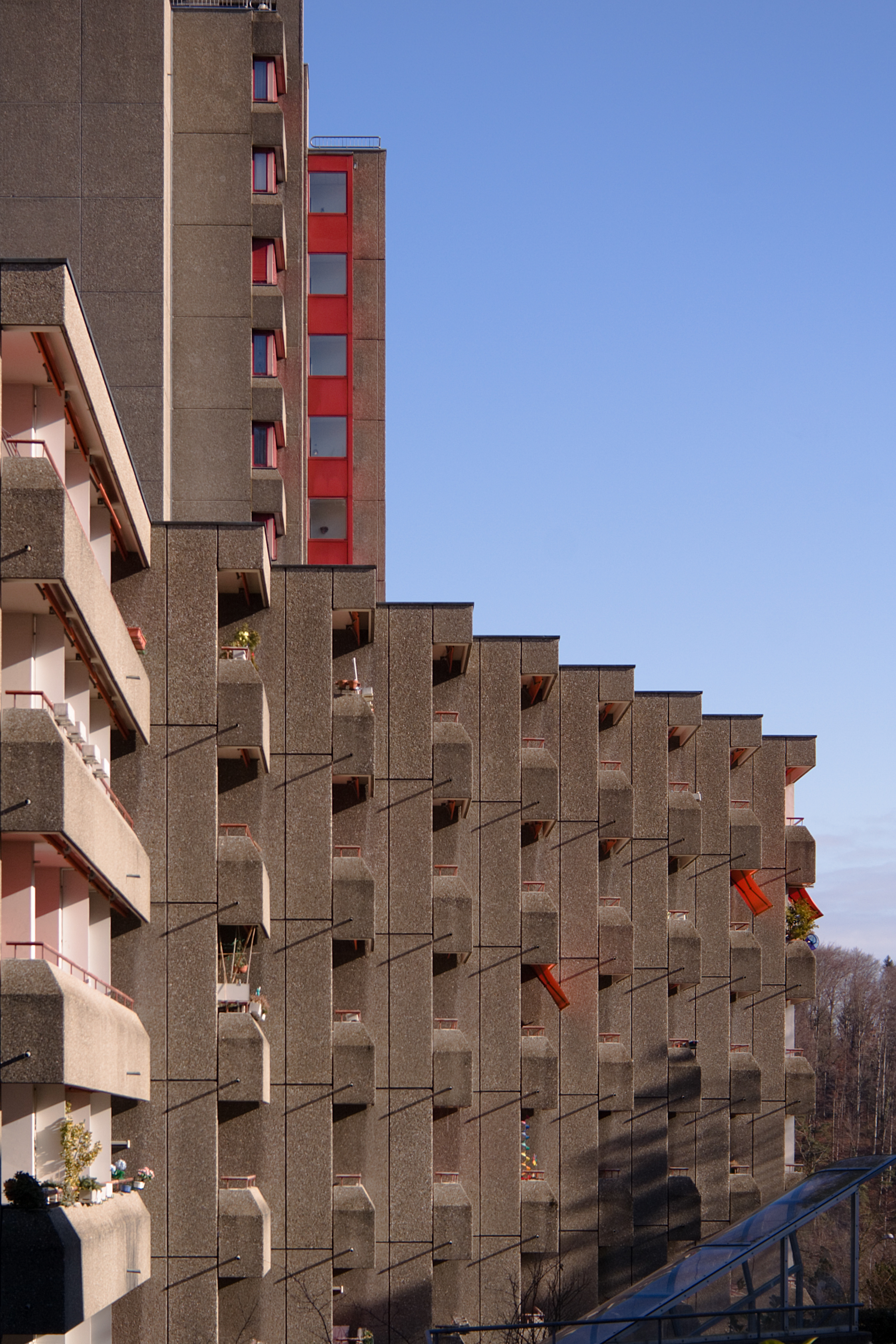
so called Waschbetonhochaus

Aerial view (1962)
