= Zürcher Theater Spektakel =

Coordinates: 47.3692°N 8.5415°E

The Zürcher Theater Spektakel (Zürich Theatre Spectacle) is an international theatre and performing arts festival, held annually each summer in Zurich, Switzerland. First held in 1980, the festival invites 20-25 different performing arts groups and artists from around the world to take part each year. The event began in a much smaller form as an annual international meeting of independent theatre groups, before emerging as a much larger cultural event in Switzerland. Currently, five separate locations are used as venues for the festival, of which the largest is the Landiwiese venue. The Landiwiese venue and the so-called Saffa-Insel are located by Lake Zurich in the Wollishofen quarter, District 2, and features numerous open-air shows.

The most recent event was held from 6 to 23 August 2015, The next festival was scheduled to be held between 19 August to 5 September 2010, and will have a special focus on Asia.

== Gallery ==
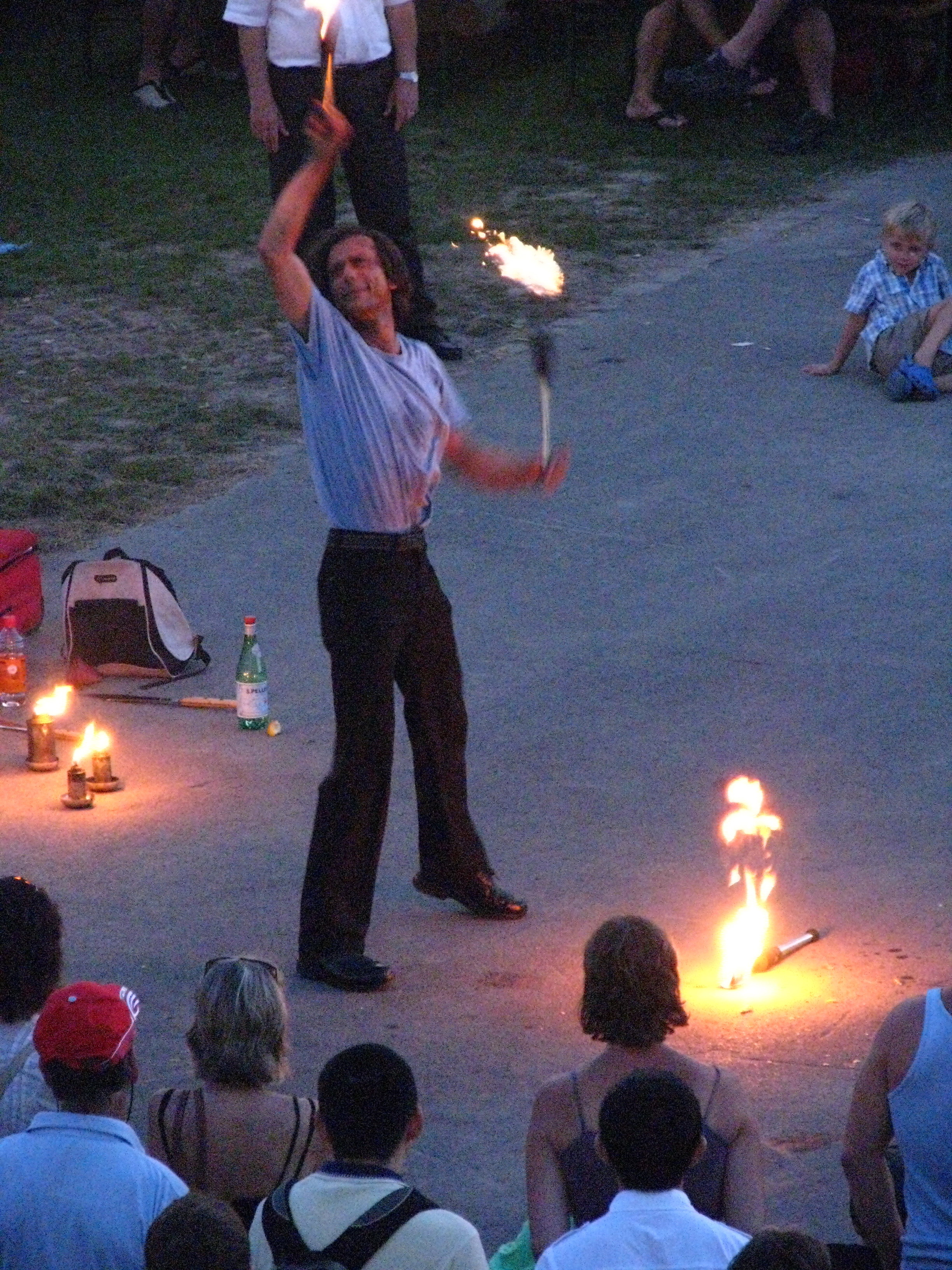

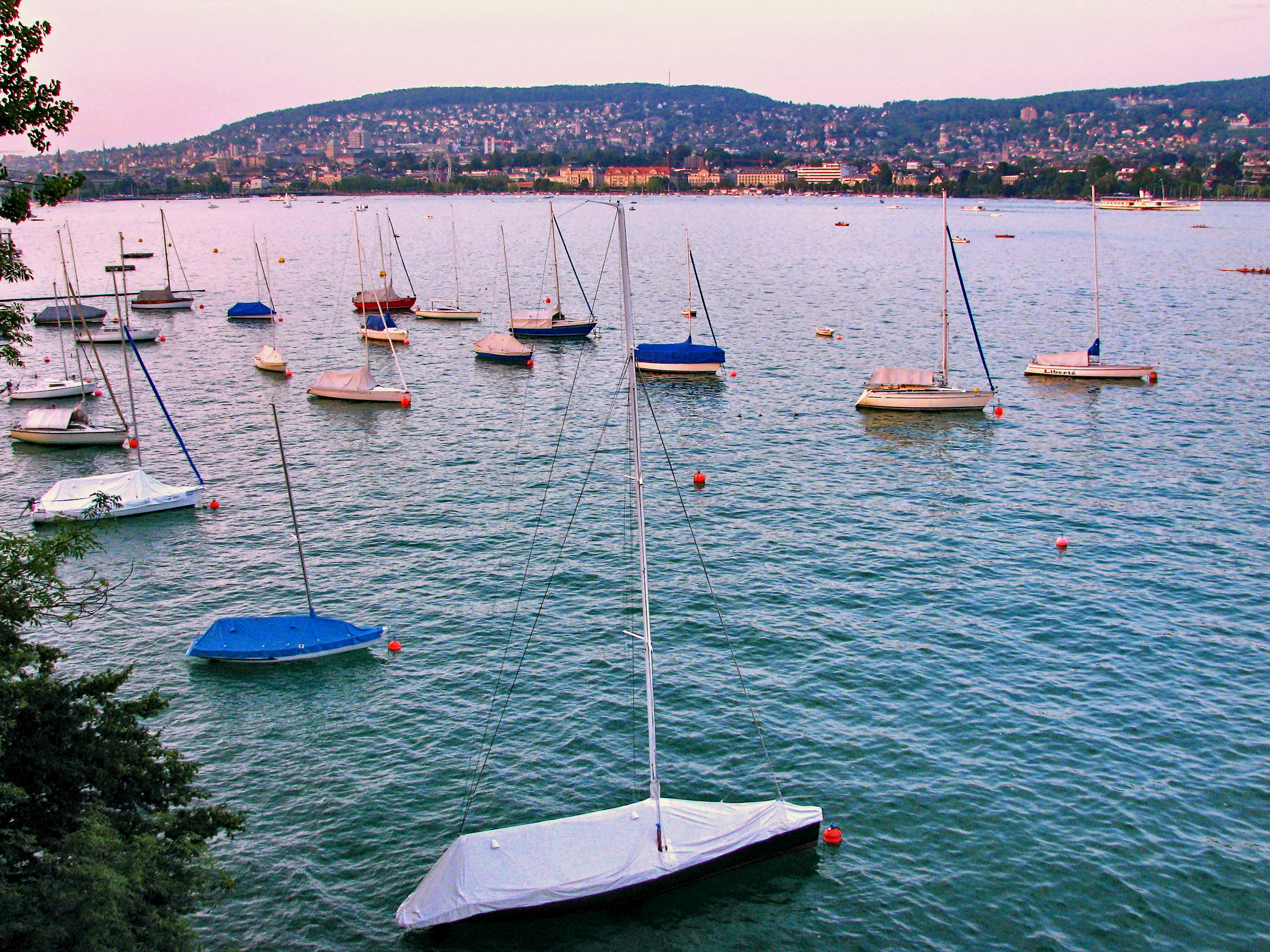

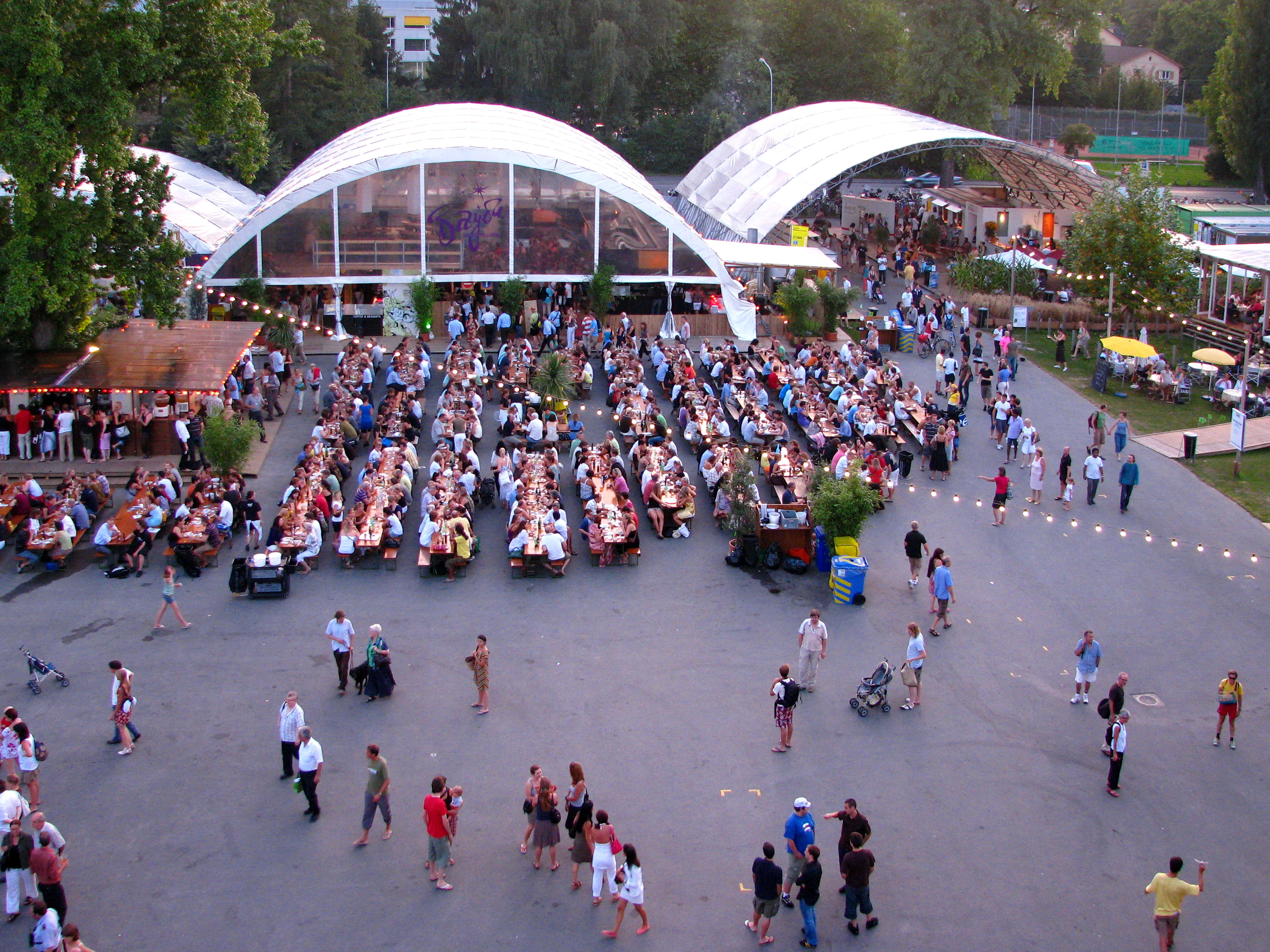

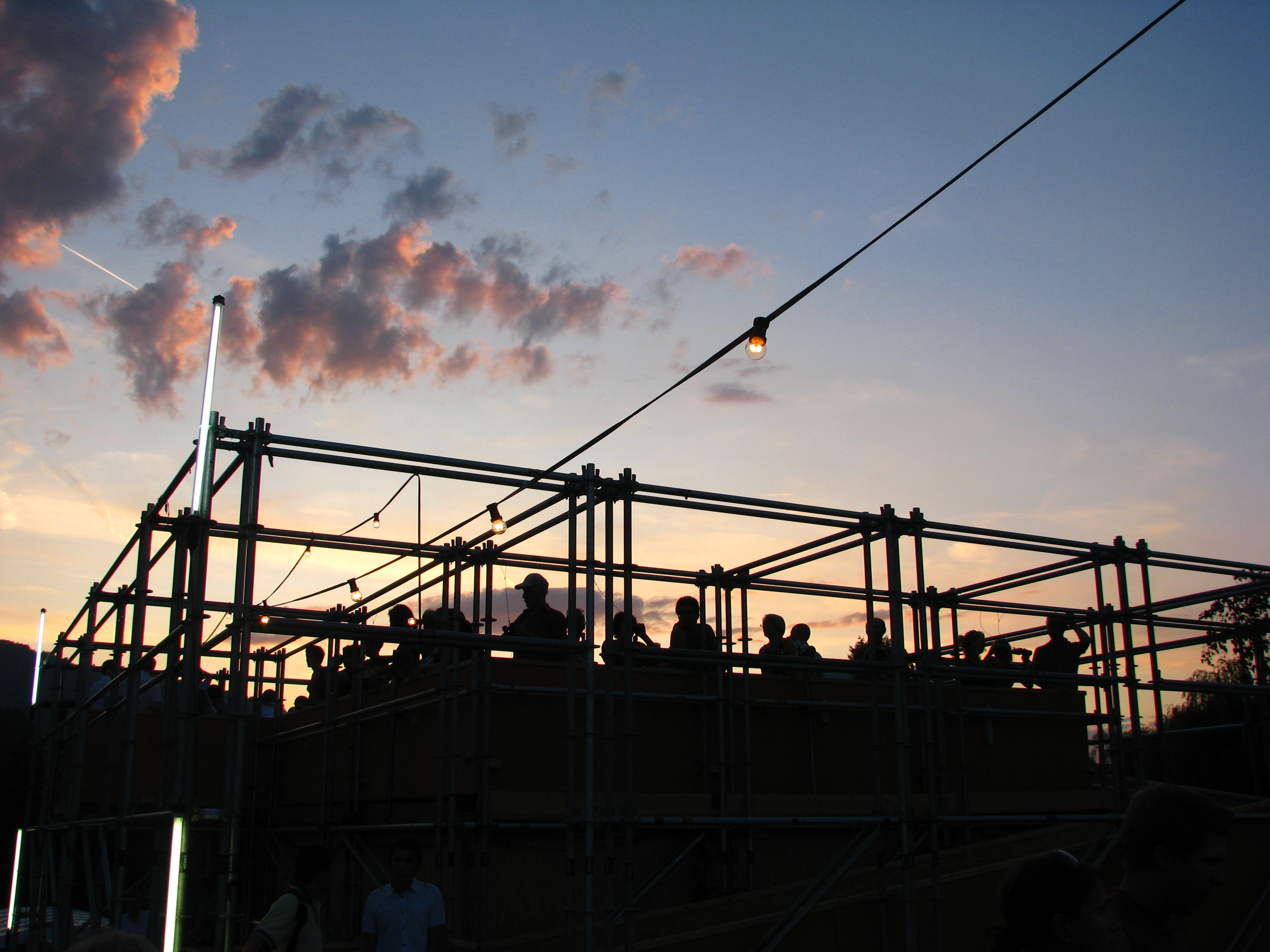

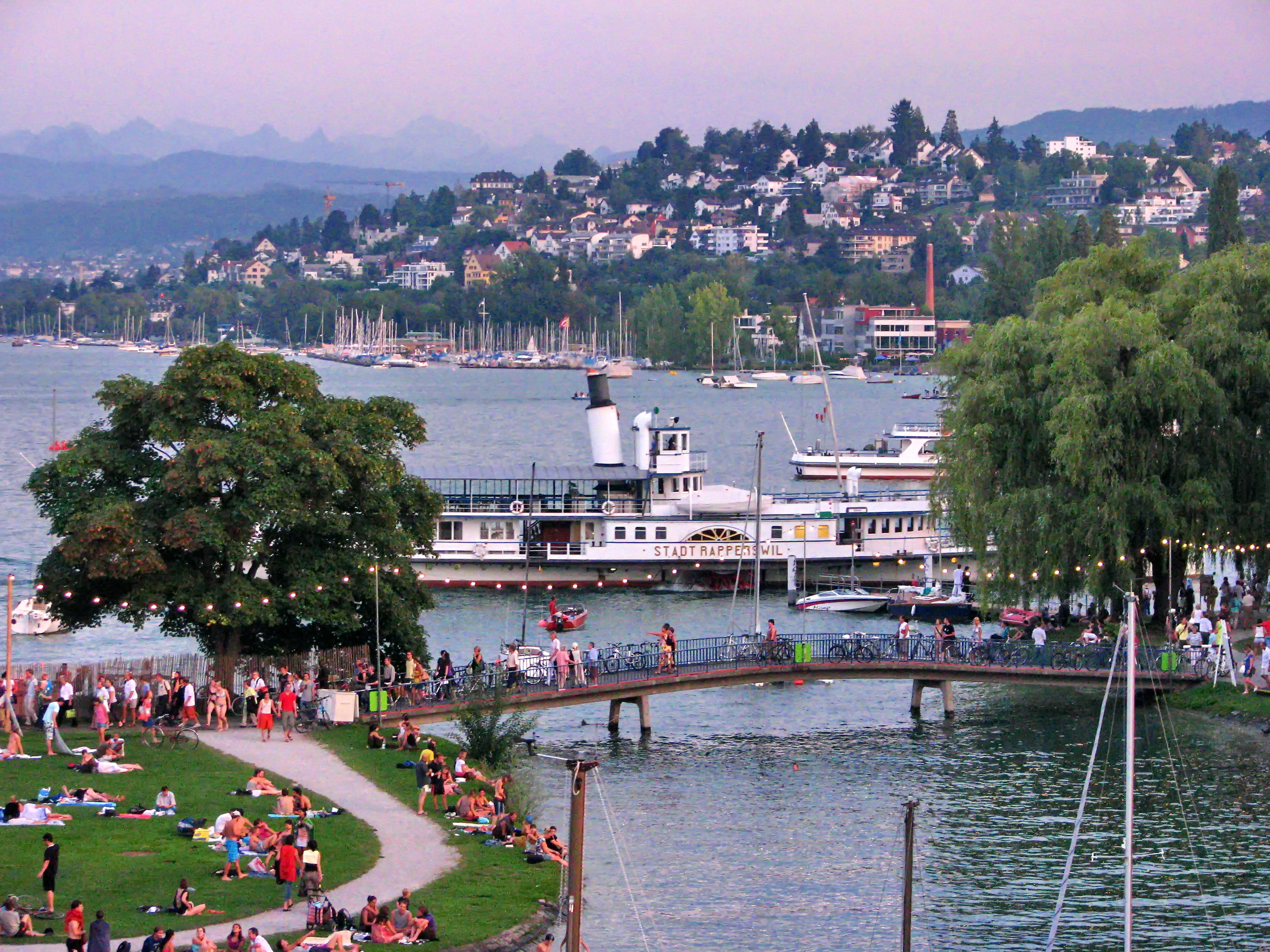

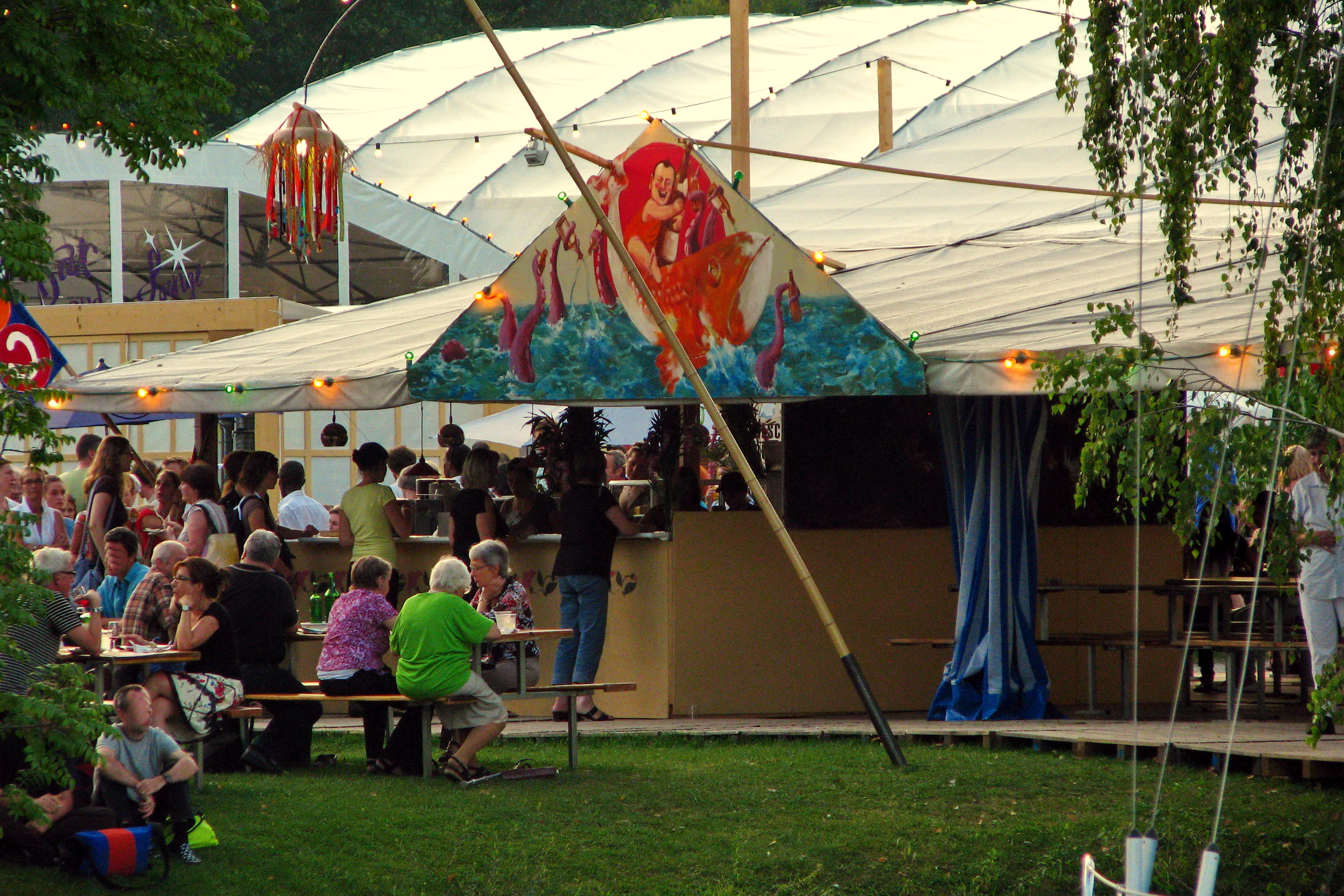

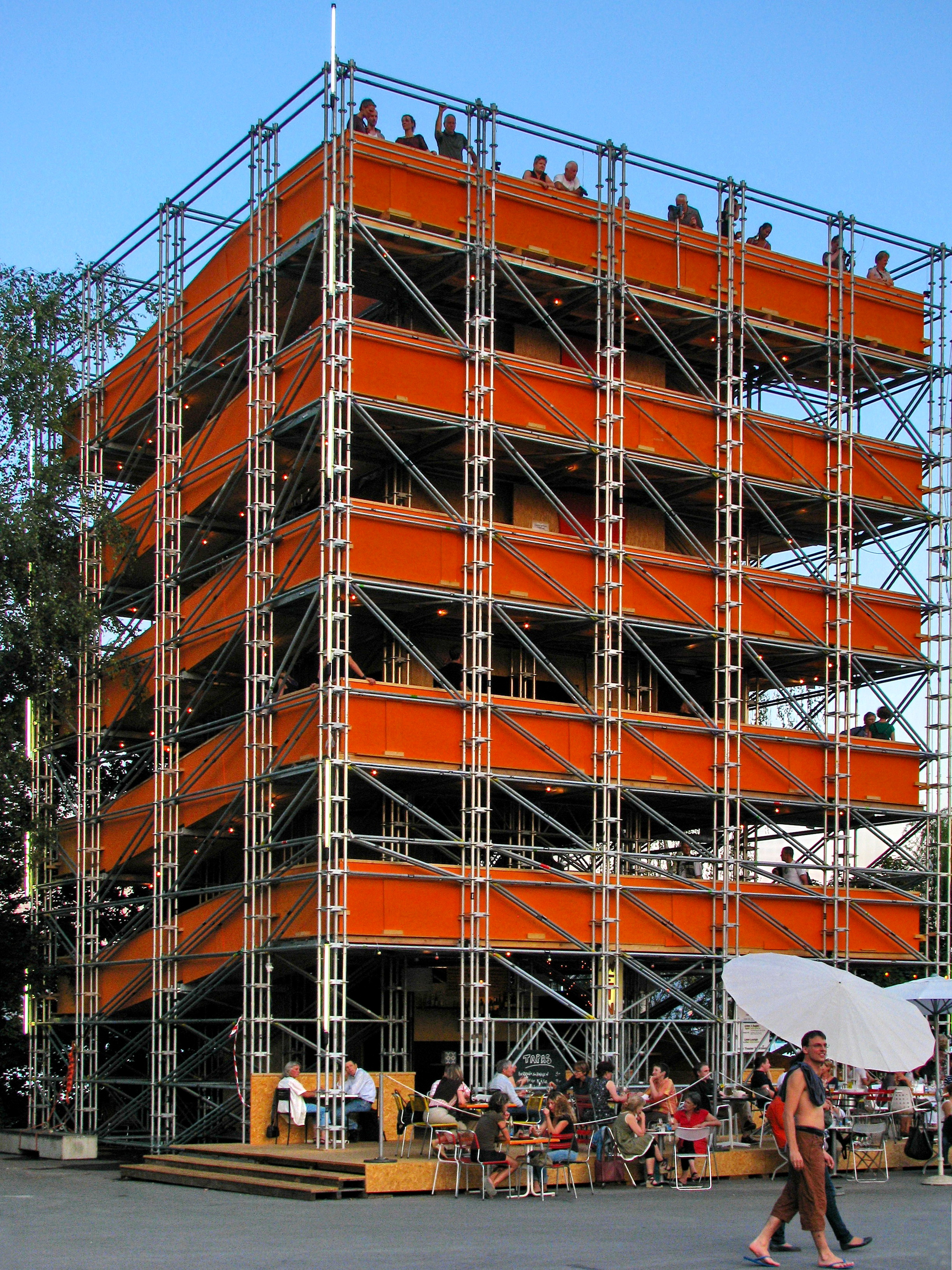

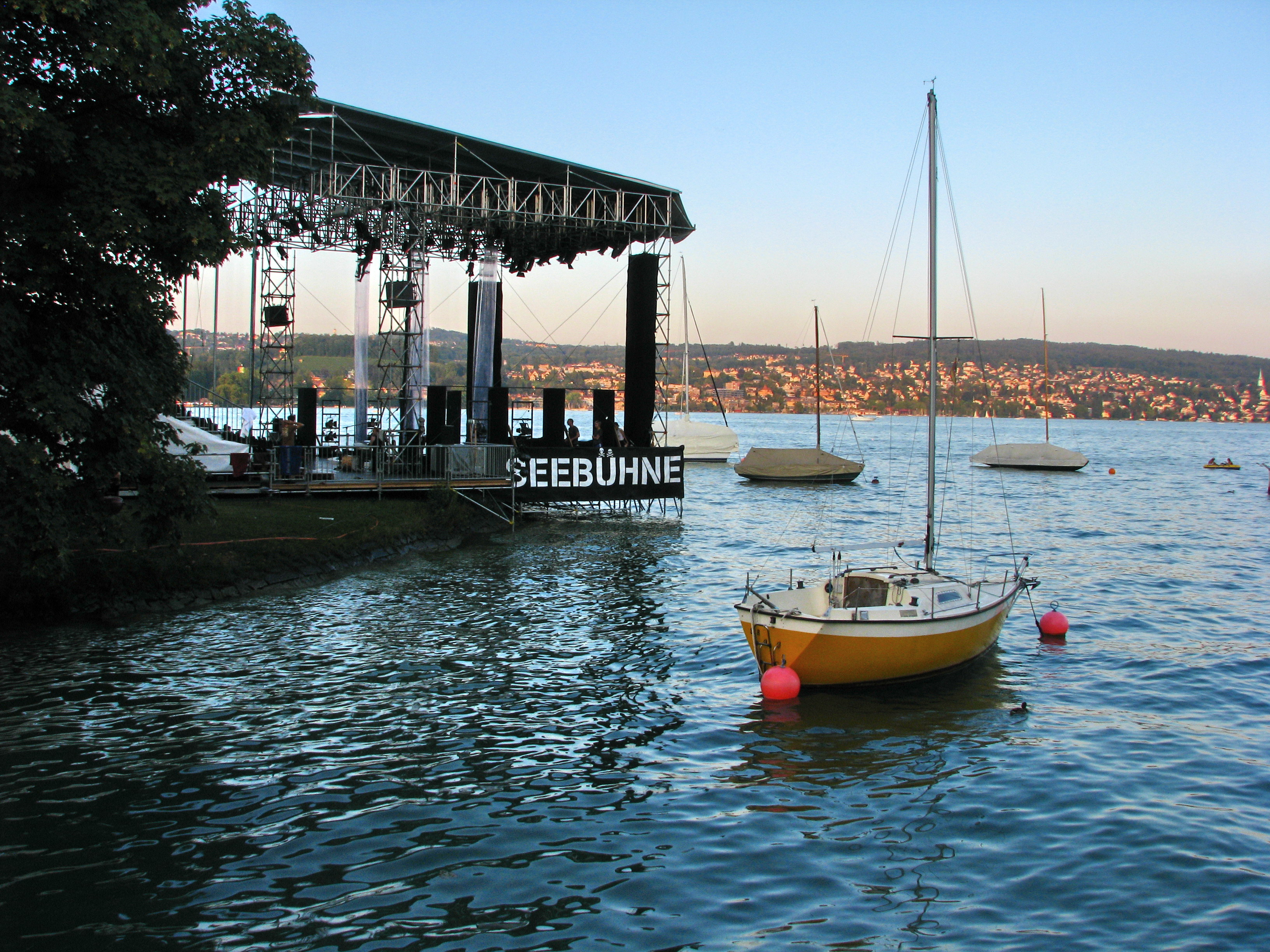

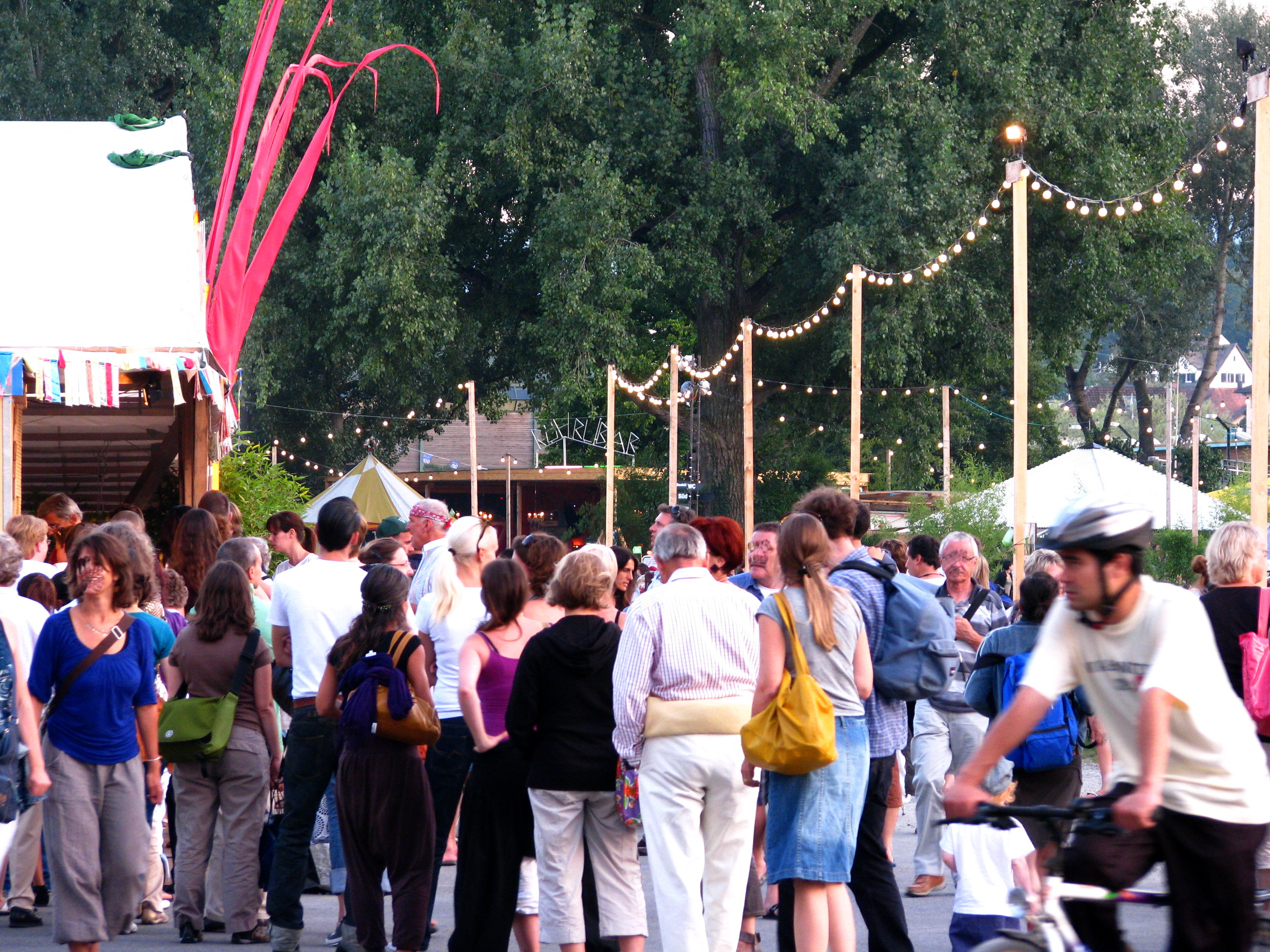

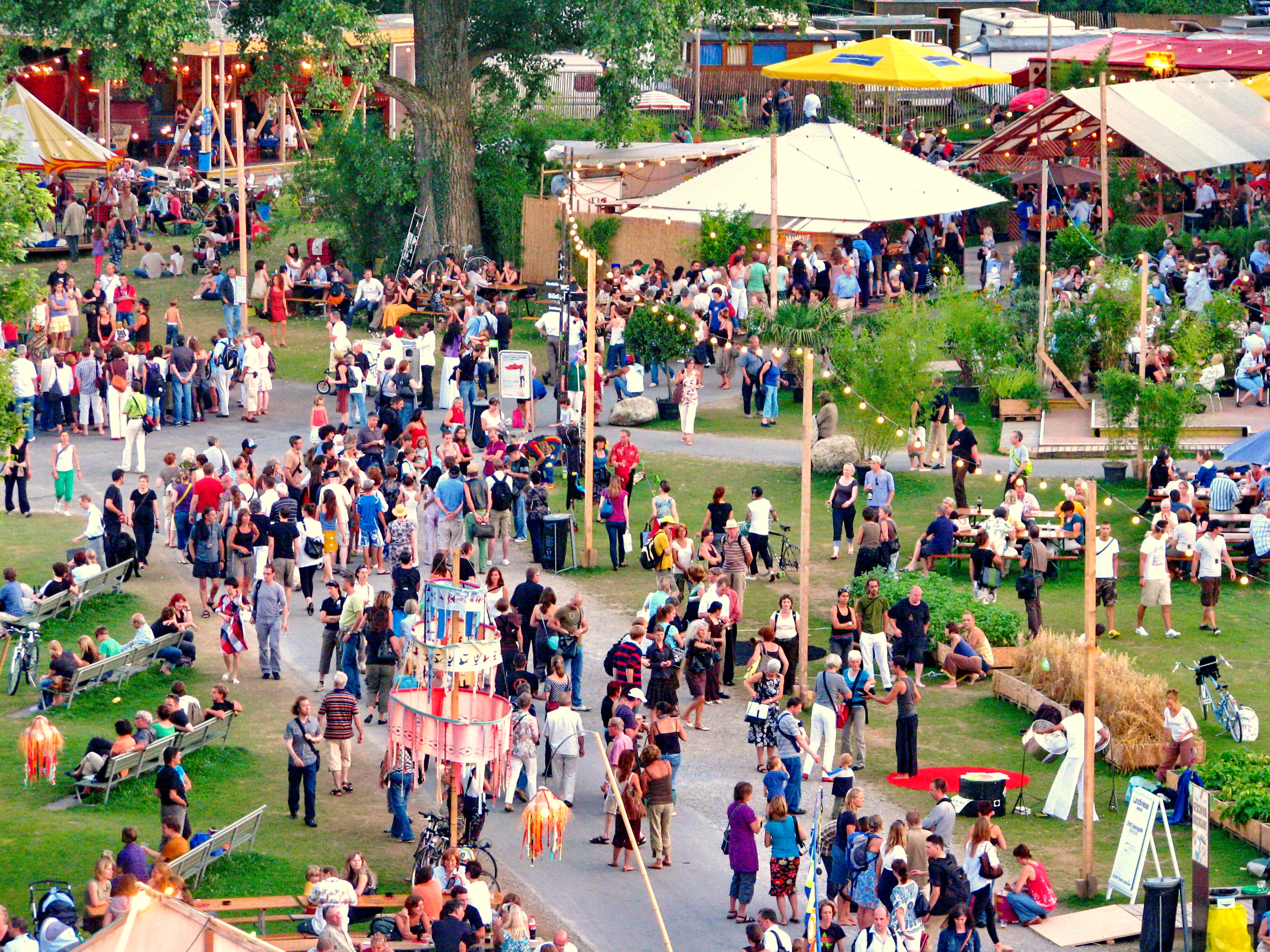

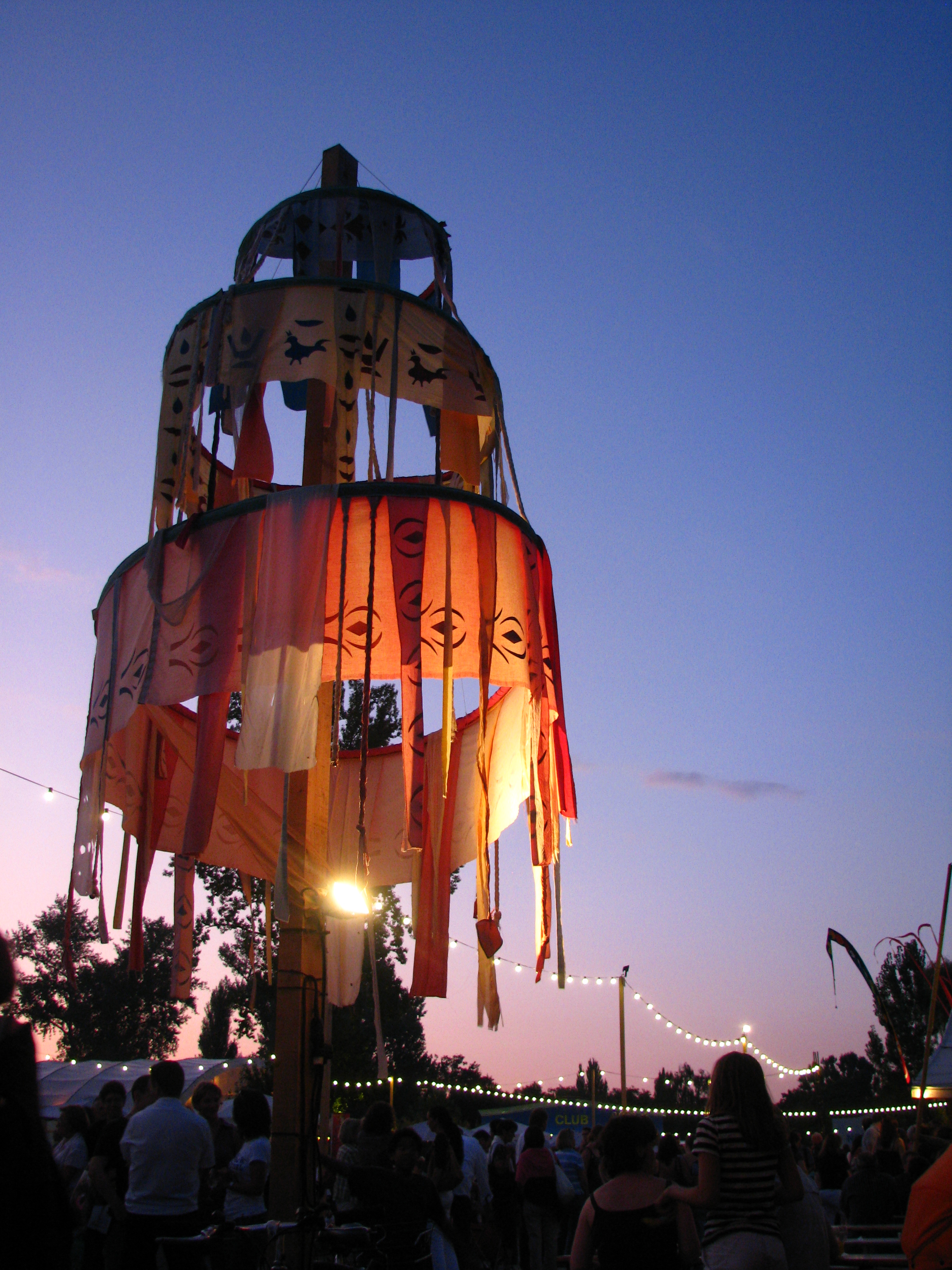

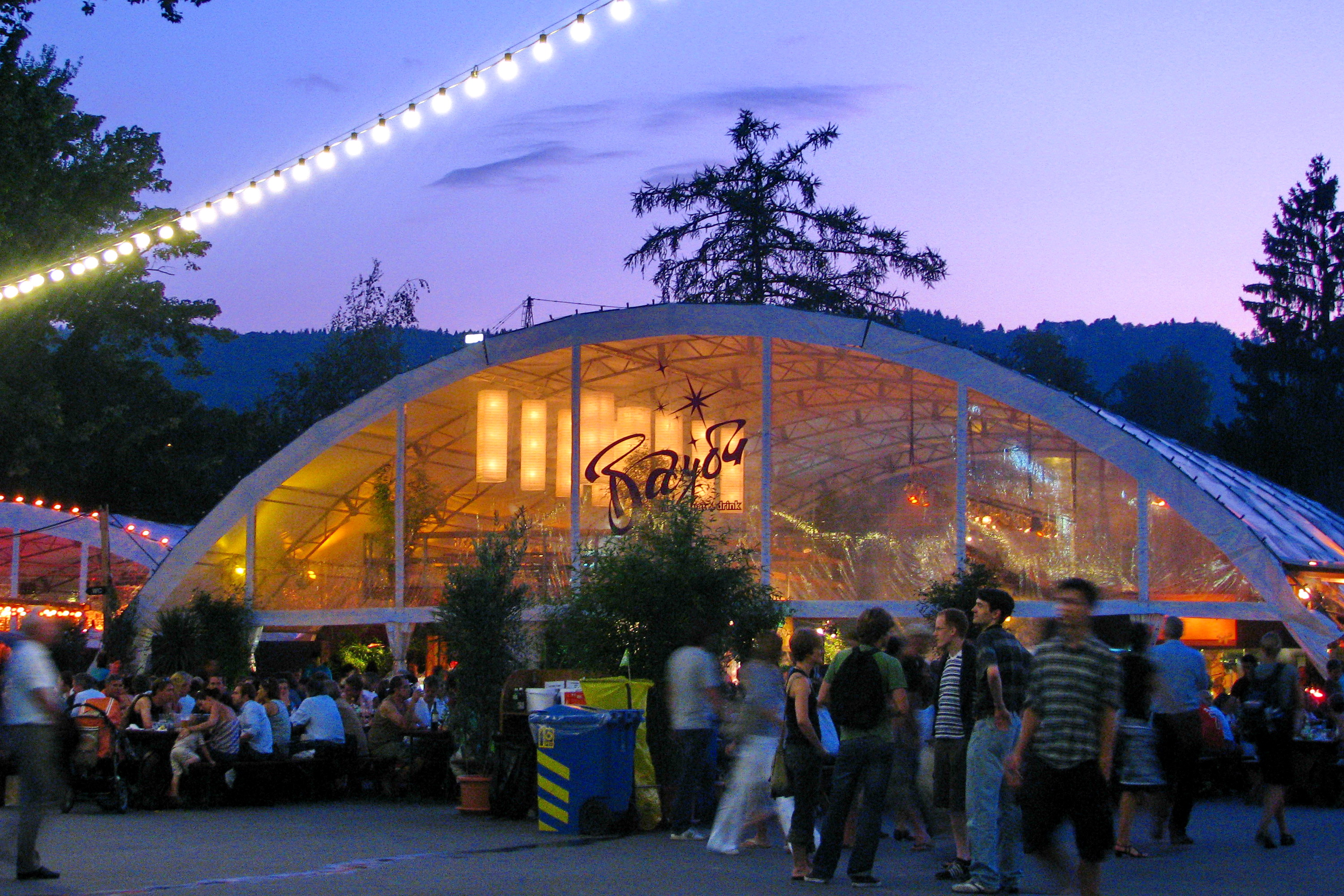
