= Wollishofen =

Quarter of the city of Zurich, Switzerland

Coordinates: 47.343944°N 8.530114°E

- Quarter
- Flag Coat of arms

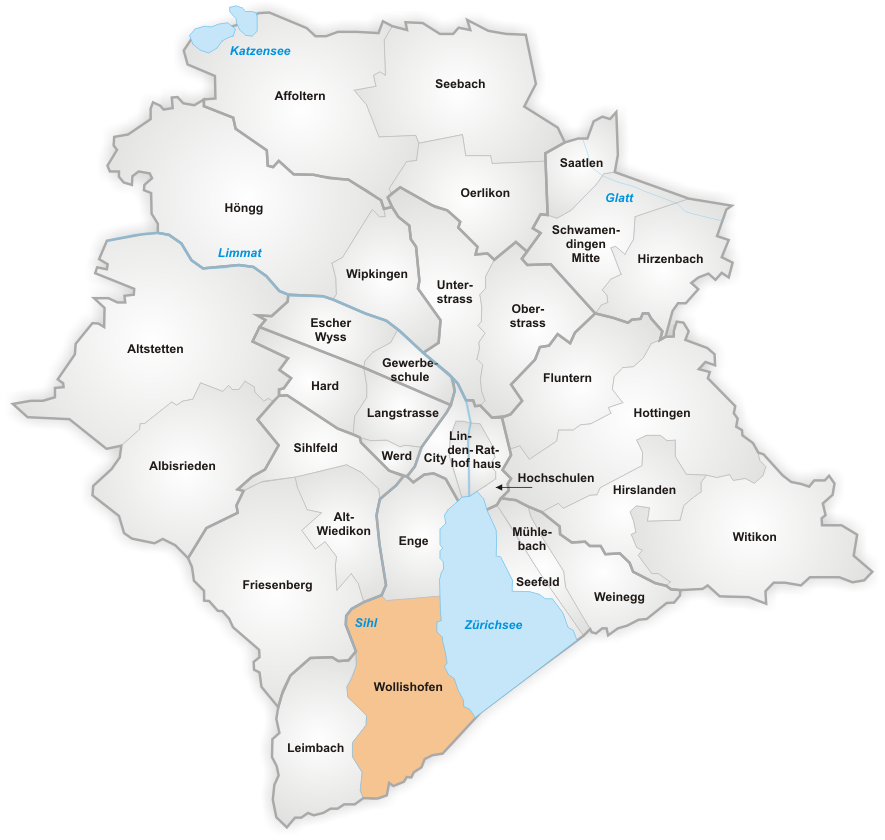
- The quarter of Wollishofen in Zurich
- Country: Switzerland
- Canton: Zurich
- City: Zurich
- District: 2

Wollishofen is a neighbourhood in Zürich's 2nd district, situated in the eastern foothills of Uetliberg. It was formerly a municipality of its own, having been incorporated into Zürich in 1893. As of 2025, the neighbourhood has a population of 21,800 distributed on an area of 5.78 km^{2} (2.23 sq mi).

== Geography ==
Aerial view from 400 m by Walter Mittelholzer (1919). Today's Rote Fabrik is in view at the shoreline.

Located between the Sihl river and Lake Zurich, it forms the southern boundary of the city on the left bank of the lake. The lake occupies 28.5% (1.64 km^{2}) of the total area of the district. To the south, Wollishofen borders the municipalities of Adliswil and Kilchberg.

== Werkbundsiedlung Neubühl ==
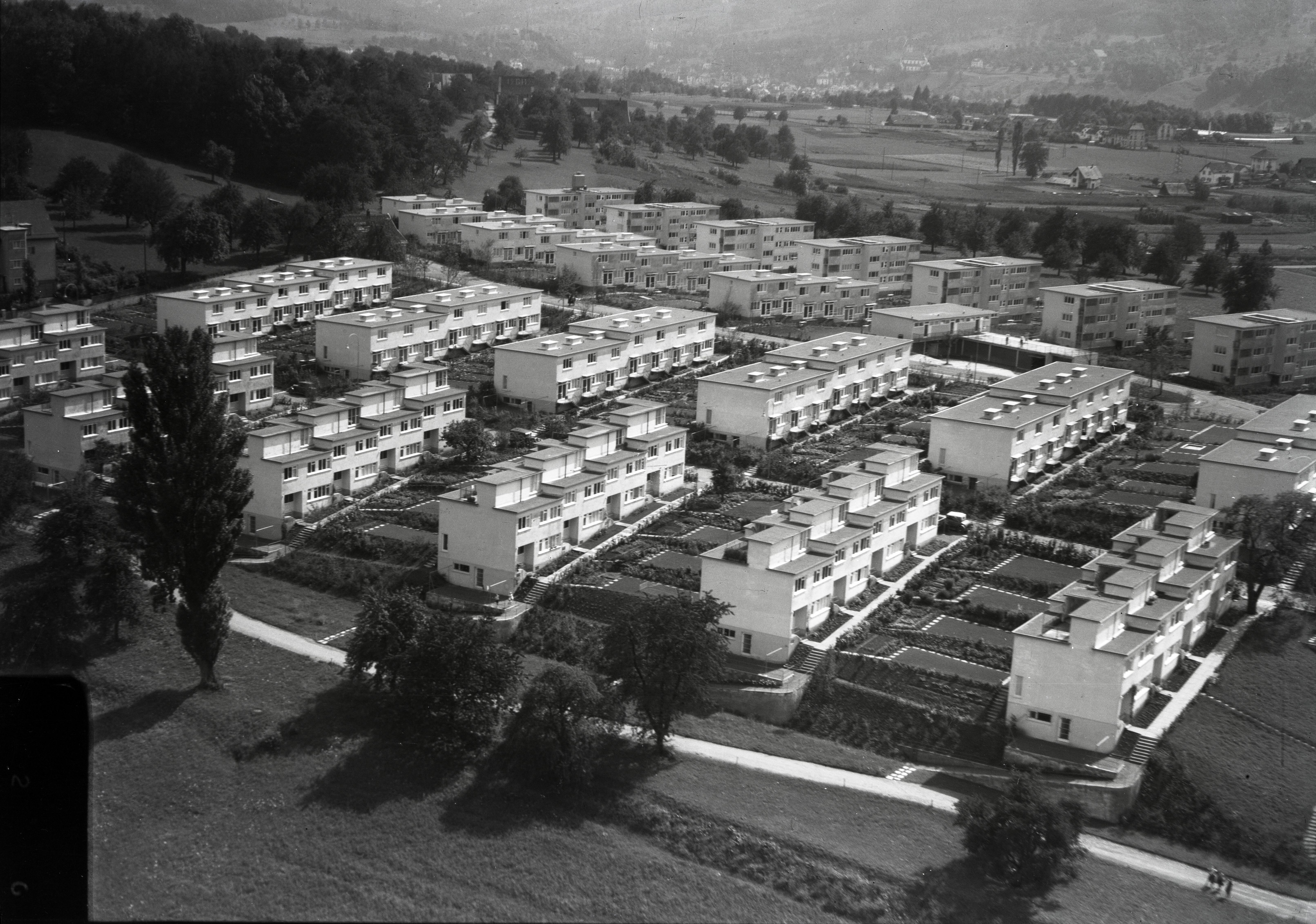
Werkbundsiedlung Neubühl

A New Objectivity estate constructed between 1930 and 1932. The architects involved include Max Haefeli, Alfred Roth, Emil Roth, Carl Hubacher, Rudolf Steiger, Werner Max Moser and Paul Artaria.

== Transport ==
Wollishofen is located on the A3 motorway, and on tram route 7 of the Verkehrsbetriebe Zürich. Zürich Wollishofen railway station is a stop on line S8 and S24 of the Zürich S-Bahn or Bus-Line 72.

The Zürichsee-Schifffahrtsgesellschaft (ZSG) and its ship yard are located in Wollishofen.

== Culture ==
Zürcher Theater Spektakel, an international theater festival ranking among the most important European festivals for contemporary performing arts, is held annually in August on the Landiwiese lakeshore and on the Saffa-Insel. The cultural centre Rote Fabrik is also located in Wollishofen, as well as Lydia Escher's former home, the Villa Belvoir.

== Education ==
International schools:

- SIS Swiss International School

== Sport ==
The neighbourhood's football club is FC Wollishofen. Their stadium, located on Zürichstrasse, is called Sonnau. As of 2020–21, the team plays in the 2. Liga Region Zürich, the sixth tier of football in Switzerland.

== Notable people ==
- Walter Andreas Müller (born 1945), actor and comedian, born and raised in Zürich.

== Gallery ==
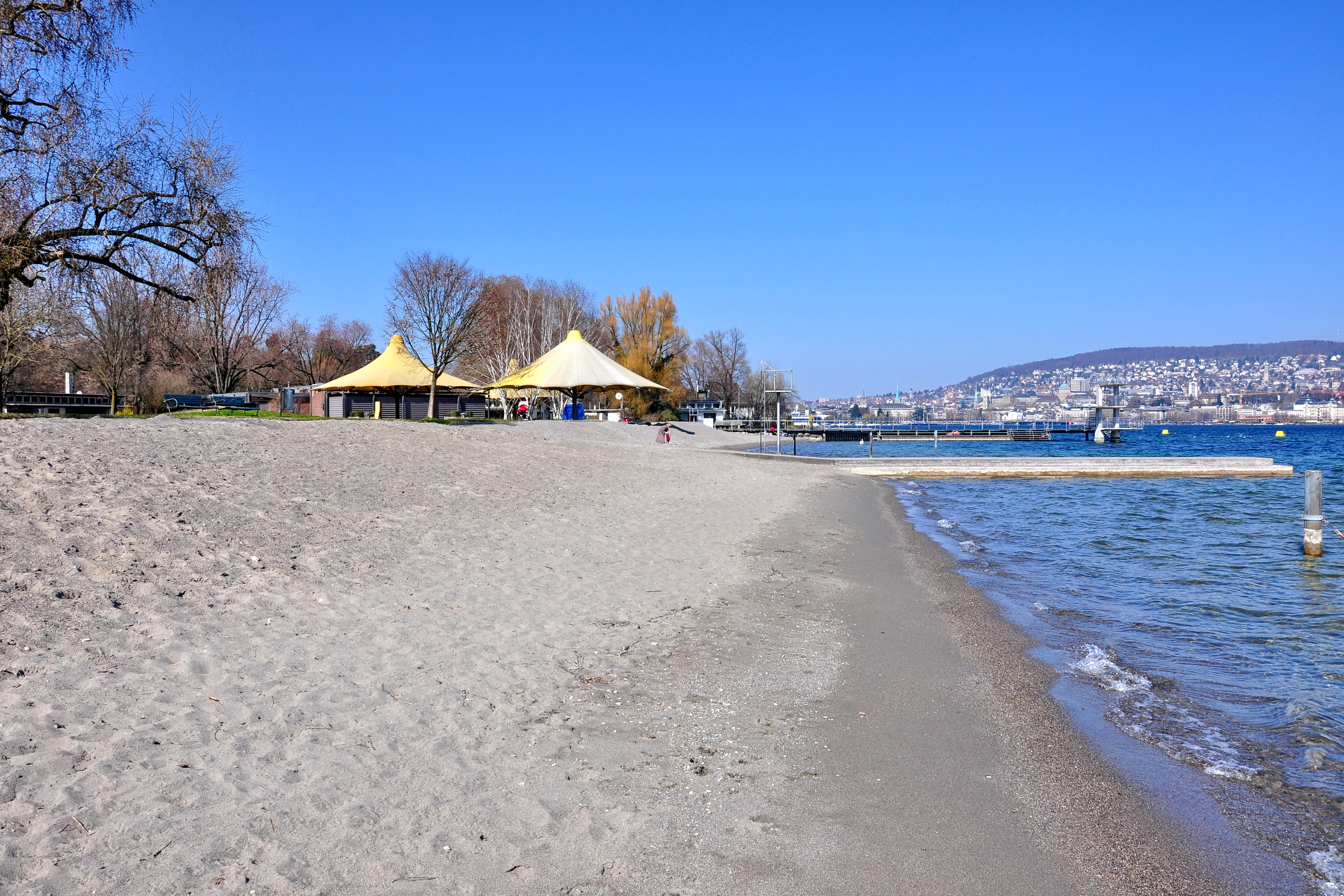
Strandbad Mythenquai

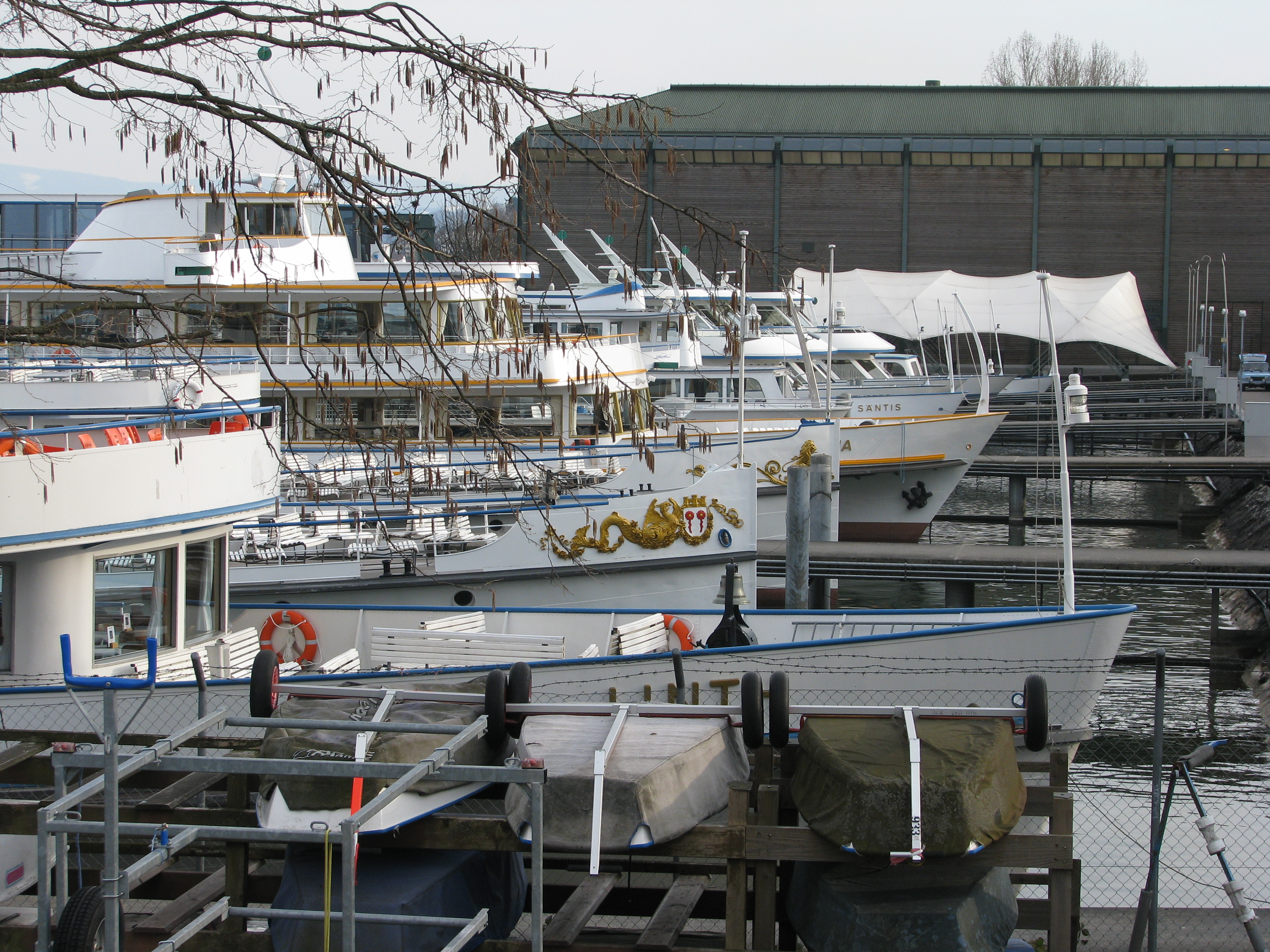
ZSG ship yard

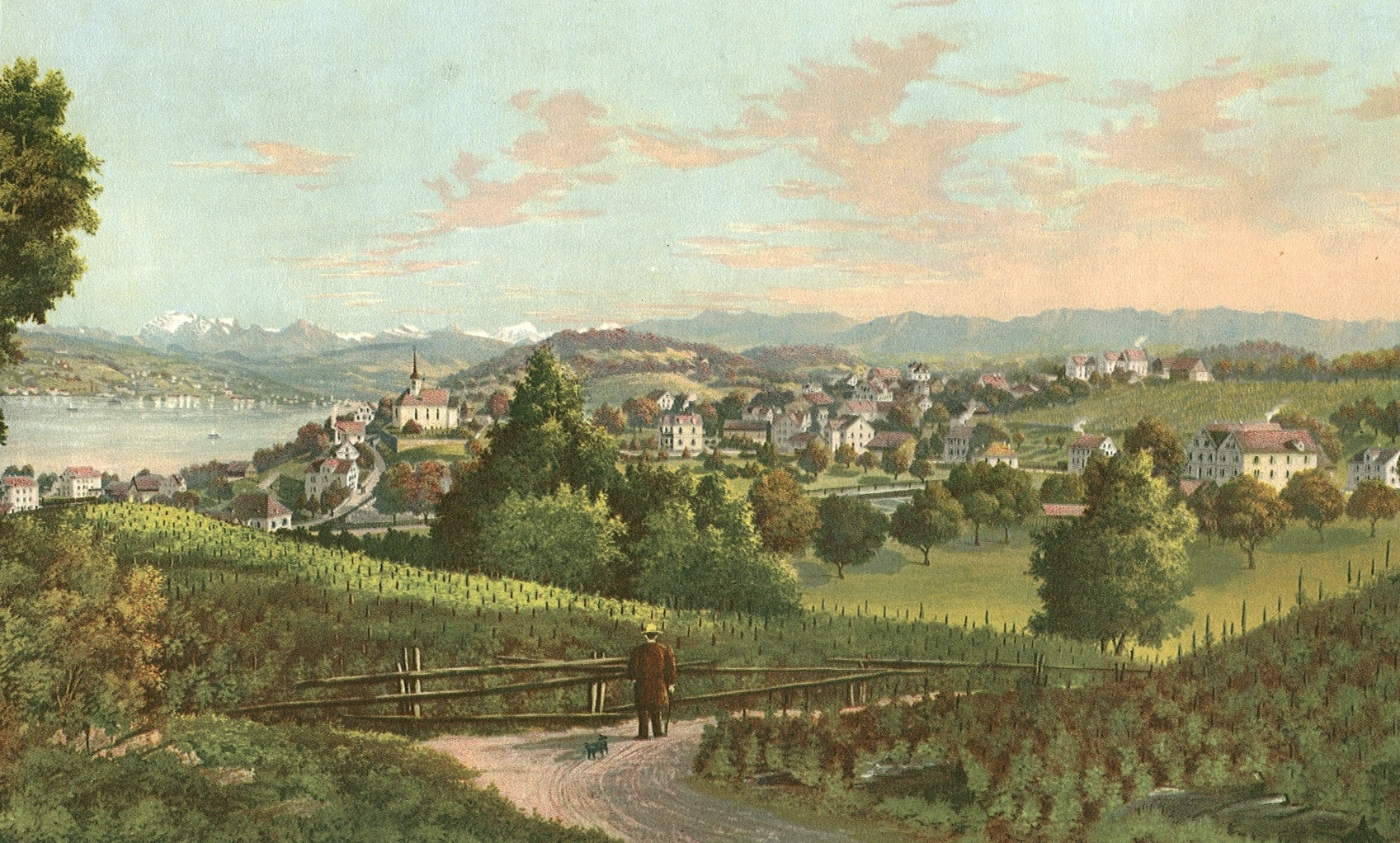
Wollishofen (1880)

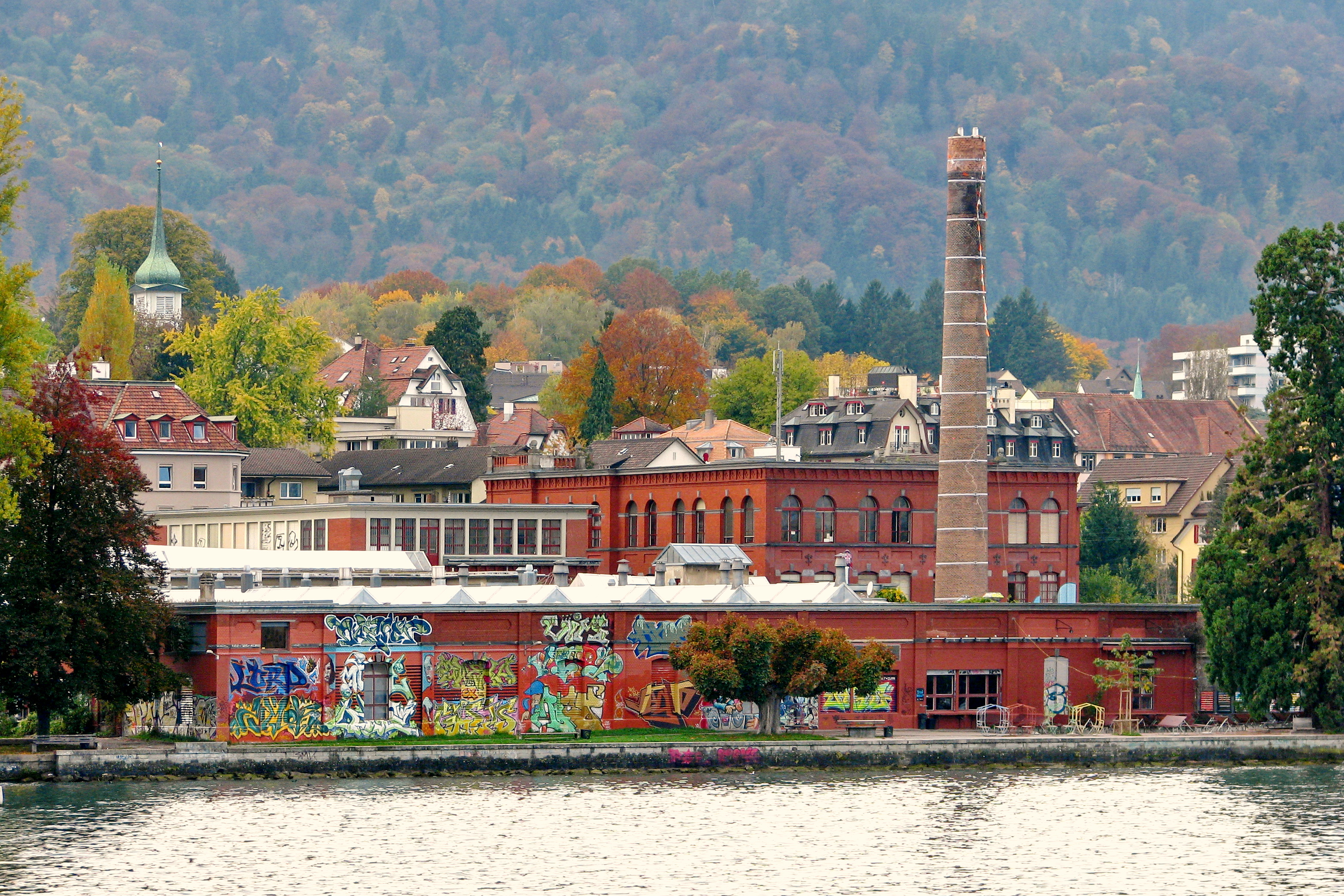
Rote Fabrik, seen from Lake Zurich

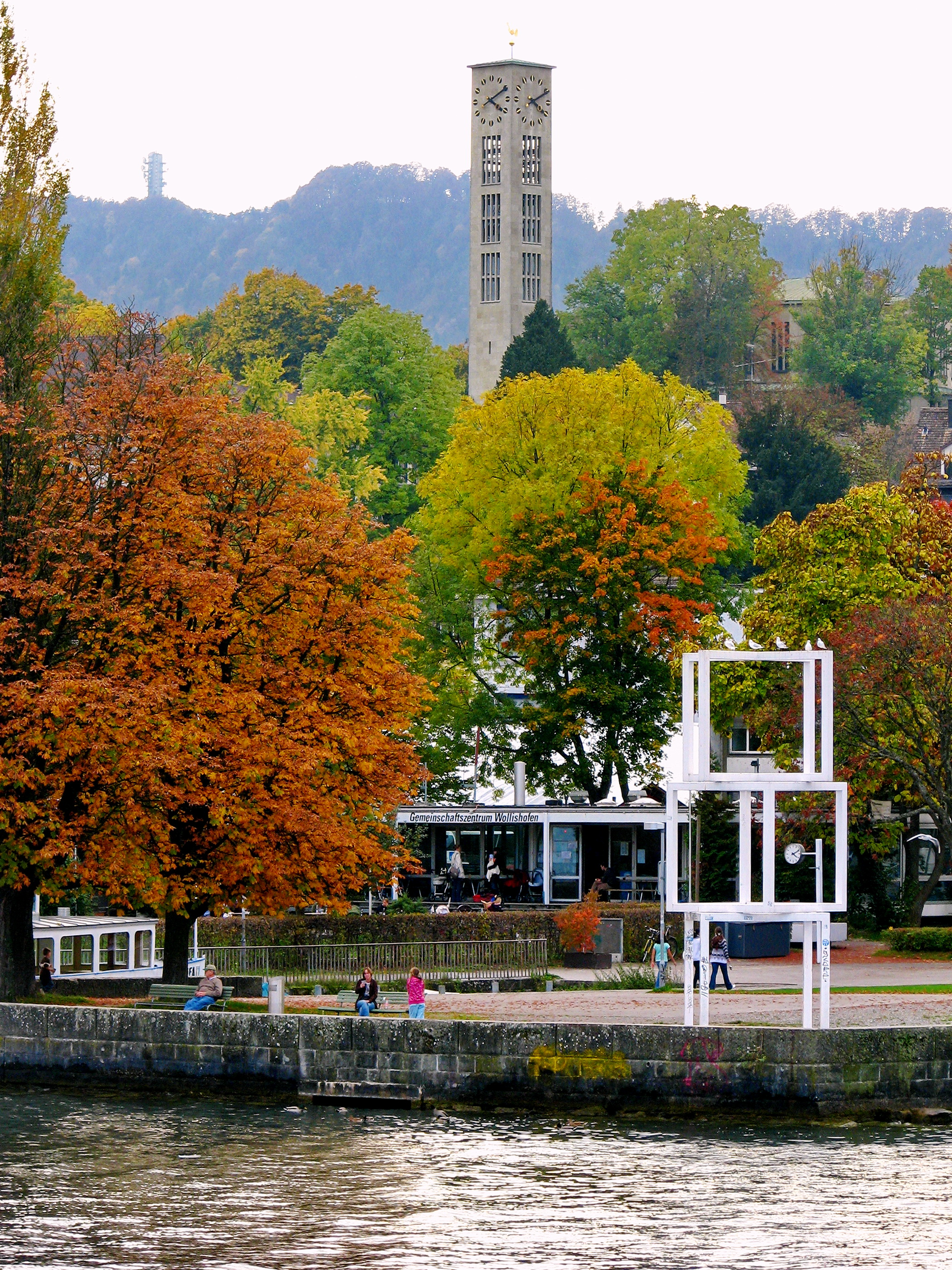
Harbour, community center, and Albis hills and Felsenegg in the background

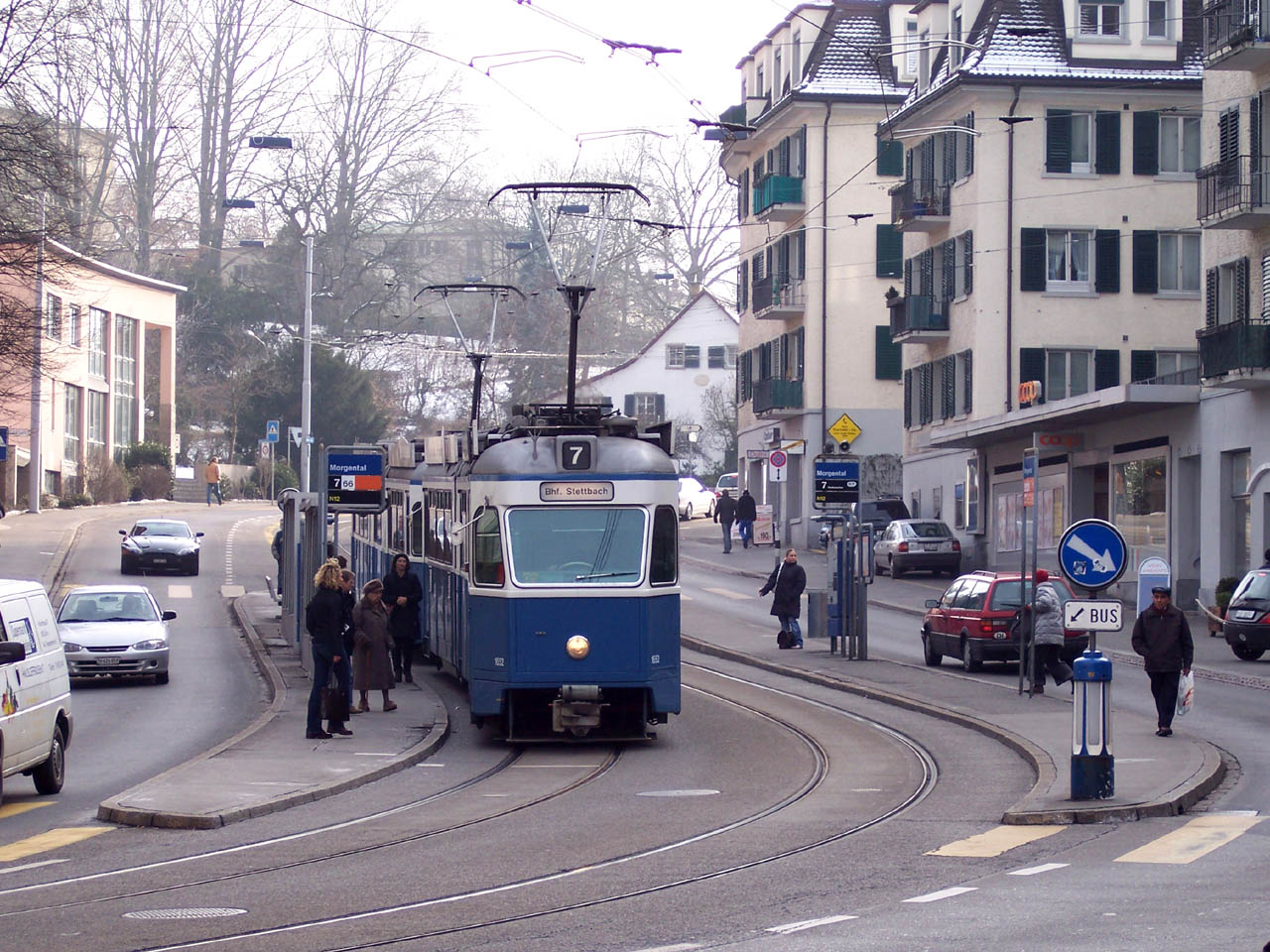
Tram stop Morgental

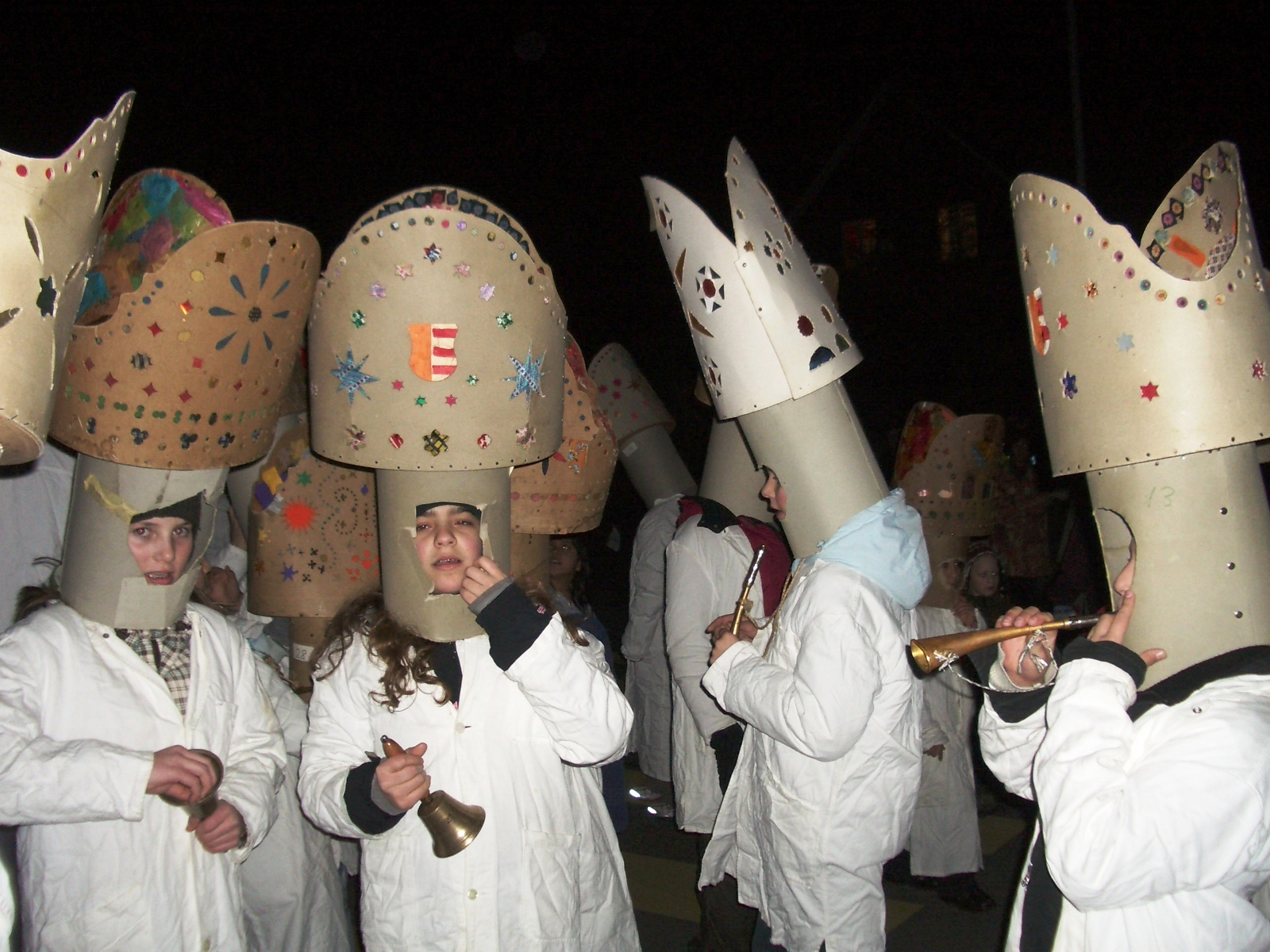
Wollishofer Chläuse (2007)

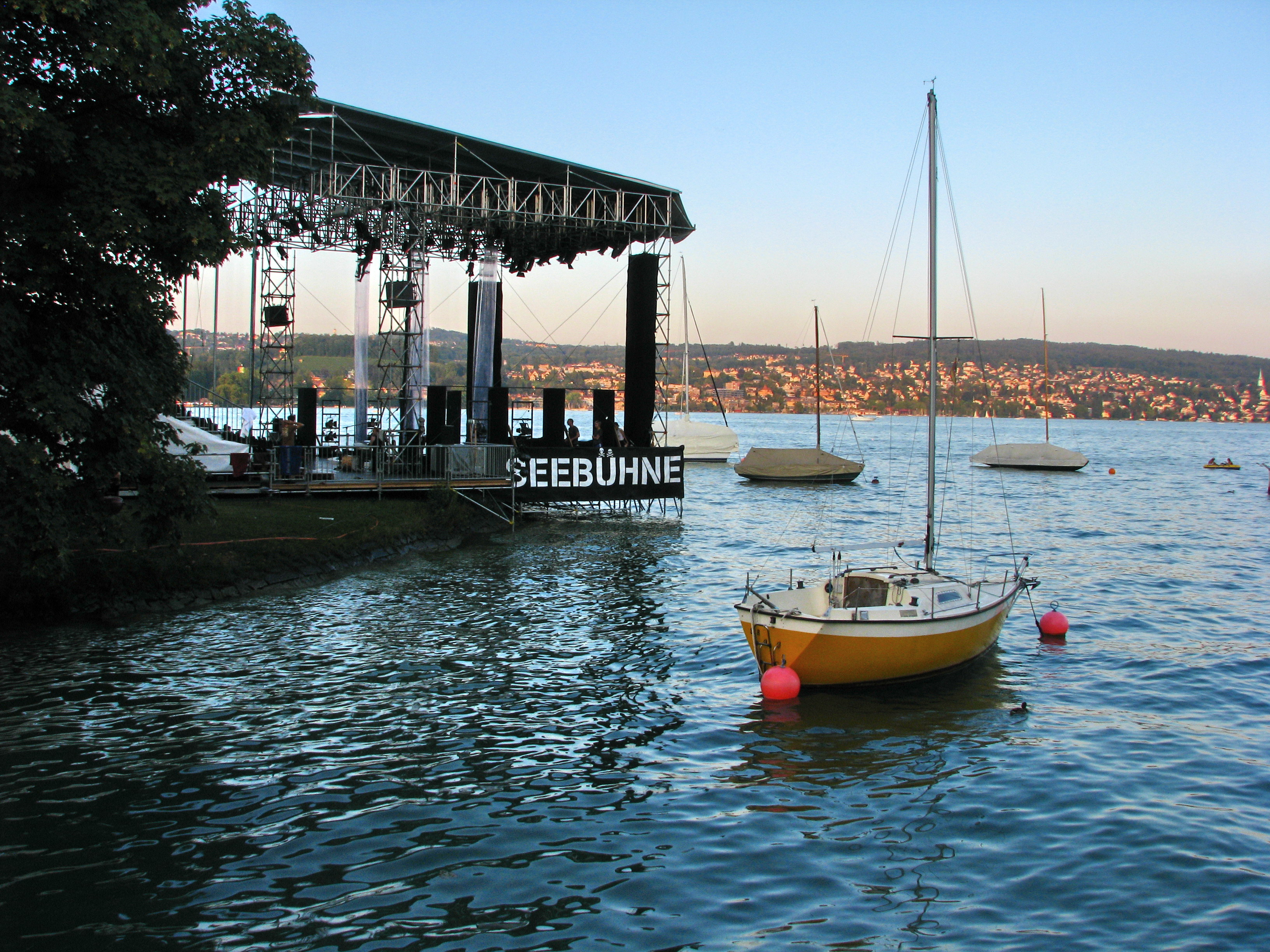
One of the numerous acts at Zürcher Theater Spektakel (2009)

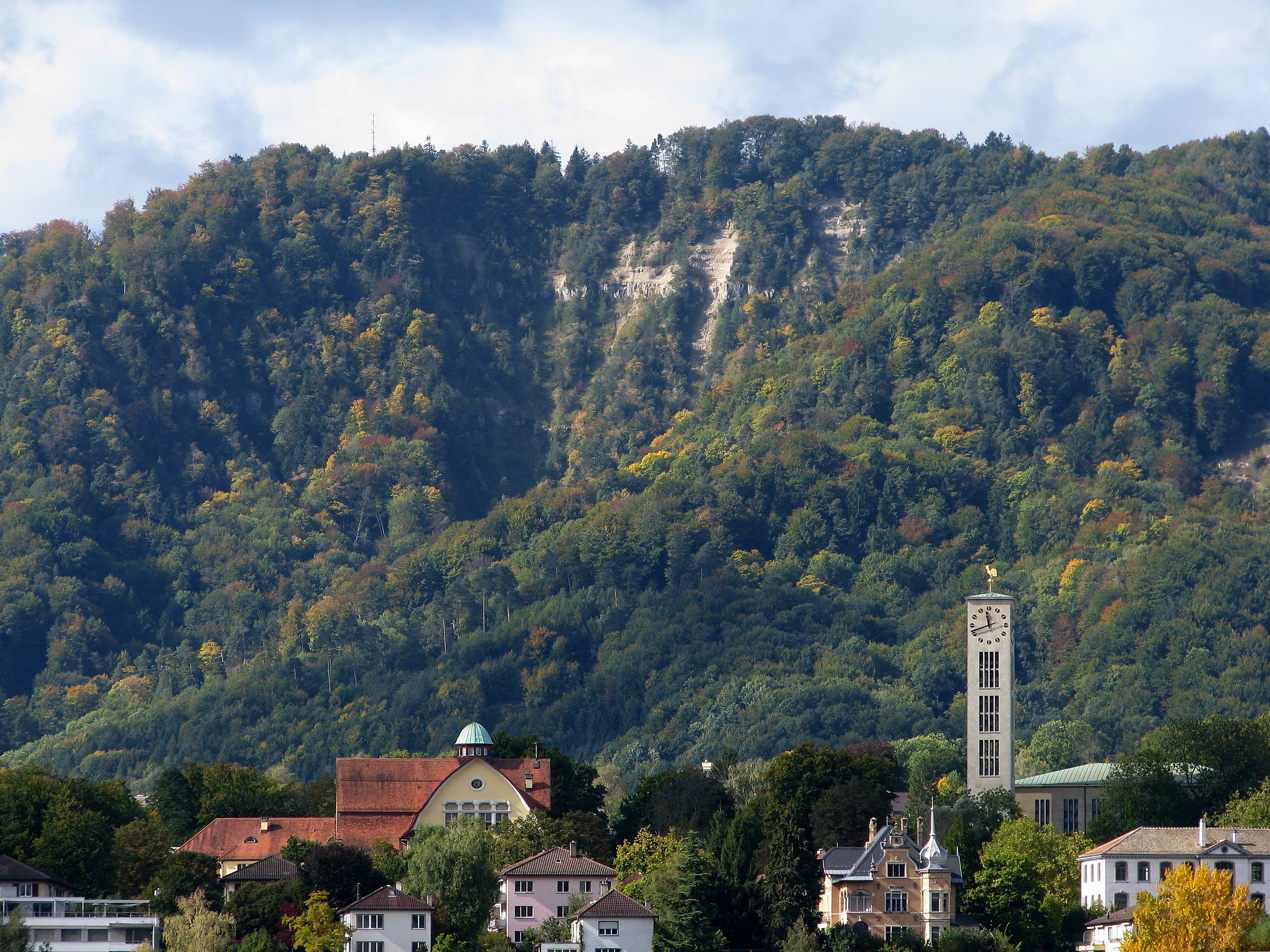
So-called Fallätsche (Albis hills)

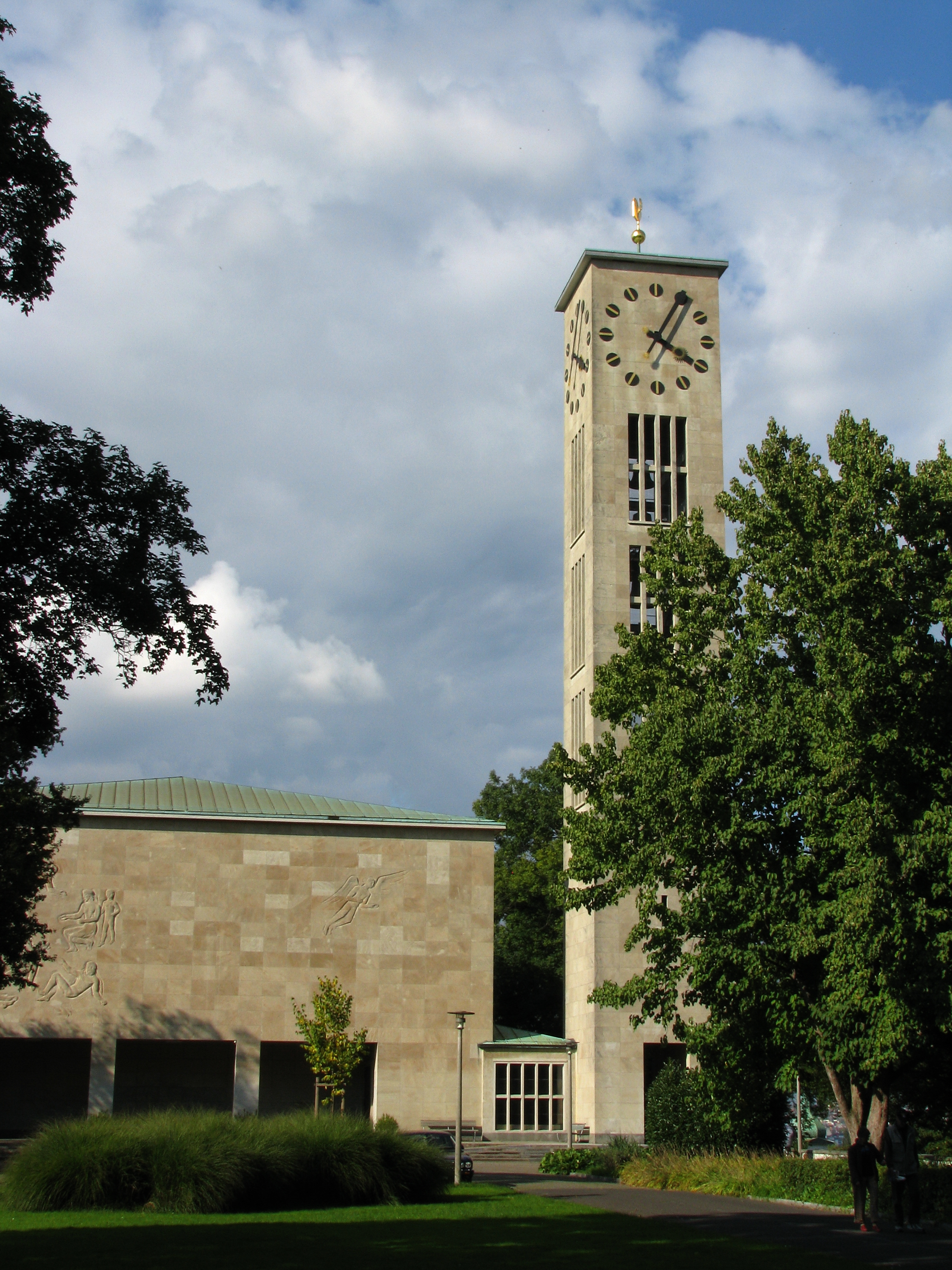
New church Wollishofen

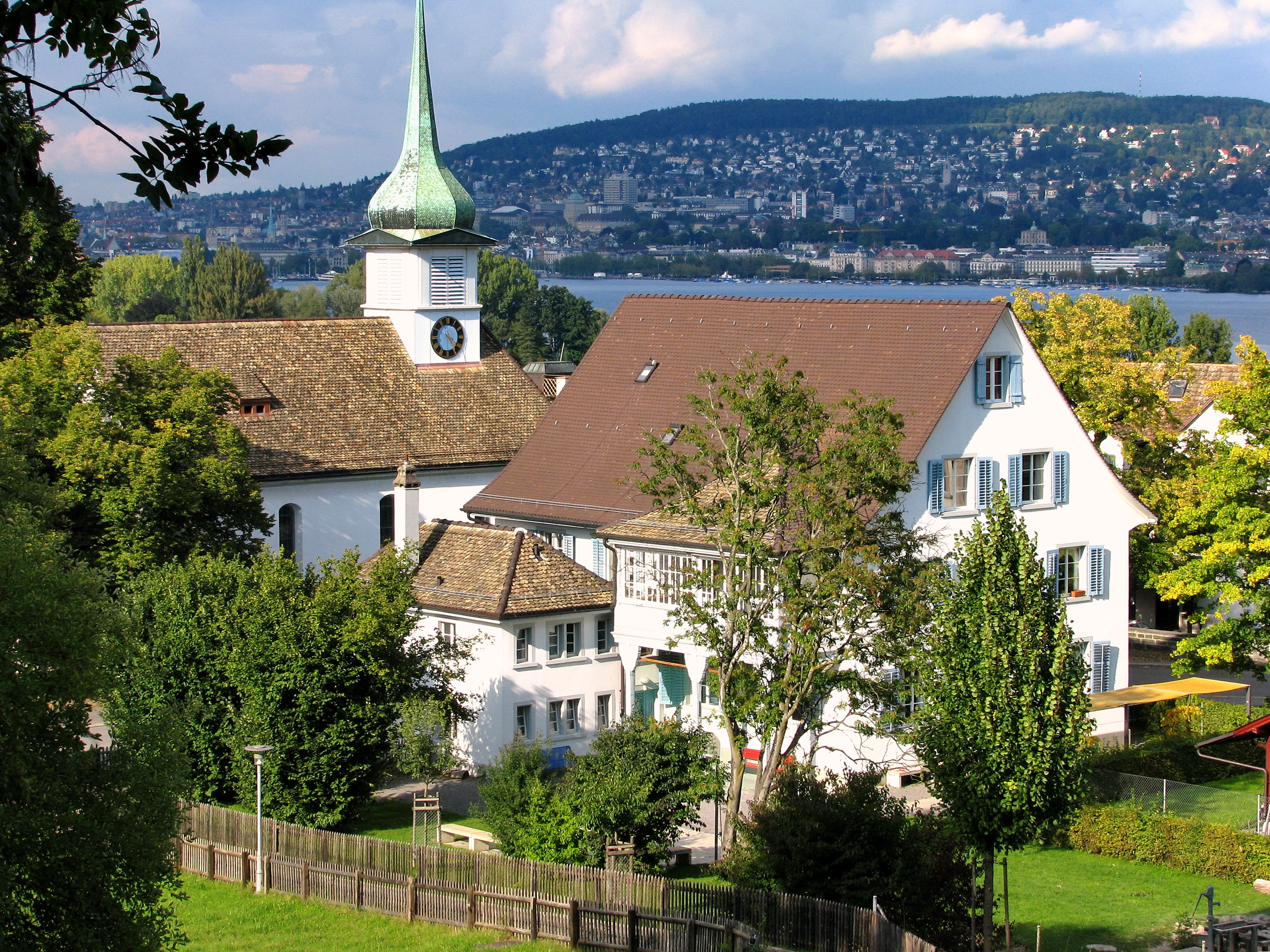
Old church seen from New church Wollishofen

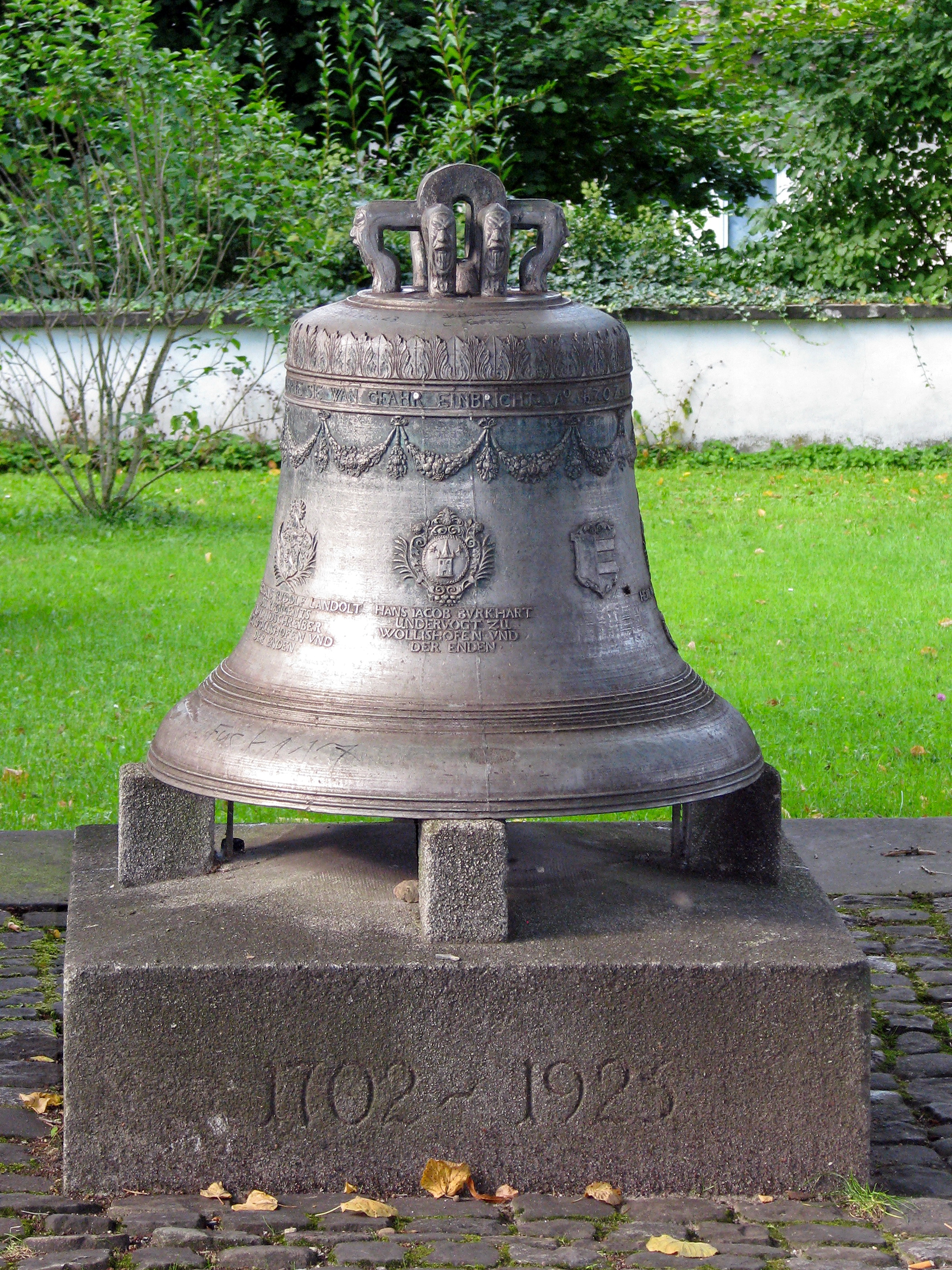
Chur bell of 1702
