= District 2 (Zurich) =

Coordinates: 47.337°N 8.521°E

Kreis 2 District of the city of Zurich
- District
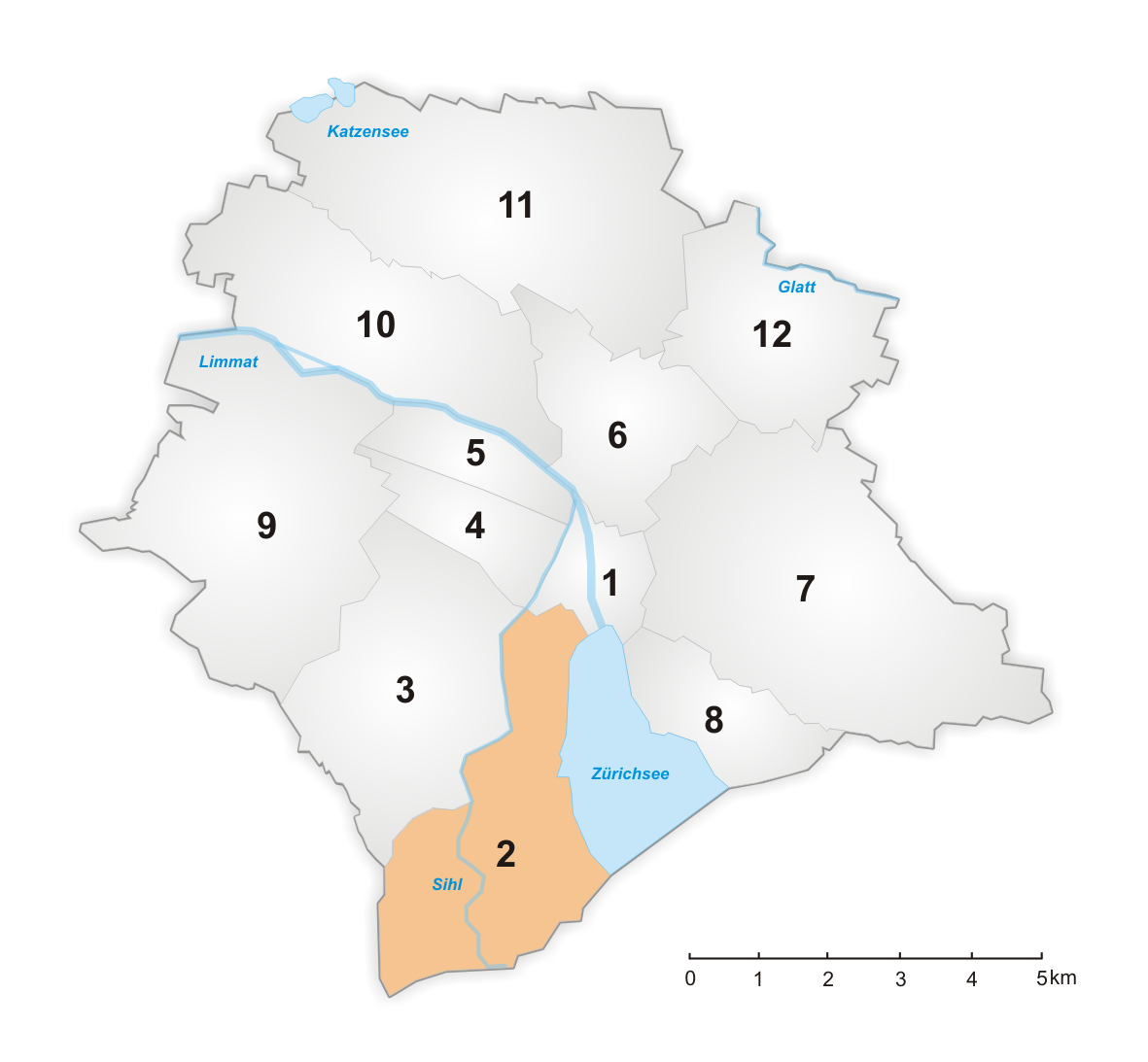
- Country: Switzerland
- Canton: Zurich
- City: Zurich

Area
  - Total: 11.1 km^{2} (4.3 sq mi)

Population (31. Dec. 2005)
  - Total: 28,834
  - Density: 2,605/km^{2} (6,750/sq mi)
- District Number: 2
- Quarters: Wollishofen; Leimbach; Enge

District 2 is a district on the western side of Lake Zurich in the Swiss city of Zurich.

The district comprises the quarters Wollishofen, Leimbach and Enge.
