= 1907 Southern Intercollegiate Athletic Association football season =

- League: NCAA
- Sport: College football
- Duration: September 28, 1907 through December 25, 1907
- Teams: 14

Regular Season
- Season champions: Vanderbilt

Football seasons
- 1906 1908

1907 Southern Intercollegiate Athletic Association football standings
	Conf.					Overall
Team	W		L		T	W		L		T
Vanderbilt $	3	–	0	–	0	5	–	1	–	1
Sewanee	6	–	1	–	0	8	–	1	–	0
LSU	3	–	1	–	0	7	–	3	–	0
Alabama	3	–	1	–	2	5	–	1	–	2
Tennessee	3	–	2	–	0	7	–	2	–	1
Auburn	3	–	2	–	1	6	–	2	–	1
Georgia	3	–	3	–	1	4	–	3	–	1
Mississippi A&M	3	–	3	–	0	6	–	3	–	0
Georgia Tech	2	–	4	–	0	4	–	4	–	0
Clemson	1	–	3	–	0	4	–	4	–	0
Mercer	0	–	3	–	0	3	–	3	–	0
Howard (AL)	0	–	5	–	0	2	–	5	–	0
Ole Miss	0	–	5	–	0	0	–	6	–	0
Nashville			–					–
$ – Conference champion

The 1907 Southern Intercollegiate Athletic Association football season was the college football games played by the member schools of the Southern Intercollegiate Athletic Association as part of the 1907 college football season. The season began on September 28 with conference member Clemson hosting Gordon. Howard College was a new addition to the SIAA.

Vanderbilt gave a shock to the football world by tying Eastern power Navy 6–6. (Note: Navy was captained by Arch Douglas, the second player from the South to get third-team All-American honors from Walter Camp.) The Commodores also beat Georgia Tech by the largest margin in coach John Heisman's tenure, and beat a powerful Sewanee team on a double pass play which Grantland Rice called the greatest thrill in his years of watching sports. Innis Brown later wrote "Sewanee in all probability had the best team in the South." Dan McGugin in Spalding's Football Guide's summation of the season in the SIAA wrote "The standing. First, Vanderbilt; second, Sewanee, a might good second;" and that Aubrey Lanier "came near winning the Vanderbilt game by his brilliant dashes after receiving punts." The only loss suffered all season for Vanderbilt was to Western power Michigan.

LSU made history by facing the University of Havana in Cuba, marking the first occasion a team from the American South competed in an international matchup.

== Results and team statistics ==
Conf. Rank	Team	Head coach	Overall record	Conf. record	PPG	PAG
1	Vanderbilt	Dan McGugin	5–1–1	3–0	34.6	5.1
2	Sewanee	Arthur G. Erwin	8–1	6–1	27.8	3.0
3	Alabama	Doc Pollard	5–1–2	3–1–2	8.8	8.0
4	LSU	Edgar Wingard	7–3	2–1	26.6	5.2
5 (tie)	Auburn	Willis Kienholz	6–2–1	3–2–1	20.6	3.3
5 (tie)	Tennessee	George Levene	7–2–1	3–2	16.9	1.7
7	Georgia	W. S. Whitney	4–3–1	3–3–1	12.9	5.9
8	Mississippi A&M	Fred Furman	6–3	2–3	23.3	8.6
9	Georgia Tech	John Heisman	4–4	2–4	18.5	12.5
10	Clemson	Frank Shaughnessy	4–4	1–3	8.4	5.6
11	Mercer	H. R. Schenker	3–3	0–3		
12	Howard	John Counselman	2-5	0–5		
13	Mississippi	Frank A. Mason	0–6	0–5	1.0	32.5
14	Nashville					

Key

PPG = Average of points scored per game
PAG = Average of points allowed per game

== Regular season ==
Index to colors and formatting
Non-conference matchup; SIAA member won
Non-conference matchup; SIAA member lost
Non-conference matchup; tie
Conference matchup

SIAA teams in bold.

=== Week One ===
Date	Visiting team	Home team	Site	Result	Attendance	Reference
September 27	Mooney	**Sewanee**	Hardee Field • Sewanee, TN	**W** 23–0		
September 28	Gordon	**Clemson**	Bowman Field • Calhoun, SC	**W** 5–0		

=== Week Two ===
Date	Visiting team	Home team	Site	Result	Attendance	Reference
October 2	Southwestern Presbyterian	Mississippi A&M	Hardy Field • Starkville, MS	**W** 7–0		
October 3	Southwestern Presbyterian	Howard (AL)	West End Park • Birmingham, AL	**W** 5–0		
October 5	Maryville (TN)	Alabama	The Quad • Tuscaloosa, AL	**W** 17–0		
October 5	**Howard (AL)**	Auburn	Drill Field • Auburn, AL	**AUB** 23–0		
October 5	North Georgia	Georgia	Herty Field • Athens, GA	**W** 57–0		
October 5	Gordon	Georgia Tech	The Flats • Atlanta, GA	**W** 51–0		
October 5	Tennessee Military Institute	Tennessee	Chilhowee Park • Knoxville, TN	**W** 30–0		
October 5	Kentucky State College	Vanderbilt	Dudley Field • Nashville, TN	**W** 40–0	1,800	
October 7	Maryville (TN)	Auburn	Drill Field • Auburn, AL	**W** 29–0		

=== Week Three ===
Date	Visiting team	Home team	Site	Result	Attendance	Reference
October 9	Maryville	**Clemson**	Bowman Field • Calhoun, SC	**W** 35–0		
October 10	**Mississippi A&M**	**Sewanee**	Hardee Field • Sewanee, TN	**SEW** 38–0		
October 11	Louisiana Industrial	**LSU**	State Field • Baton Rouge, LA	**W** 28–0		
October 12	**Alabama**	**Ole Miss**	Columbus Fairgrounds • Columbus, MS	**ALA** 20–0		
October 12	North Georgia	**Georgia Tech**	The Flats • Atlanta, GA	**W** 70–0		
October 12	**Mississippi A&M**	**Howard (AL)**	West End Park • Birmingham, AL	**MSA&M** 12–5		
October 12	**Tennessee**	**Georgia**	Herty Field • Athens, GA	**TENN** 15–0		
October 12	**Vanderbilt**	Navy	Worden Field • Annapolis, MD	**T** 6–6		
October 12	Florida	**Mercer**	Central City Park • Macon, GA	**W** 6–0		
October 12	Gordon	**Auburn**	Drill Field • Auburn, AL	**W** 34–0		

=== Week Four ===
Date	Visiting team	Home team	Site	Result	Attendance	Reference
October 19	**Georgia**	**Mercer**	Central City Park • Macon, GA	**UGA** 26–6		
October 19	**Tennessee**	**Georgia Tech**	Ponce de Leon Park • Atlanta, GA	**GT** 6–4		
October 19	Southwestern Baptist	**Mississippi A&M**	Hardy Field • Starkville, MS	**W** 80–0		
October 19	Cape Girardeau Normal	**Ole Miss**	Oxford, MS	**L** 6–12		
October 19	**Sewanee**	**Auburn**	West End Park • Birmingham, AL	**SEW** 12–6		
October 19	**LSU**	Texas	Clark Field • Austin, TX	**L** 5–12		
October 21	**Sewanee**	**Alabama**	The Quad • Tuscaloosa, AL	**SEW** 54–4		
October 21	**Tennessee**	**Clemson**	Bowman Field • Calhoun, SC	**TENN** 4–0		
October 21	**LSU**	Texas A&M	Kyle Field • College Station, TX	**L** 5–11		

=== Week Five ===
Date	Visiting team	Home team	Site	Result	Attendance	Reference
October 25	**Mercer**	Mississippi A&M	Columbus Fairgrounds • Columbus, MS	**MSA&M** 75–0		
October 25	**Georgia**	Alabama	Highland Park • Montgomery, AL	**T** 0–0		
October 26	**Auburn**	Georgia Tech	Ponce de Leon Park • Atlanta, GA	**AUB** 12–6		
October 26	**Sewanee**	Ole Miss	Varsity Park • Memphis, TN	**SEW** 65–0		
October 26	Maryville (TN)	Tennessee	Chilhowee Park • Knoxville, TN	**W** 34–0		
October 26	Rose Polytechnic	Vanderbilt	Dudley Field • Nashville, TN	**W** 65–10		
October 28	**Howard (AL)**	LSU	State Field • Baton Rouge, LA	**LSU** 57–0		

=== Week Six ===
Date	Visiting team	Home team	Site	Result	Attendance	Reference
October 31	Drury	**Mississippi A&M**	Hardy Field • Starkville, MS	**W** 6–0		
October 31	North Carolina	**Clemson**	Columbia, SC	**W** 15–6		
November 1	**Howard (AL)**	Gordon	Barnesville, GA	**L** 0–11		
November 2	**Howard (AL)**	**Mercer**	Central City Park • Macon, GA	**MER** 11–6		
November 2	Centre	**Alabama**	State Fairgrounds • Birmingham, AL	**W** 12–0		
November 2	**Clemson**	**Auburn**	Drill Fielf • Auburn, AL	**AUB** 12–0	1,000	
November 2	**Georgia**	**Georgia Tech**	Ponce de Leon Park • Atlanta, GA	**GT** 10–6		
November 2	Michigan	**Vanderbilt**	Dudley Field • Nashville, TN	**L** 0–8		
November 2	**Sewanee**	Virginia	Lafayette Field • Norfolk, VA	**W** 12–0	1,000	
November 2	Chattanooga	**Tennessee**	Chilhowee Park • Knoxville, TN	**W** 57–0		

=== Week Seven ===
Date	Visiting team	Home team	Site	Result	Attendance	Reference
November 6	Arkansas	LSU	State Field • Baton Rouge, LA	**W** 17–12		
November 7	**Clemson**	Georgia	Georgia-Carolina Fair Grounds • Augusta, GA	**UGA** 8–0		
November 9	**Mercer**	Auburn	Drill Field • Auburn, AL	**AUB** 63–0		
November 9	Davidson	Clemson	Bowman Field • Calhoun, SC	**L** 6–10		
November 9	Kentucky State College	Tennessee	Chilhowee Park • Knoxville, TN	**T** 0–0		
November 9	**Mississippi A&M**	LSU	State Field • Baton Rouge, LA	**LSU** 23–11		
November 9	**Sewanee**	Georgia Tech	Ponce de Leon Park • Atlanta, GA	**SEW** 18–0		
November 9	**Ole Miss**	Vanderbilt	Dudley Field • Nashville, TN	**VAN** 60–0		
November 11	**Sewanee**	Georgia	Herty Field • Athens, GA	**SEW** 16–0		

=== Week Eight ===
Date	Visiting team	Home team	Site	Result	Attendance	Reference
November 16	**Howard (AL)**	Chattanooga	Olympic Park Field • Chattanooga, TN	**W** 21-7		
November 16	**Auburn**	**Alabama**	State Fairgrounds • Birmingham, AL	**T** 6–6		
November 16	Gordon	**Mercer**	Central City Park • Macon, GA	**W** 5–0		
November 16	**LSU**	**Ole Miss**	League Park • Jackson, MS	**LSU** 23–0	5,000	
November 16	**Mississippi A&M**	**Tennessee**	Driving Park • Memphis, TN	**TENN** 11–4		
November 16	**Georgia Tech**	**Vanderbilt**	Dudley Field • Nashville, TN	**VAN** 54–0		
November 18	**Tennessee**	Arkansas	West End Park • Little Rock, AR	**W** 14–2		

=== Week Nine ===
Date	Visiting team	Home team	Site	Result	Attendance	Reference
November 23	**LSU**	**Alabama**	Monroe Park • Mobile, AL	**ALA** 6–4		
November 23	**Sewanee**	**Vanderbilt**	Dudley Field • Nashville, TN	**VAN** 17–12		
November 23	**Howard (AL)**	Birmingham	West End Park • Birmingham, AL	**W** 83–0		

=== Week Ten ===
Date	Visiting team	Home team	Site	Result	Attendance	Reference
November 28	**Tennessee**	**Alabama**	State Fairgrounds • Birmingham, AL	**ALA** 5–0		
November 28	**Clemson**	**Georgia Tech**	Ponce de Leon Park • Atlanta, GA	**CLEM** 6–5		
November 28	**Auburn**	**Georgia**	Central City Park • Macon, GA	**UGA** 6–0		
November 28	**Ole Miss**	**Mississippi A&M**	League Park • Jackson, MS	**MSA&M** 15–0		
November 28	Baylor	**LSU**	State Field • Baton Rouge, LA	**W** 48–0		

== Bowl games ==
Date	Bowl Game	Site	SIAA Team	Opponent	Score	Reference
December 25, 1907	Bacardi Bowl	La Tropical Stadium • Havana, Cuba	LSU	Havana University	LSU 56–0	

== Awards and honors ==
=== All-Americans ===
- E - Bob Blake, Vanderbilt (FY-1, AFR)
- C - Stein Stone, Vanderbilt (AFR)

=== All-Southern team ===
The consensus All-Southern team:

Position	Name	First-team selectors	Team
QB	Sam Costen		Vanderbilt
HB	Honus Craig		Vanderbilt
HB	Aubrey Lanier		Sewanee
FB	Lawrence Markley		Sewanee
E	Bob Blake		Vanderbilt'
T	Lex Stone		Sewanee
G	Frank Faulkinberry		Sewanee
C	Stein Stone		Vanderbilt
G	Horace Sherrell		Vanderbilt
T	J. R. Davis		Georgia Tech
E	Guy Lewis		Sewanee
