= 1907 Sewanee Tigers football team =

American college football season

1907 Sewanee Tigers football
- Conference: Southern Intercollegiate Athletic Association
- Record: 8–1 (6–1 SIAA)
- Head coach: Arthur G. Erwin (1st season)
- Captain: Walter Barrett
- Home stadium: Hardee Field

1907 Southern Intercollegiate Athletic Association football standings
	Conf.					Overall
Team	W		L		T	W		L		T
Vanderbilt $	3	–	0	–	0	5	–	1	–	1
Sewanee	6	–	1	–	0	8	–	1	–	0
LSU	3	–	1	–	0	7	–	3	–	0
Alabama	3	–	1	–	2	5	–	1	–	2
Tennessee	3	–	2	–	0	7	–	2	–	1
Auburn	3	–	2	–	1	6	–	2	–	1
Georgia	3	–	3	–	1	4	–	3	–	1
Mississippi A&M	3	–	3	–	0	6	–	3	–	0
Georgia Tech	2	–	4	–	0	4	–	4	–	0
Clemson	1	–	3	–	0	4	–	4	–	0
Mercer	0	–	3	–	0	3	–	3	–	0
Howard (AL)	0	–	5	–	0	2	–	5	–	0
Ole Miss	0	–	5	–	0	0	–	6	–	0
Nashville			–					–
$ – Conference champion

The 1907 Sewanee Tigers football team represented Sewanee: The University of the South during the 1907 Southern Intercollegiate Athletic Association football season. The team competed in the Southern Intercollegiate Athletic Association (SIAA) and was coached by Arthur G. Erwin in his first year as head coach, compiling a record of 8–1 (6–1 SIAA) and outscoring opponents 250 to 29. Vanderbilt coach Dan McGugin in Spalding's Football Guide's summation of the season in the SIAA wrote "The standing. First, Vanderbilt; second, Sewanee, a might good second;" and that Aubrey Lanier "came near winning the Vanderbilt game by his brilliant dashes after receiving punts."

Sewanee lost the effective SIAA championship game to Vanderbilt on a double pass play then thrown near the end zone by Bob Blake to Stein Stone. Honus Craig then ran in the winning touchdown. It was just the second year of the legal forward pass. The trick play was cited by Grantland Rice as the greatest thrill he ever witnessed in his years of watching sports. Innis Brown later wrote "Sewanee in all probability had the best team in the South."

== Schedule ==
Date	Opponent	Site	Result	Attendance	Source
September 27	Mooney School*	Hardee Field; Sewanee, TN	W 23–0		
October 10	Mississippi A&M	Hardee Field; Sewanee, TN	W 38–0		
October 19	at Auburn	West End Park; Birmingham, AL	W 12–6		
October 21	at Alabama	The Quad; Tuscaloosa, AL	W 54–4		
October 26	vs. Ole Miss	Varsity Park; Memphis, TN	W 65–0		
November 2	at Virginia*	Lafayette Field; Norfolk, VA	W 12–0	1,000	
November 9	at Georgia Tech	Ponce de Leon Park; Atlanta, GA	W 18–0		
November 11	at Georgia	Herty Field; Athens, GA	W 16–0		
November 28	at Vanderbilt	Dudley Field; Nashville, TN (rivalry)	L 12–17		
*Non-conference game

== Players ==
=== Line ===
Player	Position	Games started	Hometown	Prep school	Height	Weight	Age
Silas Williams	End		Greenville, South Carolina		5'9"	150	19
Lex Stone	Tackle		Fayetteville, Tennessee		6'2"	172	22
Eric Cheape	Guard		Avon Park, Florida		6'1"	170	21
Thomas Evans	Center		Parral, Mexico		6'1"	160	20
Frank Faulkinberry	Guard		Fayetteville, Tennessee		6'4"	198	19
William Evans	Tackle		Parral, Mexico		5'11"	180	19
Guy Lewis	End		Dallas, Texas		5'11"	165	22

=== Backfield ===
Player	Position	Games started	Hometown	Prep school	Height	Weight	Age
Walter Barrett	Quarterback		Covington, Tennessee	Mooney	5'10"	155	22
Frank Shipp	Halfback		Chattanooga, Tennessee		5'11"	170	25
Aubrey Lanier	Halfback		Butler, Arkansas		5'10"	160	19
Lawrence Markley	Fullback		Chicago		5'10"	165	22

=== Subs ===
Player	Position	Hometown	Prep school	Height	Weight	Age
C. Logan Eisele	Back	Denver, Colorado		6'0"	160	19
Kenneth Lyne	Back	Henderson, Kentucky		5'10"	146	19
William Wilson	End	Rock Hill, South Carolina		5'10"	144	22
Heber Wadley	Line	Shreveport, Louisiana		6'2"	170	21
Paul Sheppard	Line	Texarkana, Texas		5'11"	170	23

== See also ==
- 1907 College Football All-Southern Team
