= Kemp Lewis =

American football player, coach, and engineer (1883–1957)

Biographical details
- Born: February 21, 1883; Lancaster, Texas, U.S.
- Died: September 11, 1957 (aged 74); Houston, Texas, U.S.

Playing career
- 1906–1907: Sewanee
- Position: End

Coaching career (HC unless noted)
- 1910: TCU

Head coaching record
- Overall: 2–6–1

Accomplishments and honors

Awards
- All-Southern (1907)

Howard Guy "Kemp" Lewis (February 21, 1883 – September 11, 1957), also known as Guy Lewis, was an American college football player and coach and engineer. He played end at Sewanee: The University of the South in 1906 and 1907 and was selected to the 1907 College Football All-Southern Team. Kemp served as the head football coach at Texas Christian University (TCU) for one season, in 1910, compiling a record of 2–6–1. He "pioneered in the forward pass and the change in the shape of the ball from round to oval."

== Sewanee ==
Lewis was a prominent 5 feet 11 inches, 165-pound end for the Sewanee Tigers football team of Sewanee: The University of the South. He was from Dallas, Texas.

=== 1906 ===
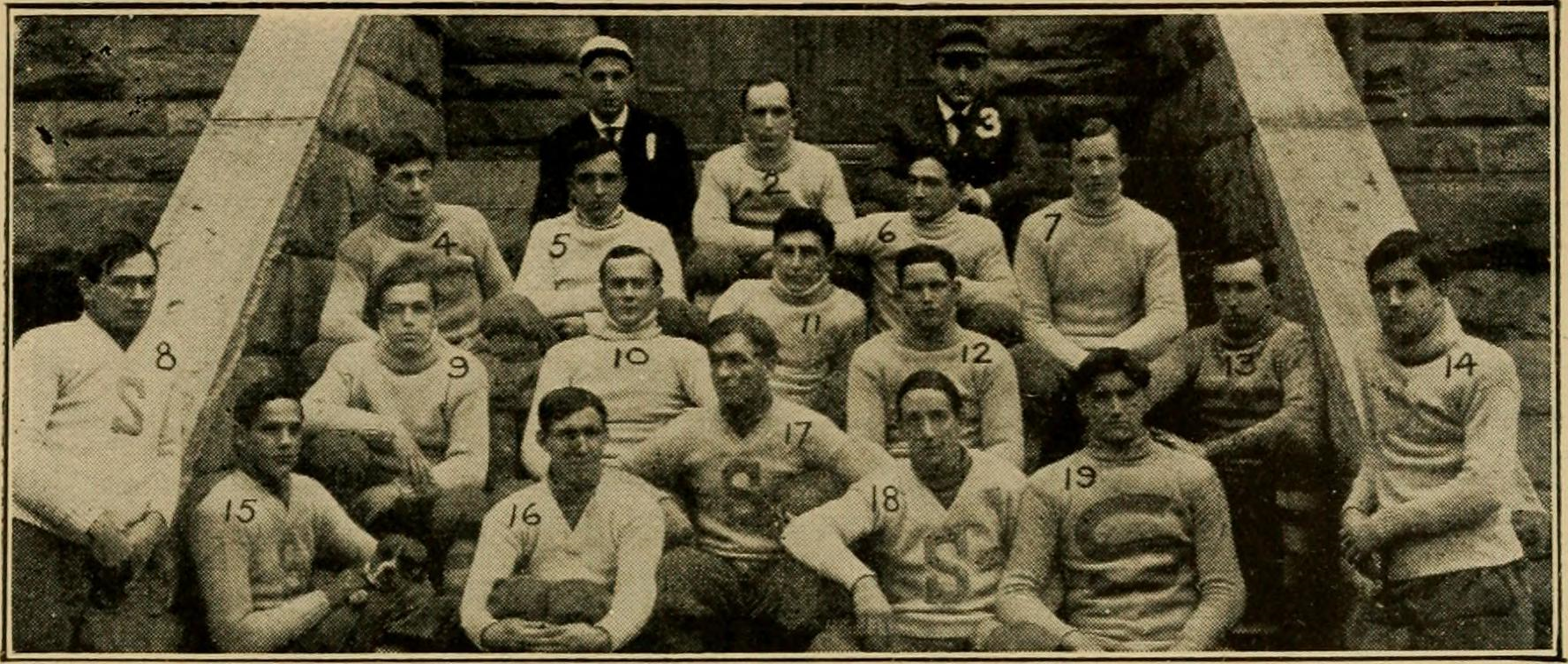
1906 Sewanee team, Lewis far left

Rival Vanderbilt coach Dan McGugin mentioned Lewis as one of the best ends in the South in 1906, but preferred moving running back Frank Shipp to end for his All-Southern team. That same season, Lewis caught a pass and ran 85 yards for a touchdown against Tulane.

=== 1907 ===
Lewis was selected All-Southern in 1907 for one of Sewanee's greatest teams. Sewanee lost the effective SIAA championship game to rival Vanderbilt on a double pass play then thrown near the end zone by Bob Blake to Stein Stone. Honus Craig then ran in the winning touchdown. It was just the second year of the legal forward pass. The trick play was cited by Grantland Rice as the greatest thrill he ever witnessed in his years of watching sports. Innis Brown later wrote "Sewanee in all probability had the best team in the South."

== TCU ==
After graduating from Sewanee, Lewis worked for the government as an engineer. In 1910, he was appointed the head football coach at Texas Christian University (TCU).

== Later life and death ==
Lewis moved to Houston around 1939 and worked with the United States Army Corps of Engineers there until retiring in 1953. He died at the age of 74, on September 11, 1957, at his home in Houston.

== Head coaching record ==
Year	Team	Overall	Conference	Standing	Bowl/playoffs
TCU (Texas Intercollegiate Athletic Association) (1910)
1910	TCU	2–6–1	0–1		
TCU:		2–6–1	0–1		
Total:		2–6–1			
