= 1907 College Football All-Southern Team =

American all-star college football team

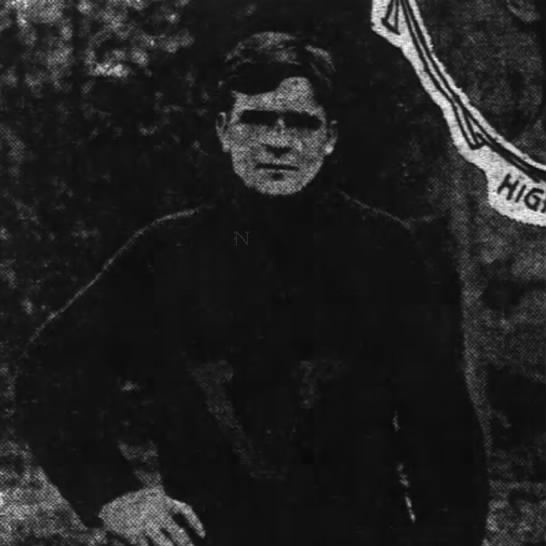
Honus Craig

The 1907 College Football All-Southern Team consists of American football players selected to the College Football All-Southern Teams selected by various organizations for the 1907 Southern Intercollegiate Athletic Association football season. Fielding Yost selected Bob Blake for his All-America first team. Vanderbilt won the SIAA championship.

== Consensus eleven ==
The eleven chosen by most selectors includes:

- Bob Blake, end for Vanderbilt, was a lawyer and Rhodes Scholar. He was selected for the Associated Press Southeast Area All-Time football team 1869-1919 era.
- Sam Costen, quarterback for Vanderbilt. Costen was rated as Barrett's superior though Costen spent a good part of the year injured.
- Honus Craig, halfback for Vanderbilt, Dan McGugin once called him the South's greatest athlete and Vanderbilt's greatest halfback. One report says "When Craig was confronted with the above formidable title yesterday by a reporter whose business it is to know such things, he blushed like a girl and tried to show why Dan McGugin's judgment is not always to be trusted." In Craig's opinion, Bob Blake was the South's greatest player.
- J. R. Davis, tackle for Georgia Tech; Davis was known as "Twenty percent" because he was considered twenty percent of the team's worth.
- Frank Faulkinberry, tackle for Sewanee, later a coach.
- Aubrey Lanier, halfback for Sewanee. McGugin said of Lanier in 1907 that he was "a star of purest ray, and came near winning the Vanderbilt game by his brilliant dashes after receiving punts."
- Kemp Lewis end for Sewanee
- Lawrence Markley, fullback for Sewanee.
- Horace Sherrell, guard for Vanderbilt. Against Kentucky State in 1907; "On one of Craig's long runs Sherrell, who was only a sub last year, kept pace with the fast half back all the way, knocking down three tacklers en route to the goal."
- Lex Stone, tackle for Sewanee, coached football and basketball at the University of Tennessee. He was the school's first basketball coach.
- Stein Stone, center for Vanderbilt, an all-time great at Vanderbilt who coached football one year at Clemson. He was an engineer.

== All-Southerns of 1907 ==
=== Ends ===
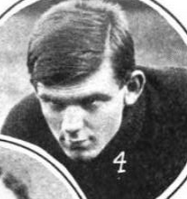
Bob Blake.

- Bob Blake†, Vanderbilt (C, DM, H, D, NB, NY)
- Kemp Lewis, Sewanee (C, DM, H, D, NB)
- Henry Cabell Maddux Jr., Virginia (NY)

=== Tackles ===
- Lex Stone†, Sewanee (C, DM, H, D, NB, NY)
- J. R. Davis, Georgia Tech (C, DM, H)
- Mac McLaurin, Clemson (H [as g], D)
- R. T. Gaston, Clemson (H [as g])
- Sadler, North Carolina A & M (NY)

=== Guards ===
- Frank Faulkinberry, Sewanee (C, DM, D, NB [as T])
- Horace Sherrell, Vanderbilt (C, DM, NB)
- Roscoe Word, Tennessee (NB)
- J. G. Davis, Auburn (D)
- Harwood Beebe, North Carolina A & M (NY)
- Hoss Hodgson, VPI (NY)

=== Centers ===
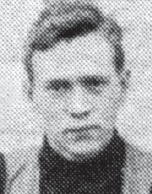
Stein Stone

- Stein Stone, Vanderbilt (C, DM, H, D, NB)
- William Gloth, Virginia (NY)

=== Quarterbacks ===
- Sam Costen, Vanderbilt (C, DM, NY [as hb])
- Walter Barrett, Sewanee (H, D)
- Sam Honaker, Virginia (NY)

=== Halfbacks ===
- Honus Craig†, Vanderbilt (C, DM, H, D, NB, NY)
- Aubrey Lanier, Sewanee (C, DM, H [as fb], D, NB [as fb])
- Frank Shipp, Sewanee (NB)
- Vin Campbell, Vanderbilt (H)

=== Fullbacks ===
- Lawrence Markley, Sewanee (C, DM, D, NB [as qb])
- L. E. Hughes, Auburn (D)
- George Dutcher, Georgetown (NY)

== Key ==
Bold = consensus choice by a majority of the selectors

† = Unanimous selection

C = selected by a consensus of newspapers, as published in Fuzzy Woodruff's A History of Southern Football

DM = All-SIAA eleven selected by Dan McGugin, coach at Vanderbilt University, for Spalding's Football Guide.

H = selected by John Heisman, coach at the Georgia Institute of Technology.

D = selected by Mike Donahue, coach at Auburn University.

NB = selected by former Tennessee player Nash Buckingham in the Memphis Commercial Appeal.

NY = selected by "a well-known New York authority on sports."

== See also ==
- 1907 College Football All-America Team
