= 1907 Vanderbilt Commodores football team =

American college football season

1907 Vanderbilt Commodores football

SIAA champion
- Conference: Southern Intercollegiate Athletic Association
- Record: 5–1–1 (3–0 SIAA)
- Head coach: Dan McGugin (4th season)
- Offensive scheme: Short punt
- Captain: Bob Blake
- Home stadium: Dudley Field

1907 Southern Intercollegiate Athletic Association football standings
	Conf.					Overall
Team	W		L		T	W		L		T
Vanderbilt $	3	–	0	–	0	5	–	1	–	1
Sewanee	6	–	1	–	0	8	–	1	–	0
LSU	3	–	1	–	0	7	–	3	–	0
Alabama	3	–	1	–	2	5	–	1	–	2
Tennessee	3	–	2	–	0	7	–	2	–	1
Auburn	3	–	2	–	1	6	–	2	–	1
Georgia	3	–	3	–	1	4	–	3	–	1
Mississippi A&M	3	–	3	–	0	6	–	3	–	0
Georgia Tech	2	–	4	–	0	4	–	4	–	0
Clemson	1	–	3	–	0	4	–	4	–	0
Mercer	0	–	3	–	0	3	–	3	–	0
Howard (AL)	0	–	5	–	0	2	–	5	–	0
Ole Miss	0	–	5	–	0	0	–	6	–	0
Nashville			–					–
$ – Conference champion

The 1907 Vanderbilt Commodores football team represented Vanderbilt University during the 1907 Southern Intercollegiate Athletic Association football season. The team's head coach was Dan McGugin, who served his fourth season in that capacity. Members of the Southern Intercollegiate Athletic Association, the Commodores played five home games in Nashville, Tennessee and finished the season with a record 5–1–1 and 3–0 in SIAA.

Vanderbilt shocked the football world when they tied 6-6 with the Eastern power Navy Midshipmen. The Commodores then went on to beat Georgia Tech Yellow Jackets by the record margin under coach John Heisman's tenure, followed by another victory over a powerful Sewanee Tigers team on a double pass play which Grantland Rice famously called the "greatest thrill" during his time as a sportswriter. The only loss they suffered that season came against the Western power Michigan Wolverines.

== Schedule ==
Date	Opponent	Site	Result	Attendance	Source
October 5	Kentucky State College*	Dudley Field; Nashville, TN (rivalry)	W 40–0	1,800	
October 12	at Navy*	Worden Field; Annapolis, MD	T 6–6		
October 26	Rose Polytechnic*	Dudley Field; Nashville, TN	W 65–10		
November 2	Michigan*	Dudley Field; Nashville, TN	L 0–8	8,000	
November 9	Ole Miss	Dudley Field; Nashville, TN (rivalry)	W 60–0		
November 16	Georgia Tech^{†}	Dudley Field; Nashville, TN (rivalry)	W 54–0		
November 28	Sewanee	Dudley Field; Nashville, TN (rivalry)	W 17–12		
*Non-conference game; ^{†}Homecoming

== Game summaries ==
=== Week 1: Kentucky State College ===
Vanderbilt opened the season with a 40–0 defeat of Kentucky State College, boosting morale. 1,800 people attended the game.

The starting lineup against Kentucky State: V. Blake (left end), McLain (left tackle), Sherrill (left guard), Stone (center), King (right guard), Hasslock (right tackle), B. Blake (right end), Costen (quarterback), Campbell (left halfback), Craig (right halfback), Morton (fullback).

=== Week 2: at Navy ===
Vanderbilt at Navy

Team	1	2	Total
Vanderbilt	0	6	6
Navy	6	0	6

- Date: October 12
- Location: Worden Field • Annapolis, Maryland
- Game start: 2:30 p. m.
- Referee: Tyler

The Commodores held the Navy team to a 6–6 tie in one of the highlights of the season. McGugin proved prophetic; before the game he said "We have an even chance with the Navy." The Nashville papers said Vandy should've won, and Grantland Rice criticized the officiating, as did coach McGugin. Navy's captain Tootsie Douglas called the tie "the bitterest pill I have ever had to swallow."

The starting lineup against Navy: V. Blake (left end), McLain (left tackle), Sherrill (left guard), Stone (center), King (right guard), Hasslock (right tackle), B. Blake (right end), Costen (quarterback), Campbell (left halfback), Craig (right halfback), Morton (fullback).

=== Week 3: Rose Polytechnic ===
Vanderbilt beat Rose Polytechnic 65–10.

=== Week 4: Michigan ===
Michigan at Vanderbilt

Team	1	2	Total
• Michigan	8	0	8
Vanderbilt	0	0	0

- Date: November 2
- Location: Dudley Field • Nashville, Tennessee
- Game attendance: 8,000
- Referee: Bradley Walker

Vanderbilt's only loss was the first home loss in three years, and only the third in the four years of Dan McGugin's coaching career at Vanderbilt —and all were to Michigan teams. The Commodores had a 26-game home win streak until Michigan stopped them on November 2. The Commodores lost to the Michigan Wolverines 8–0, in front of a crowd of 8,000 at Dudley Field in Nashville, snapping a 26-game home win streak. The crowd was the largest up to that date to see a football game south of the Mason–Dixon line. The game was "a big society event in the south", and the elite of Nashville, Chattanooga, and Memphis were in attendance. (Note: Students from every college and preparatory school in Tennessee, including Belmont College and "other seminaries", also attended the game.) The game matched Michigan head coach Fielding H. Yost against his former player and brother-in-law, Dan McGugin. Owing to the relationship between Yost and McGugin, the two teams played nine times between 1905 and 1923, with Michigan winning eight games and tying one.

The game was played under clear skies and warm weather, the temperature being too warm "for the invaders' liking." "Octy" Graham scored all of Michigan's points, converting on two of three field goal attempts. The tide of the game was set when Vanderbilt's quarterback, Sam Costen, dropped six of the first punts he received.

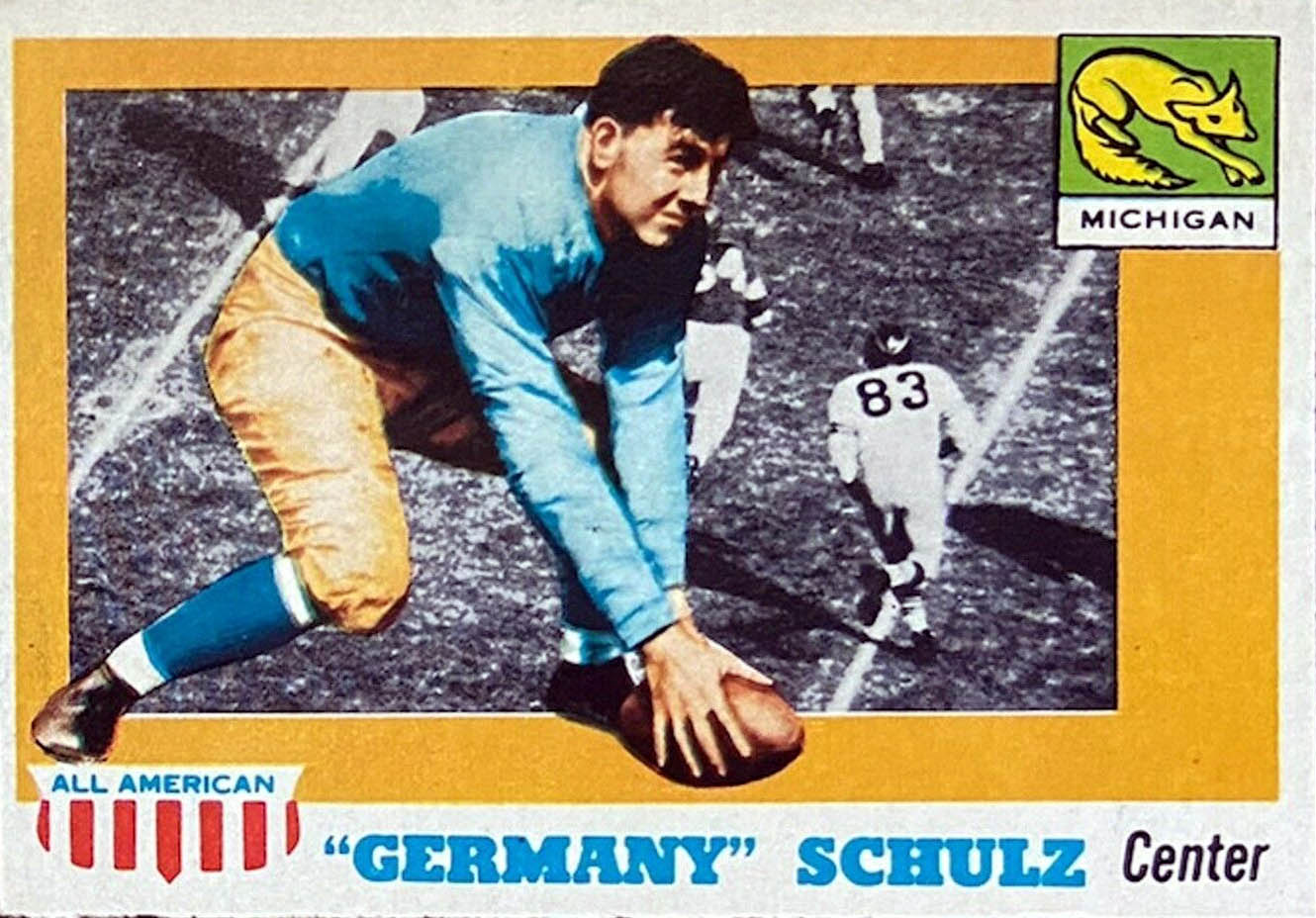
Germany Schulz depicted on a football card, c. 1955

The game most prominently featured a duel between star German centers. The Michigan Alumnus wrote: "'Germany' Schulz was far and away the star of the game. In his usual style he was in every play, tackling runners for loss, falling on the ball in fumbles, and opening wide holes in the line for Michigan gains. . . . [H]e showed conclusively that he has no equal in the keystone position." A Nashville source wrote "In the duel of centers, Stone of Vanderbilt, had the best of "Germany" Schulz. Michigan's massive center. Stone's play was spectacular all the way."

The starting lineup against Michigan: V. Blake (left end), McLain (left tackle), Sherrill (left guard), Stone (center), King (right guard), Hasslock (right tackle), B. Blake (right end), Costen (quarterback), Campbell (left halfback), Craig (right halfback), Morton (fullback).

=== Week 5: vs. Ole Miss ===
In a heavy rain, the Commodores defeated Ole Miss, 60–0. Vanderbilt had the substitutes in after ten minutes of play, and made ten touchdowns and ten goals.

The starting lineup against Mississippi: V. Blake (left end), McLain (left tackle), Sherrill (left guard), Stone (center), Hall (right guard), King (right tackle), B. Blake (right end), Costen (quarterback), Campbell (left halfback), Craig (right halfback), Morton (fullback).

=== Week 6: Georgia Tech ===
In the sixth week of play, Vanderbilt beat Georgia Tech by the largest margin in coach John Heisman's tenure, 54–0. "The rooters stridently called: "We want sixty! We want sixty!" According to sportswriter Grantland Rice, Heisman's team had a fine line but weak ends and backfield.

The highlight of the first half came on a triple pass. Sam Costen passed the ball to Honus Craig, Craig passed it to Morton and Morton passed it to Bob Blake, who ran to the side and passed it 25 yards back to Costen. Costen ran the remaining 20 yards for a touchdown.

Towards the end of the game, every regular with the exception of Stone was relieved with reserves.

The starting lineup against Georgia Tech: V. Blake (left end), McLain (left tackle), Sherrill (left guard), Stone (center), King (right guard), Hasslock (right tackle), B. Blake (right end), Costen (quarterback), Campbell (left halfback), Craig (right halfback), Morton (fullback).

=== Week 7: Sewanee ===
Sewanee at Vanderbilt

Team	1	2	Total
Sewanee	6	6	12
• Vanderbilt	11	6	17

- Date: November 28
- Location: Dudley Field • Nashville, Tennessee
- Game start: 2:15 p. m.
- Referee: Bradley Walker

Vanderbilt faced one of Sewanee's greatest teams in its annual rivalry game which would decide the SIAA championship. Vanderbilt won a close game 17–12.

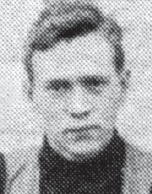
Stein Stone (pictured) caught the pass to beat Sewanee.

With the Commodores down 11–12, the game featured a 35-yard catch by Vanderbilt center Stein Stone, on a double-pass play then thrown near the end zone by Bob Blake that set up the 3-yard Honus Craig touchdown run to win at the very end. The double pass was cited by Grantland Rice as the greatest thrill he ever witnessed in his years of watching sports. McGugin in Spalding's Football Guide's summation of the season in the SIAA wrote "The standing. First, Vanderbilt; second, Sewanee, a mighty good second;" and that Sewanee back Aubrey Lanier "came near winning the Vanderbilt game by his brilliant dashes after receiving punts."

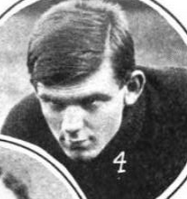
Bob Blake

The starting lineup against Sewanee: V. Blake (left end), McLain (left tackle), Sherrill (left guard), Stone (center), King (right guard), Hasslock (right tackle), B. Blake (right end), Costen (quarterback), Campbell (left halfback), Craig (right halfback), Morton (fullback).

== After the season ==
End Bob Blake made Walter Camp's All-America Honorable Mention, as well as the first team All-American selection of Michigan coach Fielding Yost. Sam Costen was elected captain for next year. Vandy claimed the championship of the South.

== Players ==
=== Depth chart ===
The following chart provides a visual depiction of Vanderbilt's lineup during the 1907 season with games started at the position reflected in parentheses. The chart mimics a short punt formation while on offense, with the quarterback under center.

LE
Vaughn Blake (6)
J. J. King (0)

LT	LG	C	RG	RT
Fatty McLain (6)	Horace Sherrell (6)	Stein Stone (6)	J. J. King (5)	Louis Hasslock (5)
		Fatty McLain (0)	Hall (1)	J. J. King (1)

RE
Bob Blake (6)

QB
Sam Costen (6)
Hugh Potts (0)

LHB	RHB
Vin Campbell (6)	Honus Craig (6)

FB
David Morton (6)

=== Varsity letterwinners ===
"Wearers of the V."

==== Line ====
Player	Position	Games started	Hometown	Prep school	Height	Weight	Age
Bob Blake	End	6	Cuero, Texas	Bowen School	6'0"	170	22
Vaughn Blake	End	6	Cuero, Texas	Bowen School		160	19
Louis Hasslock	Guard	5	Nashville, Tennessee	Montgomery Bell Academy		173	19
J. J. King	End, tackle, guard	6	Louisville, Kentucky				
Fatty McLain	Guard	6	Gloster, Mississippi			196	22
Horace Sherrell	Guard	6	Dellrose, Tennessee				21
Stein Stone	Center	6	Nashville, Tennessee	Mooney School	6'3"	180	25

==== Backfield ====
Player	Position	Games started	Hometown	Prep school	Height	Weight	Age
Vin Campbell	Halfback	6	St. Louis, Missouri		6'0"	185	19
Sam Costen	Quarterback	6	McKenzie, Tennessee				25
Honus Craig	Halfback	6	Culleoka, Tennessee	Branham & Hughes School	5'9"	165	25
David Morton	Fullback	6	Louisville, Kentucky	Branham & Hughes School			
Hugh F. Potts	Quarterback	0	Dallas, Texas	Webb School			

==== Unlisted ====
- Pickens
- Pittman
- Souby
- Stewart
- Williams

==== Staff ====
- H. E. Palmer, manager

== Bibliography ==
- Vanderbilt University (1908). Vanderbilt University Quarterly. Vol. 8.
