= Frank Blake (American football) =

American football coach (1883–1948)

Biographical details
- Born: September 28, 1883; Texas, U.S.
- Died: June 27, 1948 (aged 64); Midlothian, Texas, U.S.

Coaching career (HC unless noted)
- 1903–1904: Bowen School (TN)
- 1905–1907: Gordon Institute/College
- 1908–1909: Mercer
- 1911–1912: Bowen School (TN)

Head coaching record
- Overall: 6–9 (college)

Frank J. Blake (September 28, 1883 – June 27, 1948) was an American football coach and Federal Bureau of Investigation (FBI) agent. He served as the head football at Mercer University from 1908 to 1909. He was a graduate of Vanderbilt University. His brothers—Dan, Bob, and Vaughn—played football at Vanderbilt, although Frank never lettered for the Commodores.

Blake entered Vanderbilt University in 1900, and learned the game of football from Walter H. Watkins. He began his coaching career in 1903 at the Bowen School, a prep school in Nashville, Tennessee. In 1905, he moved to the Gordon Institute—now known as Gordon State College—in Barnesville, Georgia. Blake was hired as football coach at Mercer in 1908. In the summer of 1910, Blake was initially reported to have been selected to succeed Dexter W. Draper as head football coach at the University of Texas. However, he was only a candidate for the job, along with Cyril Ballin of Princeton, Clarence W. Russell, and Billy Wasmund. Blake returned to Bowen in 1911, where he coached the football team with Willis T. Stewart.

Blake joined the FBI in 1919, and became head of its Dallas office in 1921. He contributed to the arrest and conviction of Machine Gun Kelly. Blake retired from the FBI in 1942 after suffering a heart attack. He died on June 27, 1948, at his home in Midlothian, Texas.

== Head coaching record ==
=== College ===
Year	Team	Overall	Conference	Standing	Bowl/playoffs
Mercer Baptists (Southern Intercollegiate Athletic Association) (1908)
1908	Mercer	3–4	0–3	T–11th	
1909	Mercer	3–5	0–4	13th	
Mercer:		6–9	0–7		
Total:		6–9			
