= Horace Sherrell =

American football player, politician (1886–1940)

Profile
- Position: Guard

Personal information
- Born: January 23, 1886; Dellrose, Tennessee, U.S.
- Died: December 23, 1940 (aged 54); Fayetteville, Tennessee, U.S.

Career information
- College: Vanderbilt (1905–1907)

Awards and highlights
- SIAA championship (1906, 1907); All-Southern (1907)

Horace Everett Sherrell (January 23, 1886 – December 23, 1940) was an American college football player, politician, and merchant.

== College football career ==
Sherrell was a prominent guard for Dan McGugin's Vanderbilt Commodores football team of Vanderbilt University. He also played baseball.

Against Kentucky State in 1907; "On one of Craig's long runs Sherrell, who was only a sub last year, kept pace with the fast half back all the way, knocking down three tacklers en route to the goal." Sherrell was selected All-Southern.

== Later life ==
Sherrell coached the football of the Pulaski Training School, in Pulaski, Tennessee, in 1908. He later served in the Tennessee House of Representatives and the Tennessee Senate. Sherrell died suddenly, on December 23, 1940.
