= 1907 Howard Crimson and Blue football team =

American college football season

1907 Howard Crimson and Blue football
- Conference: Southern Intercollegiate Athletic Association
- Record: 3–6 (0–5 SIAA)
- Head coach: John Counselman (2nd season)
- Home stadium: West End Park

1907 Southern Intercollegiate Athletic Association football standings
	Conf.					Overall
Team	W		L		T	W		L		T
Vanderbilt $	3	–	0	–	0	5	–	1	–	1
Sewanee	6	–	1	–	0	8	–	1	–	0
LSU	3	–	1	–	0	7	–	3	–	0
Alabama	3	–	1	–	2	5	–	1	–	2
Tennessee	3	–	2	–	0	7	–	2	–	1
Auburn	3	–	2	–	1	6	–	2	–	1
Georgia	3	–	3	–	1	4	–	3	–	1
Mississippi A&M	3	–	3	–	0	6	–	3	–	0
Georgia Tech	2	–	4	–	0	4	–	4	–	0
Clemson	1	–	3	–	0	4	–	4	–	0
Mercer	0	–	3	–	0	3	–	3	–	0
Howard (AL)	0	–	5	–	0	2	–	5	–	0
Ole Miss	0	–	5	–	0	0	–	6	–	0
Nashville			–					–
$ – Conference champion

The 1907 Howard Crimson and Blue football team represented Howard College (now known as Samford University) as a member of the Southern Intercollegiate Athletic Association (SIAA) during the 1907 college football season. Led by second-year head coach John Counselman, Howard compiled an overall record of 3–6, with a mark of 0–5 in conference play.

== Schedule ==
Date	Opponent	Site	Result	Source
October 3	Southwestern Presbyterian*	West End Park; Birmingham, AL	W 5–0	
October 5	at Auburn	Drill Field; Auburn, AL	L 0–23	
October 12	Mississippi A&M	West End Park; Birmingham, AL	L 5–12	
October 26	at Tulane	Athletic Park; New Orleans, LA	L 0–13	
October 28	at LSU	State Field; Baton Rouge, LA	L 0–57	
November 1	at Gordon*	Barnesville, GA	L 0–11	
November 2	at Mercer	Central City Park; Macon, GA	L 6–11	
November 16	at Chattanooga*	Olympic Park Field; Chattanooga, TN	W 21–7	
November 23	vs. Birmingham*	West End Park; Birmingham, AL	W 83–0	
*Non-conference game
