= 1907 Mississippi A&M Aggies football team =

American college football season

1907 Mississippi A&M Aggies football
- Conference: Southern Intercollegiate Athletic Association
- Record: 6–3 (3–3 SIAA)
- Head coach: Fred Furman (1st season)
- Home stadium: Hardy Field

1907 Southern Intercollegiate Athletic Association football standings
| | Conf. | | | | | Overall |
| Team | W | | L | | T | W | | L | | T |
|---|---|---|---|---|---|---|---|---|---|---|
| Vanderbilt $ | 3 | – | 0 | – | 0 | 5 | – | 1 | – | 1 |
| Sewanee | 6 | – | 1 | – | 0 | 8 | – | 1 | – | 0 |
| LSU | 3 | – | 1 | – | 0 | 7 | – | 3 | – | 0 |
| Alabama | 3 | – | 1 | – | 2 | 5 | – | 1 | – | 2 |
| Tennessee | 3 | – | 2 | – | 0 | 7 | – | 2 | – | 1 |
| Auburn | 3 | – | 2 | – | 1 | 6 | – | 2 | – | 1 |
| Georgia | 3 | – | 3 | – | 1 | 4 | – | 3 | – | 1 |
| Mississippi A&M | 3 | – | 3 | – | 0 | 6 | – | 3 | – | 0 |
| Georgia Tech | 2 | – | 4 | – | 0 | 4 | – | 4 | – | 0 |
| Clemson | 1 | – | 3 | – | 0 | 4 | – | 4 | – | 0 |
| Mercer | 0 | – | 3 | – | 0 | 3 | – | 3 | – | 0 |
| Howard (AL) | 0 | – | 5 | – | 0 | 2 | – | 5 | – | 0 |
| Ole Miss | 0 | – | 5 | – | 0 | 0 | – | 6 | – | 0 |
| Nashville | | | – | | | | | – |
$ – Conference champion

The 1907 Mississippi A&M Aggies football team represented The Agricultural and Mechanical College of the State of Mississippi (now known as Mississippi State University) as a member of the Southern Intercollegiate Athletic Association (SIAA) during the 1907 college football season. Led by first-year head coach Fred Furman, the Aggies compiled an overall record of 6–3, with a mark of 3–3 in conference play. Mississippi A&M played home games at the Hardy Field in Starkville, Mississippi.

== Schedule ==
| Date | Opponent | Site | Result | Source |
|---|---|---|---|---|
| October 2 | Southwestern Presbyterian* | Hardy Field; Starkville, MS | W 7–0 | |
| October 10 | at Sewanee | Hardee Field; Sewanee, TN | L 0–38 | |
| October 12 | at Howard (AL) | West End Park; Birmingham, AL | W 12–5 | |
| October 19 | Southwestern Baptist* | Hardy Field; Starkville, MS | W 80–0 | |
| October 25 | Mercer | Columbus Fairgrounds; Columbus, MS | W 75–0 | |
| October 31 | Drury* | Hardy Field; Starkville, MS | W 6–0 | |
| November 9 | at LSU | State Field; Baton Rouge, LA | L 11–23 | |
| November 16 | vs. Tennessee | Driving Park; Memphis, TN | L 4–11 | |
| November 28 | vs. Ole Miss | Mississippi State Fairgrounds; Jackson, MS (rivalry) | W 15–0 | |
*Non-conference game
