= 1907 Alabama Crimson Tide football team =

American college football season

1907 Alabama Crimson Tide football
- Conference: Southern Intercollegiate Athletic Association
- Record: 5–1–2 (3–1–2 SIAA)
- Head coach: J. W. H. Pollard (2nd season)
- Captain: Emile Hannon
- Home stadium: The Quad; Birmingham Fairgrounds; Highland Park; Monroe Park

1907 Southern Intercollegiate Athletic Association football standings
	Conf.					Overall
Team	W		L		T	W		L		T
Vanderbilt $	3	–	0	–	0	5	–	1	–	1
Sewanee	6	–	1	–	0	8	–	1	–	0
LSU	3	–	1	–	0	7	–	3	–	0
Alabama	3	–	1	–	2	5	–	1	–	2
Tennessee	3	–	2	–	0	7	–	2	–	1
Auburn	3	–	2	–	1	6	–	2	–	1
Georgia	3	–	3	–	1	4	–	3	–	1
Mississippi A&M	3	–	3	–	0	6	–	3	–	0
Georgia Tech	2	–	4	–	0	4	–	4	–	0
Clemson	1	–	3	–	0	4	–	4	–	0
Mercer	0	–	3	–	0	3	–	3	–	0
Howard (AL)	0	–	5	–	0	2	–	5	–	0
Ole Miss	0	–	5	–	0	0	–	6	–	0
Nashville			–					–
$ – Conference champion

The 1907 Alabama Crimson Tide football team (variously "Alabama", "UA" or "Bama") represented the University of Alabama in the 1907 Southern Intercollegiate Athletic Association football season. It was the Crimson Tide's 15th overall and 12th season as a member of the Southern Intercollegiate Athletic Association (SIAA). The team was led by head coach J. W. H. Pollard, in his second year, and played their home games at the University of Alabama Quad in Tuscaloosa, the Birmingham Fairgrounds in Birmingham, Highland Park in Montgomery and at Monroe Park in Mobile, Alabama. They finished the season with a record of five wins, one loss and two ties (5–1–2 overall, 3–1–2 in the SIAA).

Alabama played several games of note during the season. Their 54–4 loss to Sewanee is the last time Alabama allowed an opponent to score 50 points in a regulation game until a 52–49 loss to Tennessee on October 15, 2022. (In 2003 Tennessee beat Alabama 51–43 in a game that went five overtimes after being tied 20–20 at the end of regulation.) The victory over LSU at Monroe Park marked the first ever Alabama home game played in Mobile.

== Schedule ==
Date	Opponent	Site	Result	Source
October 5	Maryville (TN)*	The Quad; Tuscaloosa, AL	W 17–0	
October 12	vs. Ole Miss	Columbus Fairgrounds; Columbus, MS (rivalry)	W 20–0	
October 21	Sewanee	The Quad; Tuscaloosa, AL	L 4–54	
October 26	Georgia	Highland Park; Montgomery, AL (rivalry)	T 0–0	
November 2	Centre*	Birmingham Fairgrounds; Birmingham, AL	W 12–0	
November 16	Auburn	Birmingham Fairgrounds; Birmingham, AL (rivalry)	T 6–6	
November 23	LSU	Monroe Park; Mobile, AL (rivalry)	W 6–4	
November 28	Tennessee	Birmingham Fairgrounds; Birmingham, AL (rivalry)	W 5–0	
*Non-conference game

- Scoring note: (Note: For the 1907 season, point values were different from those used in contemporary games. In 1907 a touchdown was worth five points, a field goal was worth four points and a conversion (PAT) was worth one point.)

== 1907 Iron Bowl ==
Alabama's 6–6 tie with Auburn was both the only tie in the history of the Iron Bowl and the last meeting between the two teams for forty years. Auburn was a 3 to 1 favorite going into the game, due to their earlier victory over Georgia and the fact that they had lost to Sewanee by only 6 points while Alabama lost to Sewanee by 50. Alabama missed a chance to win when a 15-yard field goal attempt failed.

Speculation as to why the Alabama–Auburn series was discontinued was originally thought to have been done as a safety precaution due violence both on the field and amongst the fans in the 1907 game. Instead, the game was canceled due to a disagreement between the schools on how much per diem to allow players for the trip to Birmingham, how many players each school should bring and where to find officials, and by the time all these matters were resolved, it was too late to play in 1908. For forty years the two teams failed to play each other, even though they were in the same state and members of the same conferences. Finally, pressure from the state legislature resulted in the renewal of the rivalry in 1948.

This game is also believed to be where the University of Alabama got their team name, the Crimson Tide, where a sports editor by the name of Hugh Roberts said The Team played like a "Crimson Tide" noting the fact that the rain had caused the red soil to turn to mud and stain the white jerseys of the Alabama team.
