= 1907 Mercer Baptists football team =

American college football season

1907 Mercer Baptists football
- Conference: Southern Intercollegiate Athletic Association
- Record: 3–3 (0–3 SIAA)
- Head coach: H. R. Schenker (1st season)
- Home stadium: Central City Park

1907 Southern Intercollegiate Athletic Association football standings
	Conf.					Overall
Team	W		L		T	W		L		T
Vanderbilt $	3	–	0	–	0	5	–	1	–	1
Sewanee	6	–	1	–	0	8	–	1	–	0
LSU	3	–	1	–	0	7	–	3	–	0
Alabama	3	–	1	–	2	5	–	1	–	2
Tennessee	3	–	2	–	0	7	–	2	–	1
Auburn	3	–	2	–	1	6	–	2	–	1
Georgia	3	–	3	–	1	4	–	3	–	1
Mississippi A&M	3	–	3	–	0	6	–	3	–	0
Georgia Tech	2	–	4	–	0	4	–	4	–	0
Clemson	1	–	3	–	0	4	–	4	–	0
Mercer	0	–	3	–	0	3	–	3	–	0
Howard (AL)	0	–	5	–	0	2	–	5	–	0
Ole Miss	0	–	5	–	0	0	–	6	–	0
Nashville			–					–
$ – Conference champion

The 1907 Mercer Baptists football team represented Mercer University as a member of the Southern Intercollegiate Athletic Association (SIAA) during the 1907 college football season. They finished with a record of 3–3 and were outscored by their opponents 28–170.

== Schedule ==
Date	Opponent	Site	Result	Source
October 12	Florida*	Central City Park; Macon, GA	W 6–0	
October 19	Georgia	Central City Park; Macon, GA	L 6–26	
October 25	at Mississippi A&M	Columbus Fairgrounds; Columbus, MS	L 0–75	
November 2	Howard (AL)	Central City Park; Macon, GA	W 11–6	
November 9	at Auburn	Drill Field; Auburn, AL	L 0–63	
November 16	Gordon Institute*	Central City Park; Macon, GA	W 5–0	
*Non-conference game
