= 1907 LSU Tigers football team =

American college football season

1907 LSU Tigers football
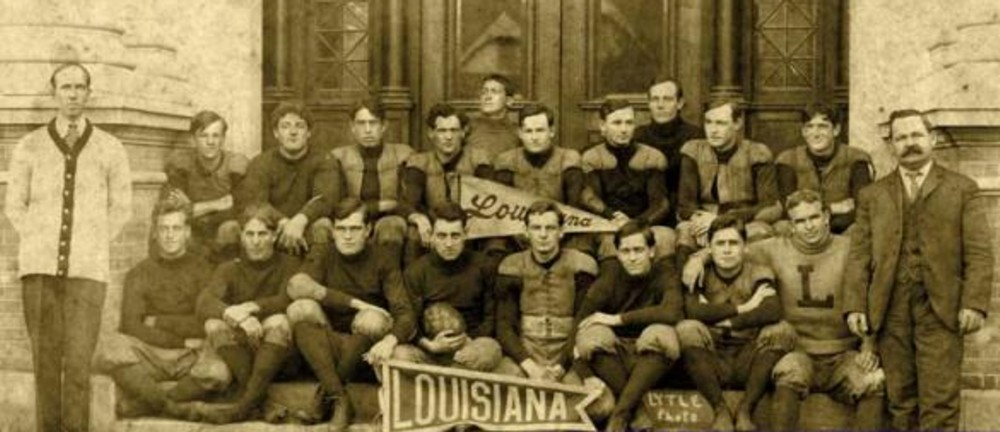

Bacardi Bowl champion

Bacardi Bowl, W 56–0 vs. University of Havana
- Conference: Southern Intercollegiate Athletic Association
- Record: 7–3 (3–1 SIAA)
- Head coach: Edgar Wingard (1st season)
- Captain: Solle W. Brannon
- Home stadium: State Field

1907 Southern Intercollegiate Athletic Association football standings
	Conf.					Overall
Team	W		L		T	W		L		T
Vanderbilt $	3	–	0	–	0	5	–	1	–	1
Sewanee	6	–	1	–	0	8	–	1	–	0
LSU	3	–	1	–	0	7	–	3	–	0
Alabama	3	–	1	–	2	5	–	1	–	2
Tennessee	3	–	2	–	0	7	–	2	–	1
Auburn	3	–	2	–	1	6	–	2	–	1
Georgia	3	–	3	–	1	4	–	3	–	1
Mississippi A&M	3	–	3	–	0	6	–	3	–	0
Georgia Tech	2	–	4	–	0	4	–	4	–	0
Clemson	1	–	3	–	0	4	–	4	–	0
Mercer	0	–	3	–	0	3	–	3	–	0
Howard (AL)	0	–	5	–	0	2	–	5	–	0
Ole Miss	0	–	5	–	0	0	–	6	–	0
Nashville			–					–
$ – Conference champion

The 1907 LSU Tigers football team represented the LSU Tigers of Louisiana State University during the 1907 Southern Intercollegiate Athletic Association football season. The season was the first year under coach Edgar Wingard. It was also the first year at LSU for star player, Doc Fenton.

== Schedule ==
Date	Opponent	Site	Result	Attendance	Source
October 11	Louisiana Industrial*	State Field; Baton Rouge, LA	W 28–0		
October 19	at Texas*	Clark Field; Austin, TX	L 5–12		
October 21	at Texas A&M*	Kyle Field; College Station, TX (rivalry)	L 5–11		
October 28	Howard (AL)*	State Field; Baton Rouge, LA	W 57–0		
November 6	Arkansas*	State Field; Baton Rouge, LA (rivalry)	W 17–12		
November 9	Mississippi A&M	State Field; Baton Rouge, LA (rivalry)	W 23–11		
November 16	at Ole Miss	League Park; Jackson, MS (rivalry)	W 23–0	5,000	
November 23	at Alabama	Monroe Park; Mobile, AL (rivalry)	L 4–6		
December 6	Baylor*	State Field; Baton Rouge, LA	W 48–0		
December 25	at University of Havana*	Almandares Park; Havana, Cuba (Bacardi Bowl)	W 56–0		
*Non-conference game

== Before the season ==
Fenton, who was from Scranton, Pennsylvania, had been heavily recruited by Wingard to play at LSU.

== Game summaries ==
=== Louisiana Industrial ===
The Tigers opened the season at State Field, by beating Louisiana Industrial, 28–0. A highlight of that game was a 90-yard touchdown run by Doc Fenton. It was Louisiana Industrial's only loss on the season.

=== Texas and Texas A&M ===
This win was followed by losses on the road at Texas and Texas A&M. After these losses, LSU went on to win 4 straight games.

=== Howard ===
The Tigers romped over Howard 57–0.

=== Arkansas ===
The 17–12 win over Arkansas was the school's first over the school.

=== Alabama ===
That 4 game winning streak was broken by a loss to Alabama. In the contest against Alabama, LSU led for most of the game because of two safeties. Alabama scored late in the game from an 85-yard punt return to win the game 6–4.

=== Baylor ===
LSU's next game resulted in a win over Baylor.

=== Bacardi Bowl ===
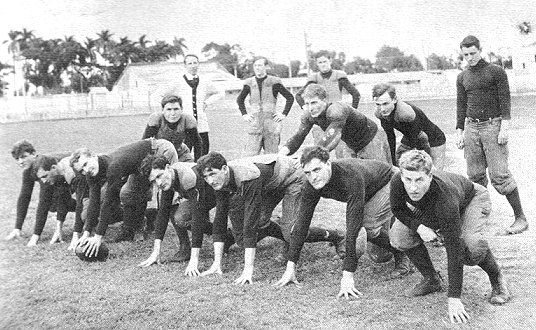
1907 LSU Tigers football team in Havana, Cuba for the 1907 Bacardi Bowl

Their last game of the season was in an appearance at the Bacardi Bowl. This was LSU's first bowl game, and the first time any U.S. football team played in a foreign country.

This game, played in Cuba against the University of Havana resulted in a 56–0 victory for LSU.
