= Arthur G. Erwin =

American football player and coach (c. 1881 – 1931)

Biographical details
- Born: c. 1881
- Died: February 12, 1931 (aged 49) near Johnson City, Tennessee, U.S.

Playing career

Football
- 1905–1906: Yale

Baseball
- c. 1905: Yale
- Positions: Guard (football); Catcher (baseball)

Coaching career (HC unless noted)
- 1907: Sewanee

Head coaching record
- Overall: 8–1

Arthur Garfield Erwin (c. 1881) – February 12, 1931) was an American college football player and coach. He played football at Yale University, lettering in 1905 and 1906. Erwin served as the head football coach at Sewanee: The University of the South in 1907, compiling a record of 8–1.

A native of Clearbranch, Tennessee, Erwin also baseball baseball as a catcher as Yale. In 1900, he graduated from Science Hill High School in Johnson City, Tennessee, and then attended the Hotchkiss School in Lakeville, Connecticut before moving on to Yale. In 1911, Erwin was working for the Bell Telephone Company in Kansas City, Missouri, when was afflicted with typhoid fever. While recuperating, he suffered a stroke, which left him disabled for the rest of his life. Erwin died at the age of 49, on February 12, 1931, near Johnson City.

== Head coaching record ==
Year	Team	Overall	Conference	Standing	Bowl/playoffs
Sewanee Tigers (Southern Intercollegiate Athletic Association) (1907)
1907	Sewanee	8–1	6–1	2nd	
Sewanee:		8–1	6–1		
Total:		8–1			
