= 1907 Clemson Tigers football team =

American college football season

1907 Clemson Tigers football
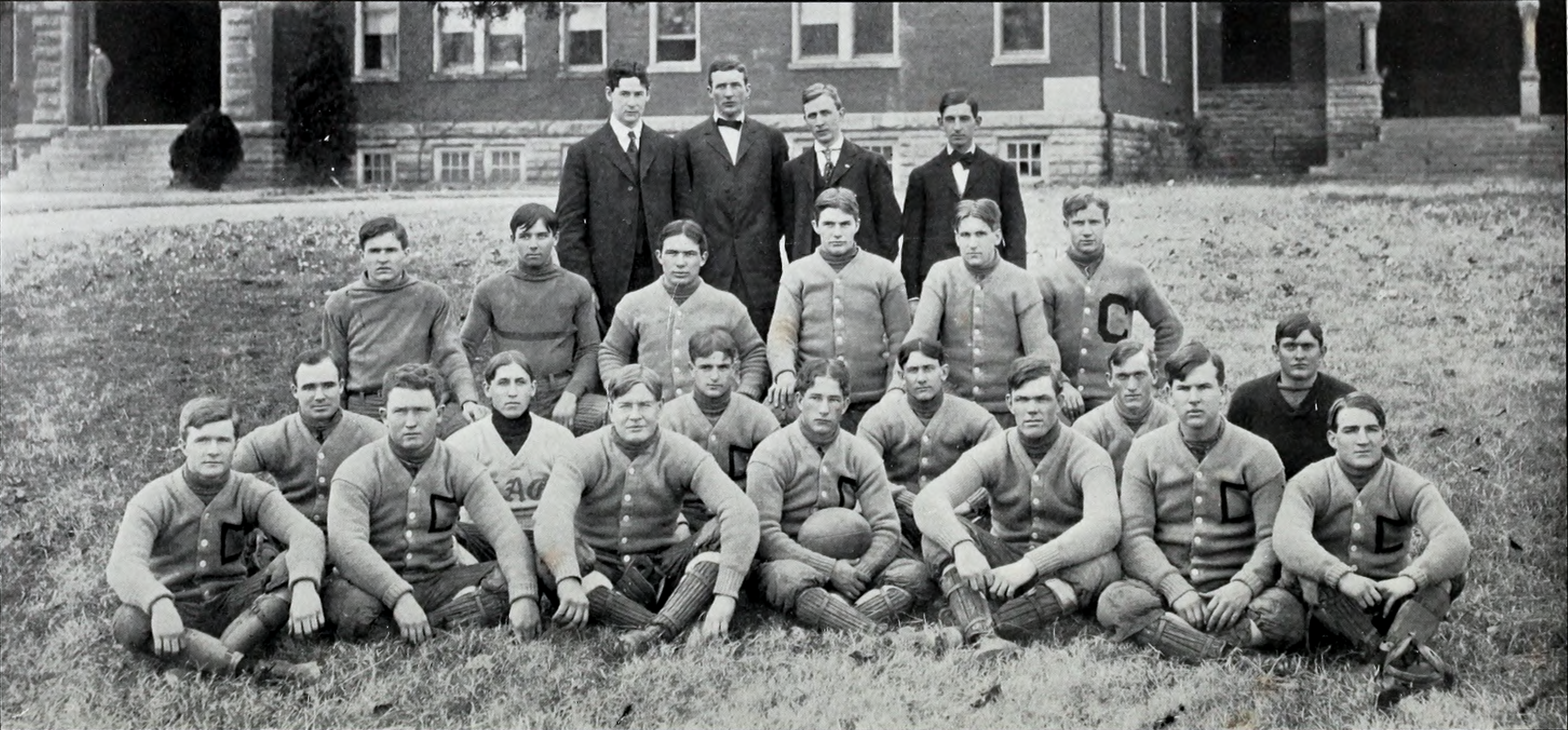
- Conference: Southern Intercollegiate Athletic Association
- Record: 4–4 (1–3 SIAA)
- Head coach: Frank Shaughnessy (1st season)
- Captain: Mac McLaurin
- Home stadium: Bowman Field

1907 Southern Intercollegiate Athletic Association football standings
	Conf.					Overall
Team	W		L		T	W		L		T
Vanderbilt $	3	–	0	–	0	5	–	1	–	1
Sewanee	6	–	1	–	0	8	–	1	–	0
LSU	3	–	1	–	0	7	–	3	–	0
Alabama	3	–	1	–	2	5	–	1	–	2
Tennessee	3	–	2	–	0	7	–	2	–	1
Auburn	3	–	2	–	1	6	–	2	–	1
Georgia	3	–	3	–	1	4	–	3	–	1
Mississippi A&M	3	–	3	–	0	6	–	3	–	0
Georgia Tech	2	–	4	–	0	4	–	4	–	0
Clemson	1	–	3	–	0	4	–	4	–	0
Mercer	0	–	3	–	0	3	–	3	–	0
Howard (AL)	0	–	5	–	0	2	–	5	–	0
Ole Miss	0	–	5	–	0	0	–	6	–	0
Nashville			–					–
$ – Conference champion

The 1907 Clemson Tigers football team represented Clemson Agricultural College—now known as Clemson University—as a member of the Southern Intercollegiate Athletic Association (SIAA) during the 1907 college football season. Led by Frank Shaughnessy in his first and only season as head coach, the team posted an overall record of 4–4 with a mark of 1–3 in SIAA play. Mac McLaurin was the team captain.

== Schedule ==
Date	Time	Opponent	Site	Result	Attendance	Source
September 28		Gordon*	Bowman Field; Calhoun, SC	W 5–0		
October 9		Maryville (TN)*	Bowman Field; Calhoun, SC	W 35–0		
October 21		Tennessee	Bowman Field; Calhoun, SC	L 0–4		
October 31	11:00 a.m.	vs. North Carolina*	Columbia, SC	W 15–6		
November 4		at Auburn	Drill Field; Auburn, AL (rivalry)	L 0–12	1,000	
November 7	3:00 p.m.	vs. Georgia	Georgia-Carolina fair grounds; Augusta, GA (rivalry)	L 0–8	6,000–10,000	
November 9		Davidson*	Bowman Field; Calhoun, SC	L 6–10		
November 28	2:30 p.m.	at Georgia Tech	Ponce de Leon Park; Atlanta, GA (rivalry)	W 6–5		
*Non-conference game; All times are in Eastern time
