= 1907 Ole Miss Rebels football team =

American college football season

1907 Ole Miss Rebels football
- Conference: Southern Intercollegiate Athletic Association
- Record: 0–6 (0–5 SIAA)
- Head coach: Frank A. Mason (1st season)

1907 Southern Intercollegiate Athletic Association football standings
	Conf.					Overall
Team	W		L		T	W		L		T
Vanderbilt $	3	–	0	–	0	5	–	1	–	1
Sewanee	6	–	1	–	0	8	–	1	–	0
LSU	3	–	1	–	0	7	–	3	–	0
Alabama	3	–	1	–	2	5	–	1	–	2
Tennessee	3	–	2	–	0	7	–	2	–	1
Auburn	3	–	2	–	1	6	–	2	–	1
Georgia	3	–	3	–	1	4	–	3	–	1
Mississippi A&M	3	–	3	–	0	6	–	3	–	0
Georgia Tech	2	–	4	–	0	4	–	4	–	0
Clemson	1	–	3	–	0	4	–	4	–	0
Mercer	0	–	3	–	0	3	–	3	–	0
Howard (AL)	0	–	5	–	0	2	–	5	–	0
Ole Miss	0	–	5	–	0	0	–	6	–	0
Nashville			–					–
$ – Conference champion

The 1907 Ole Miss Rebels football team represented the University of Mississippi during the 1907 Southern Intercollegiate Athletic Association football season. In what would be Mason's final game as head coach, Ole Miss faced rival Mississippi A&M on a cold, wet Thanksgiving Day. Before the second half began, Mason brought out an urn filled with whisky-laced coffee in an attempt to warm his players. Sloppy second-half play resulted in a 15 to 0 Ole Miss loss. After the game, many of the players blamed Mason for the loss and when asked if the team was returning home that night, Mason was quoted as saying "Yes, the team is going north at 11 o'clock. I'm going in another direction, and hope I never see them again!"

== Schedule ==
Date	Opponent	Site	Result	Attendance	Source
October 12	vs. Alabama	Columbus Fairgrounds; Columbus, MS (rivalry)	L 0–20		
October 19	Cape Girardeau Normal*	Oxford, MS	L 6–12		
October 26	vs. Sewanee	Varsity Field; Memphis, TN	L 0–65		
November 9	at Vanderbilt	Dudley Field; Nashville, TN (rivalry)	L 0–60		
November 16	LSU	League Park; Jackson, MS (rivalry)	L 0–23	5,000	
November 28	vs. Mississippi A&M	League Park; Jackson, MS (rivalry)	L 0–15		
*Non-conference game
