= Daniel Blake =

Daniel Blake may refer to:

- Dan Blake (1882–1953), American football player
- I, Daniel Blake, a 2016 drama film by Ken Loach
