= 1907 Georgia Bulldogs football team =

American college football season

1907 Georgia Bulldogs football
- Conference: Southern Intercollegiate Athletic Association
- Record: 4–3–1 (3–3–1 SIAA)
- Head coach: George S. Whitney (2nd season)
- Captain: Kyle Smith
- Home stadium: Herty Field

1907 Southern Intercollegiate Athletic Association football standings
	Conf.					Overall
Team	W		L		T	W		L		T
Vanderbilt $	3	–	0	–	0	5	–	1	–	1
Sewanee	6	–	1	–	0	8	–	1	–	0
LSU	3	–	1	–	0	7	–	3	–	0
Alabama	3	–	1	–	2	5	–	1	–	2
Tennessee	3	–	2	–	0	7	–	2	–	1
Auburn	3	–	2	–	1	6	–	2	–	1
Georgia	3	–	3	–	1	4	–	3	–	1
Mississippi A&M	3	–	3	–	0	6	–	3	–	0
Georgia Tech	2	–	4	–	0	4	–	4	–	0
Clemson	1	–	3	–	0	4	–	4	–	0
Mercer	0	–	3	–	0	3	–	3	–	0
Howard (AL)	0	–	5	–	0	2	–	5	–	0
Ole Miss	0	–	5	–	0	0	–	6	–	0
Nashville			–					–
$ – Conference champion

The 1907 Georgia Bulldogs football team represented the University of Georgia during the 1907 college football season. The Bulldogs compiled a 4–3–1 record, including victories over Mercer, Auburn and Clemson. The victory over Clemson ended a seven-game losing streak to the Tigers. However, the season included Georgia's fourth straight loss to Georgia Tech. One of the players on the 1907 team was quarterback George "Kid" Woodruff, who became Georgia's head football coach in 1923.

The team started the season under the guidance of head coach George S. Whitney, but the season became marred by the "Ringer" controversy. At that time, there were no football scholarships, but enthusiastic alumni often raised money to pay professional players who were referred to as "ringers." After the 1907 game with Georgia Tech, it was revealed that there were at least four ringers on the Georgia and Georgia Tech teams. Thereafter, Georgia completed the season without its ringers and without Bull Whitney, who was forced to resign. Branch Bocock actually coached the last three games of the 1907 season.

== Schedule ==
Date	Opponent	Site	Result	Attendance	Source
October 5	North Georgia*	Herty Field; Athens, GA	W 57–0		
October 12	Tennessee	Herty Field; Athens, GA (rivalry)	L 0–15		
October 19	at Mercer	Central City Park; Macon, GA	W 26–6		
October 25	at Alabama	Highland Park; Montgomery, AL (rivalry)	T 0–0		
November 2	at Georgia Tech	Ponce de Leon Park; Atlanta, GA (rivalry)	L 6–10		
November 7	vs. Clemson	Georgia-Carolina fair grounds; Augusta, GA (rivalry)	W 8–0	6,000–10,000	
November 11	Sewanee	Herty Field; Athens, GA	L 0–16		
November 28	vs. Auburn	Central City Park; Macon, GA (rivalry)	W 6–0		
*Non-conference game
