= 1907 Auburn Tigers football team =

American college football season

1907 Auburn Tigers football
- Conference: Southern Intercollegiate Athletic Association
- Record: 6–2–1 (3–2–1 SIAA)
- Head coach: Willis Kienholz (1st season)
- Captain: D. E. Wilkinson
- Home stadium: Drill Field; West End Park

1907 Southern Intercollegiate Athletic Association football standings
	Conf.					Overall
Team	W		L		T	W		L		T
Vanderbilt $	3	–	0	–	0	5	–	1	–	1
Sewanee	6	–	1	–	0	8	–	1	–	0
LSU	3	–	1	–	0	7	–	3	–	0
Alabama	3	–	1	–	2	5	–	1	–	2
Tennessee	3	–	2	–	0	7	–	2	–	1
Auburn	3	–	2	–	1	6	–	2	–	1
Georgia	3	–	3	–	1	4	–	3	–	1
Mississippi A&M	3	–	3	–	0	6	–	3	–	0
Georgia Tech	2	–	4	–	0	4	–	4	–	0
Clemson	1	–	3	–	0	4	–	4	–	0
Mercer	0	–	3	–	0	3	–	3	–	0
Howard (AL)	0	–	5	–	0	2	–	5	–	0
Ole Miss	0	–	5	–	0	0	–	6	–	0
Nashville			–					–
$ – Conference champion

The 1907 Auburn Tigers football team represented Alabama Polytechnic Institute (now known Auburn University) in the 1907 Southern Intercollegiate Athletic Association football season. Coached by Willis Kienholz, Auburn recorded a 6–2–1 record in its 16th season of intercollegiate football. The Tigers averaged 26.4 points per game on offense and gave up only 4.3 points per game.

1907 was the last season before a 40-year hiatus in the Iron Bowl series between Auburn and Alabama. The two teams did not meet on the gridiron from 1908 to 1947.

== Schedule ==
Date	Opponent	Site	Result	Attendance	Source
October 5	Howard (AL)*	Drill Field; Auburn, AL	W 23–0		
October 7	Maryville (TN)*	Drill Field; Auburn, AL	W 23–0		
October 12	Gordon College*	Drill Field; Auburn, AL	W 34–0		
October 19	Sewanee	West End Park; Birmingham, AL	L 6–12		
October 26	at Georgia Tech	Ponce de Leon Park; Atlanta, GA (rivalry)	W 12–6		
November 4	Clemson	Drill Field; Auburn, AL (rivalry)	W 12–0	1,000	
November 9	Mercer	Drill Field; Auburn, AL	W 63–0		
November 16	vs. Alabama	Birmingham Fairgrounds; Birmingham, AL (Iron Bowl)	T 6–6		
November 28	vs. Georgia	Central City Park; Macon, GA (rivalry)	L 0–6		
*Non-conference game
