= Walter Barrett =

American football player (1885–1931)

Profile
- Positions: Quarterback, running back

Personal information
- Born: January 9, 1885; Covington, Tennessee, U.S.
- Died: June 11, 1931 (aged 46); San Antonio, Texas, U.S.
- Listed height: 5 ft 10 in (1.78 m)
- Listed weight: 155 lb (70 kg)

Career information
- High school: Mooney School
- College: Sewanee (1905–1907)

Awards and highlights
- All-Southern (1907)

Walter Stanley Barrett (January 9, 1885 – June 11, 1931) was an American college football player.

== Sewanee ==
Barrett was a prominent running back for the Sewanee Tigers football team of Sewanee: The University of the South from 1905 to 1907.

He was captain and quarterback in 1907, for one of Sewanee's greatest teams. Barrett was selected All-Southern. He was selected to be Sewanee's delegate to the SIAA convention. After the convention he was in the lumber business in Memphis.
