= 1907 Georgia Tech Yellow Jackets football team =

American college football season

1907 Georgia Tech Yellow Jackets football
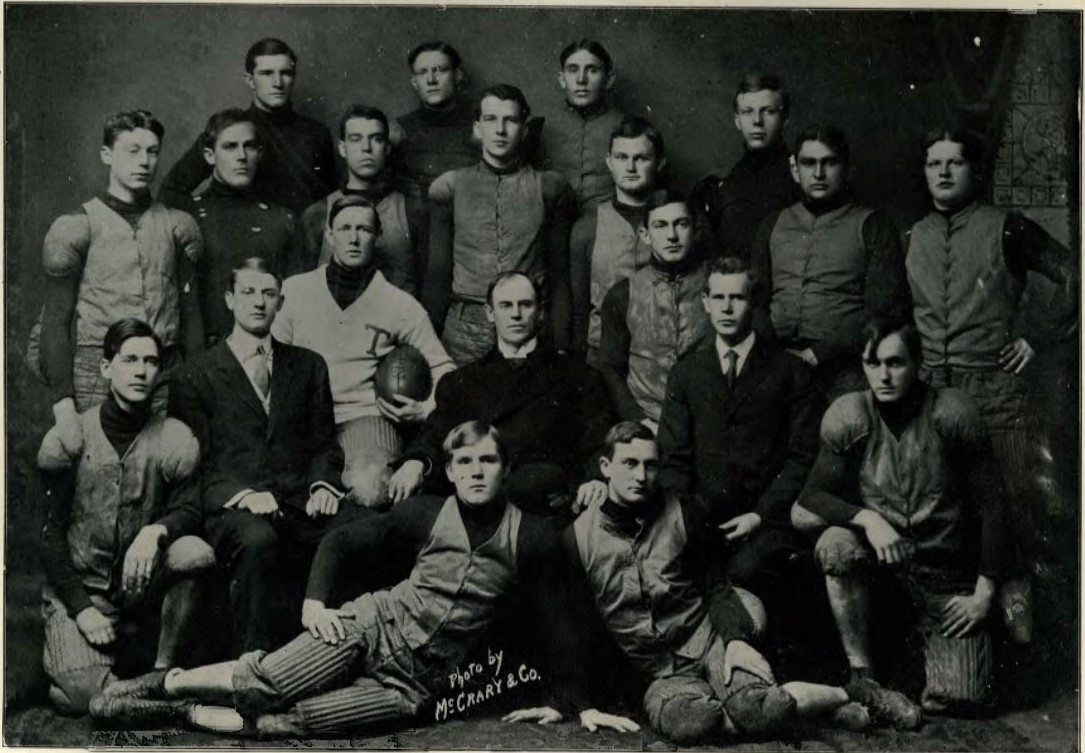
- Conference: Southern Intercollegiate Athletic Association
- Record: 4–4 (2–4 SIAA)
- Head coach: John Heisman (4th season)
- Captain: C. A. Sweet
- Home stadium: The Flats, Ponce de Leon Park

1907 Southern Intercollegiate Athletic Association football standings
	Conf.					Overall
Team	W		L		T	W		L		T
Vanderbilt $	3	–	0	–	0	5	–	1	–	1
Sewanee	6	–	1	–	0	8	–	1	–	0
LSU	3	–	1	–	0	7	–	3	–	0
Alabama	3	–	1	–	2	5	–	1	–	2
Tennessee	3	–	2	–	0	7	–	2	–	1
Auburn	3	–	2	–	1	6	–	2	–	1
Georgia	3	–	3	–	1	4	–	3	–	1
Mississippi A&M	3	–	3	–	0	6	–	3	–	0
Georgia Tech	2	–	4	–	0	4	–	4	–	0
Clemson	1	–	3	–	0	4	–	4	–	0
Mercer	0	–	3	–	0	3	–	3	–	0
Howard (AL)	0	–	5	–	0	2	–	5	–	0
Ole Miss	0	–	5	–	0	0	–	6	–	0
Nashville			–					–
$ – Conference champion

The 1907 Georgia Tech Yellow Jackets football team represented the Georgia Institute of Technology during the 1907 college football season.

== Schedule ==
Date	Time	Opponent	Site	Result	Source
October 5		Gordon*	The Flats; Atlanta, GA	W 51–0	
October 12		North Georgia*	The Flats; Atlanta, GA	W 70–0	
October 19		Tennessee	Ponce de Leon Park; Atlanta, GA (rivalry)	W 6–4	
October 26		Auburn	Ponce de Leon Park; Atlanta, GA (rivalry)	L 6–12	
November 2		Georgia	Ponce de Leon Park; Atlanta, GA (rivalry)	W 10–6	
November 9		Sewanee	Ponce de Leon Park; Atlanta, GA	L 6–37	
November 16		at Vanderbilt	Dudley Field; Nashville, TN (rivalry)	L 0–54	
November 28	2:30 p.m.	Clemson	Ponce de Leon Park; Atlanta, GA (rivalry)	L 5–6	
*Non-conference game
