= 1907 Tennessee Volunteers football team =

American college football season

1907 Tennessee Volunteers football
- Conference: Southern Intercollegiate Athletic Association
- Record: 7–2–1 (3–2 SIAA)
- Head coach: George Levene (1st season)
- Captain: Roscoe Word
- Home stadium: Chilhowee Park

1907 Southern Intercollegiate Athletic Association football standings
	Conf.					Overall
Team	W		L		T	W		L		T
Vanderbilt $	3	–	0	–	0	5	–	1	–	1
Sewanee	6	–	1	–	0	8	–	1	–	0
LSU	3	–	1	–	0	7	–	3	–	0
Alabama	3	–	1	–	2	5	–	1	–	2
Tennessee	3	–	2	–	0	7	–	2	–	1
Auburn	3	–	2	–	1	6	–	2	–	1
Georgia	3	–	3	–	1	4	–	3	–	1
Mississippi A&M	3	–	3	–	0	6	–	3	–	0
Georgia Tech	2	–	4	–	0	4	–	4	–	0
Clemson	1	–	3	–	0	4	–	4	–	0
Mercer	0	–	3	–	0	3	–	3	–	0
Howard (AL)	0	–	5	–	0	2	–	5	–	0
Ole Miss	0	–	5	–	0	0	–	6	–	0
Nashville			–					–
$ – Conference champion

The 1907 Tennessee Volunteers football team represented the University of Tennessee in the 1907 Southern Intercollegiate Athletic Association football season. Led by new head coach George Levene, the Volunteers had their first seven-win season in team history.

== Schedule ==
Date	Opponent	Site	Result	Source
October 5	Tennessee Military Institute*	Chilhowee Park; Knoxville, TN	W 30–0	
October 12	at Georgia	Herty Field; Athens, GA (rivalry)	W 15–0	
October 19	at Georgia Tech	Ponce de Leon Park; Atlanta, GA (rivalry)	L 4–6	
October 21	at Clemson	Bowman Field; Clemson, SC	W 4–0	
October 26	Maryville (TN)*	Chilhowee Park; Knoxville, TN	W 34–0	
November 2	Chattanooga*	Chilhowee Park; Knoxville, TN	W 57–0	
November 9	Kentucky State College*	Chilhowee Park; Knoxville, TN (rivalry)	T 0–0	
November 16	vs. Mississippi A&M	Driving Park; Memphis, TN	W 11–4	
November 18	at Arkansas*	West End Park; Little Rock, AR	W 14–2	
November 28	at Alabama	Birmingham Fairgrounds; Birmingham, AL (rivalry)	L 0–5	
*Non-conference game
