= George Levene =

American football player and coach (1885–1930)

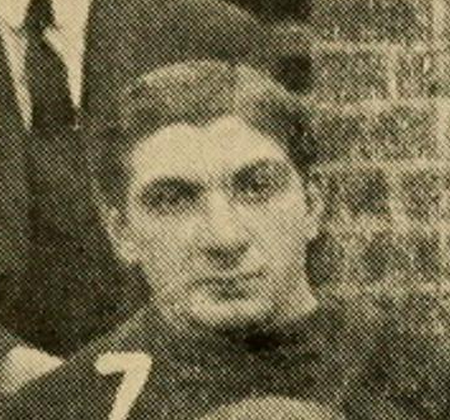
- Levene pictured on the 1906 Penn football team

Biographical details
- Born: May 1, 1885
- Died: November 12, 1930 (aged 45)

Playing career
- 1905–1906: Penn
- Position: End

Coaching career (HC unless noted)
- 1907–1909: Tennessee
- 1920: Penn (ends)
- 1922: Wake Forest

Head coaching record
- Overall: 18–15–5

Accomplishments and honors

Awards
- Second-team All-American (1906); Third-team All-American (1905)

Israel George "Izzy" Levene (May 1, 1885 – November 12, 1930) was an American college football player and coach. He served as the head football coach at the University of Tennessee from 1907 to 1909 and at Wake Forest University in 1922, compiling a career record of 18–15–5.

== Playing career ==
Levene played college football at the University of Pennsylvania, and was named an All-American in 1905 and 1906. In 1905, Penn went 12–0–1. Levene was known for being a football player who worked hard to help out his team, as well as one of the first good pass catching ends. The forward pass was legalized for the 1906 season.

== Assistant coaching career ==
Levene coached under head coach John Heisman at the University of Pennsylvania.

== Head coaching career ==
During his three-year tenure at Tennessee, Levene compiled a 15–10–3 record. His best season came in 1907, when his team went 7–2–1. His worst season came in 1909, when his team went 1–6–2, with the one win coming against Transylvania University. In 1922, Levene served as the head coach at Wake Forest. He compiled a 3–5–2 record there.

== Later life ==
After coaching, Levene was a football official and wrote a book, Twenty Modern Football Plays.

== Head coaching record ==
Year	Team	Overall	Conference	Standing	Bowl/playoffs
Tennessee Volunteers (Southern Intercollegiate Athletic Association) (1907–1909)
1907	Tennessee	7–2–1	3–2–1	T–5th	
1908	Tennessee	7–2	4–2	5th	
1909	Tennessee	1–6–2	0–5	13th	
Tennessee:		15–10–3	7–9–1		
Wake Forest Baptists (Independent) (1922)
1922	Wake Forest	3–5–2			
Wake Forest:		3–5–2			
Total:		18–15–5			
