= Fred Furman =

American football player and coach (1881–1938)

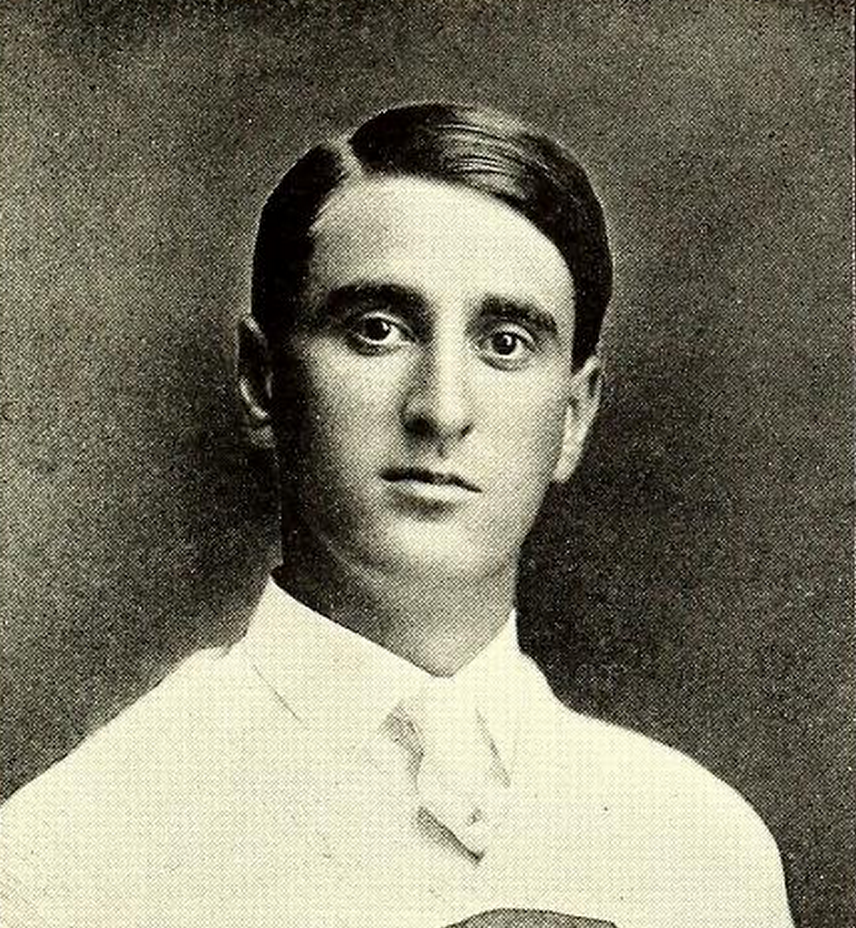
- Furman pictured in Reveille 1908, Mississippi State yearbook

Biographical details
- Born: October 1881; Pennsylvania, U.S.
- Died: December 30, 1938 (aged 57); Los Angeles, California, U.S.

Playing career
- 1904–1905: Cornell

Coaching career (HC unless noted)
- 1907–1908: Mississippi A&M
- 1909–1910: Montana Mines

Administrative career (AD unless noted)
- 1907–1908: Mississippi A&M
- 1910–1911: Montana Mines

Fred John "Steve" Furman (October 1881 – December 30, 1938) was an American college football player and coach, athletics administrator, and lawyer. He served as the head football coach at Mississippi Agricultural & Mechanical Collegenow known as Mississippi State University—from 1907 to 1908, compiling a record of 9–7.

Furman attended Cornell University, where he lettered for the Big Red in 1904 and 1905 under head coach Pop Warner. Furman's brother, Harry "Little" Furman, played for Mississippi A&M in 1907 and 1908, and was the captain of the 1908 team. Harry is tied with Anthony Dixon for third on the single-season rushing touchdown list at Mississippi State, having scored 14 in 1907.

Furman was the head football coach at the Montana School of Mines—now known as Montana Technological University—in Butte, Montana from 1909 to 1910. He was also appointed athletic director at Montana Mines in 1910. He later coached football at Butte High School. Furman practiced law in Butte and represented politician and entrepreneur William A. Clark. He moved to Los Angeles in the late 1920s and continued to represent Clark's son and grandson. Furman fatally shot himself on December 30, 1938, at the office of an attorney friend in Downtown Los Angeles.

== Head coaching record ==
=== College ===
Year	Team	Overall	Conference	Standing	Bowl/playoffs
Mississippi A&M Aggies (Southern Intercollegiate Athletic Association) (1907–1908)
1907	Mississippi A&M	6–3	2–3		
1908	Mississippi A&M	3–4	1–3		
Mississippi A&M:		9–7	3–6		
Montana Mines Orediggers (Independent) (1909–1910)
1909	Montana Mines				
1910	Montana Mines				
Montana Mines:					
Total:					
