= Vaughn Blake =

American football player and FBI agent (1888–1964)

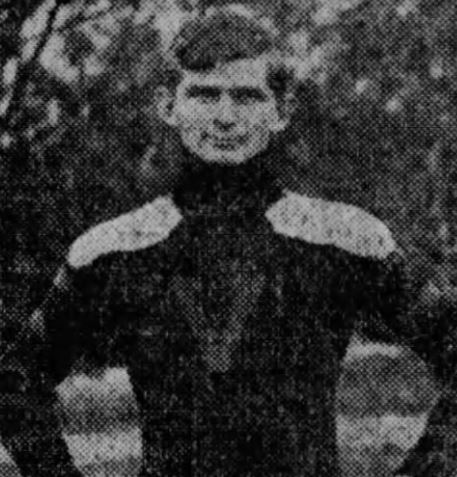

Biographical details
- Born: January 12, 1887; Cuero, Texas, U.S.
- Died: June 29, 1964 (aged 77); Nashville, Tennessee, U.S.

Playing career
- 1905–1908: Vanderbilt
- Position: End

Coaching career (HC unless noted)
- 1910: Birmingham
- 1911: Trenton HS (TN)
- c. 1913: Bowen School (TN)

Administrative career (AD unless noted)
- 1910–1911: Birmingham

Head coaching record
- Overall: 3–3–1 (college)

Accomplishments and honors

Awards
- All-Southern (1908)

John Vaughn Blake (January 12, 1887 – June 29, 1964; often misspelled as Vaughan) was an American college football player, coach, and Federal Bureau of Investigation (FBI) agent.

== Biography ==
Blake was born in 1888 in Cuero, Texas to Daniel Bigelow Blake Sr. and Mary Clara Weldon. Dan Sr. was a physician and once president of the Nashville Academy of Medicine.

Blake played football for Dan McGugin's Vanderbilt Commodores football teams with his brothers Dan and Bob. Dan, Bob, and Vaughn were captains of the 1906, 1907, and 1908 teams respectively. Blake was an end on the football team, selected All-Southern in 1908.

Blake was the head football coach at Birmingham College in 1910. From 1911 to around 1913, he was the head football coach for Trenton High School and the Bowen School. After his coaching career, he spent time refereeing football games in Tennessee.

Blake was later a Federal Bureau of Investigation (FBI) agent assigned to FBI offices in Nashville, Tennessee, Baton Rouge, Louisiana, and New Orleans. In 1935, he had a role in the search for the FBI's "Public Enemy #1", Alvin Karpis.

Blake committed suicide by carbon monoxide poisoning on June 29, 1964.

== Head coaching record ==
=== College ===
Year	Team	Overall	Conference	Standing	Bowl/playoffs
Birmingham (Independent) (1910)
1910	Birmingham	3–3–1			
Birmingham:		3–3–1			
Total:		3–3–1			
