= Frank Faulkinberry =

American athlete and coach (1887–1933)

Biographical details
- Born: November 27, 1887; Fayetteville, Tennessee, U.S.
- Died: May 13, 1933 (aged 45); Tennessee, U.S.

Playing career

Football
- 1907–1910: Sewanee

Baseball
- 1911: Cleveland Counts
- 1912: Evansville Yankees
- 1913: Evansville River Rats
- Positions: Tackle (football); Catcher (baseball)

Coaching career (HC unless noted)

Football
- 1926–1932: Middle Tennessee

Basketball
- 1926–1933: Middle Tennessee

Baseball
- 1927–1932: Middle Tennessee

Administrative career (AD unless noted)
- 1926–1933: Middle Tennessee

Head coaching record
- Overall: 33–26–4 (college football); 45–38 (college basketball)

Accomplishments and honors

Championships
- AAU Women's Basketball (1929)

Awards
- 4× All-Southern (1907, 1908, 1909, 1910); Sewanee Athletics Hall of Fame

Frank Albert Faulkinberry (November 27, 1887 – May 13, 1933) was an American football, basketball, and baseball player and coach. He was the father of football coach Russ Faulkinberry.

== Early years ==
Faulkinberry was born on November 27, 1887, in Lincoln County, Tennessee, to Christopher Columbus Faulkinberry and Sarah Ellen Caple.

== College athletics ==
Faulkinberry was a tackle on the Sewanee Tigers, thrice selected All-Southern. His play was once called "a thing to marvel at." He is a tackle on Sewanee's all-time second team. He was nominated though not selected for an Associated Press All-Time Southeast 1869-1919 era team. As a player, he stood some 6'4", 198 pounds. At Sewanee he was a member of Phi Delta Theta. Faulkinberry is a member of both the Sewanee Athletics Hall of Fame and the Blue Raiders Hall of Fame, having coached for years the Middle Tennessee Blue Raiders in both men and women's sports. He was also a Latin professor. Faulkinberry Drive on the Middle Tennessee State campus is named in his honor. Faulkinberry was inducted into the Sewanee Athletics Hall of Fame in 2014.

== Professional baseball ==
For a few years he was a catcher in Minor League Baseball.

== Coaching career ==
Faulkinberry began his coaching career at Morgan School, Butler School, and Brandon Training School before moving to Franklin Country High School in Decherd, Tennessee, where he coached football and baseball. In May 1926, he was hired as the athletic director and head coach at Middle Tennessee State Teachers College—now known as Middle Tennessee State University—in Murfreesboro, Tennessee.

== Death ==
Faulkinberry was found shot to death in the garage of his home on May 13, 1933. It was a suspected suicide.

== Head coaching record ==
=== College football ===
Year	Team	Overall	Conference	Standing	Bowl/playoffs
Middle Tennessee State Teachers (Independent) (1926–1931)
1926	Middle Tennessee State Teachers	4–2–1			
1927	Middle Tennessee State Teachers	6–2			
1928	Middle Tennessee State Teachers	2–4–1			
1929	Middle Tennessee State Teachers	6–3–1			
1930	Middle Tennessee State Teachers	5–5–1			
1931	Middle Tennessee State Teachers	6–4			
Middle Tennessee State Teachers (Southern Intercollegiate Athletic Association) (1932)
1932	Middle Tennessee State Teachers	4–6	2–3	18th	
Middle Tennessee State Teachers:		33–26–4	2–3		
Total:		33–26–4			
