= Aubrey Lanier =

American football player (1888–1936)

Sewanee Tigers
- Position: Halfback
- Class: 1911

Personal information
- Born: February 18, 1888; Butler, Arkansas, U.S.
- Died: April 25, 1936 (aged 48); Shreveport, Louisiana, U.S.
- Listed height: 5 ft 10 in (1.78 m)
- Listed weight: 170 lb (77 kg)

Career information
- College: Sewanee (1907–1910)

Awards and highlights
- SIAA championship (1909); All-Southern (1907, 1909, 1910); Sewanee All-Time Football Team

Aubrey Falls "Laney" Lanier (February 18, 1888 – April 25, 1936) was an American college football player.

== Early life ==
Lanier was born on February 18, 1888, in the city of Butler in Lonoke County, Arkansas, to Isaac Hill Lanier and Mary "Ellen" Cooper.

== Sewanee ==
Lanier was a halfback for the Sewanee Tigers of Sewanee: The University of the South from 1907 to 1910, thrice selected All-Southern. Vanderbilt head coach Dan McGugin rated him as one of the greatest he ever saw. Grantland Rice rated him amongst the best ever at punt returns. He would catch punts whilst running at full speed. An all-time Sewanee team noted "Critics declare Aubrey Lanier the equal of Walter Eckersall as a safety man." In 1915, John Heisman selected the 30 greatest Southern football players, and mentioned Lanier 21st.

=== 1907 ===
McGugin said of Lanier in 1907 that he was "a star of purest ray, and came near winning the Vanderbilt game by his brilliant dashes after receiving punts."

=== 1909 ===
In 1909 when Sewanee won an SIAA championship Rice called him "the noblest Tiger of them all." The Kappa Alpha Journal gives similar praise that year, calling Lanier "The greatest performer of the college game on the Southern field.

=== 1910 ===
Lanier was captain of the 1910 Sewanee team.
