= Stein Stone =

American athlete and coach (1882–1926)

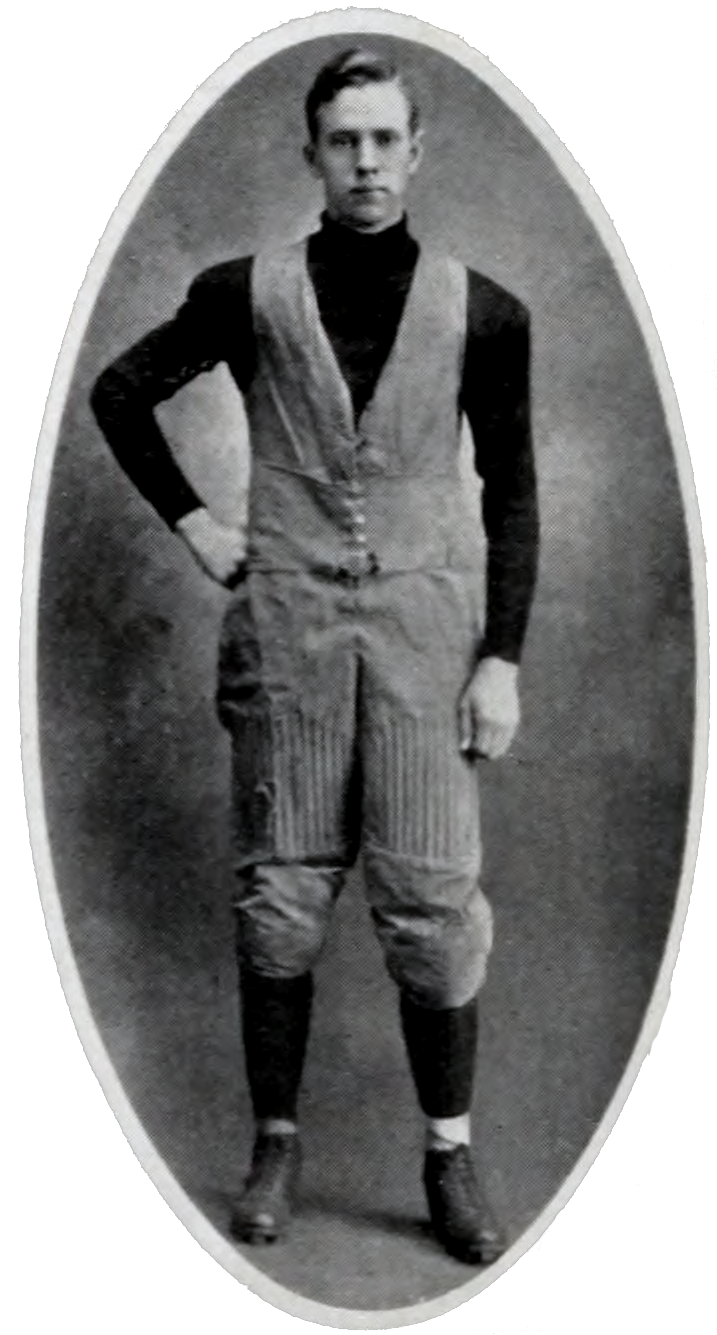

Biographical details
- Born: April 18, 1882; Tennessee, U.S.
- Died: August 25, 1926 (aged 44); Nashville, Tennessee, U.S.
- Education: Vanderbilt University (1908)

Playing career

Football
- 1904–1907: Vanderbilt
- Position: Center

Coaching career (HC unless noted)

Football
- 1908: Clemson

Basketball
- 1906–1907: Vanderbilt

Head coaching record
- Overall: 1–6 (football); 7–6–1 (basketball)

Accomplishments and honors

Awards
- Football: 4x All-Southern (1904–1907); AP Southeast All-Time team 1869–1919 era 1912 All-time Vandy 1st team 1934 All-time Vandy team

James Nollner "Stein" Stone Sr. (April 18, 1882 – August 25, 1926) was an American college football and college basketball player and coach. "Stein" is the German for stone.

== Vanderbilt University ==
At Vanderbilt he was a member of the Delta Tau Delta fraternity.

=== Football ===
He was a four time All-Southern center for Dan McGugin's Vanderbilt football teams, selected for the position on all-time Vanderbilt teams in 1912 and 1934. He was also selected for an Associated Press Southeast Area All-Time football team 1869–1919 era. On another all-time team of Southerners, one finds "For center we shove in Stein Stone of Vanderbilt, who is about as good as man as the South ever saw. Vanderbilt will have about eight of these eleven men." In 1915, John Heisman selected his 30 best Southern football players, and Stone was mentioned 17th. He was some 6 foot 3 and 180 pounds.

==== 1907 ====
In the 1907 game against Michigan, "In the duel of centers, Stone of Vanderbilt, had the best of "Germany" Schulz. Michigan's massive center. Stone's play was spectacular all the way." His catch on a double-pass play then thrown near the end zone by Bob Blake to set up the touchdown run in by Honus Craig that beat Sewanee, for the SIAA championship in 1907, was cited by Grantland Rice as the greatest thrill he ever witnessed in his years of watching sports. Rice selected Michigan's Germany Schulz as football's greatest ever center. "Stone of Vanderbilt wasn't far away," he remarked.

=== Basketball ===
On top of this, Stein was supposedly "the finest basketball player in Dixie."

== Coaching career ==
He served as the head coach of the Clemson college football program in 1908. The Tigers won just a single game, though captain Stick Coles was selected second-team All-Southern. Stein later worked as an engineer in Bristol, Tennessee, where he and his wife, the former Camille Evans, whom he married in 1911, lived.

He died in 1926 in Nashville of lung and oral cancer. He is buried at Mount Olivet Cemetery in Nashville.

== Head coaching record ==
=== Football ===
Year	Team	Overall	Conference	Standing	Bowl/playoffs
Clemson Tigers (Southern Intercollegiate Athletic Association) (1908)
1908	Clemson	1–6	1–4	11th	
Clemson:		1–6	1–4		
Total:		1–6			

=== Basketball ===
Record table
Season	Team	Overall	Conference	Standing	Postseason
Vanderbilt Commodores (Southern Intercollegiate Athletic Association) (1905–1908)
1906–07	Vanderbilt	7–6–1			
Vanderbilt:		7–6–1			
Total:		7–6–1			
