= Bob Blake (American football) =

American athlete (1885–1962)

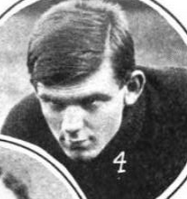
- Blake, c. 1903

Profile
- Position: End

Personal information
- Born: January 31, 1885; Cuero, Texas, U.S.
- Died: May 8, 1962 (aged 77); Webster Groves, Missouri, U.S.
- Listed height: 6 ft 0 in (1.83 m)
- Listed weight: 170 lb (77 kg)

Career information
- High school: Bowen School
- College: Vanderbilt (1903, 1905–1907)

Awards and highlights
- SIAA championship (1903, 1905, 1906, 1907); All-Southern (1903, 1905, 1906, 1907); All-American (1907); 1912 All-time Vandy 1st team; AP Southeast All-Time team (1869-1919 era)

Robert Blake (January 31, 1885 – May 8, 1962) was an American football, basketball, and baseball player for the Vanderbilt Commodores of Vanderbilt University. Every football season in which he played, Blake was a member of the Southern Intercollegiate Athletic Association (SIAA) championship team and unanimously selected All-Southern. He was a lawyer and Rhodes Scholar.

His three brothers, Dan, Vaughn, and Frank, also played on those winning teams. Dan, Bob, and Vaughn were captains of the 1906, 1907, and 1908 Vanderbilt football teams respectively. He thus signed letters "Bob Blake, pater familias."

Blake was later general counsel for the International Shoe Company, and married Dorothy Gaynor. Blake was also president of the Missouri Constitutional Convention in 1944.

== Early life ==
Blake was born on January 31, 1885, in Cuero, Texas, to Daniel Bigelow Blake Sr. and Mary Clara Weldon. Dan Sr. was a physician and once president of the Nashville Academy of Medicine. Bob Blake prepped at Bowen School.

== College career ==
Blake was Vanderbilt University’s first athlete to earn 16 letters, participating in football, basketball, baseball, and track. He stood 6 feet and weighed 170 pounds. While a senior, Blake was honored as Bachelor of Ugliness.

=== Football ===
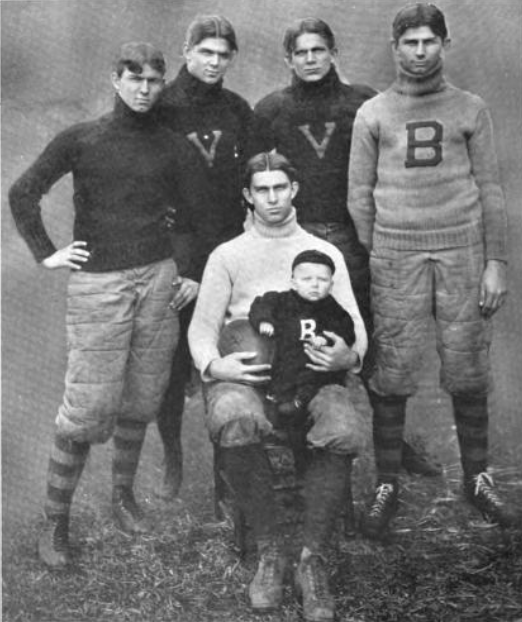
The Blake brothers of Vanderbilt. Bob is second from left.

Blake was a prominent end for Dan McGugin's Vanderbilt Commodores football teams in 1903 and from 1905 to 1907. He was also a punter and drop kicker. As a punter, one writer claimed others considered him "the best in the country." He was selected All-Southern unanimously each and every year he played, and Vanderbilt won the Southern Intercollegiate Athletic Association (SIAA) championship in all of his years. In 1915, John Heisman called Blake one of the greatest players in Vanderbilt history, along with Ray Morrison and Owsley Manier. Grantland Rice once said about Bob Blake, “he was the only halfback who never lost a yard around right end.”

A fellow student at Vanderbilt once said of Blake "He is an athlete and this has been one great factor in making him popular, but Bob Blake would have been a popular man if he had not been an athlete. In the third place he is interested in and takes an active part in every phase of college life. In the fourth place he has maintained himself well in scholarship, while not a brilliant student, he has, in my opinion, made a record above that of the average student." In the opinion of fellow Vanderbilt player Honus Craig, Blake was the South's greatest player. Blake was chosen for an all-time Vandy team in 1912, and for an Associated Press Southeast Area All-Time football team 1869–1919 era.

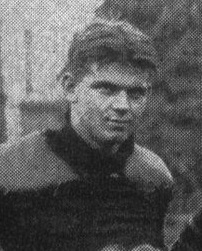
Blake cropped from 1903 team picture.

==== 1903 ====
Both Blake and teammate John J. Tigert were Rhodes Scholars. Blake broke his wrist in the Sewanee–Vanderbilt game.

==== 1904 and 1905 ====
Bob Blake did not play in Dan McGugin's first year of 1904, but resumed play on the 1905 team.

==== 1906 ====
Vanderbilt won a major intersectional contest in 1906 when it defeated Carlisle 4–0 via a single, 17-yard Blake drop kick, "the crowning feat of the Southern Intercollegiate Athletic Association season." The score was 4 to 0, as field goals then counted for 4 points. College Football Hall of Fame inductee Albert Exendine was playing for Carlisle. Frank Mount Pleasant missed four field goals.

==== 1907 ====
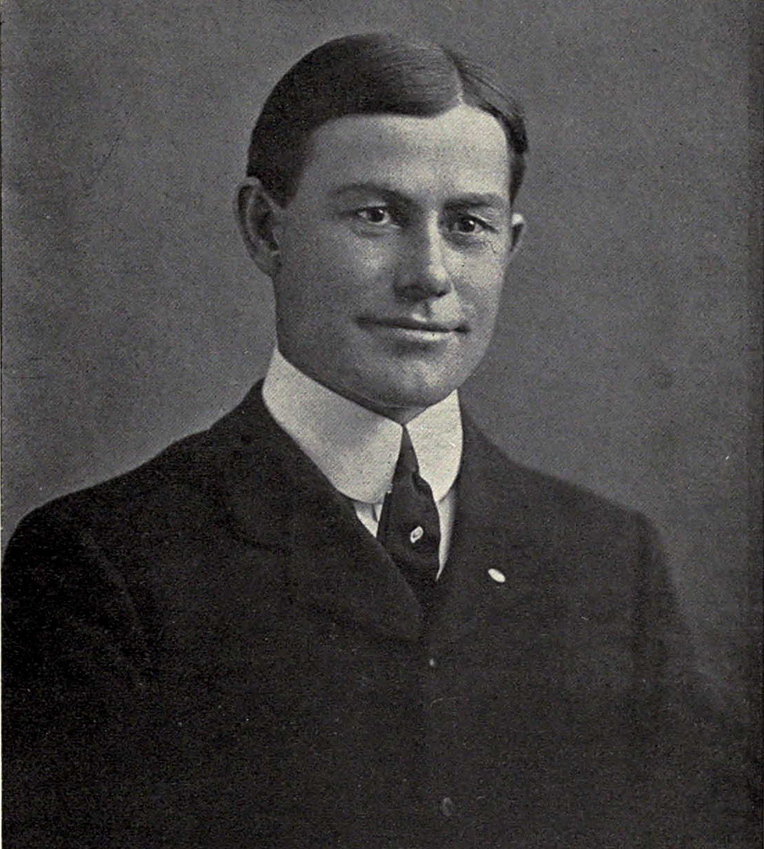
Michigan coach Fielding Yost (pictured) selected Blake first-team All-American.

He made Walter Camp's All-America Honorable Mention in 1907, as well as the first team All-American selection of Michigan coach Fielding Yost. Blake threw the pass to Stein Stone on a trick double-pass play which set up the score to beat Sewanee in 1907 for the SIAA championship, which was cited by Grantland Rice as the greatest thrill he ever witnessed in his years of watching sports. Blake missed two kicks on a slippery field in the 8–0 loss to Michigan.

== Coaching career ==
Blake assisted his brother, Frank, in coaching at Gordon Institute in 1907.

In 1910, Blake was awarded a law degree and returned to Vanderbilt for one season as an assistant football coach for Dan McGugin. The 1910 team shocked defending national champion Yale with a scoreless tie.

He coached at Montgomery Bell Academy in 1912.

== Later life ==
After practicing law in Nashville from 1911 to 1919, he engaged in business in St. Louis. He was elected to the board of directors of the International Shoe company in 1921, and directed the company since 1929.

Blake was president of the Missouri Constitutional Convention and awarded the "Man of the Year" award for Saint Louis in 1944.

Blake died on May 8, 1962, at his home in Webster Groves, Missouri.

== See also ==
- List of Vanderbilt University athletes
