= Grantland Rice =

American sportswriter (1880–1954)

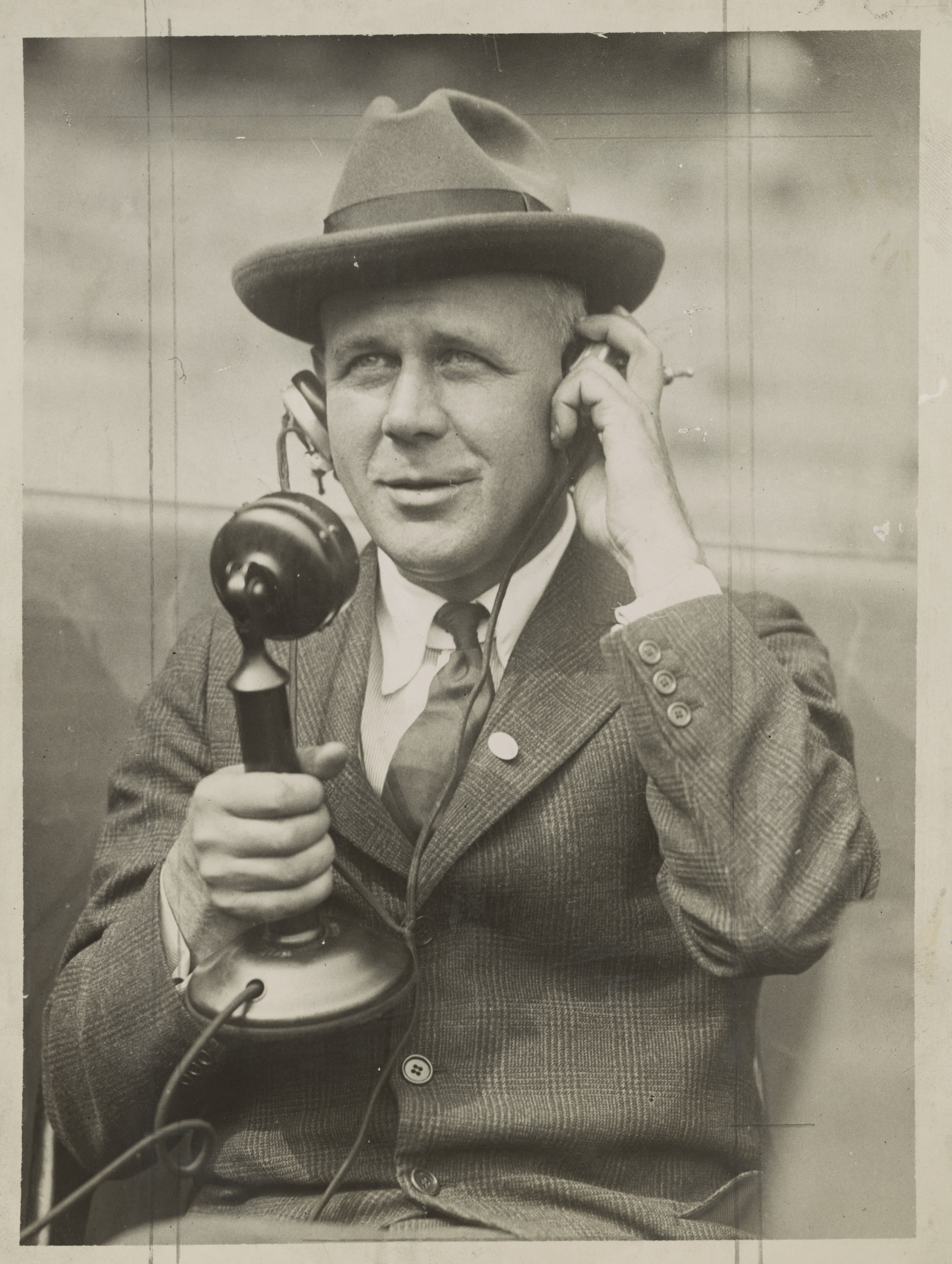
- Rice c. 1920
- Born: November 1, 1880; Murfreesboro, Tennessee, U.S.
- Died: July 13, 1954 (aged 73); New York City, U.S.
- Education: Vanderbilt University
- Occupation: Sportswriter
- Spouse: Fannie Katherine Hollis (m. 1906)
- Children: Florence Rice

Henry Grantland Rice (November 1, 1880 – July 13, 1954) was a sportswriter, columnist, and poet from Tennessee known as the "Dean of American Sports Writers". He published three books of poetry, and coined the famous phrase that it was not important whether you “won or lost, but how you played the game.” His writing was known for its elegance and published in newspapers around the country, and broadcast on the radio. He and his writing are among the reasons that the roaring 1920s in the United States are sometimes referred to as the "Golden Age of Sports".

In 1924, he nicknamed the Notre Dame backfield the "Four Horsemen". In 1925 he replaced Walter Camp in selecting college football All-America teams. Rice set out to make heroes of sports figures who impressed him, most notably in baseball Babe Ruth, in boxing Jack Dempsey, in football Red Grange and Knute Rockne, in golf Bobby Jones and Babe Didrikson, and in tennis Bill Tilden.

== Early life and education ==
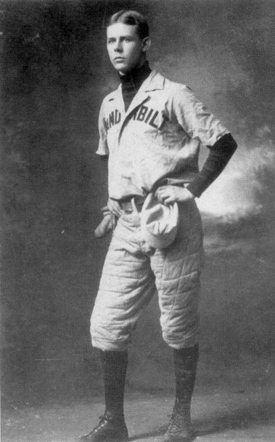
Rice at Vanderbilt University in 1901

Rice was born on November 1, 1880, in Murfreesboro, Tennessee, the son of Bolling Hendon Rice, a cotton dealer, and Mary Beulah (née Grantland) Rice. His grandfather Major Henry W. Grantland was a Nashville cotton farmer and a Confederate veteran of the Civil War. As a young teenager, Rice attended military schools—Tennessee Military Institute and Nashville Military Institute. After a year at Wallace University School, Rice attended Vanderbilt University in Nashville.

At Vanderbilt, Rice was a brother in the Phi Delta Theta fraternity. He studied Greek and Latin and graduated with a BA degree in classics as part of the class of 1901. Rice was tall and slender, over 6 feet tall and well under 140 pounds. He was a member of the football team for three years, and a shortstop on the baseball team. On the football team, he lettered in the year of 1899 as an end and averaged two injuries a year. He suffered a broken shoulder blade, a broken collar bone, and four broken ribs. On the baseball team, he was captain in 1901. Rice notes that pro baseball took off in the South in his senior year at Vanderbilt.

== Sportswriter ==
Rice's first job in 1901 was for the Nashville Daily News. From 1902 to 1907 he worked for the Atlanta Journal and the Cleveland News. Rice married Fannie Katherine Hollis on April 11, 1906; they had one child, the actress Florence Rice.

He became a sportswriter for the Nashville Tennessean in 1907, under owner-publisher Luke Lea. The job at the Tennessean was given to him by former Sewanee Tigers coach Billy Suter, who coached baseball teams against which Rice played while at Vanderbilt.

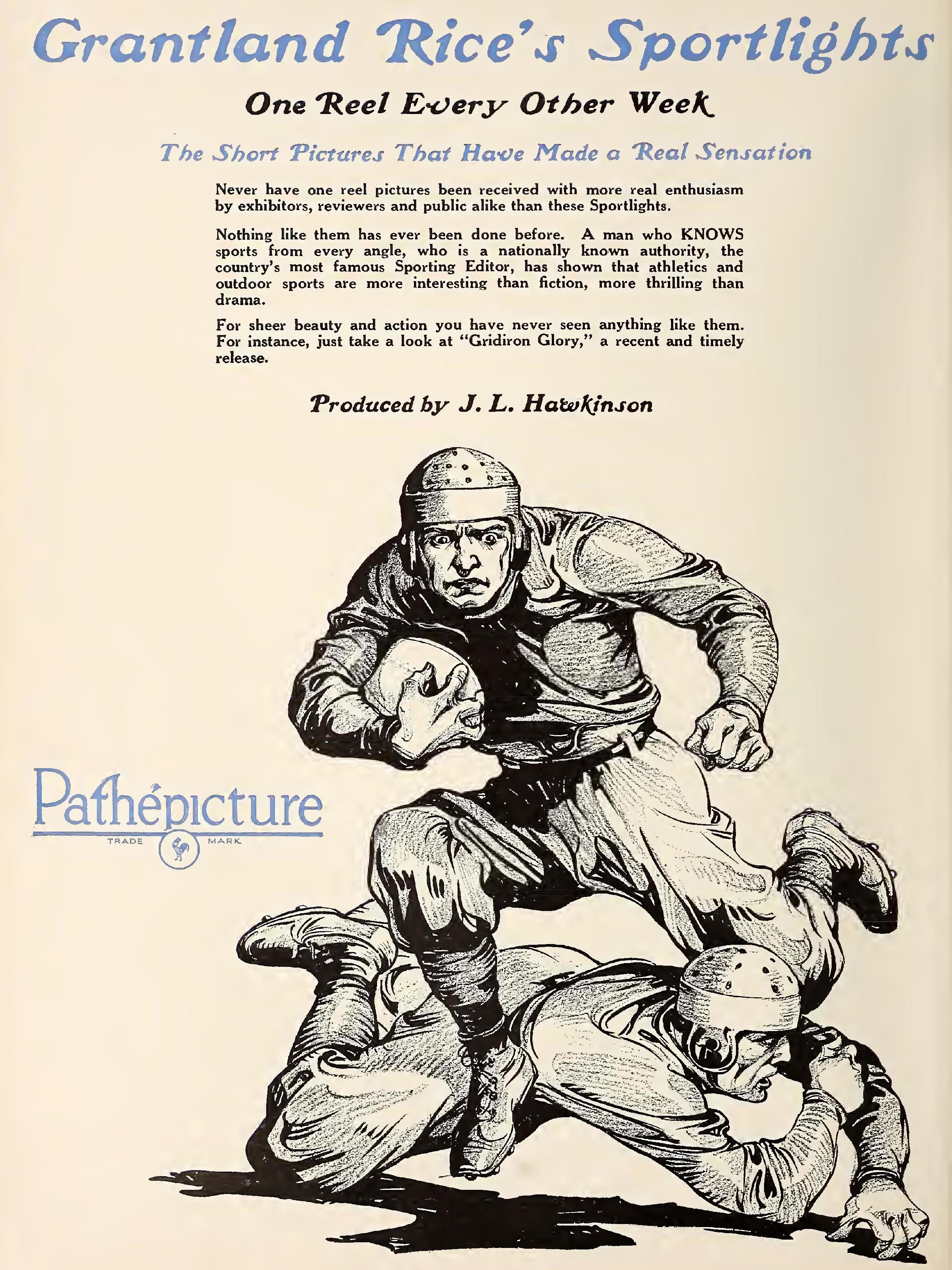
Grantland Rice's Sportlights ad in Exhibitor's Trade Review

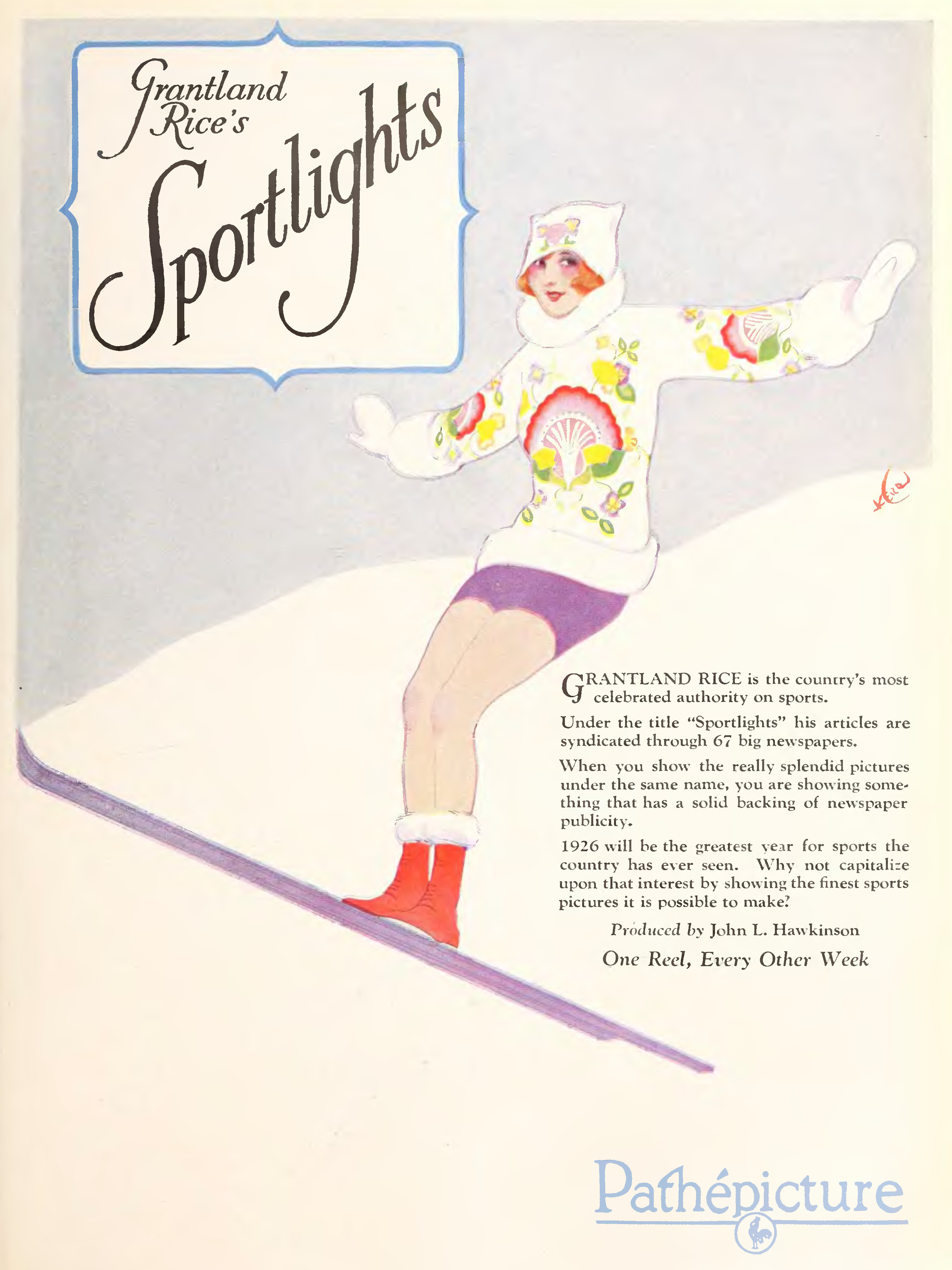
Grantland Rice Sportlights ad in Motion Picture News, 1926

Afterwards he obtained a series of prestigious jobs with major newspapers in the northeastern United States. In 1911 he was hired by the New York Evening Mail, and in 1914 he began his Sportlight column in the New York Tribune. He also provided monthly Grantland Rice Sportlights as part of Paramount newsreels from 1925 to 1954. He is best known for writing for Collier's.

He and his writing are among the reasons that the 1920s in the United States are sometimes referred to as the "Golden Age of Sports". He became even better known after his columns were nationally syndicated beginning in 1930, and became known as the "Dean of American Sports Writers".

Rice's writing tended to be of an "inspirational" or "heroic" style, raising games to the level of ancient combat and their heroes to the status of demigods. According to author Mark Inabinett in his 1994 work, Grantland Rice and His Heroes: The Sportswriter as Mythmaker in the 1920s, Rice very consciously set out to make heroes of sports figures who impressed him, most notably in baseball Babe Ruth, in boxing Jack Dempsey, in football Red Grange and Knute Rockne, in golf Bobby Jones and Babe Didrikson, and in tennis Bill Tilden. Unlike many writers of his era, Rice defended the right of football players such as Grange, and tennis players such as Tilden, to make a living as professionals, but he also decried the warping influence of big money in sports, once writing in his column:

Money to the left of them and money to the right
Money everywhere they turn from morning to the night
Only two things count at all from mountain to the sea
Part of it's percentage, and the rest is guarantee

Rice authored a book of poetry, Songs of the Stalwart, which was published in 1917 by D. Appleton and Company of New York. Respected for his writing beyond the world of sports, Rice accepted an invitation to join the Board of Trustees at Ithaca College in 1935.

=== Baseball ===
Rice coached the 1908 Vanderbilt baseball team. He dubbed the Nashville baseball stadium Sulphur Dell, and declared the 1908 Nashville vs. New Orleans game the "greatest game ever played in Dixie." Rice authored Baseball Ballads in 1910.

=== Football ===
In 1907, Rice saw what he would call the greatest thrill he ever witnessed in his years of watching sports during the Sewanee–Vanderbilt football game: the catch by Vanderbilt center Stein Stone, on a double-pass play thrown near the end zone by Bob Blake. It set up the touchdown run by Honus Craig that beat Sewanee at the very end for the SIAA championship. Vanderbilt coach Dan McGugin in Spalding's Football Guide's summation of the season in the SIAA wrote, "The standing. First, Vanderbilt; second, Sewanee, a mighty good second;" and that Sewanee halfback Aubrey Lanier "came near winning the Vanderbilt game by his brilliant dashes after receiving punts."

The Four Horsemen of Notre Dame.

He is best known for being the successor to Walter Camp in the selection of College Football All-America Teams for beginning in 1925, and for being the writer who dubbed the great backfield of coach Rockne's 1924 Notre Dame Fighting Irish football team the "Four Horsemen" of Notre Dame. A Biblical reference to the Four Horsemen of the Apocalypse, this famous account was published in the New York Herald Tribune on October 18, describing the Notre Dame vs. Army game played at the Polo Grounds in New York City:

Outlined against a blue-gray October sky the Four Horsemen rode again. In dramatic lore they are known as famine, pestilence, destruction and death. These are only aliases. Their real names are: Stuhldreher, Miller, Crowley and Layden. They formed the crest of the South Bend cyclone before which another fighting Army team was swept over the precipice at the Polo Grounds this afternoon as 55,000 spectators peered down upon the bewildering panorama spread out upon the green plain below.

— Grantland Rice, October 18, 1924

The passage added great import to the event described and elevated it to a level far beyond that of a mere football game. This passage, although famous, is far from atypical. Another famous passage celebrated Red Grange:

A streak of fire, a breath of flame
Eluding all who reach and clutch;
A gray ghost thrown into the game
That rival hands may never touch;
A rubber bounding, blasting soul
Whose destination is the goal — Red Grange of Illinois! (Note: When asked in a 1974 interview, "Was it Grantland Rice who dubbed you the Galloping Ghost?" Grange replied, "No, it was Warren Brown, who was a great writer with the Chicago American in those days.")

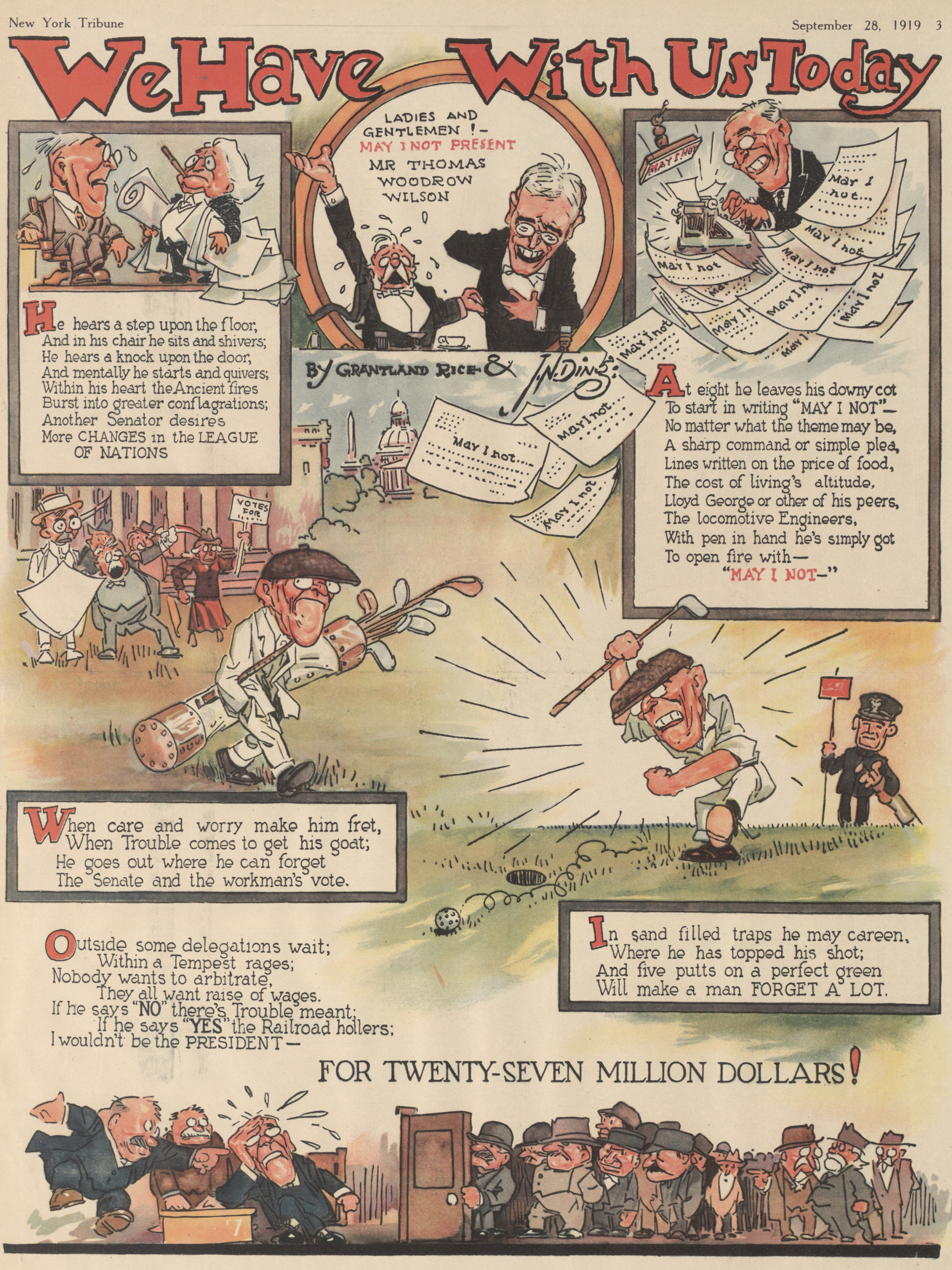
Cartoon about Woodrow Wilson playing golf, by Grantland Rice & Jay Norwood "Ding" Darling in the New York Tribune of September 28, 1919

Rice's all-time All-America backfield in 1939 was Jim Thorpe, Red Grange, Ken Strong, and Ernie Nevers. His all-time line was center Germany Schulz, guards Pudge Heffelfinger and Jack Cannon, tackles Fats Henry and Bill Fincher. Another all-time All-America selection in 1949 by Rice shows a backfield of Sammy Baugh, Thorpe, Grange, and Bronko Nagurski. His all time line was center Schulz, guards Heffelfinger and Herman Hickman, tackles Henry and Cal Hubbard, and ends Don Hutson and Bennie Oosterbaan.

=== Golf ===
Rice was an advocate for the emerging game of golf in the United States. He became interested in the sport in 1909 while covering the Southern Amateur at the Nashville Golf Club. (Note: It was not his first golf event, but it was the one that seemed to pull him toward the game. According to historian Ridley Wills II, wooden tees had not been invented in those days, and each golfer would use sand and water to make a homemade tee.) Rice took lessons from the club's pro Charlie Hall. Rice began playing there regularly and said "I never dreamed that golf would provide so must grist for my typewriter". Golfer and athlete Bradley Walker was active in the Nashville Golf Club and became a close friend of Rice.

Rice edited American Golfer magazine beginning in 1920, until 1936. He wrote extensively about golfer Bobby Jones and considered him the greatest-ever putter. When the Augusta National Golf Club was formed, Rice was one of the eighty charter members. Rice is a member of the New York State Golf Association Hall of Fame.

== First World War ==
Before leaving for service in World War I, he entrusted his entire fortune, about $75,000 (the equivalent of around $1.4 million today), to a friend. On his return from the war, Rice discovered that his friend had lost all the money in bad investments, and then had committed suicide. Rice accepted the blame for putting "that much temptation" in his friend's way. Rice then made monthly contributions to the man's widow throughout his life.

Rice fought in the 30th Division, lieutenant in the 115th Field Artillery. He spent fourteen months in military service.

One source recalls if you wanted to anger Rice, mention prizefighters who avoided fighting in World War I.

== Death and legacy ==
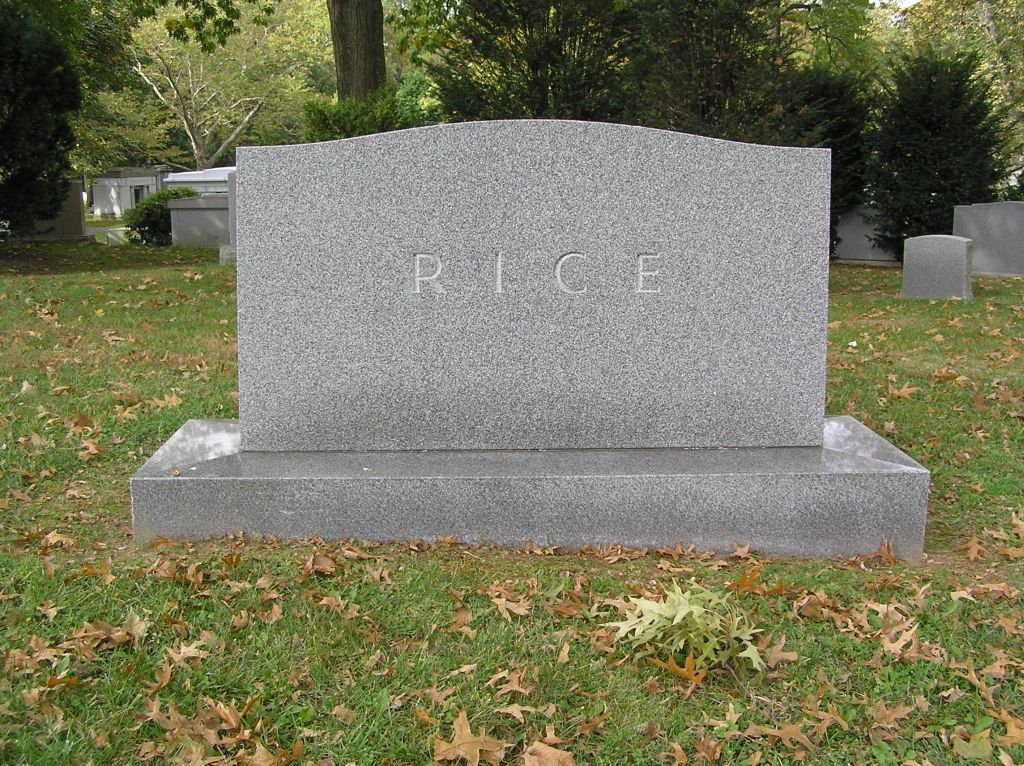
The grave of Grantland Rice in Woodlawn Cemetery

Rice died at the age 73 on July 13, 1954, following a stroke. Rice's autobiography The Tumult and the Shouting, the title a reference to Kipling, was published in 1954. He is interred at Woodlawn Cemetery in the Bronx, New York City.

=== Legacy ===
By one estimate, Rice wrote more than 22,000 columns and more than 67,000,000 words.

In 1951, in recognition of Rice's 50 years in journalism, an anonymous donor contributed $50,000 to establish the Grantland Rice Fellowship in Journalism with The New York Community Trust. In 1954, the Football Writers Association of America (FWAA) established the Grantland Rice Trophy, an annual award presented (from 1954 to 2013) to the college football team recognized by the FWAA as the national champions. The Grantland Rice Bowl, an annual college football bowl game held from 1964 to 1977, was named in his honor, as was the Grantland Rice Award given to the winner. Rice was posthumously awarded the 1966 J. G. Taylor Spink Award by the Baseball Writers' Association of America. The award, presented the following year at the annual induction ceremony at the Baseball Hall of Fame, is given for "meritorious contributions to baseball writing".

At Vanderbilt, a four-year scholarship named for Rice and former colleague and fellow Vanderbilt alumnus Fred Russell is awarded each year to an incoming first-year student who intends to pursue a career in sportswriting. Recipients of the Fred Russell–Grantland Rice Sportswriting Scholarship include author and humorist Roy Blount Jr.; Skip Bayless of Fox Sports and New York Times best-selling author, Andrew Maraniss. The press box in Vanderbilt Stadium at Vanderbilt University is dedicated to Rice and named after Rice's protégé, Fred Russell. For many years, a portion of one floor of the Columbia University Graduate School of Journalism was designated the "Grantland Rice Suite". Grantland Avenue in his hometown of Murfreesboro, Tennessee, was named in his honor.

Rice was mentioned in an I Love Lucy episode entitled "The Camping Trip", and was portrayed by actor Lane Smith, also a native of Tennessee, in The Legend of Bagger Vance. On June 8, 2011, ESPN's Bill Simmons launched a sports and popular culture website titled Grantland, a name intended to honor Rice's legacy. It operated for a little more than four years until being shuttered by ESPN on October 30, 2015, several months after Simmons's departure.
