= Double pass =

A double pass is a trick play in American football. A double pass is a backward pass followed by a second pass thrown downfield. The play starts with the quarterback throwing backward pass, generally overhand, to an eligible player. That player then throws a forward pass downfield to a third player. A variation of the play has the second downfield pass caught by the quarterback, who leaks out after throwing the initial pass. This often works well, because of the likelihood of the player being uncovered, as normally quarterbacks rarely run pass patterns.

Despite having a relatively high success rate, the double pass is considered one of the riskiest types of plays in football because the first pass must be a backward pass, and if a backward pass is dropped, it is a fumble (which may be recovered by the defending team) rather than an incomplete pass (which stops play).

A contemporary example of this play being successfully executed comes from the regular season game between University of Nebraska–Lincoln and University of Oklahoma on September 17, 2022, in which Oklahoma tight end Brayden Willis caught a backward pass from quarterback Dillon Gabriel, then made a forward pass to a third player, who received it for a touchdown against Nebraska.

The 2020 iteration of the XFL liberalized the rule to allow the initial pass to go forward as long as the second player remained behind the line of scrimmage. If the first pass was dropped, it counted as incomplete instead of a fumble. The XFL's successor United Football League introduced the same policy in 2025.
