= Honus Craig =

American football player and coach (1881–1942)

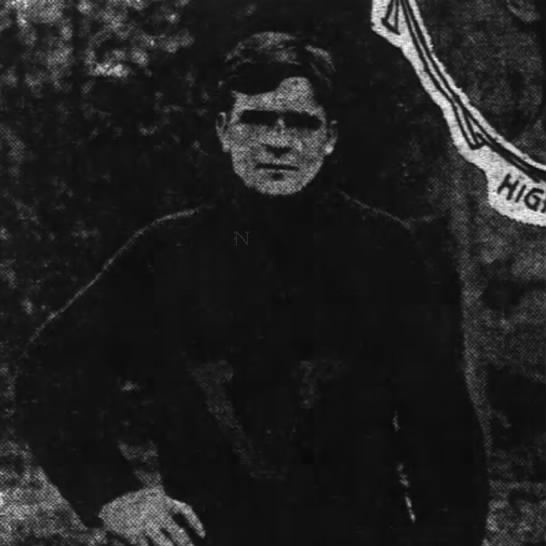
- Craig c. 1906

Biographical details
- Born: November 30, 1881; Culleoka, Tennessee, U.S.
- Died: April 18, 1942 (aged 59); Rally Hill, Maury County, Tennessee, U.S.

Playing career
- 1904–1907: Vanderbilt
- Position: Halfback

Coaching career (HC unless noted)
- 1908: Polytechnic (TX)
- 1909–1910: Terrill School for Boys

Accomplishments and honors

Awards
- 4× All-Southern (1904–1907); 1912 All-time Vandy 1st team. 1934 All-time Vandy team

John Livingston "Honus" Craig (November 30, 1881 – April 18, 1942) was an American college football player and coach.

== Early years ==
John Livingston Craig was born on November 30, 1881, in Culleoka, Tennessee, to Thompson Sloan Craig and Ella Cline.

== Playing career ==
=== Vanderbilt ===
Craig was a prominent halfback for Dan McGugin's Vanderbilt Commodores football teams which won four SIAA titles. He was also selected All-Southern four times. McGugin once called him the South's greatest athlete and Vanderbilt's greatest halfback. One report says "When Craig was confronted with the above formidable title yesterday by a reporter whose business it is to know such things, he blushed like a girl and tried to show why Dan McGugin's judgment is not always to be trusted." In Craig's opinion, Bob Blake was the South's greatest player. Craig stood 5 feet 9 inches and weighed 165 pounds. He was nominated though not selected for an Associated Press All-Time Southeast 1920-1969 era team. In 1915, John Heisman selected Craig for his list of the 30 greatest Southern football players.

==== 1906 ====
Vanderbilt had a major intersection for the first time when it defeated Carlisle in 1906 by a single Bob Blake drop kick, "the crowning feat of the Southern Intercollegiate Athletic Association season." Craig called this his hardest game, giving special praise to Albert Exendine as "the fastest end I ever saw."

==== 1907 ====
Craig went over for the touchdown to beat Sewanee in 1907, after the play which Grantland Rice called the greatest thrill he ever witnessed in his years of watching sports, the double-pass play ending with a pass from Bob Blake to Stein Stone. Earlier in the game Craig caught a 35-yard touchdown pass from Blake.

== Coaching career ==
Craig once coached at the Columbia Military Academy.

=== Polytechnic College ===
Craig was coach and athletic director at Texas Wesleyan University (then called Polytechnic College).

== Death ==
Craig died on April 18, 1942, in Maury County, Tennessee, while on a fishing trip. At the time of his death he was safety director for the Tennessee State Highway Department.
