= 1906 Marshall Thundering Herd football team =

American college football season

1906 Marshall Thundering Herd football
- Conference: Independent
- Record: 4–0–1
- Head coach: Pearl Rardin (1st season)
- Captain: Summer Sharp
- Home stadium: Central Field

1906 Southern college football independents records
	Conf.			Overall
Team	W	L	T	W		L		T
The Citadel		–		3	–	0	–	0
Kendall		–		2	–	0	–	0
Catholic University		–		1	–	0	–	0
Georgetown		–		6	–	1	–	0
Texas A&M		–		6	–	1	–	0
Delaware		–		5	–	1	–	0
Navy		–		8	–	2	–	2
Southwestern Louisiana Industrial		–		1	–	0	–	1
Stetson		–		3	–	1	–	0
Virginia		–		7	–	2	–	2
Howard (AL)		–		6	–	2	–	1
Oklahoma		–		5	–	2	–	2
VPI		–		5	–	2	–	2
Kentucky State		–		4	–	3	–	0
Davidson		–		3	–	2	–	2
Florida		–		5	–	3	–	0
North Carolina A&M		–		3	–	1	–	4
Louisiana Industrial		–		2	–	1	–	3
West Virginia		–		5	–	5	–	0
George Washington		–		4	–	3	–	2
VMI		–		4	–	4	–	0
Grant		–		3	–	3	–	0
Arkansas		–		2	–	4	–	2
TCU		–		2	–	5	–	0
North Carolina		–		1	–	4	–	2
Oklahoma A&M		–		1	–	4	–	2
Roanoke		–		1	–	4	–	2
Rollins		–		1	–	3	–	0
Birmingham		–		0	–	2	–	1
Goldey College		–		0	–	3	–	0

The 1906 Marshall Thundering Herd football team represented Marshall College (now Marshall University) as an independent during the 1906 college football season. Marshall posted an undefeated 4–0–1 record, outscoring its opposition 56–5. Home games were played on a campus field called "Central Field" which is presently Campus Commons.

== Schedule ==
Date	Time	Opponent	Site	Result	Source
October 6	3:00 p.m.	at Cincinnati	Burnet Woods; Cincinnati, OH	T 0–0	
October 20		Portsmouth High School	Central Field; Huntington, WV	W 24–0	
October 27		Georgetown (KY)	Central Field; Huntington, WV	W 10–0	
November 10		Ashland High School	Central Field; Huntington, WV	W 10–0	
November 29		Morris Harvey^{†}	Central Field; Huntington, WV	W 12–5	
^{†}Homecoming
