= Willie Heston =

American athlete (1878–1963)

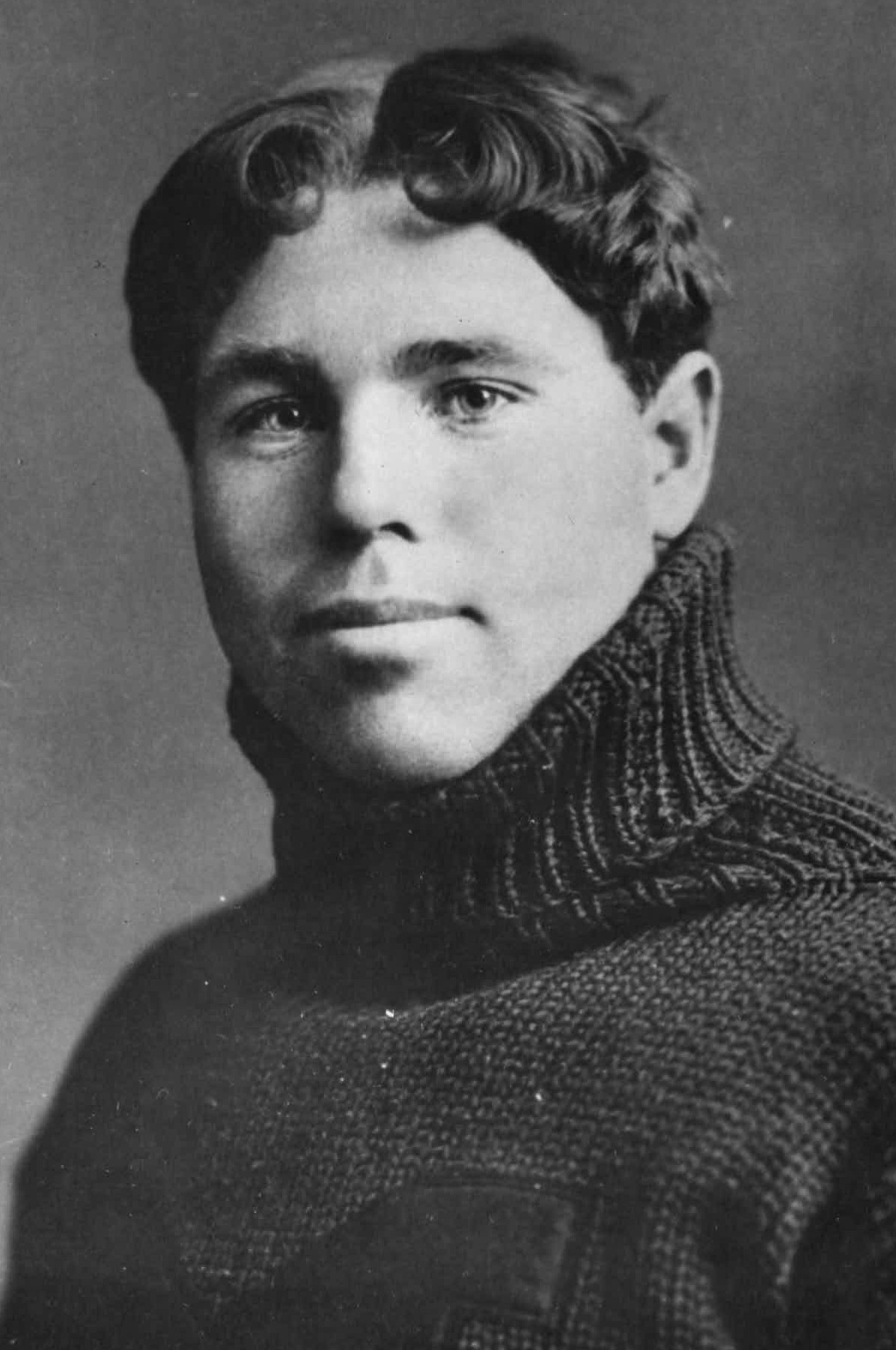

Biographical details
- Born: September 9, 1878; Galesburg, Illinois, U.S.
- Died: September 9, 1963 (aged 85); Traverse City, Michigan, U.S.

Playing career
- 1898–1900: San Jose Normal
- 1901–1904: Michigan
- 1906: Canton Bulldogs
- Position: Halfback

Coaching career (HC unless noted)
- 1905: Drake
- 1906: North Carolina A&M

Head coaching record
- Overall: 7–5–4

Accomplishments and honors

Awards
- 2× consensus All-American (1903, 1904); 2× Third-team All-American (1901, 1902); 4× First-team All-Western (1901−1904); Camp All-time All-America team; Yost All-time All-America team
- College Football Hall of Fame; Inducted in 1954 (profile)

William Martin Heston (September 9, 1878 – September 9, 1963) was an American football player and coach. He played halfback at San Jose State University and the University of Michigan. Heston was the head football coach for Drake University in 1905 and North Carolina College of Agriculture and Mechanic Arts, now North Carolina State University, in 1906. After he retired from coaching, he practiced law and served as a state court judge in Michigan. Heston was elected to the College Football Hall of Fame in 1954. He was selected by the Football Writers Association of America as the halfback for its all-time team for the first 50 years of the sport. University of Michigan coach Fielding H. Yost rated him as the greatest player of all-time.

== Early years ==
Heston was born in Galesburg, Illinois in 1878. His father, John William Heston, was a tenant farmer near Galesburg. At age four, Heston moved with his family to a river-bottom farm in Rippey, Iowa. Heston reportedly had two near-death experiences while living in Iowa, the first after contracting "whooping cough" and the second when he fell into the Raccoon River and had to be rescued by his sister.

At age nine, Heston moved with his family to a ranch in southwestern Kansas, where Heston was taken out of school to help the family raise money herding cattle. In 1894, Heston moved with his family to a farm in Grant's Pass, Oregon. As a teenager, he worked digging a ditch to supply water to a mine and chopping down and selling firewood.

The local high school principal, Professor Champ Price, met Heston and suggested that he attend high school. Heston attended Grants Pass High School starting in 1895, and it was there that his athletic ability as a runner was discovered. He graduated from high school in 1898 as the co-valedictorian of his class.

== Football player ==
=== San Jose State Normal School ===
In 1898, Heston enrolled at San Jose State Normal School (now San Jose State University) in San Jose, California, with plans to become a school teacher. Heston was introduced to football while attending San Jose State. San Jose's football coach, Jesse Woods, put Heston at the halfback position where he scored more touchdowns in his first year of football than any of the regular players. A newspaper reported on Heston in 1898: "A star run of left half Heston made 70 yards ... Heston was easily the star of the game. No better performance than his has been witnessed in this state."

San Jose's 1899 football team, with Heston as the captain, lost only one game, that being against the University of California. During the 1900 season, San Jose was undefeated and played Chico State Normal School to a 6-6 tie in the championship game. The teams agreed to a rematch three weeks later, and Stanford's coach Fielding H. Yost agreed to coach the San Jose State team in the two weeks leading up to the rematch. With Yost's guidance, San Jose State beat Chico State 46–0 in the rematch. (Note: Heston's biography at the College Football Hall of Fame provides a differing account of Heston's introduction to Yost. According to that account San Jose State played against Yost's Stanford team in 1900.) Heston received his teaching degree from San Jose State and accepted a teaching job in Oregon in 1901.

=== University of Michigan ===
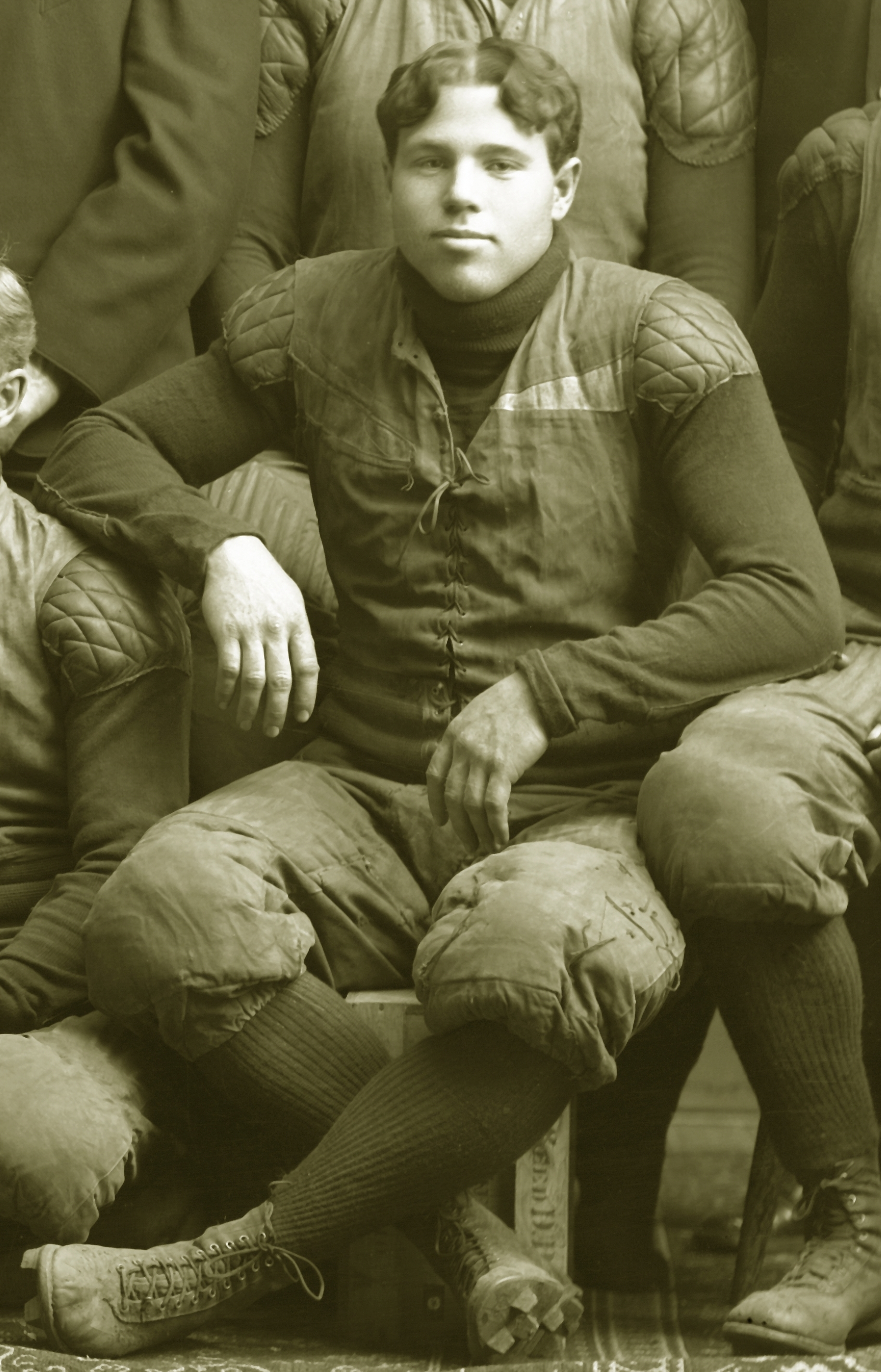
Heston in 1903

In the summer of 1901, Heston received a letter from coach Yost advising that he had been hired as the football coach at the University of Michigan and inviting Heston to continue his education at Michigan. Heston initially declined, but subsequently agreed and joined Yost at the University of Michigan in late summer of 1901. Heston was enrolled in the law school.

==== Statistics and awards ====
With Heston in the backfield, the Michigan Wolverines had four of the most successful seasons in the history of college football. The 1901 to 1904 teams became known as the "Point-a-Minute" teams because they averaged close to a point for every minute played. The 1901 team was 11-0 and outscored its opponents 555–0. The 1902 team was 11-0 and outscored its opponents 644–12. The 1903 team was 11-0-1 and outscored opponents 565–6. And the 1904 team was 10-0 and outscored its opponents 577–22. In Heston's four years as the starting left halfback, Michigan compiled an overall record of 43-0-1 and outscored its opponents 2,326–40.

During his four years at Michigan, Heston was known as a work-horse of the Wolverines' offense. In a 1903 game against the Chicago Maroons, the Michigan team gained 267 yards rushing, and Heston accounted for 237 of them. Noting the frequency with which Heston carried the ball, Ring Lardner wrote, "Michigan called Heston's signal. Maybe it was the only one they had."

Heston later wrote that his first touchdown at Michigan was his greatest thrill in football. His first game for Michigan was a September 1901 match against Albion College. Heston was put into the game in the second half. While sitting on the bench, he noticed that Albion's quarterback made long lateral passes to the backs. Heston snuck through the line, grabbed the ball as the quarterback was trying to throw it to a back, and ran the ball back 30 yards for his first Michigan touchdown.

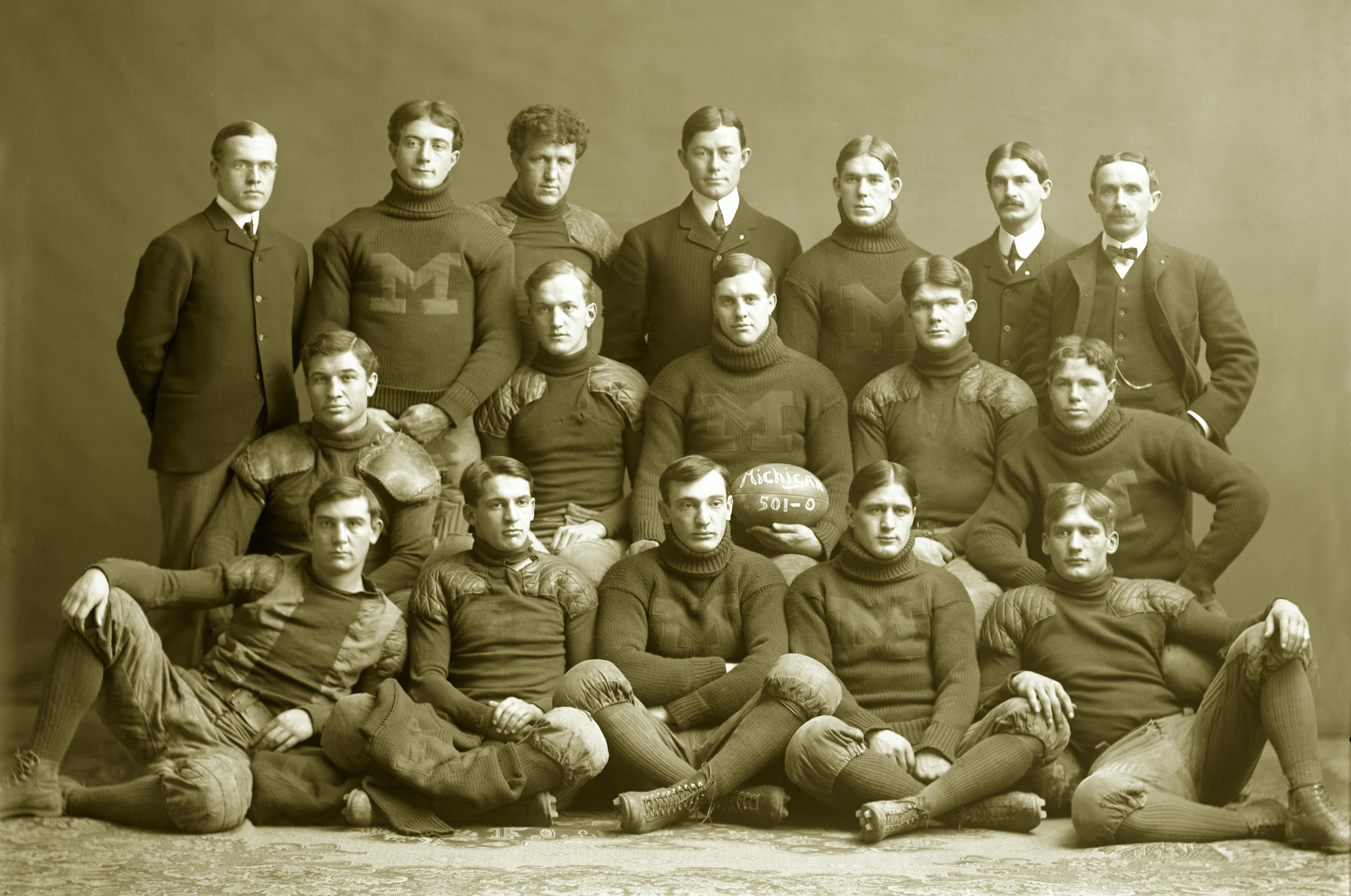
Michigan's 1901 "Point-a-Minute" team

In the inaugural Rose Bowl game played on January 1, 1902, Heston rushed for 170 yards on 18 carries, as Michigan defeated Stanford 49–0. Heston held the record for most rushing yards in a Rose Bowl game for 59 years.

Historic accounts differ on the number of touchdowns scored by Heston. In a letter to Grantland Rice in 1925, Fielding H. Yost claimed that Heston had scored 106 touchdowns at Michigan. The University of Michigan gives the total as 72 touchdowns, which it reports is still the school record. Other sources have variously reported that Heston scored 92 touchdowns, 93 touchdowns, and "more than 100 touchdowns."

In 2002, the NCAA published "NCAA Football's Finest," researched and compiled by the NCAA Statistics Service. The compilers were able to find rushing statistics for only 17 of Heston's games for Michigan and, subject to that caveat, published the following statistics:

Year	Carries	Rushing yards	Average	Touchdowns	Points (Note: Touchdowns were worth five points during Heston's era.)
1901	67	684	10.2	20	100
1902	56	487	8.7	15	75
1903	102	482	4.7	16	80
1904	54	686	12.7	21	105
Total	279	2339	8.4	72	360

Walter Camp selected Heston as a third-team All-American in 1901 and 1902 and as a first-team All-American in both 1903 and 1904. Although several sources cite Heston as the first player from outside the Ivy League to be picked as a first-team All-American, Clarence Herschberger of Chicago and William Cunningham of Michigan were the first, receiving the honor in 1898 from Camp and Caspar Whitney respectively.

==== Running style ====
At five feet eight inches and 185 pounds, Heston was described as being "compact and muscularly built." He was known for his quick starting ability. Archie Hahn, the 1904 Olympic gold medalist in the 100-meter run, was a classmate of Heston at the University of Michigan. Although Heston could not outrun Hahn at the 100-yard distance, he was regularly able to beat Hahn in impromptu 40-yard races. Walter Eckersall, who played against Heston and later became a football writer for the Chicago Tribune recalled that Heston "had an uncanny knack of gathering speed quickly and he frequently was penalized five yard for receiving the ball from the quarterback on a forward pass."

Heston also had what observers considered an uncanny ability to pivot and switch direction at full speed. Fielding Yost observed that "Heston could run full speed at a brick wall and, just before crashing into it, pivot and proceed alongside it with no diminishing of acceleration."

Eckersall described Heston as "a slashing, tearing back who drove off the tackles" who had "terrific driving power in his legs" and "a powerful stiff arm." Heston developed a reputation as a "hard, crunching runner who smashed through opposition when he couldn't outspeed his rivals." He was known as "a clever dodger in the open" who "used his hands with telling effect in warding off tacklers." In 1929, a newspaper reporter recalled Heston's running style as follows:

A strong arm helped Willie Sr., to move 'em. After cracking through that line the old arm would go out. You can still pick out men who used to play football against Michigan in '02 and '03, they say, because their faces seem just a little out of kilter. The straight arm in the old days sometimes wasn't so straight.

==== Defensive player ====
Heston played in the era when players remained in the game on both offense and defense. In 1954, the Chicago Tribune profiled Heston as one of the "Iron Men of Football's Glory Days." After the 1904 season, the "Football Guide" described Heston as "practically unhurtable." Though known primarily for his running and scoring, Fielding Yost said of Heston: "He was one of the greatest defensive backs, one of the hardest, surest tacklers that ever lived." Chicago's Walter Eckersall recalled: "On defense, Heston was just as valuable to his team. He was a quick thinker, who anticipated opponents' plays ... He was always in the vicinity of the ball and never appeared to tire."

==== Innovations ====
Heston has been acknowledged as the first to play at what later was designated as the tailback position on offense. Prior to Heston, left halfbacks ran plays in one direction, and right halfbacks ran plays in the other direction. Because of Heston's speed and agility, Yost placed Heston in the tailback position so that he could carry the ball on plays to either side of the line.

Heston's charging ability and open-field running have also been credited with leading to the origin of the "seven man line and a diamond on defense." Minnesota's College Football Hall of Fame coaching staff of Henry L. Williams and Pudge Heffelfinger devised the strategy in 1903 to stop Heston. Minnesota had previously used the then-traditional nine-man line with the fullback backing up the line and a safety man down the field. Heffelfinger suggested that the halfbacks be pulled out of the line and stationed behind the tackles, thus requiring Heston to break through an initial seven-man line and a secondary line consisting of the fullback and two halfbacks. Known as the Minnesota shift, the formation became a standard practice. In 1936, Arch Ward credited Heston with leading to one of the "noteworthy transitions" in football history. In 1943, NEA sports editor Harry Grayson credited Heston as the impetus for "a turning point from old style football to the modern game."

=== Professional football ===
In late 1904 or 1905, Heston reportedly sought to establish a bidding contest for his services among the professional football teams. The Massillon Tigers and the Akron East Ends were the leading professional teams at the time, and both teams were reported to be angling for Heston's services. Heston reportedly sent a telegram to the Massillon team advising that Akron had offered him $500 to play for them in a Thanksgiving Day game, and asking how much Massillon would be willing to pay. When Massillon learned the next day that Heston had sent a similar telegram to the Akron club, both clubs refused to do business with him. The Canton Bulldogs offered him $500 a game in August 1905, but Heston instead accepted a coaching position at Drake University for the 1905 season. One football writer has cited Heston as "pro football's first holdout."

In 1906, Heston signed to play for the Canton Bulldogs, reportedly for $600 and expenses. He next organized a team called "Willie Heston's All-Stars" to play a game against the Massillon Tigers at Chicago's Comiskey Park on Thanksgiving Day 1906. Early in the game, Heston broke a bone in his leg, ending his professional football career.

== Football coach ==
=== Drake ===
Heston was the head football coach for Drake University in Des Moines, Iowa for one season, in 1905, compiling a record of 4–4. His Drake team lost to Michigan, 48–0, but responded the following week with a "Point-a-Minute" win against Simpson College by a score of 75–0.

=== North Carolina A&M ===
In 1906, Heston served as the head football coach at North Carolina College of Agriculture and Mechanic Arts—now known as North Carolina State University. His 1906 North Carolina A&M Aggies football team posted a record of 3–1–4, outscoring its opponents 100–10. The team played scoreless ties against Virginia, Richmond, and Clemson. The one loss was to VPI by a score of 6–0. The three wins were all dominating shutouts, including a 40–0 win against William & Mary and a 17–0 win over VMI.

== Legal career ==
Heston received his law degree from the University of Michigan in 1904. In 1908, he established a law practice in Detroit, Michigan. He served as an assistant prosecuting attorney for Wayne County from 1911 to 1916. He became a judge on the Detroit Recorders criminal court bench in 1916 and continued in that capacity through 1923.

== Family and later years ==
Heston was married twice. After his first wife Lydia Frances Sisson died, he was married in 1956 at age 77 to the former Sarah E. Williams of Bay City, Michigan. He had two sons, John Heston and William M. Heston Jr., and a daughter, Frances. Both of his sons played varsity football for the University of Michigan.

In the 1930s, Heston went into the real estate business in Detroit. He also established a cemetery in Flat Rock, Michigan. Heston ran a half-mile every morning until he was age 75, and remained vigorous and active into his eighties. A short time before his death at age 85, Heston told a reporter, "I don't run the half mile any more and I've quit going to dances, but I smoke seven cigars a day and I'm having a lot of fun loafing and living."

Heston died on his 85th birthday in 1963. He suffered from a kidney ailment while staying at his summer home in Lake Manistee, Michigan, and he had been hospitalized for four weeks at a hospital in Traverse City prior to his death. The pallbearers at Heston's funeral were former Michigan Wolverines football All-Americans Ernie Vick, Jack Blott, Bennie Oosterbaan, Francis Wistert, Harry Newman, and Otto Pommerening.

== Historical honors and recognition ==
In the first half of the 20th century, Heston was ranked as one of the greatest players in football history.

Knute Rockne named Heston as the greatest back of all time: "Willie Heston gets my vote as the greatest back of all time. Since those days many wonderful backs have flashed on the gridiron, including Red Grange and my own Four Horsemen of 1924, and my choice is still Heston."

International News Service sports editor Frank G. Menke proclaimed Heston "the greatest halfback that America ever produced" and explained:

Heston was the irresistible force -- the human juggernaut. He hurled his compact, marvelous body into the most powerful human walls that were ever produced -- and split them asunder. Every team that played Michigan during the regime of Heston had orders to 'get Heston!' And none succeeded. Four men, six men, eight men, oftentimes threw themselves into the pathway of the charging Wolverine. And he crashed into -- and through -- those defenses as a bowling ball zips through the ten pins.

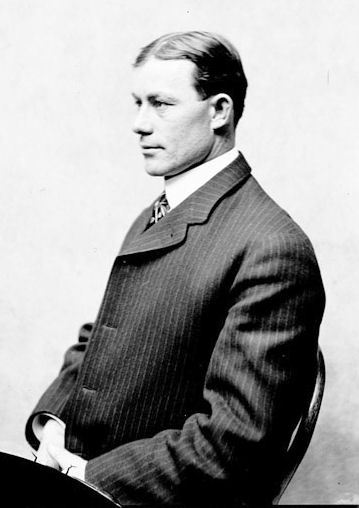
Fielding H. Yost rated Heston as the greatest player of all time.

Fielding Yost argued that Heston was the greatest player of all time. When some in the 1920s suggested that Red Grange may have surpassed Heston as the greatest back, Yost provided sports writer Grantland Rice with an eight-point argument as to why Heston was the greatest. Yost's points included the following:

1. He was the fastest starting back that ever lived. Heston could beat Archie Hahn every time at fifty yards, and Hahn was good for 9 4-5, then world's champion.

2. Heston was the quickest back for a shift or a thrust or a sidestep I ever saw. He was like lightning.

3. Heston was the most powerful runner of them all. Weighing 185 pounds, he was compactly built and struck with such terrific force that few could stand up before him. ...

5. He was never hurt.

6. He was equally great at ripping open a line or shooting through a broken field.

7. He made 106 touchdowns in four years. This would be equal to 636 points today. ... He gained over 500 yards from scrimmage in any number of single contests.

In 1953, Heston was inducted into the College Football Hall of Fame.

In 1969, in honor of the centennial of collegiate football, the Football Writers Association of America named two "College Football All-Time Teams" of eleven players — an "early" team consisting of players who played prior to 1920, and a "modern" team who played in 1920 and after. Heston was chosen as one of four backs for the pre-1920 squad.

== Head coaching record ==
Year	Team	Overall	Conference	Standing	Bowl/playoffs
Drake Bulldogs (Independent) (1905)
1905	Drake	4–4			
Drake:		4–4			
North Carolina A&M Aggies (Independent) (1906)
1906	North Carolina A&M	3–1–4			
North Carolina A&M:		3–1–4			
Total:		7–5–4			

== See also ==
- List of Michigan Wolverines football All-Americans
- University of Michigan Athletic Hall of Honor
