= J. White Guyn =

American football coach and city engineer (1883–1953)

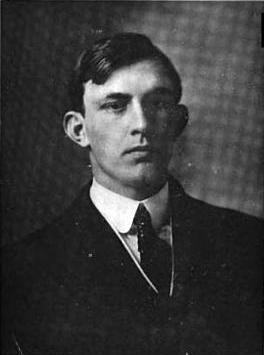
- Guyn at Kentucky in 1906

Biographical details
- Born: April 23, 1883; Kentucky, U.S.
- Died: April 15, 1953 (aged 69)

Playing career
- 1901–1905: Kentucky State College

Coaching career (HC unless noted)
- 1906–1908: Kentucky State College

Head coaching record
- Overall: 17–7–1

Joel White Guyn Jr. (April 23, 1883 – April 15, 1953) was an American college football coach and city engineer. He served as the head football coach at Kentucky State College—now known as the University of Kentucky—from 1906 to 1908, compiling a record of 17–7–1. Guyn was the city engineer of Lexington, Kentucky, for 31 years.

== Early life ==
Guyn attended the University of Kentucky, where he played on the football team from 1901 to 1905, and in 1905, served as its captain. Guyn played on the basketball team in 1904. He was a member of Pi Kappa Alpha.

== Coaching career ==
After he graduated, the university appointed Guyn as the team's head coach, a post he held without remuneration. Upon his hiring, the school yearbook, The Kentuckian, wrote, "Previous to the year 1906, State had secured foot ball coaches from the North, South, East, and West ... When the authorities began the task of selecting a man to train the squad of '06, they felt that among the alumni we had warriors just as capable as those sent forth from the great gridirons of the North and East."

Before the 1906 season, the Lexington Herald feared that financial difficulties would prevent Kentucky and Transylvania University, its traditional Thanksgiving Day intrastate rival, from fielding football teams. While Transylvania did indeed temporarily disband its team, Kentucky was able to maintain a squad. In his first season, Guyn arranged to play Centre College in Lexington on Thanksgiving, a game which the Herald wrote would be a de facto state championship and "swell the athletic association's treasury." Centre won the game, 12–6, in front of 3,500 spectators.

A shortage of funds continued, however, during Guyn's tenure, and in 1907, the program was unable to provide the team with proper equipment. That season, Transylvania renewed the sport, and the Crimson proceeded through its season undefeated before it met Kentucky in the finale. The game, originally scheduled for Thanksgiving, was postponed until December 5 due to heavy rains, which both schools feared would curtail gate receipts. Kentucky won, 5–0, in what was described as a "dull game" before a crowd half the size as expected.

Before the 1908 season, Kentucky lacked funds to equip several players, so the athletic association scheduled a game with Michigan in Ann Arbor in a bid to generate revenue. Travel costs limited the income, and on the gridiron, Kentucky was shut out, 62–0. The program did succeed in rescheduling Centre on Thanksgiving, and newly constructed stands and luxury boxes at Stoll Field seated the largest crowd in city history. Kentucky beat Centre, 40–0. The book Before Big Blue: Sports at the University of Kentucky, 1880–1940 noted that "these [Thanksgiving] games, and the revenue from them, saved the university sports program and prepared the way for a more modern athletic department in the next decade." With the money, Kentucky was able to purchase suitable equipment and hired a respected Eastern coach for the following season, Edwin Sweetland. Under Guyn, Kentucky amassed a 17–7–1 record during his tenure.

== Professional career ==
In 1910, Guyn was the city of Lexington's assistant engineer. By 1915, he was the city engineer, a post he held for 31 years. In 1934, he was working as the Lexington director of public works. In February 1949, Guyn was named the assistant supervising engineer of the medical and hospital services of the Kentucky state department of health. He died at a hospital on April 15, 1953, at the age of 69.

== Head coaching record ==
Year	Team	Overall	Conference	Standing	Bowl/playoffs
Kentucky State College Blue and White (Independent) (1906–1908)
1906	Kentucky State College	4–3			
1907	Kentucky State College	9–1–1			
1908	Kentucky State College	4–3			
Kentucky State College:		17–7–1			
Total:		17–7–1			
