= Clarence A. Short =

American football coach (1873–1947)

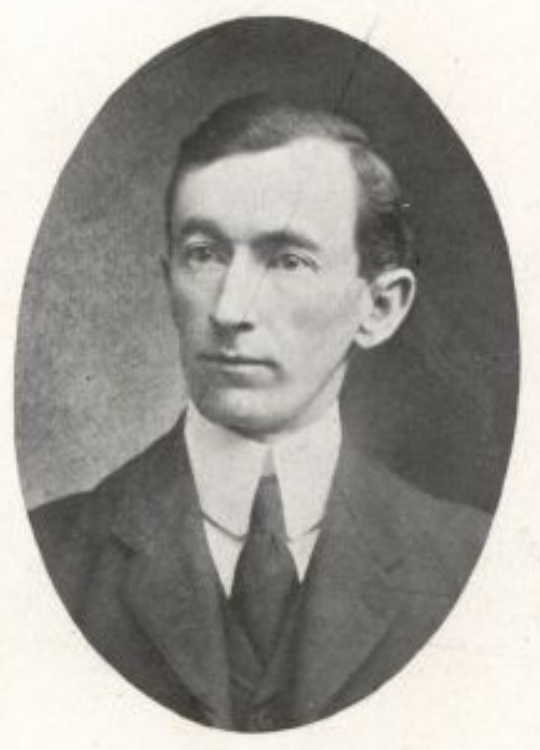
- Short pictured in The Blue Hen 1906, Delaware yearbook

Biographical details
- Born: July 1, 1873 near Georgetown, Delaware, U.S.
- Died: March 23, 1947 (aged 73); Lewes, Delaware, U.S.

Coaching career (HC unless noted)
- 1902, 1906: Delaware

Head coaching record
- Overall: 8–7–1

Clarence Albert Short (July 1, 1873 – March 23, 1947) was an American college football coach and educator. He served as the head football at Delaware College–now known as the University of Delaware–in 1902 and 1906, compiling a record of 8–7–1 in two seasons. Short was also assistant professor of mathematics and civil engineering during his time at Delaware College. He was serving as president of Wesley Collegiate Institute in 1926.

Short died on March 23, 1947, at his home in Lewes, Delaware.

== Head coaching record ==
Year	Team	Overall	Conference	Standing	Bowl/playoffs
Delaware (Independent) (1902)
1902	Delaware	3–5–1			
Delaware (Independent) (1906)
1906	Delaware	5–2			
Delaware:		8–7–1			
Total:		8–7–1			
