= 1906 George Washington Hatchetites football team =

American college football season

1906 George Washington Hatchetites football
- Conference: Independent
- Record: 4–3–2
- Head coach: Wilmer G. Crowell (1st season)

1906 Southern college football independents records
	Conf.			Overall
Team	W	L	T	W		L		T
The Citadel		–		3	–	0	–	0
Kendall		–		2	–	0	–	0
Catholic University		–		1	–	0	–	0
Georgetown		–		6	–	1	–	0
Texas A&M		–		6	–	1	–	0
Delaware		–		5	–	1	–	0
Navy		–		8	–	2	–	2
Southwestern Louisiana Industrial		–		1	–	0	–	1
Stetson		–		3	–	1	–	0
Virginia		–		7	–	2	–	2
Howard (AL)		–		6	–	2	–	1
Oklahoma		–		5	–	2	–	2
VPI		–		5	–	2	–	2
Kentucky State		–		4	–	3	–	0
Davidson		–		3	–	2	–	2
Florida		–		5	–	3	–	0
Maryland		–		5	–	3	–	0
North Carolina A&M		–		3	–	1	–	4
Louisiana Industrial		–		2	–	1	–	3
West Virginia		–		5	–	5	–	0
George Washington		–		4	–	3	–	2
VMI		–		4	–	4	–	0
Grant		–		3	–	3	–	0
Arkansas		–		2	–	4	–	2
TCU		–		2	–	5	–	0
North Carolina		–		1	–	4	–	2
Oklahoma A&M		–		1	–	4	–	2
Roanoke		–		1	–	4	–	2
Rollins		–		1	–	3	–	0
Birmingham		–		0	–	2	–	1
Goldey College		–		0	–	3	–	0

The 1906 George Washington Hatchetites Colonials football team was an American football team that represented George Washington University as an independent during the 1906 college football season. In their first season under head coach Wilmer G. Crowell, the team compiled a 4–3–2 record.

== Schedule ==
Date	Opponent	Site	Result	Attendance	Source
September 29	Washington Navy Yard	Van Ness Park; Washington, DC	W 11–0		
October 6	at Lehigh	Lehigh Field; South Bethlehem, PA	L 0–6		
October 13	Gallaudet	Van Ness Park; Washington, DC	W 27–0		
October 20	at Swarthmore	Whittier Field; Swarthmore, PA	L 0–17		
October 27	Western Maryland	Van Ness Park; Washington, DC	W 8–5		
November 3	Randolph–Macon	Van Ness Park; Washington, DC	W 22–0		
November 9	Baltimore Medical	Van Ness Park; Washington, DC	T 0–0		
November 17	Virginia	American League Park; Washington, DC	T 0–0	3,000	
November 29	at Georgetown	Georgetown Field; Washington, DC	L 6–16	7,500	
