= 1906 Delaware football team =

American college football season

1906 Delaware football
- Conference: Independent
- Record: 5–1
- Head coach: Clarence A. Short (2nd season)
- Captain: Charles Messick

1906 Southern college football independents records
	Conf.			Overall
Team	W	L	T	W		L		T
The Citadel		–		3	–	0	–	0
Kendall		–		2	–	0	–	0
Catholic University		–		1	–	0	–	0
Georgetown		–		6	–	1	–	0
Texas A&M		–		6	–	1	–	0
Delaware		–		5	–	1	–	0
Navy		–		8	–	2	–	2
Southwestern Louisiana Industrial		–		1	–	0	–	1
Stetson		–		3	–	1	–	0
Virginia		–		7	–	2	–	2
Howard (AL)		–		6	–	2	–	1
Oklahoma		–		5	–	2	–	2
VPI		–		5	–	2	–	2
Kentucky State		–		4	–	3	–	0
Davidson		–		3	–	2	–	2
Florida		–		5	–	3	–	0
Maryland		–		5	–	3	–	0
North Carolina A&M		–		3	–	1	–	4
Louisiana Industrial		–		2	–	1	–	3
West Virginia		–		5	–	5	–	0
George Washington		–		4	–	3	–	2
VMI		–		4	–	4	–	0
Grant		–		3	–	3	–	0
Arkansas		–		2	–	4	–	2
TCU		–		2	–	5	–	0
North Carolina		–		1	–	4	–	2
Oklahoma A&M		–		1	–	4	–	2
Roanoke		–		1	–	4	–	2
Rollins		–		1	–	3	–	0
Birmingham		–		0	–	2	–	1
Goldey College		–		0	–	3	–	0

The 1906 Delaware football team represented Delaware College—now known as the University of Delaware–as an independent during the 1906 college football season. Led by Clarence A. Short in his second and final year as head coach, Delaware compiled a record of 5–1.

== Schedule ==
Date	Opponent	Site	Result	Source
September 29	Medico-Chirurgical	Newark, DE	W 10–0	
October 13	at Johns Hopkins	Baltimore, MD	W 5–0	
October 20	at Washington College	Chestertown, MD	W 9–0	
October 27	at Rutgers	New Brunswick, NJ	W 4–0	
November 3	at Pennsylvania Military	Chester, PA	W 12–0	
November 10	at Fordham	Fordham Field; Bronx, NY	L 4–16	
