= Sally Miles =

American sports player, coach, and college administrator

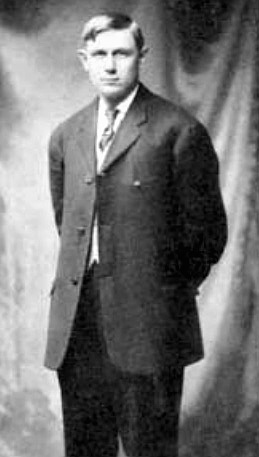
- Miles pictured in The Bugle 1907, Virginia Tech yearbook

Biographical details
- Born: June 21, 1879
- Died: May 2, 1966 (aged 86)

Playing career

Football
- 1900–1902: VPI
- Position: Tackle

Coaching career (HC unless noted)

Football
- 1905–1906: VPI

Baseball
- 1908: VPI
- 1913: VPI

Administrative career (AD unless noted)
- 1920–1934: VPI

Head coaching record
- Overall: 14–3–2 (football); 6–7–1 (baseball)

Accomplishments and honors

Championships
- 1 Southern (1905)

Clarence Paul "Sally" Miles (June 21, 1879 – May 2, 1966) was an American football and baseball player, coach, and college administrator. He served as the head football coach at Virginia Agricultural and Mechanical College and Polytechnic Institute (VPI)—now known as Virginia Tech—from 1905 to 1906, compiling a record of 14–3–2. Miles also was the head baseball coach at VPI in 1908 and 1913. He served as the school's athletic director from 1920 to 1934.

Known as "Mr. VPI," Miles spent nearly 59 years at Virginia Tech in a variety of capacities. His contributions have been recognized by the university by naming a playing field, a football stadium, Miles Stadium, that once stood directly behind the War Memorial Gym (where Payne Hall, Pedrew-Yates Hall, and New Residence Hall East, now stand), a professorship, and a building on the Virginia Tech campus in his honor. Miles died two weeks before the dedication of Clarence P. Miles Hall, a residence hall that houses 217 male students.

Miles' nickname "Sally" was a shortened form of "Salskinner," which he brought with him from high school. As an undergraduate, Miles was captain of the baseball team. As a graduate student, he was captain of the football team and was named to the first team of the All-Southern team as a tackle. Miles remained on campus to teach German (personal knowledge), chemistry, and to coach football and baseball. Miles' 1905 team is credited with VPI's first-ever victory over Virginia. Tech and Virginia did not play again until 1923.

Miles also served as athletic director, treasurer and dean of the college (then a combined version of a provost and admissions director). He helped organize the Southern Conference, serving as its president. Miles tried, but failed to earn membership for Virginia Tech in the Atlantic Coast Conference shortly after it was formed in 1953. Virginia Tech ultimately joined in ACC in 2004.

Miles was inducted into the Virginia Sports Hall of Fame (the state-wide organization that recognizes athletic achievements by state natives, or who played or coached for teams in the state) in 1974, and into the Virginia Tech Sports Hall of Fame in 1982.

== Head coaching record ==
=== Football ===
Year	Team	Overall	Conference	Standing	Bowl/playoffs
VPI (Independent) (1905–1906)
1905	VPI	9–1			
1906	VPI	5–2–2			
VPI:		14–3–2			
Total:		14–3–2			
