= 1906 Florida football team =

American college football season

1906 Florida football
- Conference: Independent
- Record: 5–3
- Head coach: Jack Forsythe (1st season)
- Offensive scheme: Minnesota shift
- Captain: Thomas Guy Hancock
- Home stadium: The Ballpark

1906 Southern college football independents records
	Conf.			Overall
Team	W	L	T	W		L		T
The Citadel		–		3	–	0	–	0
Kendall		–		2	–	0	–	0
Catholic University		–		1	–	0	–	0
Georgetown		–		6	–	1	–	0
Texas A&M		–		6	–	1	–	0
Delaware		–		5	–	1	–	0
Navy		–		8	–	2	–	2
Southwestern Louisiana Industrial		–		1	–	0	–	1
Stetson		–		3	–	1	–	0
Virginia		–		7	–	2	–	2
Howard (AL)		–		6	–	2	–	1
Oklahoma		–		5	–	2	–	2
VPI		–		5	–	2	–	2
Kentucky State		–		4	–	3	–	0
Davidson		–		3	–	2	–	2
Florida		–		5	–	3	–	0
North Carolina A&M		–		3	–	1	–	4
Louisiana Industrial		–		2	–	1	–	3
West Virginia		–		5	–	5	–	0
George Washington		–		4	–	3	–	2
VMI		–		4	–	4	–	0
Grant		–		3	–	3	–	0
Arkansas		–		2	–	4	–	2
TCU		–		2	–	5	–	0
North Carolina		–		1	–	4	–	2
Oklahoma A&M		–		1	–	4	–	2
Roanoke		–		1	–	4	–	2
Rollins		–		1	–	3	–	0
Birmingham		–		0	–	2	–	1
Goldey College		–		0	–	3	–	0

The 1906 Florida football team was the first intercollegeate football squad fielded by the University of Florida, which was established in 1905 and opened its new Gainesville campus for the 1906–1907 academic year. Florida was a member of the Intercollegiate Athletic Association of the United States (IAAUS) but was not yet affiliated with an athletic conference. The university had not yet constructed on-campus sports facilities, so until 1911, its football and baseball teams played and practiced at a municipal park near downtown Gainesville known simply as The Ballpark.

The University of Florida did not adopt the "Gators" nickname for its sports teams until 1911, so early football squads were usually called simply "the Orange and Blue." The 1906 squad was nicknamed "Pee Wee's Boys" in honor of their player-coach, 24-year old Jack "Pee Wee" Forsythe. Forsythe had played for two years at Clemson under coach John Heisman and then transferred to Florida State College in Tallahassee, where he was a player-coach for one season before the school became Florida Female College and ended its football program after the 1904 season

The 1906 Florida squad played an eight-game schedule - five contests against amateur athletic clubs and three against nearby private colleges, with three games played in Gainesville. The team finished the program's inaugural season with a 5–3 record.

== Background ==
=== Predecessor programs ===
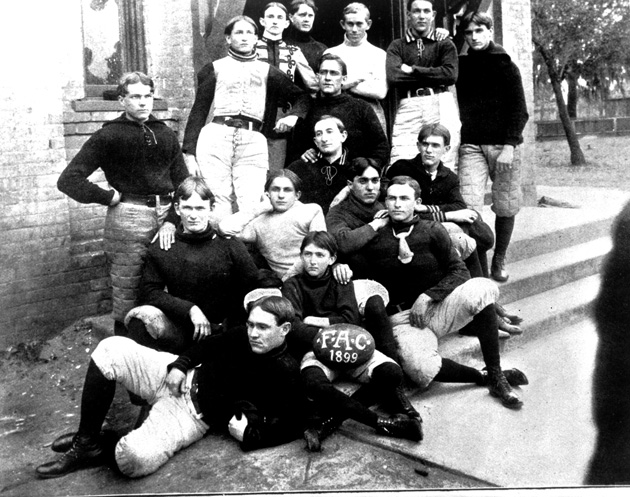
The 1899 FAC team, the first football team from any of UF's predecessor institutions

The modern University of Florida was created in 1905 when the Buckman Act consolidated four smaller state-supported institutions to create a university for men in Gainesville. Two of those predecessor schools - the East Florida Seminary in Gainesville and Florida Agricultural College (FAC) in Lake City - organized football programs and played a limited slate of games. FAC had adopted the name "University of Florida" in 1903, and in 1904, the school had attempted to jumpstart its football program by scheduling an ambitious slate against southern powers such as Auburn and Georgia. The attempt was not successful, as the "Blue and White" went 0–5. Both the East Florida Seminary and Florida Agricultural College ceased to exist after the 1904–05 school year.

=== Cancelled 1905 season ===
1905 was a year of transition. While construction had begun on the "University of the State of Florida" campus in Gainesville, the facilities would take some time to complete, so the new school was temporarily housed at the existing FAC Lake City campus during the 1905–06 academic year.

Nevertheless, the school attempted to field a football team in the autumn of 1905. C. A. Holton was hired as the school's football coach, William M. Rowlett was named team captain, and the school scheduled a few games against nearby colleges and clubs. However, due to a variety of problems, the squad was only able to complete one half of one game on the season. Several games were cancelled due to a large number of players being declared ineligible by university president Andrew Sledd, who was determined to establish the school's academic credentials, and a potential state championship with Stetson never materialized due to disputes over location. Florida finally took the field for their last scheduled game, a contest against the Landon Institute of Jacksonville in which Florida held a 6–0 lead at halftime. It was discovered during the intermission that Landon's squad included professional players, and Florida's team refused to resume the game. The abortive 1905 season was described by Tom McEwen as "lame duck, confusing, and troubled."

Besides player-coach Pee Wee Forsythe, no players who participated in the defunct football programs of Florida Agricultural College, the East Florida Seminary, or Florida State College are known to have also played for the University of Florida at Gainesville, and only tackle William Gibbs of the 1905 Lake City squad is known to have played on UF's first official team in 1906.

=== Rule changes ===
Florida's program was established at a time when the future of college football was in doubt. Reoccurring violence during games and the deaths of several players led to a growing movement to ban the sport in the early 1900s, as dangerous tactics such as the flying wedge, punching, kicking, piling-on, and other dangerous actions were permissible under the rules. The 1905 college football season was particularly brutal, with The Chicago Tribune referring to the campaign as a "death harvest" due to the 19 player deaths and 137 serious injuries incurred. (Note: Union College halfback Harold Moore died of a cerebral hemorrhage after being kicked in the head while attempting to tackle an NYU runner.)

Under pressure from president Theodore Roosevelt, the precursor to the modern NCAA was formed to formulate a new set of rules for the 1906 season. These radical changes including the legalization of the forward pass, allowing the punting team to recover an on-side kick as a live ball, abolishing the dangerous flying wedge, creating a neutral zone between offense and defense, and doubling the first-down distance to 10 yards, to be gained in three downs.

Owing to the new rules, Coach Forsythe employed the Minnesota shift, an offensive system that attempted to confuse the defense through misdirection rather than simply attempting to push ahead with brute force. Still, like most teams at the time, Florida relied on the running game and special teams to score points.

== Schedule ==
Date	Time	Opponent	Site	Result	Attendance
October 13		Gainesville Athletic Club	The Ballpark; Gainesville, FL	W 16–6	
October 20		at Mercer	Central City Park; Macon, GA	L 0–12	
October 26	3:15 p. m.	Rollins	The Ballpark; Gainesville, FL	W 6–0	150
November 2		Riverside Athletic Club	The Ballpark; Gainesville, FL	W 19–0	
November 4		at Savannah Athletic Club	Savannah, GA	L 2–27	
November 11		at Rollins	Winter Park, FL	L 0–5	
November 18?		at Athens Athletic Club	Athens, GA	W 10–0	
November 30?		at Riverside Athletic Club	Jacksonville, FL	W 39–0	

== Game summaries ==
=== Gainesville A. C. ===
Gainesville A. C. at Florida

Team	1	2	Total
Gainesville	0	6	6
• Florida	11	5	16

- Date: October 13
- Location: The Ballpark • Gainesville, FL

The University of Florida beat the Gainesville Athletic Club 16–6, the Gainesville team scoring on a fumble recovery in the second half.

=== Mercer ===
Florida at Mercer

Team	1	2	Total
Florida	0	0	0
• Mercer	6	6	12

- Date: October 20
- Location: Central City Park • Macon, GA

In the second week of play, coach E. E. Tarr started Mercer's early winning streak over Florida with a 12–0 win. Florida played its first game in Macon. A fumble changed the momentum of the second half. Mercer's Dickey ran 40 yards around right end for the touchdown.

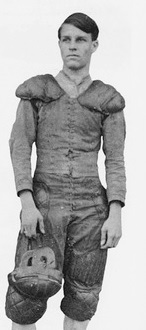
Roy Corbett in uniform

The starting lineup was Clarke (left end), Neilson (left tackle), Earman (left guard), Barrs (center), Wissen (right guard), Rodder (right tackle), Graham (right end), Thompson (quarterback), Forsyth (left halfback), Corbett (right halfback), Hancock (fullback).

=== Rollins ===
Rollins at Florida

Team	1	2	Total
Rollins	0	0	0
• Florida	0	6	6

- Date: October 26
- Location: The Ballpark • Gainesville, FL
- Game start: 3:15 p. m.
- Game attendance: 150

"Pee Wee's Boys" beat the Rollins Tars 6–0 in their first intercollegiate game played in Gainesville, Florida on October 26, 1906. The game was played on a baseball field just north of where Florida Field is today.

The game was scoreless in the first half, Florida getting the win late. Roy Corbett ran 25 yards around left end for the game's only touchdown. Shands kicked goal.

=== Riverside A. C. ===
Riverside A. C. at Florida

Team	1	2	Total
Riverside	0	0	0
• Florida	13	6	19

- Date: November 2
- Location: The Ballpark • Gainesville, FL

Florida beat the Riverside Athletic Club of Jacksonville 19–0. Shands scored by catching a 15-yard forward pass. The goal was kicked by Forsythe, who was the star of the game. Hancock also scored a touchdown, and Gibbs snuffed out a trick play. Florida scored once more in the second half.

=== Savannah A. C. ===
The Florida team suffered a defeat to the Savannah Athletic Club, 27–2. Savannah outweighed Florida by some 30 pounds, and Florida was proud of giving Savannah a better game than Stetson.

=== Rollins ===
Florida at Rollins

Team	1	2	Total
• Rollins	0	5	5
Florida	0	0	0

- Date: November 11
- Location: Winter Park, FL

Rollins won the second game, 5–0. Again neither team scored until the final few minutes. Donald Cheney scored Rollins' touchdown. Coach Forsythe resigned to accept a position as player-coach with the Riverside team, and the team disbanded only to later reunite under interim coach and ROTC Lieutenant L. R. Ball.

=== Athens A. C. ===
Athens Athletic Club fell to Florida 10–0.

=== Riverside A. C. ===
Florida again beat Riverside Athletic Club 39–0.

== Players ==
Player	Position	Games started	High school	Height	Weight	Age
Albert Baars	center					
J. B. Earman	end					
Pee Wee Forsythe	end					
William Gibbs	tackle					
Pat Graham	end					
Kent Johnson	end					
Alf Neilsen	tackle					
Ralph Radar	tackle					
C. Thompkins	end					
R. M. Whidden	guard					
Roy Corbett	right halfback					
Thomas Guy Hancock	fullback					
Jim Shands	left halfback					
T. C. Thompson	quarterback					
Arthur Albertson
A. C. Bennett
D. S. Bryan
H. B. Coe
James Kirk
Guy McCord
Charles Puleston
A. I. Roe

== Bibliography ==
- Carlson, Norm (2007). University of Florida Football Vault: The History of the Florida Gators. Atlanta, Georgia: Whitman Publishing, LLC.
- Horne, Larry E. (2012). Florida Gators IQ. ISBN 978-1-4499-8947-7.
- McCarthy, Kevin M (2000). Fightin' Gators: A History of University of Florida Football. Mount Pleasant, South Carolina: Arcadia Publishing. ISBN 978-0-7385-0559-6.
- McEwen, Tom (1974). The Gators: A Story of Florida Football. Huntsville, Alabama: The Strode Publishers. ISBN 0-87397-025-X.
