= Herbert McNaspy =

American football coach

Biographical details
- Born: September 16, 1886; Kansas, U.S.
- Died: April 26, 1913 (aged 26); Carencro, Louisiana, U.S.

Coaching career (HC unless noted)
- 1906: Southwestern Louisiana

Head coaching record
- Overall: 1–0–1

Herbert McNaspy (September 16, 1886 – April 26, 1913) was an American college football coach. He served as the head football coach at the University of Louisiana at Lafayette (then known as Southwestern Louisiana Industrial Institute) in 1906. He was the brother of fellow Ragin' Cajun head coach Clement J. McNaspy.

== Head coaching record ==
Year	Team	Overall	Conference	Standing	Bowl/playoffs
Southwestern Louisiana Industrial (Independent) (1906)
1906	Southwestern Louisiana Industrial	1–0–1			
Southwestern Louisiana Industrial:		1–0–1			
Total:		1–0–1			
