= Zack T. Young =

American football player and coach

Playing career
- 1902–1905: Louisiana Industrial
- Position: Quarterback

Coaching career (HC unless noted)
- 1906: Louisiana Industrial

Head coaching record
- Overall: 2–1–3

Zack T. Young was an American college football player and coach. He served as the head football coach at Louisiana Industrial Institute—now known as Louisiana Tech University—in 1906, compiling a record of 2–1–3. Prior to coaching, Young was a starting quarterback for his alma mater.

== Head coaching record ==
Year	Team	Overall	Conference	Standing	Bowl/playoffs
Louisiana Industrial (Independent) (1906)
1906	Louisiana Industrial	2–1–3			
Louisiana Industrial:		2–1–3			
Total:		2–1–3			
