= 1906 Texas Longhorns football team =

American college football season

1906 Texas Longhorns football
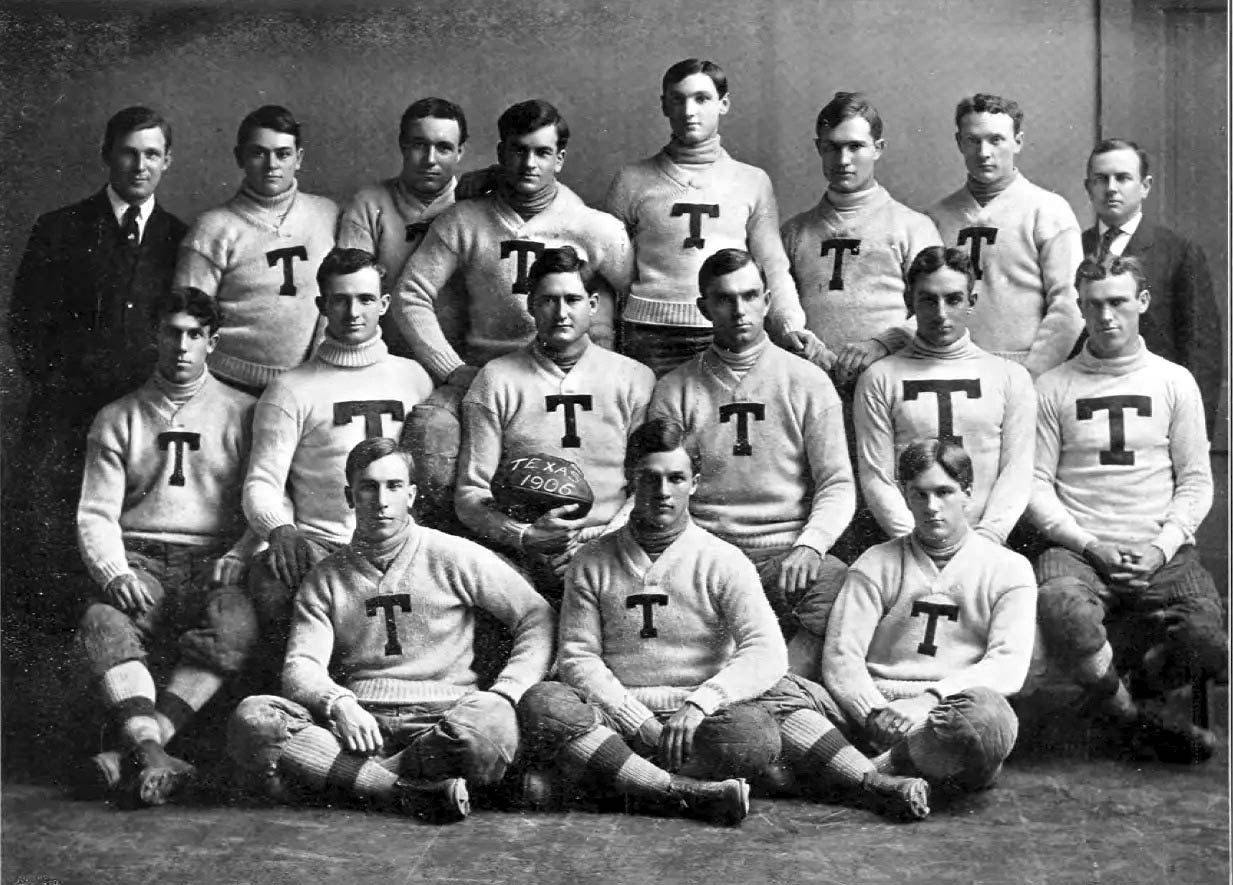
- Conference: Southwestern Intercollegiate Athletic Association
- Record: 9–1 (4–0 SWIAA)
- Head coach: H. R. Schenker (1st season)
- Captain: L. W. Parrish
- Home stadium: Clark Field

The 1906 Texas Longhorns football team was an American football team that represented the University of Texas (now known as the University of Texas at Austin) as a member of the Southwestern Intercollegiate Athletic Association (SWIAA) during the 1906 college football season. In their first and only year under head coach H. R. Schenker, the Longhorns compiled an overall record of 9–1, with a mark of 4–0 in conference play, and outscored opponents by a total of 201 to 60.

== Schedule ==
Date	Time	Opponent	Site	Result	Source
October 6		26th Infantry*	Clark Field; Austin, TX	W 21–0	
October 13		TCU*	Clark Field; Austin, TX (rivalry)	W 22–0	
October 20		West Texas Military Academy*	Clark Field; Austin, TX	W 28–0	
October 27		at Vanderbilt	Dudley Field; Nashville, TN	L 0–45	
October 30		at Arkansas*	The Hill; Fayetteville, AR (rivalry)	W 11–0	
November 2	3:30 p.m.	vs. Oklahoma*	Sportsman's Park; Oklahoma City, Oklahoma Territory (rivalry)	W 10–9	
November 9		Haskell*	Clark Field; Austin, TX	W 28–0	
November 16		Daniel Baker*	Clark Field; Austin, TX	W 40–0	
November 23		Washington University*	Clark Field; Austin, TX	W 17–6	
November 29		Texas A&M	Clark Field; Austin, TX (rivalry)	W 24–0	
*Non-conference game
