= 1906 Davidson football team =

American college football season

1906 Davidson football
- Conference: Independent
- Record: 3–2–2
- Head coach: Robert S. Graham (1st season); John Beverly Pollard
- Home stadium: Sprunt Athletic Field

1906 Southern college football independents records
	Conf.			Overall
Team	W	L	T	W		L		T
The Citadel		–		3	–	0	–	0
Kendall		–		2	–	0	–	0
Catholic University		–		1	–	0	–	0
Georgetown		–		6	–	1	–	0
Texas A&M		–		6	–	1	–	0
Delaware		–		5	–	1	–	0
Navy		–		8	–	2	–	2
Southwestern Louisiana Industrial		–		1	–	0	–	1
Stetson		–		3	–	1	–	0
Virginia		–		7	–	2	–	2
Howard (AL)		–		6	–	2	–	1
Oklahoma		–		5	–	2	–	2
VPI		–		5	–	2	–	2
Kentucky State		–		4	–	3	–	0
Davidson		–		3	–	2	–	2
Florida		–		5	–	3	–	0
Maryland		–		5	–	3	–	0
North Carolina A&M		–		3	–	1	–	4
Louisiana Industrial		–		2	–	1	–	3
West Virginia		–		5	–	5	–	0
George Washington		–		4	–	3	–	2
VMI		–		4	–	4	–	0
Grant		–		3	–	3	–	0
Arkansas		–		2	–	4	–	2
TCU		–		2	–	5	–	0
North Carolina		–		1	–	4	–	2
Oklahoma A&M		–		1	–	4	–	2
Roanoke		–		1	–	4	–	2
Rollins		–		1	–	3	–	0
Birmingham		–		0	–	2	–	1
Goldey College		–		0	–	3	–	0

The 1906 Davidson Wildcats football team represented Davidson University in the 1906 college football season. According to Fuzzy Woodruff, the team threw the first forward pass in the South.

== Schedule ==
Date	Opponent	Site	Result	Source
September 29	vs. North Carolina	Latta Park; Charlotte, NC	T 0–0	
October 6	Oak Ridge	Sprunt Athletic Field; Davidson, NC	W 10–0	
October 13	at Georgia	Herty Field; Athens, GA	W 15–0	
October 27	at Georgia Tech	Grant Field; Atlanta, GA	L 0–4	
November 3	vs. Clemson	Latta Park; Charlotte, NC	T 0–0	
November 17	at VPI	Gibboney Field; Blacksburg, VA	L 0–10	
November 24	at VMI	Lynchburg, VA	W 6–0	

== Game summaries ==
=== North Carolina ===
In the first game of the season, Davidson and the Tar Heels fought to a scoreless tie in Charlotte.

=== Georgia ===
In 1906, the Davidson football team made history. Prior to a game against Georgia, the Davidson coaching staff took note of the new rule that made a forward pass a legal play. During the game, the team completed several short passes over the middle and ended up winning 15–0. Fuzzy Woodruff gives the team credit for being the first team in the South to complete a forward pass in his book, "The History of Southern Football."

The starting lineup was Sadler (left end), Walker (left tackle), Sentz (left guard), Edgerton (center), Spicer (right guard), Allen (right tackle), Huntington (right end), Elliott (quarterback), Miller (left halfback), Denny (right halfback), McKay (fullback).

=== Georgia Tech ===
Lob Brown was responsible for the win over Davidson by a field goal.

=== Clemson ===
Davidson gave Clemson its third scoreless tie of the season.

=== VPI ===
VPI beat Davidson 10–0, all the scoring done in the first half.

The starting lineup was: Sadler (left end); Walker (left tackle); Lentz (left guard); Egerton (center); Whittaker (right guard); Spicer (right tackle); Huntington (right end); Elliott (quarterback); Denny (left halfback); Miller (right halfback); McCoy (fullback)
