= 1906 Stetson Hatters football team =

American college football season

1906 Stetson Hatters football
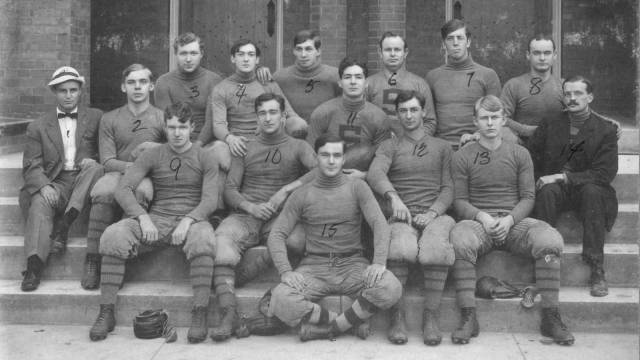

State champion
- Conference: Independent
- Record: 3–1
- Head coach: Litchfield Colton (3rd season)

1906 Southern college football independents records
	Conf.			Overall
Team	W	L	T	W		L		T
The Citadel		–		3	–	0	–	0
Kendall		–		2	–	0	–	0
Catholic University		–		1	–	0	–	0
Georgetown		–		6	–	1	–	0
Texas A&M		–		6	–	1	–	0
Delaware		–		5	–	1	–	0
Navy		–		8	–	2	–	2
Southwestern Louisiana Industrial		–		1	–	0	–	1
Stetson		–		3	–	1	–	0
Virginia		–		7	–	2	–	2
Howard (AL)		–		6	–	2	–	1
Oklahoma		–		5	–	2	–	2
VPI		–		5	–	2	–	2
Kentucky State		–		4	–	3	–	0
Davidson		–		3	–	2	–	2
Florida		–		5	–	3	–	0
North Carolina A&M		–		3	–	1	–	4
Louisiana Industrial		–		2	–	1	–	3
West Virginia		–		5	–	5	–	0
George Washington		–		4	–	3	–	2
VMI		–		4	–	4	–	0
Grant		–		3	–	3	–	0
Arkansas		–		2	–	4	–	2
TCU		–		2	–	5	–	0
North Carolina		–		1	–	4	–	2
Oklahoma A&M		–		1	–	4	–	2
Roanoke		–		1	–	4	–	2
Rollins		–		1	–	3	–	0
Birmingham		–		0	–	2	–	1
Goldey College		–		0	–	3	–	0

The 1906 Stetson Hatters football team represented the private Stetson College in the sport of American football during the 1906 college football season.

== Schedule ==
Date	Opponent	Site	Result
October 26	Fort Dade Army	Deland, FL	W 53–0
November 6	Rollins	Winter Park, FL	W 15–0
November 13	Savannah Athletic Club	Savannah, GA	L 0–39
November 29	Rollins	Deland, FL	W 2–0
