= 1906 North Carolina Tar Heels football team =

American college football season

1906 North Carolina Tar Heels football
- Conference: Independent
- Record: 1–4–2
- Head coach: Willis Kienholz (1st season)
- Captain: Foy Roberson
- Home stadium: Campus Athletic Field (II)

1906 Southern college football independents records
	Conf.			Overall
Team	W	L	T	W		L		T
The Citadel		–		3	–	0	–	0
Kendall		–		2	–	0	–	0
Catholic University		–		1	–	0	–	0
Georgetown		–		6	–	1	–	0
Texas A&M		–		6	–	1	–	0
Delaware		–		5	–	1	–	0
Navy		–		8	–	2	–	2
Southwestern Louisiana Industrial		–		1	–	0	–	1
Stetson		–		3	–	1	–	0
Virginia		–		7	–	2	–	2
Howard (AL)		–		6	–	2	–	1
Oklahoma		–		5	–	2	–	2
VPI		–		5	–	2	–	2
Kentucky State		–		4	–	3	–	0
Davidson		–		3	–	2	–	2
Florida		–		5	–	3	–	0
North Carolina A&M		–		3	–	1	–	4
Louisiana Industrial		–		2	–	1	–	3
West Virginia		–		5	–	5	–	0
George Washington		–		4	–	3	–	2
VMI		–		4	–	4	–	0
Grant		–		3	–	3	–	0
Arkansas		–		2	–	4	–	2
TCU		–		2	–	5	–	0
North Carolina		–		1	–	4	–	2
Oklahoma A&M		–		1	–	4	–	2
Roanoke		–		1	–	4	–	2
Rollins		–		1	–	3	–	0
Birmingham		–		0	–	2	–	1
Goldey College		–		0	–	3	–	0

The 1906 North Carolina Tar Heels football team represented the University of North Carolina in the 1906 college football season. The team captain of the 1906 season was Foy Roberson.

== Schedule ==
Date	Time	Opponent	Site	Result	Attendance	Source
September 29	3:30 p.m.	vs. Davidson	Latta Park; Charlotte, NC	T 0–0	1,200	
October 6	3:00 p.m.	at Penn	Franklin Field; Philadelphia, PA	L 0–11		
October 12	3:25 p.m.	Richmond	Campus Athletic Field (II); Chapel Hill, NC	W 12–0		
October 20		vs. Lafayette	Lafayette Field; Norfolk, VA	L 6–28		
October 27	3:00 p.m.	vs. VPI	Broad Street Park (I); Richmond, VA	T 0–0	4,000	
November 3		vs. Georgetown	Lafayette Field; Norfolk, VA	L 0–4	2,000	
November 17		at Navy	Worden Field; Annapolis, MD	L 0–40		
