= 1906 Howard Crimson and Blue football team =

American college football season

1906 Howard Crimson and Blue football
- Conference: Independent
- Record: 6–2–1
- Head coach: John Counselman (1st season)
- Home stadium: West End Park; Alabama State Fairgrounds

1906 Southern college football independents records
| | Conf. | | | Overall |
| Team | W | L | T | W | | L | | T |
|---|---|---|---|---|---|---|---|---|
| The Citadel | | – | | 3 | – | 0 | – | 0 |
| Kendall | | – | | 2 | – | 0 | – | 0 |
| Catholic University | | – | | 1 | – | 0 | – | 0 |
| Georgetown | | – | | 6 | – | 1 | – | 0 |
| Texas A&M | | – | | 6 | – | 1 | – | 0 |
| Delaware | | – | | 5 | – | 1 | – | 0 |
| Navy | | – | | 8 | – | 2 | – | 2 |
| Southwestern Louisiana Industrial | | – | | 1 | – | 0 | – | 1 |
| Stetson | | – | | 3 | – | 1 | – | 0 |
| Virginia | | – | | 7 | – | 2 | – | 2 |
| Howard (AL) | | – | | 6 | – | 2 | – | 1 |
| Oklahoma | | – | | 5 | – | 2 | – | 2 |
| VPI | | – | | 5 | – | 2 | – | 2 |
| Kentucky State | | – | | 4 | – | 3 | – | 0 |
| Davidson | | – | | 3 | – | 2 | – | 2 |
| Florida | | – | | 5 | – | 3 | – | 0 |
| North Carolina A&M | | – | | 3 | – | 1 | – | 4 |
| Louisiana Industrial | | – | | 2 | – | 1 | – | 3 |
| West Virginia | | – | | 5 | – | 5 | – | 0 |
| George Washington | | – | | 4 | – | 3 | – | 2 |
| VMI | | – | | 4 | – | 4 | – | 0 |
| Grant | | – | | 3 | – | 3 | – | 0 |
| Arkansas | | – | | 2 | – | 4 | – | 2 |
| TCU | | – | | 2 | – | 5 | – | 0 |
| North Carolina | | – | | 1 | – | 4 | – | 2 |
| Oklahoma A&M | | – | | 1 | – | 4 | – | 2 |
| Roanoke | | – | | 1 | – | 4 | – | 2 |
| Rollins | | – | | 1 | – | 3 | – | 0 |
| Birmingham | | – | | 0 | – | 2 | – | 1 |
| Goldey College | | – | | 0 | – | 3 | – | 0 |

The 1906 Howard Crimson and Blue football team was an American football team that represented Howard College (now known as the Samford University) as an independent during the 1906 college football season. In their first year under head coach John Counselman, the team compiled an 6–2–1 record.

== Schedule ==
| Date | Opponent | Site | Result | Source |
|---|---|---|---|---|
| September 29 | at Mississippi A&M | Hardy Field; Starkville, MS | L 0–30 | |
| October 13 | at Alabama | The Quad; Tuscaloosa, AL | L 0–14 | |
| October 23 | vs. Birmingham | West End Park; Birmingham, AL | W 51–0 | |
| October 27 | at Tulane | Athletic Park; New Orleans, LA | T 0–0 | |
| November 3 | Grant | West End Park; Birmingham, AL | W 63–0 | |
| November 9 | at Alabama Presbyterian | Anniston, AL | W 5–0 | |
| November 10 | Southwestern Presbyterian | West End Park; Birmingham, AL | W 12–6 | |
| November 24 | Ensley All-Collegians | Alabama State Fairgrounds; Birmingham, AL | W 22–0 | |
| November 29 | at Marion | Marion, AL | W 48–0 | |
