= 1906 Arkansas Cardinals football team =

American college football season

1906 Arkansas Cardinals football
- Conference: Independent
- Record: 2–4–2
- Head coach: Frank Longman (1st season)
- Captain: John Shirley Wood
- Home stadium: The Hill

1906 Southern college football independents records
	Conf.			Overall
Team	W	L	T	W		L		T
The Citadel		–		3	–	0	–	0
Kendall		–		2	–	0	–	0
Catholic University		–		1	–	0	–	0
Georgetown		–		6	–	1	–	0
Texas A&M		–		6	–	1	–	0
Delaware		–		5	–	1	–	0
Navy		–		8	–	2	–	2
Southwestern Louisiana Industrial		–		1	–	0	–	1
Stetson		–		3	–	1	–	0
Virginia		–		7	–	2	–	2
Howard (AL)		–		6	–	2	–	1
Oklahoma		–		5	–	2	–	2
VPI		–		5	–	2	–	2
Kentucky State		–		4	–	3	–	0
Davidson		–		3	–	2	–	2
Florida		–		5	–	3	–	0
North Carolina A&M		–		3	–	1	–	4
Louisiana Industrial		–		2	–	1	–	3
West Virginia		–		5	–	5	–	0
George Washington		–		4	–	3	–	2
VMI		–		4	–	4	–	0
Grant		–		3	–	3	–	0
Arkansas		–		2	–	4	–	2
TCU		–		2	–	5	–	0
North Carolina		–		1	–	4	–	2
Oklahoma A&M		–		1	–	4	–	2
Roanoke		–		1	–	4	–	2
Rollins		–		1	–	3	–	0
Birmingham		–		0	–	2	–	1
Goldey College		–		0	–	3	–	0

The 1906 Arkansas Cardinals football team represented the University of Arkansas during the 1906 college football season. The Razorbacks compiled a 2–4–2 record and were outscored by their opponents by a combined total of 70 to 45.

In January 1906, Arkansas hired Frank Longman, who had played at the fullback position under Fielding H. Yost at Michigan, as the football coach. Longman remained the football coach at Arkansas for two years before moving on to Notre Dame where he led the Fighting Irish to an 11–1–2 record during the 1909 and 1910 seasons.

== Schedule ==
Date	Time	Opponent	Site	Result	Source
September 29		Chilocco	The Hill; Fayetteville, AR	L 0–5	
October 6		vs. Cape Girardeau Normal	Hot Springs, AR	W 12–0	
October 8		Drury	The Hill; Fayetteville, AR	T 0–0	
October 13		at Kansas	McCook Field; Lawrence, KS	L 5–37	
October 30		Texas	The Hill; Fayetteville, AR (rivalry)	L 0–11	
November 10		at Missouri	Rollins Field; Columbia, MO (rivalry)	L 0–11	
November 24		at Tulane	Athletic Park; New Orleans, LA	W 22–0	
November 29	3:30 p.m.	at LSU	State Field; Baton Rouge, LA (rivalry)	T 6–6	
