= 1906 VPI football team =

American college football season

1906 VPI football
- Conference: Independent
- Record: 5–2–2
- Head coach: Sally Miles (2nd season)
- Captain: James A. Nutter
- Home stadium: Gibboney Field

1906 Southern college football independents records
| | Conf. | | | Overall |
| Team | W | L | T | W | | L | | T |
|---|---|---|---|---|---|---|---|---|
| The Citadel | | – | | 3 | – | 0 | – | 0 |
| Kendall | | – | | 2 | – | 0 | – | 0 |
| Catholic University | | – | | 1 | – | 0 | – | 0 |
| Georgetown | | – | | 6 | – | 1 | – | 0 |
| Texas A&M | | – | | 6 | – | 1 | – | 0 |
| Delaware | | – | | 5 | – | 1 | – | 0 |
| Navy | | – | | 8 | – | 2 | – | 2 |
| Southwestern Louisiana Industrial | | – | | 1 | – | 0 | – | 1 |
| Stetson | | – | | 3 | – | 1 | – | 0 |
| Virginia | | – | | 7 | – | 2 | – | 2 |
| Howard (AL) | | – | | 6 | – | 2 | – | 1 |
| Oklahoma | | – | | 5 | – | 2 | – | 2 |
| VPI | | – | | 5 | – | 2 | – | 2 |
| Kentucky State | | – | | 4 | – | 3 | – | 0 |
| Davidson | | – | | 3 | – | 2 | – | 2 |
| Florida | | – | | 5 | – | 3 | – | 0 |
| North Carolina A&M | | – | | 3 | – | 1 | – | 4 |
| Louisiana Industrial | | – | | 2 | – | 1 | – | 3 |
| West Virginia | | – | | 5 | – | 5 | – | 0 |
| George Washington | | – | | 4 | – | 3 | – | 2 |
| VMI | | – | | 4 | – | 4 | – | 0 |
| Grant | | – | | 3 | – | 3 | – | 0 |
| Arkansas | | – | | 2 | – | 4 | – | 2 |
| TCU | | – | | 2 | – | 5 | – | 0 |
| North Carolina | | – | | 1 | – | 4 | – | 2 |
| Oklahoma A&M | | – | | 1 | – | 4 | – | 2 |
| Roanoke | | – | | 1 | – | 4 | – | 2 |
| Rollins | | – | | 1 | – | 3 | – | 0 |
| Birmingham | | – | | 0 | – | 2 | – | 1 |
| Goldey College | | – | | 0 | – | 3 | – | 0 |

The 1906 VPI football team represented Virginia Agricultural and Mechanical College and Polytechnic Institute in the 1906 college football season. The team was led by their head coach Sally Miles and finished with a record of five wins, two losses, and two ties (5–2–2).

== Schedule ==
| Date | Time | Opponent | Site | Result | Attendance | Source |
|---|---|---|---|---|---|---|
| October 6 | | vs. William & Mary | Fair Grounds; Roanoke, VA | W 12–0 | 450 | |
| October 8 | | William & Mary | Gibboney Field; Blacksburg, VA | W 28–0 | | |
| October 13 | | at Clemson | Bowman Field; Calhoun, SC | T 0–0 | | |
| October 27 | 3:00 p.m. | vs. North Carolina | Broad Street Park; Richmond, VA | T 0–0 | 4,000 | |
| November 3 | | Roanoke | Gibboney Field; Blacksburg, VA | W 18–0 | | |
| November 10 | 3:00 p.m. | vs. Bucknell | Lafayette Field; Norfolk, VA | L 0–10 | | |
| November 17 | 2:30 p.m. | Davidson | Gibboney Field; Blacksburg, VA | W 10–0 | | |
| November 24 | | at Navy | Worden Field; Annapolis, MD | L 0–5 | | |
| November 29 | | vs. North Carolina A&M | Broad Street Park; Richmond, VA | W 6–0 | 10,000 | |

== Before the season ==
The 1905 VPI football team compiled a 9–1 record and were led by Sally Miles in his first season as head coach.

== Game summaries ==
=== William & Mary (first game) ===
VPI's first game of the season was a victory over William & Mary at the Fair Grounds in Roanoke, Virginia.

The starting lineup for VPI was: Grant (left end), Diffendal (left tackle), Cunningham (left guard), Johnson (center), Bonner (right guard), Garnett (right tackle), Worthington (right end), Montague (quarterback), Nutter (left halfback), Hodgson (right halfback), Smith (fullback).

The starting lineup for William & Mary was: Dade (left end), George Hankins (left tackle), James Kirkmyer (left guard), C. Hall (center), G. A. B. Dovell (right guard), Robert Strong (right tackle), Grant (right end), G. A. Dovell (quarterback), Somers (left halfback), George Ferguson (right halfback), Henry Carter (fullback).

=== North Carolina ===
North Carolina vs. VPI

| Team | 1 | 2 | Total |
|---|---|---|---|
| UNC | 0 | 0 | 0 |
| VPI | 0 | 0 | 0 |

- Date: October 27, 1906
- Location: Broad Street Park
  Richmond, VA
- Game start: 3:00 p.m.
- Game attendance: 4,000
- Referee: Joel Whitaker

The starting lineup for VPI was: Grant (left end), Diffendal (left tackle), Cunningham (left guard), Johnson (center), Garnett (right guard), Branch (right tackle), Worthington (right end), Treadwell (quarterback), Nutter (left halfback), Bouman (right halfback), Smith (fullback). The substitutes were: Hodgson.

The starting lineup for North Carolina was: James Davis (left end), Snowden Singletary (left tackle), Earle Thompson (left guard), George Rogers (center), James Morrow (right guard), John Thompson (right tackle), Wiley Pittman (right end), Joseph Mann (quarterback), Thomas McNeill (left halfback), Lucius Dunlap (right halfback), Romy Story (fullback).

=== Roanoke ===
The starting lineup for VPI was: Noland (left end), Kirk (left tackle), Cunningham (left guard), Johnson (center), Goodwin (right guard), Branch (right tackle), Varner (right end), E. M. Wilson (quarterback), Diffendal (left halfback), Nutter (right halfback), Smith (fullback). The substitutes were: Bahen and Lawson.

The starting lineup for Roanoke was: J. J. Fray (left end), Arthur Stair (left tackle), W. Engleby (left guard), B. C. Sayers (center), J. F. Morton (right guard), Harvey Compher (right tackle), J. B. Taney (right end), John Link (quarterback), Frank Hansbarger (left halfback), M. D. Bowers (right halfback), R. M. Killey (fullback).

=== Bucknell ===
Bucknell vs. VPI

| Team | 1 | 2 | Total |
|---|---|---|---|
| • Bucknell | 4 | 6 | 10 |
| VPI | 0 | 0 | 0 |

- Date: November 10, 1906
- Location: Lafayette Field
  Norfolk, VA
- Game start: 3:00 p.m.
- Referee: Billy Suter

The starting lineup for VPI was: Noland (left end), Diffendal (left tackle), Cunningham (left guard), Johnson (center), Goodwin (right guard), Branch (right tackle), Varner (right end), Wilson (quarterback), Luttrell (left halfback), Nutter (right halfback), Smith (fullback). The substitutes were: Hodgson.

The starting lineup for Bucknell was: Ralph Winegardner (left end), Marion Sayre (left tackle), William Hawk (left guard), Charles O'Brien (center), Percy Shade (right guard), Girton Lenhart (right tackle), James Hayes (right end), Chester Niple (quarterback), Arthur McNinch (left halfback), Charles Baldwin (right halfback), Clark (fullback).

=== Davidson ===
Davidson vs. VPI

| Team | 1 | 2 | Total |
|---|---|---|---|
| Davidson | 0 | 0 | 0 |
| • VPI | 10 | 0 | 10 |

- Date: November 17, 1906
- Location: Gibboney Field
  Blacksburg, VA
- Game start: 2:30 p.m.
- Referee: Baird (Radford)

The VPI-Davidson game was originally scheduled to be played in Roanoke, Virginia, but was moved to Lynchburg, Virginia at the request of VPI. However, the game was eventually played in Blacksburg.

The starting lineup for VPI was: Worthington (left end), Diffendal (left tackle), Cunningham (left guard), Johnson (center), Goodwin (right guard), Branch (right tackle), Varner (right end), Wilson (quarterback), Luttrell (left halfback), Nutter (right halfback), Smith (fullback).

The starting lineup for Davidson was: Sadler (left end), John Walker (left tackle), Lentz (left guard), Norman B. Edgerton (center), Whitaker (right guard), Spicer (right tackle), J. Benedict Huntington (right end), Elliott (quarterback), Robert Denny (left halfback), George Miller (right halfback), McCoy (fullback).

=== Navy ===
VPI at Navy

| Team | 1 | 2 | Total |
|---|---|---|---|
| VPI | 0 | 0 | 0 |
| • Navy | 5 | 0 | 5 |

- Date: November 24, 1906
- Location: Worden Field
  Annapolis, MD
- Referee: Gresham Poe

The starting lineup for VPI was: Worthington (left end), Diffendal (left tackle), Cunningham (left guard), Johnson (center), Goodwin (right guard), Branch (right tackle), Varner (right end), Wilson (quarterback), Hodgson (left halfback), Nutter (right halfback), Smith (fullback). The substitutes were: Stiles.

The starting lineup for Navy was: Richard Bernard (left end), Percy Northcroft (left tackle), George Meyer (left guard), Frank Slingluff Jr. (center), Percy Wright (right guard), William Piersol (right tackle), Bill Dague (right end), Homer Norton (quarterback), A. H. Douglas (left halfback), Herbert Spencer (right halfback), Jonas H. Ingram (fullback). The substitutes were: Harold Boynton, Harris, Frank Leighton and Cary Magruder.

=== North Carolina A&M ===
North Carolina A&M vs. VPI

| Team | 1 | 2 | Total |
|---|---|---|---|
| NC A&M | 0 | 0 | 0 |
| • VPI | 0 | 6 | 6 |

- Date: November 29, 1906
- Location: Broad Street Park
  Richmond, VA
- Game attendance: 10,000

The starting lineup for VPI was: Worthington (left end), Diffendal (left tackle), Cunningham (left guard), Johnson (center), Goodwin (right guard), Branch (right tackle), Varner (right end), Wilson (quarterback), Hodgson (left halfback), Nutter (right halfback), Smith (fullback). The substitutes were: Treadwell.

The starting lineup for North Carolina A&M was: Edwards (left end), Strayer (left tackle), Perkins (left guard), W. T. Temple (center), Vance Sykes (right guard), H. Beebe (right tackle), Samuel Stephens (right end), Eskridge (quarterback), Frank Thompson (left halfback), Arthur Wilson (right halfback), John Shuford (fullback). The substitutes were: A. E. Abernethy and L. C. Drake.

== Players ==
The following players were members of the 1906 football team according to the roster published in the 1907 edition of The Bugle, the Virginia Tech yearbook.

VPI 1906 roster
| Quarterbacks: William Triplett Montague; Eugene Munson Wilson; Guards: George Hamilton Cunningham; Meade Montgomery Goodwyn; Tackles: William Lewis Branch; Charles Edward Diffendal; Center: Allen Burnley Johnson | Ends: Harry Varner; Gustave Tucker Worthington; Halfbacks: Herbert David Hodgson; James A. Nutter (Capt.); Fullback: Russell Wilmer Smith | Substitutes: Joseph Bernard Bahen; Albert Roy Bauman; Bonner; Garnett; Grant; John Russell Kirk; Ewing Waters Lawson; Joseph Talmage Luttrell; Philip Haxall Noland; Herbert Newton Stiles; Treadwell |

== Coaching and training staff ==
- Head coach: Sally Miles
- Manager: Charles Buchanan Powell
- Assistant manager: Robert Pilson Albert Johnson
