= 1906 Louisiana Industrial football team =

American college football season

1906 Louisiana Industrial football
- Conference: Independent
- Record: 2–1–3
- Head coach: Zack T. Young (1st season)
- Captain: H. T. Hair

1906 Southern college football independents records
	Conf.			Overall
Team	W	L	T	W		L		T
The Citadel		–		3	–	0	–	0
Kendall		–		2	–	0	–	0
Catholic University		–		1	–	0	–	0
Georgetown		–		6	–	1	–	0
Texas A&M		–		6	–	1	–	0
Delaware		–		5	–	1	–	0
Navy		–		8	–	2	–	2
Southwestern Louisiana Industrial		–		1	–	0	–	1
Stetson		–		3	–	1	–	0
Virginia		–		7	–	2	–	2
Howard (AL)		–		6	–	2	–	1
Oklahoma		–		5	–	2	–	2
VPI		–		5	–	2	–	2
Kentucky State		–		4	–	3	–	0
Davidson		–		3	–	2	–	2
Florida		–		5	–	3	–	0
North Carolina A&M		–		3	–	1	–	4
Louisiana Industrial		–		2	–	1	–	3
West Virginia		–		5	–	5	–	0
George Washington		–		4	–	3	–	2
VMI		–		4	–	4	–	0
Grant		–		3	–	3	–	0
Arkansas		–		2	–	4	–	2
TCU		–		2	–	5	–	0
North Carolina		–		1	–	4	–	2
Oklahoma A&M		–		1	–	4	–	2
Roanoke		–		1	–	4	–	2
Rollins		–		1	–	3	–	0
Birmingham		–		0	–	2	–	1
Goldey College		–		0	–	3	–	0

The 1906 Louisiana Industrial football team was an American football team that represented the Louisiana Industrial Institute—now known as Louisiana Tech University—as an independent during the 1906 college football season. In their first and only season under head coach Zack T. Young, Louisiana Industrial compiled a record of 2–1–3. The team's captain was H. T. Hair.

== Schedule ==
Date	Opponent	Site	Result	Source
October 22	at Monroe Athletic Club	Monroe, LA	T 0–0	
November 3	Ouachita Baptist	Ruston, LA	W 5–0	
November 9	at LSU	State Field; Baton Rouge, LA	L 0–17	
	Ruston Athletic Club	Ruston, LA	W 26–0	
November 29	at Henderson	Arkadelphia, AR	T 5–5	
	Shreveport YMCA	Ruston, LA	T 0–0	
