= 1906 Goldey College football team =

American college football season

1906 Goldey College football
- Conference: Independent
- Record: 0–3
- Head coach: Unknown

1906 Southern college football independents records
	Conf.			Overall
Team	W	L	T	W		L		T
The Citadel		–		3	–	0	–	0
Kendall		–		2	–	0	–	0
Catholic University		–		1	–	0	–	0
Georgetown		–		6	–	1	–	0
Texas A&M		–		6	–	1	–	0
Delaware		–		5	–	1	–	0
Navy		–		8	–	2	–	2
Southwestern Louisiana Industrial		–		1	–	0	–	1
Stetson		–		3	–	1	–	0
Virginia		–		7	–	2	–	2
Howard (AL)		–		6	–	2	–	1
Oklahoma		–		5	–	2	–	2
VPI		–		5	–	2	–	2
Kentucky State		–		4	–	3	–	0
Davidson		–		3	–	2	–	2
Florida		–		5	–	3	–	0
North Carolina A&M		–		3	–	1	–	4
Louisiana Industrial		–		2	–	1	–	3
West Virginia		–		5	–	5	–	0
George Washington		–		4	–	3	–	2
VMI		–		4	–	4	–	0
Grant		–		3	–	3	–	0
Arkansas		–		2	–	4	–	2
TCU		–		2	–	5	–	0
North Carolina		–		1	–	4	–	2
Oklahoma A&M		–		1	–	4	–	2
Roanoke		–		1	–	4	–	2
Rollins		–		1	–	3	–	0
Birmingham		–		0	–	2	–	1
Goldey College		–		0	–	3	–	0

The 1906 Goldey College football team represented Goldey College (now known as Goldey–Beacom College) in the 1906 college football season as an independent. In three games played, Goldey went winless, being outscored 0–38 in contests against Wilmington High School, the Delaware Reserves, and the Washington Reserves.

== Schedule ==
Date	Time	Opponent	Site	Result	Source
October 13		Wilmington Conference Academy	Dover, DE	Cancelled	
October 23	3:30 p.m.	Wilmington High School	Union Street Gridiron	L 0–10	
c. October 28		Delaware reserves		L 0–23	
November 10		at Washington College reserves	Chestertown, MD	L 0–5	
