= 1906 Navy Midshipmen football team =

American college football season

1906 Navy Midshipmen football
- Conference: Independent
- Record: 8–2–2
- Head coach: Paul Dashiell (3rd season)
- Captain: Herbert Spencer
- Home stadium: Worden Field

1906 Southern college football independents records
	Conf.			Overall
Team	W	L	T	W		L		T
The Citadel		–		3	–	0	–	0
Kendall		–		2	–	0	–	0
Catholic University		–		1	–	0	–	0
Georgetown		–		6	–	1	–	0
Texas A&M		–		6	–	1	–	0
Delaware		–		5	–	1	–	0
Navy		–		8	–	2	–	2
Southwestern Louisiana Industrial		–		1	–	0	–	1
Stetson		–		3	–	1	–	0
Virginia		–		7	–	2	–	2
Howard (AL)		–		6	–	2	–	1
Oklahoma		–		5	–	2	–	2
VPI		–		5	–	2	–	2
Kentucky State		–		4	–	3	–	0
Davidson		–		3	–	2	–	2
Florida		–		5	–	3	–	0
Maryland		–		5	–	3	–	0
North Carolina A&M		–		3	–	1	–	4
Louisiana Industrial		–		2	–	1	–	3
West Virginia		–		5	–	5	–	0
George Washington		–		4	–	3	–	2
VMI		–		4	–	4	–	0
Grant		–		3	–	3	–	0
Arkansas		–		2	–	4	–	2
TCU		–		2	–	5	–	0
North Carolina		–		1	–	4	–	2
Oklahoma A&M		–		1	–	4	–	2
Roanoke		–		1	–	4	–	2
Rollins		–		1	–	3	–	0
Birmingham		–		0	–	2	–	1
Goldey College		–		0	–	3	–	0

The 1906 Navy Midshipmen football team represented the United States Naval Academy during the 1906 college football season. In their third season under Paul Dashiell, the Midshipmen compiled an 8–2–2 record, shut out nine opponents (including a scoreless tie with Bucknell), and outscored all opponents by a combined score of 149 to 14.

== Schedule ==
Date	Opponent	Site	Result	Attendance	Source
October 6	Dickinson	Worden Field; Annapolis, MD	T 0–0		
October 10	Maryland Agricultural	Worden Field; Annapolis, MD (rivalry)	W 12–0		
October 13	Princeton	Worden Field; Annapolis, MD	L 0–5		
October 17	St. John's (MD)	Worden Field; Annapolis, MD	W 34–0		
October 20	Lehigh	Worden Field; Annapolis, MD	W 12–0		
October 24	Western Maryland	Worden Field; Annapolis, MD	W 31–0		
October 27	Bucknell	Worden Field; Annapolis, MD	T 0–0		
November 3	Penn State	Worden Field; Annapolis, MD	L 0–5	5,000	
November 10	Swarthmore	Worden Field; Annapolis, MD	W 5–4		
November 17	North Carolina	Worden Field; Annapolis, MD	W 40–0		
November 24	VPI	Worden Field; Annapolis, MD	W 5–0		
December 1	vs. Army	Franklin Field; Philadelphia, PA (Army–Navy Game)	W 10–0		
