= 1906 Georgetown Blue and Gray football team =

American college football season

1906 Georgetown Blue and Gray football
- Conference: Independent
- Record: 6–1
- Head coach: Joe Reilly (3rd season)
- Captain: Branch Bocock
- Home stadium: Georgetown Field

1906 Southern college football independents records
	Conf.			Overall
Team	W	L	T	W		L		T
The Citadel		–		3	–	0	–	0
Kendall		–		2	–	0	–	0
Catholic University		–		1	–	0	–	0
Georgetown		–		6	–	1	–	0
Texas A&M		–		6	–	1	–	0
Delaware		–		5	–	1	–	0
Navy		–		8	–	2	–	2
Southwestern Louisiana Industrial		–		1	–	0	–	1
Stetson		–		3	–	1	–	0
Virginia		–		7	–	2	–	2
Howard (AL)		–		6	–	2	–	1
Oklahoma		–		5	–	2	–	2
VPI		–		5	–	2	–	2
Kentucky State		–		4	–	3	–	0
Davidson		–		3	–	2	–	2
Florida		–		5	–	3	–	0
Maryland		–		5	–	3	–	0
North Carolina A&M		–		3	–	1	–	4
Louisiana Industrial		–		2	–	1	–	3
West Virginia		–		5	–	5	–	0
George Washington		–		4	–	3	–	2
VMI		–		4	–	4	–	0
Grant		–		3	–	3	–	0
Arkansas		–		2	–	4	–	2
TCU		–		2	–	5	–	0
North Carolina		–		1	–	4	–	2
Oklahoma A&M		–		1	–	4	–	2
Roanoke		–		1	–	4	–	2
Rollins		–		1	–	3	–	0
Birmingham		–		0	–	2	–	1
Goldey College		–		0	–	3	–	0

The 1906 Georgetown Blue and Gray football team represented Georgetown University during the 1906 college football season. Led by Joe Reilly in his third year as head coach, the team went 6–1. Branch Bocock was the team's quarterback.

== Schedule ==
Date	Opponent	Site	Result	Attendance	Source
October 6	Gallaudet	Georgetown Field; Washington, DC	W 22–0		
October 13	Maryland	Georgetown Field; Washington, DC	W 28–0		
October 20	Mount St. Mary's	Georgetown Field; Washington, DC	W 16–0		
October 27	Washington and Lee	Georgetown Field; Washington, DC	W 6–5		
November 3	vs. North Carolina	Lafayette Field; Norfolk, VA	W 4–0		
November 10	Virginia	Georgetown Field; Washington, DC	L 0–12	4,000	
November 29	George Washington	Georgetown Field; Washington, DC	W 16–6	7,500	
