= 1906 West Virginia Mountaineers football team =

American college football season

1906 West Virginia Mountaineers football
- Conference: Independent
- Record: 5–5
- Head coach: Carl Forkum (2nd season)
- Captain: Thomas Leahy

1906 Southern college football independents records
	Conf.			Overall
Team	W	L	T	W		L		T
The Citadel		–		3	–	0	–	0
Kendall		–		2	–	0	–	0
Catholic University		–		1	–	0	–	0
Georgetown		–		6	–	1	–	0
Texas A&M		–		6	–	1	–	0
Delaware		–		5	–	1	–	0
Navy		–		8	–	2	–	2
Southwestern Louisiana Industrial		–		1	–	0	–	1
Stetson		–		3	–	1	–	0
Virginia		–		7	–	2	–	2
Howard (AL)		–		6	–	2	–	1
Oklahoma		–		5	–	2	–	2
VPI		–		5	–	2	–	2
Kentucky State		–		4	–	3	–	0
Davidson		–		3	–	2	–	2
Florida		–		5	–	3	–	0
North Carolina A&M		–		3	–	1	–	4
Louisiana Industrial		–		2	–	1	–	3
West Virginia		–		5	–	5	–	0
George Washington		–		4	–	3	–	2
VMI		–		4	–	4	–	0
Grant		–		3	–	3	–	0
Arkansas		–		2	–	4	–	2
TCU		–		2	–	5	–	0
North Carolina		–		1	–	4	–	2
Oklahoma A&M		–		1	–	4	–	2
Roanoke		–		1	–	4	–	2
Rollins		–		1	–	3	–	0
Birmingham		–		0	–	2	–	1
Goldey College		–		0	–	3	–	0

The 1906 West Virginia Mountaineers football team was an American football team that represented West Virginia University as an independent during the 1906 college football season. In its second and final season under head coach Carl Forkum, the team compiled a 5–5 record and outscored opponents by a total of 192 to 74. Thomas Leahy was the team captain.

== Schedule ==
Date	Opponent	Site	Result	Attendance	Source
September 29	Ohio	Morgantown, WV	L 6–9		
October 6	Connellsville Independents	Morgantown, WV	W 37–0		
October 13	California YMCA (PA)	Morgantown, WV	W 11–0		
October 18	at Marietta	Marietta, OH	L 2–4		
October 27	Grove City	Morgantown, WV	W 25–0		
November 3	Carnegie Tech	Morgantown, WV	W 51–0		
November 10	at Western University of Pennsylvania	Exposition Park; Pittsburgh, PA (rivalry)	L 0–17	1,500	
November 17	West Virginia Wesleyan	Morgantown, WV	W 54–4		
November 23	at Penn State	State College, PA (rivalry)	L 0–11		
November 29	at Washington & Jefferson	Washington, PA	L 6–29		
