= 1906 Grant football team =

American college football season

1906 Grant football
- Conference: Independent
- Record: 3–3
- Head coach: Arthur Rueber (1st season)
- Home stadium: Olympic Park Field

1906 Southern college football independents records
| | Conf. | | | Overall |
| Team | W | L | T | W | | L | | T |
|---|---|---|---|---|---|---|---|---|
| The Citadel | | – | | 3 | – | 0 | – | 0 |
| Kendall | | – | | 2 | – | 0 | – | 0 |
| Catholic University | | – | | 1 | – | 0 | – | 0 |
| Georgetown | | – | | 6 | – | 1 | – | 0 |
| Texas A&M | | – | | 6 | – | 1 | – | 0 |
| Delaware | | – | | 5 | – | 1 | – | 0 |
| Navy | | – | | 8 | – | 2 | – | 2 |
| Southwestern Louisiana Industrial | | – | | 1 | – | 0 | – | 1 |
| Stetson | | – | | 3 | – | 1 | – | 0 |
| Virginia | | – | | 7 | – | 2 | – | 2 |
| Howard (AL) | | – | | 6 | – | 2 | – | 1 |
| Oklahoma | | – | | 5 | – | 2 | – | 2 |
| VPI | | – | | 5 | – | 2 | – | 2 |
| Kentucky State | | – | | 4 | – | 3 | – | 0 |
| Davidson | | – | | 3 | – | 2 | – | 2 |
| Florida | | – | | 5 | – | 3 | – | 0 |
| North Carolina A&M | | – | | 3 | – | 1 | – | 4 |
| Louisiana Industrial | | – | | 2 | – | 1 | – | 3 |
| West Virginia | | – | | 5 | – | 5 | – | 0 |
| George Washington | | – | | 4 | – | 3 | – | 2 |
| VMI | | – | | 4 | – | 4 | – | 0 |
| Grant | | – | | 3 | – | 3 | – | 0 |
| Arkansas | | – | | 2 | – | 4 | – | 2 |
| TCU | | – | | 2 | – | 5 | – | 0 |
| North Carolina | | – | | 1 | – | 4 | – | 2 |
| Oklahoma A&M | | – | | 1 | – | 4 | – | 2 |
| Roanoke | | – | | 1 | – | 4 | – | 2 |
| Rollins | | – | | 1 | – | 3 | – | 0 |
| Birmingham | | – | | 0 | – | 2 | – | 1 |
| Goldey College | | – | | 0 | – | 3 | – | 0 |

The 1906 Grant football team was an American football team that represented the Chattanooga campus of U. S. Grant Memorial University (now known as the University of Tennessee at Chattanooga) during the 1906 college football season. In its first and only year under head coach Arthur Rueber, the team compiled a 3–3 record.

== Schedule ==
| Date | Opponent | Site | Result | Source |
|---|---|---|---|---|
| October 13 | at Georgia Tech | The Flats; Atlanta, GA | L 0–18 | |
| October 27 | at Mooney | Murfreesboro, TN | L 0–40 | |
| November 3 | at Howard (AL) | West End Park; Birmingham, AL | L 0–63 | |
| November 11 | 12th Cavalry | Olympic Park Field; Chattanooga, TN | W 12–0 | |
| November 23 | 12th Cavalry | Olympic Park Field; Chattanooga, TN | W 11–5 | |
| November 29 | 12th Cavalry | Olympic Park Field; Chattanooga, TN | W 23–4 | |
