= 1906 North Carolina A&M Aggies football team =

American college football season

1906 North Carolina A&M Aggies football
- Conference: Independent
- Record: 3–1–4
- Head coach: Willie Heston (1st season)

1906 Southern college football independents records
	Conf.			Overall
Team	W	L	T	W		L		T
The Citadel		–		3	–	0	–	0
Kendall		–		2	–	0	–	0
Catholic University		–		1	–	0	–	0
Georgetown		–		6	–	1	–	0
Texas A&M		–		6	–	1	–	0
Delaware		–		5	–	1	–	0
Navy		–		8	–	2	–	2
Southwestern Louisiana Industrial		–		1	–	0	–	1
Stetson		–		3	–	1	–	0
Virginia		–		7	–	2	–	2
Howard (AL)		–		6	–	2	–	1
Oklahoma		–		5	–	2	–	2
VPI		–		5	–	2	–	2
Kentucky State		–		4	–	3	–	0
Davidson		–		3	–	2	–	2
Florida		–		5	–	3	–	0
North Carolina A&M		–		3	–	1	–	4
Louisiana Industrial		–		2	–	1	–	3
West Virginia		–		5	–	5	–	0
George Washington		–		4	–	3	–	2
VMI		–		4	–	4	–	0
Grant		–		3	–	3	–	0
Arkansas		–		2	–	4	–	2
TCU		–		2	–	5	–	0
North Carolina		–		1	–	4	–	2
Oklahoma A&M		–		1	–	4	–	2
Roanoke		–		1	–	4	–	2
Rollins		–		1	–	3	–	0
Birmingham		–		0	–	2	–	1
Goldey College		–		0	–	3	–	0

The 1906 North Carolina A&M Aggies football team represented the North Carolina A&M Aggies of North Carolina College of Agriculture and Mechanic Arts (now known as North Carolina State University) during the 1906 college football season. In Willie Heston's first and only season as head coach, the Aggies compiling a record of 3–1–4, outscoring their opponents 100 to 10. The four ties are the most in program history.

== Schedule ==
Date	Time	Opponent	Site	Result	Attendance	Source
October 1		Randolph–Macon	Raleigh, NC	W 39–0		
October 6		at Virginia	Madison Hall Field; Charlottesville, VA	T 0–0		
October 11	3:30 p.m.	Richmond	New Athletic Field; Raleigh, NC	T 0–0		
October 13		at VMI	Lexington, VA	W 17–0		
October 15		at Washington and Lee	Wilson Field; Lexington, VA	T 4–4		
October 19		William & Mary	Raleigh, NC	W 44–0		
October 25		vs. Clemson	State Fairgrounds; Columbia, SC (rivalry)	T 0–0	5,000	
November 24		Roanoke	Raleigh, NC	Canceled		
November 29		vs. VPI	Broad Street Park; Richmond, VA	L 0–6	10,000	
