= 1906 Kendall Orange and Black football team =

American college football season

1906 Kendall Orange and Black football
- Conference: Independent
- Record: 2–0
- Head coach: Ben McCurtain (1st season)
- Home stadium: Benson Park

1906 Southern college football independents records
| | Conf. | | | Overall |
| Team | W | L | T | W | | L | | T |
|---|---|---|---|---|---|---|---|---|
| The Citadel | | – | | 3 | – | 0 | – | 0 |
| Kendall | | – | | 2 | – | 0 | – | 0 |
| Catholic University | | – | | 1 | – | 0 | – | 0 |
| Georgetown | | – | | 6 | – | 1 | – | 0 |
| Texas A&M | | – | | 6 | – | 1 | – | 0 |
| Delaware | | – | | 5 | – | 1 | – | 0 |
| Navy | | – | | 8 | – | 2 | – | 2 |
| Southwestern Louisiana Industrial | | – | | 1 | – | 0 | – | 1 |
| Stetson | | – | | 3 | – | 1 | – | 0 |
| Virginia | | – | | 7 | – | 2 | – | 2 |
| Howard (AL) | | – | | 6 | – | 2 | – | 1 |
| Oklahoma | | – | | 5 | – | 2 | – | 2 |
| VPI | | – | | 5 | – | 2 | – | 2 |
| Kentucky State | | – | | 4 | – | 3 | – | 0 |
| Davidson | | – | | 3 | – | 2 | – | 2 |
| Florida | | – | | 5 | – | 3 | – | 0 |
| North Carolina A&M | | – | | 3 | – | 1 | – | 4 |
| Louisiana Industrial | | – | | 2 | – | 1 | – | 3 |
| West Virginia | | – | | 5 | – | 5 | – | 0 |
| George Washington | | – | | 4 | – | 3 | – | 2 |
| VMI | | – | | 4 | – | 4 | – | 0 |
| Grant | | – | | 3 | – | 3 | – | 0 |
| Arkansas | | – | | 2 | – | 4 | – | 2 |
| TCU | | – | | 2 | – | 5 | – | 0 |
| North Carolina | | – | | 1 | – | 4 | – | 2 |
| Oklahoma A&M | | – | | 1 | – | 4 | – | 2 |
| Roanoke | | – | | 1 | – | 4 | – | 2 |
| Rollins | | – | | 1 | – | 3 | – | 0 |
| Birmingham | | – | | 0 | – | 2 | – | 1 |
| Goldey College | | – | | 0 | – | 3 | – | 0 |

The 1906 Kendall Orange and Black football team represented Henry Kendall College—now known as the University of Tulsa—as an independent during the 1906 college football season. Led by Ben McCurtain in his first and only season as head coach, the team compiled a record of 2–0.

== Schedule ==
| Date | Time | Opponent | Site | Result | Source |
|---|---|---|---|---|---|
| October 26 or 29 | 3:30 p.m. | Bacone | Benson Park; Muskogee, Indian Territory | W 9–0 | |
| November 29 | 3:00 p.m. | Claremore High School | Benson Park; Muskogee, Indian Territory | W 32–0 or 42–0 | |
