= 1906 William & Mary Orange and White football team =

American college football season

1906 William & Mary Orange and White football
- Conference: Eastern Virginia Intercollegiate Athletic Association
- Record: 2–6 (0–2 EVIAA)
- Head coach: H. W. Withers (1st season)
- Captain: G. G. Hankins

The 1906 William & Mary Orange and White football team was an American football team that represented the College of William & Mary as a member of the Eastern Virginia Intercollegiate Athletic Association (EVIAA) during the 1906 college football season. Led by H. W. Withers in his first and only season as head coach, the Orange and White compiled an overall record of 2–6. .

== Schedule ==
Date	Time	Opponent	Site	Result	Attendance	Source
October 6		vs. VPI*	Fair Grounds; Roanoke, VA	L 0–12	450	
October 8		at VPI*	Gibboney Field; Blacksburg, VA	L 0–28		
October 13		Norfolk High School*	Williamsburg, VA	W 10–0		
October 18		at North Carolina A&M*	Raleigh, NC	L 0–44		
October 27		Brambleton Business College of Norfolk*	Williamsburg, VA	W 10–0		
November 3		Richmond	Williamsburg, VA (rivalry)	L 0–24		
November 17		Randolph–Macon	Williamsburg, VA	L 4–6		
November 29	3:00 p.m.	vs. Richmond*	Casino Park; Newport News, VA	L 0–6	2,500	
*Non-conference game
