= 1906 The Citadel Bulldogs football team =

American college football season

1906 The Citadel Bulldogs football
- Conference: Independent
- Record: 3–0
- Head coach: Ralph Foster (1st season)
- Captain: James Hammond
- Home stadium: Hampton Park

1906 Southern college football independents records
	Conf.			Overall
Team	W	L	T	W		L		T
The Citadel		–		3	–	0	–	0
Kendall		–		2	–	0	–	0
Catholic University		–		1	–	0	–	0
Georgetown		–		6	–	1	–	0
Texas A&M		–		6	–	1	–	0
Delaware		–		5	–	1	–	0
Navy		–		8	–	2	–	2
Southwestern Louisiana Industrial		–		1	–	0	–	1
Stetson		–		3	–	1	–	0
Virginia		–		7	–	2	–	2
Howard (AL)		–		6	–	2	–	1
Oklahoma		–		5	–	2	–	2
VPI		–		5	–	2	–	2
Kentucky State		–		4	–	3	–	0
Davidson		–		3	–	2	–	2
Florida		–		5	–	3	–	0
North Carolina A&M		–		3	–	1	–	4
Louisiana Industrial		–		2	–	1	–	3
West Virginia		–		5	–	5	–	0
George Washington		–		4	–	3	–	2
VMI		–		4	–	4	–	0
Grant		–		3	–	3	–	0
Arkansas		–		2	–	4	–	2
TCU		–		2	–	5	–	0
North Carolina		–		1	–	4	–	2
Oklahoma A&M		–		1	–	4	–	2
Roanoke		–		1	–	4	–	2
Rollins		–		1	–	3	–	0
Birmingham		–		0	–	2	–	1
Goldey College		–		0	–	3	–	0

The 1906 The Citadel Bulldogs football team represented The Citadel as an independent during the 1906 college football season. This was the second year of intercollegiate football at The Citadel, with Ralph Foster serving as coach. The Board of Visitors would not permit the cadets to travel outside the city of Charleston for games, and all games are believed to have been played at Hampton Park at the site of the old race course. The 1906 season saw several milestones. This was the only Citadel team to finish undefeated and to shut out all of its opponents. This was also the season in which blue and white were adopted as school colors for athletic competition.

== Schedule ==
Date	Opponent	Site	Result	Source
	College of Charleston	Hampton Park; Charleston, SC	W 23–0	
November 10	Mercer	Hampton Park; Charleston, SC	W 10–0	
November 17	Porter Military Academy	Hampton Park; Charleston, SC	W 11–0	
