= 1906 Virginia Orange and Blue football team =

American college football season

1906 Virginia Orange and Blue football
- Conference: Independent
- Record: 7–2–2
- Head coach: William C. "King" Cole (2nd season)
- Captain: Hammond Johnson
- Home stadium: Madison Hall Field

1906 Southern college football independents records
	Conf.			Overall
Team	W	L	T	W		L		T
The Citadel		–		3	–	0	–	0
Kendall		–		2	–	0	–	0
Catholic University		–		1	–	0	–	0
Georgetown		–		6	–	1	–	0
Texas A&M		–		6	–	1	–	0
Delaware		–		5	–	1	–	0
Navy		–		8	–	2	–	2
Southwestern Louisiana Industrial		–		1	–	0	–	1
Stetson		–		3	–	1	–	0
Virginia		–		7	–	2	–	2
Howard (AL)		–		6	–	2	–	1
Oklahoma		–		5	–	2	–	2
VPI		–		5	–	2	–	2
Kentucky State		–		4	–	3	–	0
Davidson		–		3	–	2	–	2
Florida		–		5	–	3	–	0
Maryland		–		5	–	3	–	0
North Carolina A&M		–		3	–	1	–	4
Louisiana Industrial		–		2	–	1	–	3
West Virginia		–		5	–	5	–	0
George Washington		–		4	–	3	–	2
VMI		–		4	–	4	–	0
Grant		–		3	–	3	–	0
Arkansas		–		2	–	4	–	2
TCU		–		2	–	5	–	0
North Carolina		–		1	–	4	–	2
Oklahoma A&M		–		1	–	4	–	2
Roanoke		–		1	–	4	–	2
Rollins		–		1	–	3	–	0
Birmingham		–		0	–	2	–	1
Goldey College		–		0	–	3	–	0

The 1906 Virginia Orange and Blue football team represented the University of Virginia as an independent during the 1906 college football season. Led by William C. "King" Cole in his second and final season as head coach, the Orange and Blue compiled a record of 7–2–2.

== Schedule ==
Date	Time	Opponent	Site	Result	Attendance	Source
September 29		St. John's (MD)	Madison Hall Field; Charlottesville, VA	W 11–0		
October 3		Richmond	Madison Hall Field; Charlottesville, VA	W 22–0		
October 6		North Carolina A&M	Madison Hall Field; Charlottesville, VA	T 0–0		
October 10		Randolph–Macon	Madison Hall Field; Charlottesville, VA	W 38–0		
October 13		Hampden–Sydney	Madison Hall Field; Charlottesville, VA	W 38–5		
October 20		VMI	Madison Hall Field; Charlottesville, VA	W 4–0		
October 27		Richmond	Madison Hall Field; Charlottesville, VA	W 12–6		
November 3		vs. Bucknell	Broad Street Park; Richmond, VA	L 5–12		
November 10		at Georgetown	Georgetown Field; Washington, DC	W 12–0	4,000	
November 17		at George Washington	American League Park; Washington, DC	T 0–0	3,000	
November 29	2:30 p.m.	vs. Carlisle	Lafayette Field; Norfolk, VA	L 17–18	7,000	
