= 1906 Richmond Spiders football team =

American college football season

1906 Richmond Spiders football

EVIAA champion
- Conference: Eastern Virginia Intercollegiate Athletic Association
- Record: 6–5–1 ( EVIAA)
- Head coach: E. A. Dunlap (2nd season)
- Captain: Oscar Ludwell Bowen
- Home stadium: Broad Street Park

The 1906 Richmond Spiders football team was an American football team that represented Richmond College—now known as the University of Richmond—as a member of the Eastern Virginia Intercollegiate Athletic Association (EVIAA) during the 1906 college football season. Led by second-year head coach E. A. Dunlap, Richmond compiled a record of 6–5–1.

== Schedule ==
Date	Time	Opponent	Site	Result	Attendance	Source
September 29		Woodberry Forest	Richmond, VA	L 0–12		
October 3		at Virginia	Madison Hall Field; Charlottesville, VA	L 0–22		
October 6		Randolph–Macon	Richmond, VA	L 0–6		
October 11	3:30 p.m.	at North Carolina A&M	New Athletic Field; Raleigh, NC	T 0–0		
October 12		at North Carolina	Chapel Hill, NC	L 0–12		
October 17		Hampden–Sydney	Richmond, VA	W 1–0 (forfeit)		
October 27		at Virginia	Madison Hall Field; Charlottesville, VA	L 6–12		
November 3		at William & Mary	Williamsburg, VA (rivalry)	W 24–0		
November 10	3:30 p.m.	Roanoke	Richmond, VA	W 29–6		
November 17	3:00 p.m.	VMI	Richmond, VA (rivalry)	W 6–4		
November 24	3:00 p.m.	Randolph–Macon	Broad Street Park; Richmond, VA	W 17–0	2,000	
November 29	3:00 p.m.	vs. William & Mary	Casino Park; Newport News, VA	W 6–0	2,500	
