= 1906 Oklahoma Sooners football team =

American college football season

1906 Oklahoma Sooners football
- Conference: Independent
- Record: 5–2–2
- Head coach: Bennie Owen (2nd season)
- Captain: Jim Monnett
- Home stadium: Boyd Field

1906 Southern college football independents records
	Conf.			Overall
Team	W	L	T	W		L		T
The Citadel		–		3	–	0	–	0
Kendall		–		2	–	0	–	0
Catholic University		–		1	–	0	–	0
Georgetown		–		6	–	1	–	0
Texas A&M		–		6	–	1	–	0
Delaware		–		5	–	1	–	0
Navy		–		8	–	2	–	2
Southwestern Louisiana Industrial		–		1	–	0	–	1
Stetson		–		3	–	1	–	0
Virginia		–		7	–	2	–	2
Howard (AL)		–		6	–	2	–	1
Oklahoma		–		5	–	2	–	2
VPI		–		5	–	2	–	2
Kentucky State		–		4	–	3	–	0
Davidson		–		3	–	2	–	2
Florida		–		5	–	3	–	0
North Carolina A&M		–		3	–	1	–	4
Louisiana Industrial		–		2	–	1	–	3
West Virginia		–		5	–	5	–	0
George Washington		–		4	–	3	–	2
VMI		–		4	–	4	–	0
Grant		–		3	–	3	–	0
Arkansas		–		2	–	4	–	2
TCU		–		2	–	5	–	0
North Carolina		–		1	–	4	–	2
Oklahoma A&M		–		1	–	4	–	2
Roanoke		–		1	–	4	–	2
Rollins		–		1	–	3	–	0
Birmingham		–		0	–	2	–	1
Goldey College		–		0	–	3	–	0

The 1906 Oklahoma Sooners football team represented the University of Oklahoma as an independent during the 1906 college football season. In their second year under head coach Bennie Owen, the Sooners compiled a 5–2–2 record, and outscored their opponents by a combined total of 124 to 36. Oklahoma scheduled two games in Kansas City, Missouri, against the Kansas City Medics on October 23 and the Kansas City Athletic Club on October 27, but both games were cancelled.

== Schedule ==
Date	Time	Opponent	Site	Result	Attendance	Source
September 28		Central State Normal	Boyd Field; Norman, Oklahoma Territory	W 12–0		
October 5		Kingfisher	Boyd Field; Norman, Oklahoma Territory	W 11–6		
October 12		at Oklahoma A&M	Stillwater, Oklahoma Territory (rivalry)	W 23–0		
October 20		at Kansas	McCook Field; Lawrence, KS	L 4–20	2,000	
November 2	3:30 p.m.	vs. Texas	Sportsman's Park; Oklahoma City, Oklahoma Territory (rivalry)	L 9–10		
November 9		at Central State Normal	Edmond, Oklahoma Territory	W 17–0		
November 16		Pawahuska Town	Boyd Field; Norman, Oklahoma Territory	T 0–0		
November 23		Sulphur Town	Boyd Field; Norman, Oklahoma Territory	W 48–0		
November 29		vs. Washburn	Oklahoma City, Oklahoma Territory	T 0–0	1,000	
