= 1906 Oklahoma A&M Aggies football team =

American college football season

1906 Oklahoma A&M Aggies football
- Conference: Independent
- Record: 1–4–2
- Head coach: Boyd Hill (1st season)

1906 Southern college football independents records
	Conf.			Overall
Team	W	L	T	W		L		T
The Citadel		–		3	–	0	–	0
Kendall		–		2	–	0	–	0
Catholic University		–		1	–	0	–	0
Georgetown		–		6	–	1	–	0
Texas A&M		–		6	–	1	–	0
Delaware		–		5	–	1	–	0
Navy		–		8	–	2	–	2
Southwestern Louisiana Industrial		–		1	–	0	–	1
Stetson		–		3	–	1	–	0
Virginia		–		7	–	2	–	2
Howard (AL)		–		6	–	2	–	1
Oklahoma		–		5	–	2	–	2
VPI		–		5	–	2	–	2
Kentucky State		–		4	–	3	–	0
Davidson		–		3	–	2	–	2
Florida		–		5	–	3	–	0
North Carolina A&M		–		3	–	1	–	4
Louisiana Industrial		–		2	–	1	–	3
West Virginia		–		5	–	5	–	0
George Washington		–		4	–	3	–	2
VMI		–		4	–	4	–	0
Grant		–		3	–	3	–	0
Arkansas		–		2	–	4	–	2
TCU		–		2	–	5	–	0
North Carolina		–		1	–	4	–	2
Oklahoma A&M		–		1	–	4	–	2
Roanoke		–		1	–	4	–	2
Rollins		–		1	–	3	–	0
Birmingham		–		0	–	2	–	1
Goldey College		–		0	–	3	–	0

The 1906 Oklahoma A&M Aggies football team represented Oklahoma A&M College in the 1906 college football season. This was the sixth year of football at A&M and the first under Boyd Hill. The Aggies played their home games in Stillwater, Oklahoma Territory. They finished the season 1–4–2.

== Schedule ==
Date	Opponent	Site	Result	Attendance	Source
October 6	at Central State Normal	Edmond, Oklahoma Territory	L 2–10	800	
October 12	Oklahoma	Stillwater, Oklahoma Territory (Bedlam)	L 0–23		
October 20	Chilocco	Stillwater, Oklahoma Territory	L 5–26		
October 27	Central State Normal	Stillwater, Oklahoma Territory	L 2–23		
November 10	Epworth	Stillwater, Oklahoma Territory	T 6–6		
November 17	Tonkawa Prep	Stillwater, Oklahoma Territory	W 11–4		
November 29	Kingfisher	Stillwater, Oklahoma Territory	T 0–0		
