= 1906 Roanoke Maroons football team =

American college football season

1906 Roanoke Maroons football
- Conference: Independent
- Record: 1–4–2
- Head coach: Frank Connor (1st season)
- Home stadium: College Field

1906 Southern college football independents records
	Conf.			Overall
Team	W	L	T	W		L		T
The Citadel		–		3	–	0	–	0
Kendall		–		2	–	0	–	0
Catholic University		–		1	–	0	–	0
Georgetown		–		6	–	1	–	0
Texas A&M		–		6	–	1	–	0
Delaware		–		5	–	1	–	0
Navy		–		8	–	2	–	2
Southwestern Louisiana Industrial		–		1	–	0	–	1
Stetson		–		3	–	1	–	0
Virginia		–		7	–	2	–	2
Howard (AL)		–		6	–	2	–	1
Oklahoma		–		5	–	2	–	2
VPI		–		5	–	2	–	2
Kentucky State		–		4	–	3	–	0
Davidson		–		3	–	2	–	2
Florida		–		5	–	3	–	0
North Carolina A&M		–		3	–	1	–	4
Louisiana Industrial		–		2	–	1	–	3
West Virginia		–		5	–	5	–	0
George Washington		–		4	–	3	–	2
VMI		–		4	–	4	–	0
Grant		–		3	–	3	–	0
Arkansas		–		2	–	4	–	2
TCU		–		2	–	5	–	0
North Carolina		–		1	–	4	–	2
Oklahoma A&M		–		1	–	4	–	2
Roanoke		–		1	–	4	–	2
Rollins		–		1	–	3	–	0
Birmingham		–		0	–	2	–	1
Goldey College		–		0	–	3	–	0

The 1906 Roanoke Maroons football team represented Roanoke College as an independent during the 1906 college football season. Led by first-year head coach Frank Connor, the Maroons compiled an overall record of 1–4–2.

== Schedule ==
Date	Time	Opponent	Site	Result	Source
October 6		Fishburne Military School	Salem, VA	T 0–0	
October 13		vs. Randolph-Macon Academy	Bedford, VA	W 16–0	
October 27		at VMI	Parade Grounds; Lexington, VA	L 5–6	
November 3		at VPI	Gibboney Field; Blacksburg, VA	L 0–18	
November 9		at Hampden–Sydney	Venable Athletic Field; Hampden-Sydney, VA	T 0–0	
November 10	3:30 p.m.	at Richmond	Broad Street Park; Richmond, VA	L 6–29	
November 12		at Randolph–Macon	Ashland, VA	L 0–17	
November 24		at North Carolina A&M	Raleigh, NC	Canceled	
