= 1906 Texas A&M Aggies football team =

American college football season

1906 Texas A&M Aggies football
- Conference: Independent
- Record: 6–1
- Head coach: Walter E. Bachman (2nd season)
- Home stadium: Kyle Field

1906 Southern college football independents records
| | Conf. | | | Overall |
| Team | W | L | T | W | | L | | T |
|---|---|---|---|---|---|---|---|---|
| The Citadel | | – | | 3 | – | 0 | – | 0 |
| Kendall | | – | | 2 | – | 0 | – | 0 |
| Catholic University | | – | | 1 | – | 0 | – | 0 |
| Georgetown | | – | | 6 | – | 1 | – | 0 |
| Texas A&M | | – | | 6 | – | 1 | – | 0 |
| Delaware | | – | | 5 | – | 1 | – | 0 |
| Navy | | – | | 8 | – | 2 | – | 2 |
| Southwestern Louisiana Industrial | | – | | 1 | – | 0 | – | 1 |
| Stetson | | – | | 3 | – | 1 | – | 0 |
| Virginia | | – | | 7 | – | 2 | – | 2 |
| Howard (AL) | | – | | 6 | – | 2 | – | 1 |
| Oklahoma | | – | | 5 | – | 2 | – | 2 |
| VPI | | – | | 5 | – | 2 | – | 2 |
| Kentucky State | | – | | 4 | – | 3 | – | 0 |
| Davidson | | – | | 3 | – | 2 | – | 2 |
| Florida | | – | | 5 | – | 3 | – | 0 |
| North Carolina A&M | | – | | 3 | – | 1 | – | 4 |
| Louisiana Industrial | | – | | 2 | – | 1 | – | 3 |
| West Virginia | | – | | 5 | – | 5 | – | 0 |
| George Washington | | – | | 4 | – | 3 | – | 2 |
| VMI | | – | | 4 | – | 4 | – | 0 |
| Grant | | – | | 3 | – | 3 | – | 0 |
| Arkansas | | – | | 2 | – | 4 | – | 2 |
| TCU | | – | | 2 | – | 5 | – | 0 |
| North Carolina | | – | | 1 | – | 4 | – | 2 |
| Oklahoma A&M | | – | | 1 | – | 4 | – | 2 |
| Roanoke | | – | | 1 | – | 4 | – | 2 |
| Rollins | | – | | 1 | – | 3 | – | 0 |
| Birmingham | | – | | 0 | – | 2 | – | 1 |
| Goldey College | | – | | 0 | – | 3 | – | 0 |

The 1906 Texas A&M Aggies football team represented the Agricultural and Mechanical College of Texas—now known as Texas A&M University—as an independent during the 1906 college football season. Led by Walter E. Bachman in his second and final season as head coach, the Aggies compiled a record of 6–1.

== Schedule ==
| Date | Time | Opponent | Site | Result | Source |
|---|---|---|---|---|---|
| October 20 | | TCU | Kyle Field; College Station, TX (rivalry) | W 42–0 | |
| October 27 | 4:00 p.m. | Daniel Baker | Kyle Field; College Station, TX | W 34–0 | |
| November 5 | | at TCU | Waco, TX | W 22–0 | |
| November 12 | | Haskell | Kyle Field; College Station, TX | W 32–6 | |
| November 17 | | at Tulane | Athletic Park; New Orleans, LA | W 18–0 | |
| November 19 | | at LSU | State Field; Baton Rouge, LA (rivalry) | W 22–12 | |
| November 29 | | at Texas | Clark Field; Austin, TX (rivalry) | L 0–24 | |
