= James A. Nutter =

American football player and coach

Playing career
- 1904–1906: VPI
- Position: Quarterback

Coaching career (HC unless noted)
- 1907: Hampden–Sydney

Head coaching record
- Overall: 3–4

James Arthur Nutter was an American college football player and coach. He served as the head football coach at Hampden–Sydney College in Hampden Sydney, Virginia for one season, in 1907, compiling a record of 3–4. Nutter was the starting quarterback at Virginia Agricultural and Mechanical College and Polytechnic Institute, now known was Virginia Tech, in 1906.

== Head coaching record ==
=== Football ===
Year	Team	Overall	Conference	Standing	Bowl/playoffs
Hampden–Sydney Tigers () (1907)
1907	Hampden–Sydney	3–4			
Hampden–Sydney:		3–4			
Total:		3–4			
