= The Ballpark (Gainesville) =

Ballpark in Gainesville, Florida (1883-1946)

- Interactive map of The Ballpark
- Location: 512 SW 2nd Terrace; Gainesville, Florida 32601
- Coordinates: 29.646499°N 82.32801°W
- Owner: City of Gainesville
- Surface: Grass

Construction
- Opened: 1883
- Closed: 1946

Tenants
- Oak Hill Base Ball Club (1883–1910); Central City Giants Base Ball Club; Philadelphia Athletics (PL) (spring training) (1890); Philadelphia Phillies (NL) (spring training) (1892); East Florida Seminary (football) (1902-1904); Florida Gators football (1906-1910); Gainesville High School (football) (1906-1907); Florida Gators baseball (1907-1910)

The Ballpark was a simple multi-purpose athletic field and community space near downtown Gainesville, Florida. It was laid out in the early 1880s and was used by various local amateur and semi-professional teams along with one season of spring training by the Philadelphia Phillies of Major League Baseball. The Ballpark also served as the initial home field for the University of Florida's football and baseball teams when they were established during the 1906-1907 academic year.

The university built on-campus athletic facilities in the early 1900s and The Ballpark became a show grounds for local fairs and other outdoor events. Demand for land near the center of town increased after World War II, prompting the city to subdivide and sell off most of the parcel in the late 1940s. A small community center and playground now occupy a corner of the former site.

== History ==
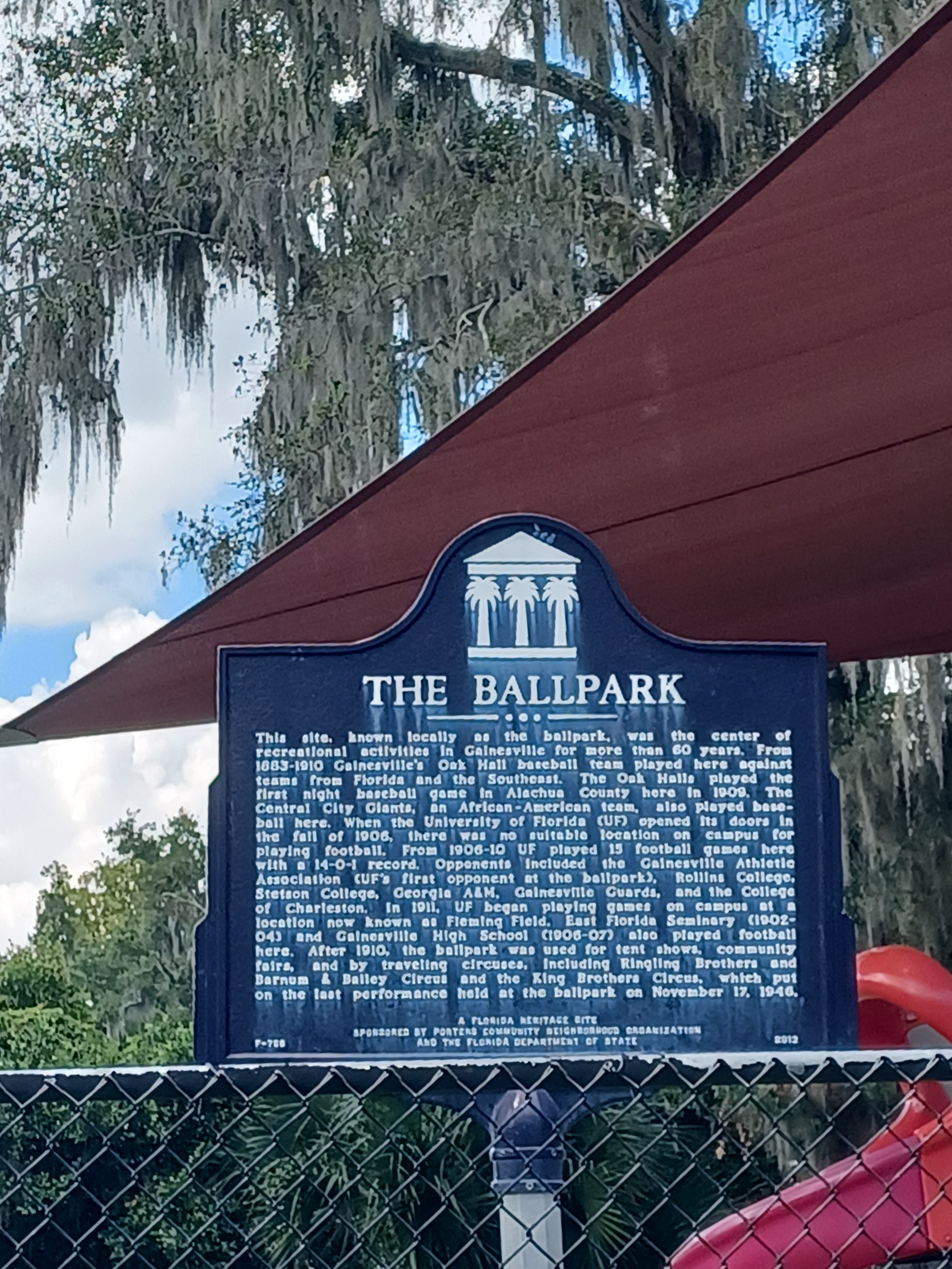
Historical marker at Porters Community Center, the former site of The Ballpark

Gainesville slowly grew and modernized after the American Civil War as its railroad depot became the main shipping point for cotton in North Central Florida. By the 1880s, the community had built its first public school building, had funded a volunteer fire department, and was in the process of bringing electricity and other utilities to its citizens.

This period of steady development also saw the proliferation of local amateur sports, most notably the athletic programs of Gainesville High School and the East Florida Seminary, which had moved from Ocala in 1866. To accommodate these teams along with large community gatherings, the city of Gainesville purchased and cleared a field just southwest of downtown in the early 1880s and converted it into a public park with enough room for baseball and other sports and, eventually, a wooden fence to allow events to charge an admission fee. The greenspace was known simply as "The Ballpark", and by 1883, it was regularly utilized for athletics, outdoor events, and general recreation.

The Players' League Philadelphia Athletics trained in Gainesville at The Ballpark in March 1890.

The National League's Philadelphia Phillies traveled to Florida for spring training before the 1892 season and used The Ballpark for practices and several exhibition games, beginning with a contest against a local amateur club on March 4. The Phillies would again hold spring training in Gainesville before the 1921 season, but on that occasion, they used Fleming Field at the University of Florida.

The new University of Florida did not yet have its own sports facilities when its Gainesville campus opened in 1906, so The Ballpark was the first home field for the school's fledgling football and baseball programs. Florida's football squads were undefeated at the site, compiling a record of 14-0-1 over five seasons, though they also played "home" contests in other cities across Florida due to the primitive nature of the municipal park.

In early 1911, the university purchased the wooden bleachers and fence from The Ballpark and moved them to its new on-campus multi-purpose facility at Fleming Field, which quickly became the preferred site for most of Gainesville’s organized sporting events. The Ballpark was largely regulated to hosting festivals and large events such as the Ringling Brothers and Barnum & Bailey Circus and was more often referred to as "the show grounds".

Gainesville entered a new period of growth after World War II, and increased demand for land near downtown prompted the city to consider other uses for the site. After a run of performances by the King Brothers Circus in November 1946, the land was subdivided into smaller parcels and mostly sold to private owners. A small portion of the old field remained under city control and is now home to the Porters Community Center and Porters Community Garden. A sign commemorating the history of the site was erected at the community center in 2012.
