= 1906 Kentucky State College Blue and White football team =

American college football season

1906 Kentucky State College Blue and White football
- Conference: Independent
- Record: 4–3
- Head coach: J. White Guyn (1st season)
- Captain: Frank Paulin

1906 Southern college football independents records
	Conf.			Overall
Team	W	L	T	W		L		T
The Citadel		–		3	–	0	–	0
Kendall		–		2	–	0	–	0
Catholic University		–		1	–	0	–	0
Georgetown		–		6	–	1	–	0
Texas A&M		–		6	–	1	–	0
Delaware		–		5	–	1	–	0
Navy		–		8	–	2	–	2
Southwestern Louisiana Industrial		–		1	–	0	–	1
Stetson		–		3	–	1	–	0
Virginia		–		7	–	2	–	2
Howard (AL)		–		6	–	2	–	1
Oklahoma		–		5	–	2	–	2
VPI		–		5	–	2	–	2
Kentucky State		–		4	–	3	–	0
Davidson		–		3	–	2	–	2
Florida		–		5	–	3	–	0
North Carolina A&M		–		3	–	1	–	4
Louisiana Industrial		–		2	–	1	–	3
West Virginia		–		5	–	5	–	0
George Washington		–		4	–	3	–	2
VMI		–		4	–	4	–	0
Grant		–		3	–	3	–	0
Arkansas		–		2	–	4	–	2
TCU		–		2	–	5	–	0
North Carolina		–		1	–	4	–	2
Oklahoma A&M		–		1	–	4	–	2
Roanoke		–		1	–	4	–	2
Rollins		–		1	–	3	–	0
Birmingham		–		0	–	2	–	1
Goldey College		–		0	–	3	–	0

The 1906 Kentucky State College Blue and White football team represented Kentucky State College—now known as the University of Kentucky—as an independent during the 1906 college football season. Led by first-year head coach J. White Guyn, the Blue and White compiled a record of 4–3.

== Schedule ==
Date	Time	Opponent	Site	Result	Source
October 6	3:15 p.m.	at Vanderbilt	Dudley Field; Nashville, TN (rivalry)	L 0–28	
October 13		Eminence Athletic Club	Lexington, KY	W 48–0	
October 27		Kentucky Military Institute	Lexington, KY	W 16–11	
November 2		Marietta	Lexington, KY	L 0–16	
November 10		Tennessee	Lexington, KY (rivalry)	W 21–0	
November 24		at Georgetown (KY)	Georgetown, KY	W 6–12	
November 29		Central University (KY)	Lexington, KY (rivalry)	L 6–12	
All times are in Eastern time
