= 1906 TCU football team =

American college football season

1906 TCU football
- Conference: Independent
- Record: 2–5
- Head coach: Emory J. Hyde (2nd season)

1906 Southern college football independents records
	Conf.			Overall
Team	W	L	T	W		L		T
The Citadel		–		3	–	0	–	0
Kendall		–		2	–	0	–	0
Catholic University		–		1	–	0	–	0
Georgetown		–		6	–	1	–	0
Texas A&M		–		6	–	1	–	0
Delaware		–		5	–	1	–	0
Navy		–		8	–	2	–	2
Southwestern Louisiana Industrial		–		1	–	0	–	1
Stetson		–		3	–	1	–	0
Virginia		–		7	–	2	–	2
Howard (AL)		–		6	–	2	–	1
Oklahoma		–		5	–	2	–	2
VPI		–		5	–	2	–	2
Kentucky State		–		4	–	3	–	0
Davidson		–		3	–	2	–	2
Florida		–		5	–	3	–	0
North Carolina A&M		–		3	–	1	–	4
Louisiana Industrial		–		2	–	1	–	3
West Virginia		–		5	–	5	–	0
George Washington		–		4	–	3	–	2
VMI		–		4	–	4	–	0
Grant		–		3	–	3	–	0
Arkansas		–		2	–	4	–	2
TCU		–		2	–	5	–	0
North Carolina		–		1	–	4	–	2
Oklahoma A&M		–		1	–	4	–	2
Roanoke		–		1	–	4	–	2
Rollins		–		1	–	3	–	0
Birmingham		–		0	–	2	–	1
Goldey College		–		0	–	3	–	0

The 1906 TCU football team represented Texas Christian University (TCU) as an independent during the 1906 college football season. Led by Emory J. Hyde in his second year as head coach, TCU compiled a record of 2–5. They played their home games in Waco, Texas.

== Schedule ==
Date	Opponent	Site	Result	Source
October 6	Fort Worth	M., K. and T. Park; Waco, TX	L 0–6	
October 13	at Texas	Clark Field; Austin, TX (rivalry)	L 0–22	
October 20	at Texas A&M	College Station, TX (rivalry)	L 0–42	
November 5	Texas A&M	Waco, TX	L 0–22	
November 10	at Daniel Baker	Brownwood, TX	L 0–4	
November 17	Texas Deaf School	Waco, TX	W 17–6	
November 29	Fort Worth	Waco, TX	W 9–5	
