= 1906 VMI Keydets football team =

American college football season

1906 VMI Keydets football
- Conference: Independent
- Record: 4–4
- Head coach: Ira Johnson (2nd season)

1906 Southern college football independents records
	Conf.			Overall
Team	W	L	T	W		L		T
The Citadel		–		3	–	0	–	0
Kendall		–		2	–	0	–	0
Catholic University		–		1	–	0	–	0
Georgetown		–		6	–	1	–	0
Texas A&M		–		6	–	1	–	0
Delaware		–		5	–	1	–	0
Navy		–		8	–	2	–	2
Southwestern Louisiana Industrial		–		1	–	0	–	1
Stetson		–		3	–	1	–	0
Virginia		–		7	–	2	–	2
Howard (AL)		–		6	–	2	–	1
Oklahoma		–		5	–	2	–	2
VPI		–		5	–	2	–	2
Kentucky State		–		4	–	3	–	0
Davidson		–		3	–	2	–	2
Florida		–		5	–	3	–	0
North Carolina A&M		–		3	–	1	–	4
Louisiana Industrial		–		2	–	1	–	3
West Virginia		–		5	–	5	–	0
George Washington		–		4	–	3	–	2
VMI		–		4	–	4	–	0
Grant		–		3	–	3	–	0
Arkansas		–		2	–	4	–	2
TCU		–		2	–	5	–	0
North Carolina		–		1	–	4	–	2
Oklahoma A&M		–		1	–	4	–	2
Roanoke		–		1	–	4	–	2
Rollins		–		1	–	3	–	0
Birmingham		–		0	–	2	–	1
Goldey College		–		0	–	3	–	0

The 1906 VMI Keydets football team represented the Virginia Military Institute (VMI) in their 16th season of organized football. The Keydets went an even 4–4 under second-year head coach Ira Johnson.

== Schedule ==
Date	Time	Opponent	Site	Result	Source
October 6		St. John's (MD)	Lexington, VA	W 15–6	
October 13		North Carolina A&M	Lexington, VA	L 0–17	
October 20		at Virginia	Charlottesville, VA	L 0–4	
October 27		Roanoke	Lexington, VA	W 6–5	
November 3		University of Maryland, Baltimore	Lexington, VA	W 33–5	
November 9		Augusta Military Academy	Lexington, VA	W 10–0	
November 17	3:00 p.m.	at Richmond	Richmond, VA (rivalry)	L 4–6	
November 29		vs. Davidson	Lynchburg, VA	L 0–6	
