= 1906 Maryland Aggies football team =

American college football season

1906 Maryland Aggies football

MIFA champion
- Conference: Maryland Intercollegiate Football Association
- Record: 5–3 (2–0 MIFA)
- Head coach: Fred K. Nielsen (2nd season)

The 1906 Maryland Aggies football team represented Maryland Agricultural College (later part of the University of Maryland) in the 1906 college football season as a member of the Maryland Intercollegiate Football Association (MIFA). In their second and final season under head coach Fred K. Nielsen, the Aggies compiled a 5–3 record, finished as MIFA champion, and were outscored by all opponents, 98 to 73. Coach Nielsen had a full-time job with the State Department while coaching football.

== Schedule ==
Date	Opponent	Site	Result	Source
September 29	Washington Technical High School*	College Park, MD	W 5–0	
October 6	Baltimore City College*	College Park, MD	W 22–0	
October 10	at Navy*	Worden Field; Annapolis, MD	L 0–12	
October 13	at Georgetown*	Georgetown Field; Washington, DC	L 0–28	
October 20	at Mount Washington Athletic Club*	Baltimore, MD	L 0–29	
November 10	at St. John's (MD)	Annapolis, MD	W 20–4	
November 17	at Rock Hill College*	Ellicott City, MD	W 17–0	
November 24	Washington College	College Park, MD	W 35–0	
*Non-conference game
