= 1906 Southern Intercollegiate Athletic Association football season =

- League: NCAA
- Sport: College football
- Duration: September 29, 1906 through December 2, 1906
- Teams: 18

Regular Season
- Season champions: Vanderbilt; Clemson

Football seasons
- 1905 1907

1906 Southern Intercollegiate Athletic Association football standings
	Conf.					Overall
Team	W		L		T	W		L		T
Vanderbilt +	4	–	0	–	0	8	–	1	–	0
Clemson +	4	–	0	–	0	4	–	0	–	3
Sewanee	5	–	1	–	0	8	–	1	–	0
Alabama	3	–	1	–	0	5	–	1	–	0
Ole Miss	3	–	2	–	0	4	–	2	–	0
Georgia Tech	3	–	3	–	0	6	–	3	–	1
Georgia	2	–	2	–	1	2	–	4	–	1
LSU	0	–	1	–	1	2	–	2	–	2
Mississippi A&M	0	–	2	–	1	2	–	2	–	1
Tennessee	0	–	3	–	1	1	–	6	–	2
Mercer	0	–	2	–	0	1	–	4	–	0
Tulane	0	–	2	–	0	0	–	4	–	1
Auburn	0	–	5	–	0	1	–	5	–	1
Cumberland (TN)			–					–
Nashville			–					–
+ – Conference co-champions

The 1906 Southern Intercollegiate Athletic Association football season was the college football games played by the member schools of the Southern Intercollegiate Athletic Association as part of the 1906 college football season. The season began on September 29.

At the end of 1905 football looked about to be abolished due to all of the reoccurring violence during games. Football was a sport that had degenerated into dangerous tactics such as: the flying wedge, punching, kicking, piling-on, and elbows to the face. Almost any violent behavior was allowed. Fatalities and injuries mounted during the 1905 season. (Note: Union College halfback Harold Moore died of a cerebral hemorrhage after being kicked in the head while attempting to tackle an NYU runner. The Chicago Tribune referred to the 1905 football season as a "death harvest", as it resulted in 19 player deaths and 137 serious injuries.)

As a result, the 1906 season was played under a new set of rules. The rules governing intercollegiate football were changed to promote a more open and less dangerous style of play. An intercollegiate conference, which would become the forerunner of the NCAA, approved radical changes including the legalization of the forward pass, allowing the punting team to recover an on-side kick as a live ball, abolishing the dangerous flying wedge, creating a neutral zone between offense and defense, and doubling the first-down distance to 10 yards, to be gained in three downs.

According to Fuzzy Woodruff, Davidson tossed the first legal forward pass in the South in the win over Georgia.

Clemson and Vanderbilt tied for the SIAA title, but few writers chose the Tigers over the vaunted Commodores. Coach Dan McGugin called the Carlisle victory "the crowning feat of the Southern Intercollegiate Athletic Association season." For some, Vanderbilt's eleven was the entire All-Southern team. Running back Owsley Manier was the first Southern player chosen third-team All-American by Walter Camp.

== Results and team statistics ==
Conf. Rank	Team	Head coach	Overall record	Conf. record	PPG	PAG
1 (tie)	Vanderbilt	Dan McGugin	8–1	4–0	30.9	1.8
1 (tie)	Clemson	Bob Williams	4–0–3	4–0–1	5.4	0.6
3	Sewanee	J. J. Quill	8–1	5–1	23.4	1.8
4	Alabama	Doc Pollard	5–1	3–1	16.2	13.7
5	Mississippi	Thomas S. Hammond	4–2	3–2	11.8	10.7
6	Georgia Tech	John Heisman	6–3–1	3–3	8.1	7.7
7	Georgia	W. S. Whitney	2–4–1	2–2–1	8.4	7.1
8	LSU	Dan A. Killian	2–2–2	0–1–1	6.7	6.2
9	Mississippi A&M	Daniel S. Martin	2–2–1	0–2–1	20.2	9.0
10 (tie)	Mercer	E. E. Tarr	1–4	0–2	6.4	32.6
10 (tie)	Tulane	John Russ	0–4–1	0–2	0.0	18.4
12	Tennessee	James DePree	1–6–2	0–3–1	1.7	14.1
13	Auburn	Mike Donahue	1–5–1	0–5	3.4	5.9

Key

PPG = Average of points scored per game
PAG = Average of points allowed per game

== Regular season ==
Index to colors and formatting
Non-conference matchup; SIAA member won
Non-conference matchup; SIAA member lost
Non-conference matchup; tie
Conference matchup

SIAA teams in bold.

=== Week one ===
Date	Visiting team	Home team	Site	Result	Attendance	Reference
September 29	Maryville (TN)	**Georgia Tech**	The Flats • Atlanta, GA	**T** 6–6		
September 29	Howard (AL)	**Mississippi A&M**	Hardy Field • Starkville, MS	**W** 30–0		
September 29	Mooney	**Sewanee**	Hardee Field • Sewanee, TN	**W** 24–0		

=== Week two ===
Date	Visiting team	Home team	Site	Result	Attendance	Reference
October 4	Maryville (TN)	**Ole Miss**	Oxford, MS	**W** 16–6		
October 6	Maryville (TN)	**Alabama**	The Quad • Tuscaloosa, AL	**W** 6–0		
October 6	North Georgia	**Georgia Tech**	The Flats • Atlanta, GA	**W** 11–0		
October 6	American Temperance	**Tennessee**	Baker-Himel Park • Knoxville, TN	**W** 10–0		
October 6	Kentucky State College	**Vanderbilt**	Dudley Field • Nashville, TN	**W** 28–0		
October 8	Maryville (TN)	**Auburn**	Drill Field • Auburn, AL	**T** 0–0		
October 8	**Mercer**	Gordon (GA)	Barnesville, GA	**L** 5–28		

=== Week three ===
Date	Visiting team	Home team	Site	Result	Attendance	Reference
October 10	Monroe Athletic Club	LSU	State Field • Baton Rouge, LA	**W** 5–0		
October 13	Gordon (GA)	Auburn	Drill Field • Auburn, AL	**W** 15–0		
October 13	Howard (AL)	Alabama	The Quad • Tuscaloosa, AL	**W** 14–0		
October 13	Grant	Georgia Tech	The Flats • Atlanta, GA	**W** 18–0		
October 13	Davidson	Georgia	Herty Field • Athens, GA	**L** 0–15		
October 13	Maryville (TN)	Tennessee	Baker-Himel Park • Knoxville, TN	**L** 0–11		
October 13	Marion	Mississippi A&M	Hardy Field • Starkville, MS	**W** 62–0		
October 13	Southwestern Presbyterian	Sewanee	Hardee Field • Sewanee, TN	**W** 57–0		
October 13	VPI	Clemson	Bowman Field • Calhoun, SC	**T** 0–0		
October 13	**Ole Miss**	Vanderbilt	Dudley Field • Nashville, TN	**VAN** 29–0		

=== Week four ===
Date	Visiting team	Home team	Site	Result	Attendance	Reference
October 20	Central University	Tennessee	Baker-Himel Park • Knoxville, TN	**L** 0–6		
October 20	Florida	Mercer	Central City Park • Macon, GA	**W** 12–0		
October 20	**Georgia**	Clemson	Bowman Field • Calhoun, SC	**CLEM** 6–0		
October 20	**Ole Miss**	LSU	State Field • Baton Rouge, LA	**MISS** 9–0		
October 20	**Sewanee**	Georgia Tech	The Flats • Atlanta, GA	**SEW** 16–0		
October 20	**Alabama**	Vanderbilt	Dudley Field • Nashville, TN	**VAN** 78–0		

=== Week five ===
Date	Visiting team	Home team	Site	Result	Attendance	Reference
October 25	**Tennessee**	American Temperance	Harriman, TN	**T** 5–5		
October 26	**Sewanee**	**Auburn**	West End Park • Birmingham, AL	**SEW** 10–5		
October 27	Davidson	**Georgia Tech**	The Flats • Atlanta, GA	**W** 4–0		
October 27	**LSU**	**Mississippi A&M**	Columbus Fairgrounds • Columbus, MS	**T** 0–0		
October 27	Howard (AL)	**Tulane**	Athletic Park • New Orleans, LA	**T** 0–0		
October 27	Texas	**Vanderbilt**	Dudley Field • Nashville, TN	**W** 45–0		

=== Week six ===
Date	Visiting team	Home team	Site	Result	Attendance	Reference
November 3	Clemson	Davidson	Latta Park • Charlotte, NC	**T** 0–0		
November 3	Alabama	**Mississippi A&M**	Hardy Field • Starkville, MS	**ALA** 16–4		
November 3	Georgia	**Mercer**	Central City Park • Macon, GA	**UGA** 55–0		
November 3	Auburn	**Georgia Tech**	The Flats • Atlanta, GA	**GT** 11–0		
November 3	Vanderbilt	Michigan	Regents Field • Ann Arbor, MI	**L** 4–10	10,000	
November 3	Sewanee	**Tennessee**	Baker-Himel Park • Knoxville, TN	**SEW** 17–0		

=== Week seven ===
Date	Visiting team	Home team	Site	Result	Attendance	Reference
November 9	Louisiana Industrial	**LSU**	State Field • Baton Rouge, LA	**W** 17–0		
November 10	**Auburn**	**Clemson**	Bowman Field • Calhoun, SC	**CLEM** 6–4		
November 10	**Georgia**	**Georgia Tech**	The Flats • Atlanta, GA	**GT** 17–0		
November 10	**Mercer**	The Citadel	Hampton Park • Charleston, SC	**L** 0–10		
November 10	**Tennessee**	Kentucky State College	Lexington, KY	**L** 0–21		
November 10	**Sewanee**	**Tulane**	Athletic Park • New Orleans, LA	**SEW** 35–0		
November 10	Rose Polytechnic	**Vanderbilt**	Dudley Field • Nashville, TN	**W** 33–0		
November 12	**Ole Miss**	**Sewanee**	Red Elm Park • Memphis, TN	**SEW** 24–0		

=== Week eight ===
Date	Visiting team	Home team	Site	Result	Attendance	Reference
November 17	**Auburn**	Alabama	State Fairgrounds • Birmingham, AL	**ALA** 10–0		
November 17	Maryville (TN)	Sewanee	Hardee Field • Sewanee, TN	**W** 28–0		
November 17	Texas A&M	Tulane	Athletic Park • New Orleans, LA	**L** 0–18		
November 17	**Vanderbilt**	Georgia Tech	The Flats • Atlanta, GA	**VAN** 37–6	5,000	
November 19	**Tennessee**	Clemson	Bowman Field • Calhoun, SC	**CLEM** 16–0		
November 19	Texas A&M	LSU	State Field • Baton Rouge, LA	**L** 12–22		

=== Week nine ===
Date	Visiting team	Home team	Site	Result	Attendance	Reference
November 21	**Tennessee**	**Georgia**	Herty Field • Athens, GA	**T** 0–0		
November 24	Arkansas	**Tulane**	Athletic Park • New Orleans, LA	**L** 0–22		
November 24	**Georgia Tech**	**Mercer**	Central City Park • Macon, GA	**GT** 61–0		
November 24	Carlisle	**Vanderbilt**	Dudley Field • Nashville, TN	**W** 4–0		

=== Week ten ===
Date	Visiting team	Home team	Site	Result	Attendance	Reference
November 29	**Tennessee**	**Alabama**	State Fairgrounds • Birmingham, AL	**ALA** 51–0		
November 29	Arkansas	**LSU**	State Field • Baton Rouge, LA	**T** 6–6		
November 29	**Clemson**	**Georgia Tech**	The Flats • Atlanta, GA	**CLEM** 10–0		
November 29	**Auburn**	**Georgia**	Central City Park • Macon, GA	**UGA** 4–0		
November 29	**Ole Miss**	**Mississippi A&M**	State Fairgrounds • Jackson, MS	**MISS** 29–5		
November 29	**Sewanee**	**Vanderbilt**	Dudley Field • Nashville, TN	**VAN** 20–0	6,000	
December 1	**Georgia**	Savannah A. C.	Savannah, GA	**L** 0–12		

== Awards and honors ==
=== All-Americans ===
- FB – Owsley Manier, Vanderbilt (WC-3)

=== All-Southern team ===
The composite All-Southern eleven representing the consensus of newspapers as published in Fuzzy Woodruff's A History of Southern Football 1890–1928 included:

Position	Name	Team
QB	Sam Costen	Vanderbilt
HB	Dan Blake	Vanderbilt
HB	Honus Craig	Vanderbilt
FB	Owsley Manier	Vanderbilt
E	Bob Blake	Vanderbilt
T	Joe Pritchard	Vanderbilt
G	Walter K. Chorn	Vanderbilt
C	Stein Stone	Vanderbilt
G	Clyde R. Conner	Mississippi
T	Lex Stone	Sewanee
E	Lob Brown	Georgia Tech
