= Bob Williams (coach, born 1877) =

American football coach and administrator (1877–1957)

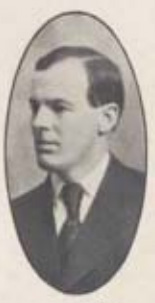
- Williams pictured in The Bugle 1908, Virginia Tech yearbook

Biographical details
- Born: August 1, 1877; Bland, Virginia, U.S.
- Died: October 17, 1957 (aged 80); DeLand, Florida, U.S.

Playing career
- 1901: Virginia
- Position: End

Coaching career (HC unless noted)
- 1902–1903: South Carolina
- 1904–1905: Davidson
- 1906: Clemson
- 1907: VPI
- 1908: Virginia (assistant)
- 1909: Clemson
- 1913–1915: Clemson
- 1926: Clemson

Administrative career (AD unless noted)
- 1913–1915: Clemson

Head coaching record
- Overall: 51–29–7

Charles Robert Williams (August 1, 1877 – October 17, 1957) was an American football coach and college athletics administrator. Williams coached at South Carolina, Davidson, Clemson, and Virginia Tech.

== Early years ==
Williams was born on August 1, 1877, in Bland, Virginia. He attended the University of Virginia, where he was an end on the football team.

== Coaching career ==
=== South Carolina ===
Graduating in 1902, Williams served as the Gamecocks' mentor for two seasons, 1902 and 1903, achieving 6–1 and 8–2 records. In 1902, he oversaw an upset of the rival Clemson Tigers, who were coached by John Heisman. This was the only game lost by the Tigers that year.

=== Davidson ===
From 1904 to 1905 he coached at Davidson, where he compiled a 9–5–1 record.

=== Clemson ===
Williams came to Clemson in 1906. The Tigers went undefeated with a 4–0–3 record, with wins over Georgia, Auburn, Tennessee, and the John Heisman-coached Georgia Tech team. Clemson's first forward pass took place on November 29, 1906, during the game with Georgia Tech in Atlanta. Left End Powell Lykes, dropped back to kick, but lobbed a 30-yard pass to George Warren instead. Clemson won, 10–0.

=== VPI ===
Williams left for VPI for the 1907 season, leading them to a 7–2 record.

=== Returns to Clemson ===
Williams then returned to Clemson in 1909. The 1909 season was notable for the resumption of the Clemson-Carolina rivalry after a five-year gap, caused by a near-riot in October 1902. The Tigers enjoyed a 6–3 season under Williams' guidance and defeated the Gamecocks, 6–0, in Columbia on November 4.

Williams was replaced by Frank Dobson in 1910 who had a three-year run at the school. With Dobson's departure after the 1912 season, Williams returned for the second time to the Clemson head coaching position. He, too, served for three years, from 1913 to 1915. The Tigers produced records of 4–4 in 1913, 5–3–1 in 1914, and 2–4–2 in 1915. In the 41 games that Williams coached in five seasons, he went 21–14–6, for a .585 winning percentage.

Between the years of 1915 and 1926, Williams practiced law in Roanoke, Virginia, and owned a contracting business with his brother. He also served as an official for college football games, including high profile games between Georgia Tech and Notre Dame in the early 1920s.

He returned to coach Clemson for the final five games of the 1926 season after Bud Saunders was fired.

== Death ==
Williams died after a stroke in DeLand, Florida, in 1957.

== Head coaching record ==
Year	Team	Overall	Conference	Standing	Bowl/playoffs
South Carolina Gamecocks (Independent) (1902–1903)
1902	South Carolina	6–1			
1903	South Carolina	8–2			
South Carolina:		14–3			
Davidson (Independent) (1904–1905)
1904	Davidson	6–1–1			
1905	Davidson	3–4			
Davidson:		9–5–1			
Clemson Tigers (Southern Intercollegiate Athletic Association) (1906)
1906	Clemson	4–0–3	4–0–2	T–1st	
VPI (Independent) (1907)
1907	VPI	7–2			
VPI:		7–2			
Clemson Tigers (Southern Intercollegiate Athletic Association) (1909)
1909	Clemson	6–3	2–2		
Clemson Tigers (Southern Intercollegiate Athletic Association) (1913–1915)
1913	Clemson	4–4	2–4		
1914	Clemson	5–3–1	3–2		
1915	Clemson	2–4–2	1–0–1		
Clemson Tigers (Southern Conference) (1926)
1926	Clemson	0–5 (Note: Bud Saunders coached the first four games of the season, during which Clemson had a 2–2 record overall and a 1–1 conference mark, before resigning. Clemson finished with an overall record of 2–7 and a conference mark of 1–3, placing 18th in the Southern Conference.)	0–2	18th	
Clemson:		21–19–6			
Total:		51–29–7			
National championship Conference title Conference division title or championship game berth
