= 1906 Vanderbilt Commodores football team =

American college football season

1906 Vanderbilt Commodores football
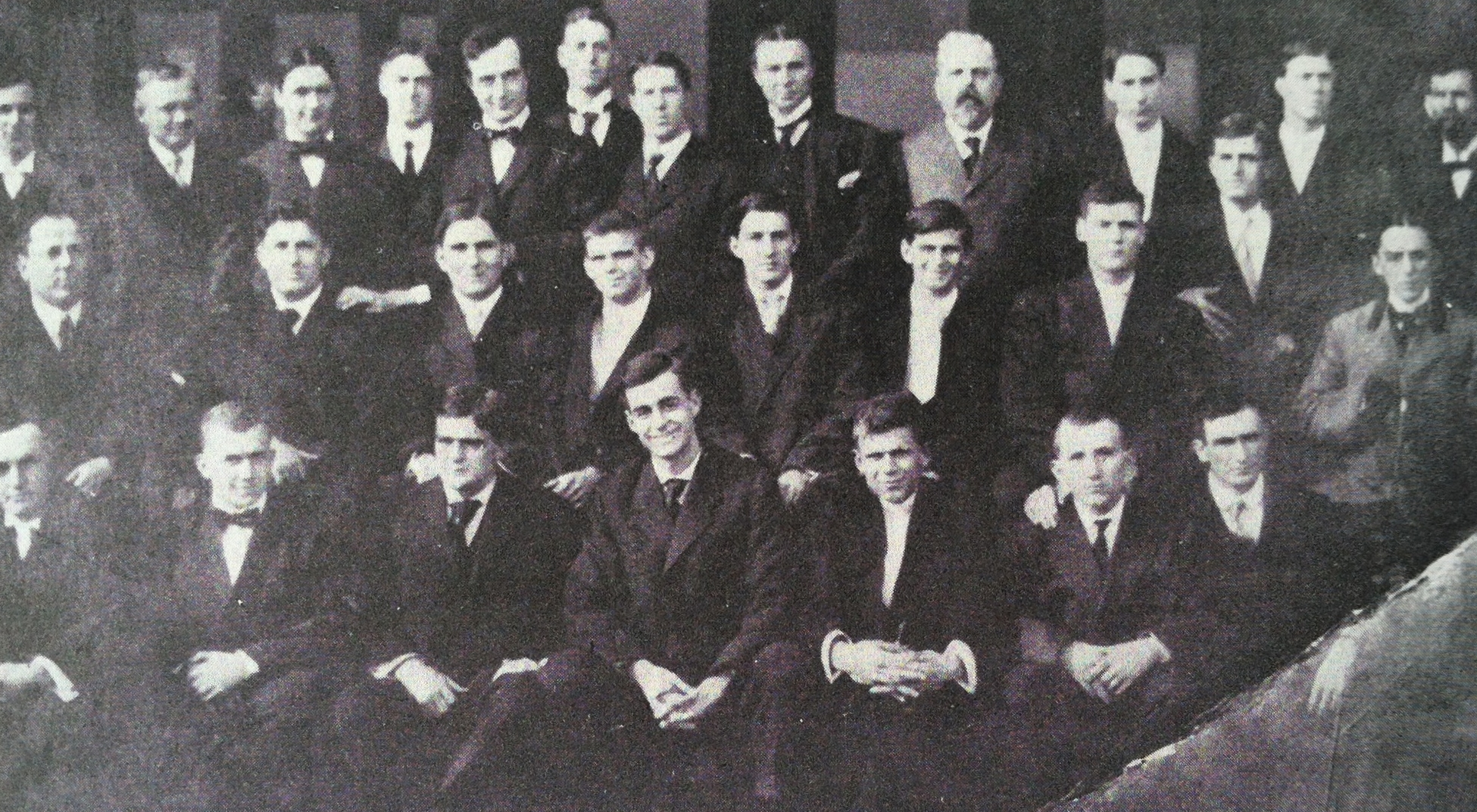

National champion (Billinglsey) SIAA champion
- Conference: Southern Intercollegiate Athletic Association
- Record: 8–1 (5–0 SIAA)
- Head coach: Dan McGugin (3rd season)
- Offensive scheme: Short punt
- Captain: Dan Blake
- Home stadium: Dudley Field

1906 Southern Intercollegiate Athletic Association football standings
	Conf.					Overall
Team	W		L		T	W		L		T
Vanderbilt +	4	–	0	–	0	8	–	1	–	0
Clemson +	4	–	0	–	0	4	–	0	–	3
Sewanee	5	–	1	–	0	8	–	1	–	0
Alabama	3	–	1	–	0	5	–	1	–	0
Ole Miss	3	–	2	–	0	4	–	2	–	0
Georgia Tech	3	–	3	–	0	6	–	3	–	1
Georgia	2	–	2	–	1	2	–	4	–	1
LSU	0	–	1	–	1	2	–	2	–	2
Mississippi A&M	0	–	2	–	1	2	–	2	–	1
Tennessee	0	–	3	–	1	1	–	6	–	2
Mercer	0	–	2	–	0	1	–	4	–	0
Tulane	0	–	2	–	0	0	–	4	–	1
Auburn	0	–	5	–	0	1	–	5	–	1
Cumberland (TN)			–					–
Nashville			–					–
+ – Conference co-champions

The 1906 Vanderbilt Commodores football team represented Vanderbilt University during the 1906 Southern Intercollegiate Athletic Association football season. The team's head coach was Dan McGugin, who served his third season in that capacity. Members of the Southern Intercollegiate Athletic Association (SIAA), the Commodores played seven home games in Nashville, Tennessee at Curry Field, (Note: Also known as Old Dudley Field, after 1922 it is known as Curry Field, after Irby Curry, a Vanderbilt quarterback who died in the First World War.) and finished the season with a record of 8–1 overall and 5–0 in SIAA.

The 1906 Vanderbilt team had one of the best seasons in the school's history, outscoring opponents 278–16. Innis Brown rated the 1906 team as the best the South ever had. Vanderbilt won all of its home games, finishing the season on a 23-game home win streak. Their only loss came on the road to western power Michigan, 10–4; the game had been tied until the closing minutes.

Seven of the Commodores' eight wins came by shutout – only two teams scored on them all season. Several teams failed to gain a single first down against the Commodores. The team most notably defeated northern power Carlisle by a single Bob Blake field goal 4–0. Back Owsley Manier was selected third-team All-America by Walter Camp, the South's first.

== Schedule ==
Date	Opponent	Site	Result	Attendance	Source
October 6	Kentucky State College*	Dudley Field; Nashville, TN (rivalry)	W 28–0		
October 13	Ole Miss	Dudley Field; Nashville, TN (rivalry)	W 29–0		
October 20	Alabama	Dudley Field; Nashville, TN	W 78–0		
October 27	Texas	Dudley Field; Nashville, TN	W 45–0		
November 3	at Michigan*	Regents Field; Ann Arbor, MI	L 4–10	10,000	
November 10	Rose Polytechnic*^{†}	Dudley Field; Nashville, TN	W 33–0		
November 17	at Georgia Tech	The Flats; Atlanta, GA (rivalry)	W 37–6	5,000	
November 22	Carlisle*	Dudley Field; Nashville, TN	W 4–0	8,000	
November 29	Sewanee	Dudley Field; Nashville, TN (rivalry)	W 20–0	6,000	
*Non-conference game; ^{†}Homecoming

== Before the season ==
Notable losses from the 1905 team included Bachelor of Ugliness Ed Hamilton, captain Innis Brown, and quarterback Frank Kyle.

=== Rule changes ===
At the end of 1905 football looked about to be abolished due to all of the reoccurring violence during games. Football was a sport that had degenerated into dangerous tactics such as: the flying wedge, punching, kicking, piling-on, and elbows to the face. Almost any violent behavior was allowed. Fatalities and injuries mounted during the 1905 season. (Note: Union College halfback Harold Moore died of a cerebral hemorrhage after being kicked in the head while attempting to tackle an NYU runner. The Chicago Tribune referred to the 1905 football season as a "death harvest", as it resulted in 19 player deaths and 137 serious injuries.)

As a result, the 1906 season was played under a new set of rules. The rules governing intercollegiate football were changed to promote a more open and less dangerous style of play. An intercollegiate conference, which would become the forerunner of the NCAA, approved radical changes including the legalization of the forward pass, allowing the punting team to recover an on-side kick as a live ball, abolishing the dangerous flying wedge, creating a neutral zone between offense and defense, and doubling the first-down distance to 10 yards, to be gained in three downs.

== Game summaries ==
=== Week 1: Kentucky State ===
Kentucky State at Vanderbilt

Team	1	2	Total
Kentucky St.	0	0	0
• Vanderbilt	18	10	28

- Date: October 6
- Location: Curry Field • Nashville, Tennessee
- Game start: 3:15 p. m.
- Referee: Bradley Walker

In a 28–0 win over Kentucky State College to open the season, Owsley Manier scored three touchdowns and the Commodores as a whole rushed for 630 yards. G. A. Hall had a 33-yard punt return for a touchdown. The Commodores were penalized several times. Kentucky never had a first down and had to punt after second down.

The starting lineup was: Stone (left end); Pritchard (left tackle); King (left guard); Wynne (center); Sherrill (right guard); E. Noel (right tackle); B. Blake (right end); Costen (quarterback); Crawford (left halfback); Craig (right halfback); Manier (fullback).

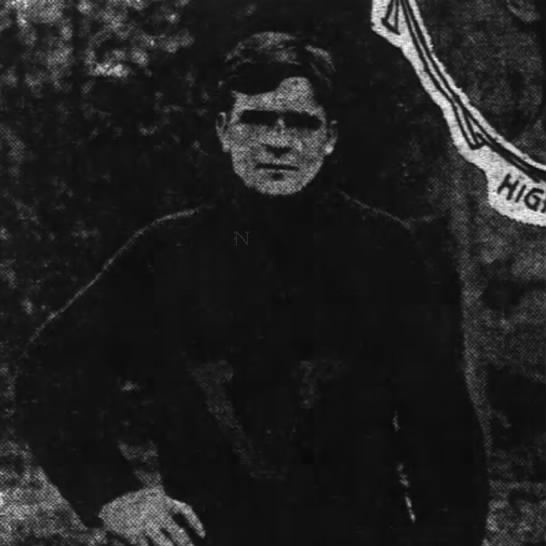
Honus Craig

=== Week 2: Ole Miss ===
Mississippi vs. Vanderbilt

Team	1	2	Total
Mississippi	0	0	0
• Vanderbilt	12	17	29

- Date: October 13
- Location: Curry Field • Nashville, Tennessee
- Referee: Bradley Walker

Vanderbilt easily beat Mississippi 29–0. Like McGugin, Mississippi's coach Thomas S. Hammond was a Michigan alumnus. One account reads: "whatever hopes the spectators had of seeing a close and exciting football game today when Vanderbilt faced Mississippi were shattered in the very first five minutes of play." The stars of the contest were Dan Blake and Honus Craig. Mississippi failed to gain a single first down. Umpire Henry D. Phillips kicked Joe Pritchard out of the contest for roughing.

The starting lineup was: V. Blake (left end); E. Noel (left tackle); McLain (left guard); Stone (center); Chorn (right guard); Pritchard (right tackle); B. Blake (right end); Costen (quarterback); D. Blake (left halfback); Craig (right halfback); Manier (fullback).

=== Week 3: Alabama ===
Alabama at Vanderbilt

Team	1	2	Total
Alabama	0	0	0
• Vanderbilt	57	21	78

- Date: October 13
- Location: Curry Field • Nashville, Tennessee

The only loss of the year for the Alabama Crimson Tide was its biggest ever loss to Vanderbilt, 78–0. Seven of Alabama's regular players were out with injuries. Vanderbilt executed several onside kicks from scrimmage. Owsley Manier scored five touchdowns as: "the back field frequently went twenty-five or thirty yards over the line". Alabama was held to just a single first down. Due to injuries, Alabama had not wished to play, and: "the comparatively few who came to see them play were scarcely rewarded by seeing touchdowns made every two minutes."

The starting lineup was: V. Blake (left end); Pritchard (left tackle); McLain (left guard); Stone (center), Chorn (right guard); E. Noel (right tackle); B. Blake (right end); Costen (quarterback); D. Blake (left halfback); Craig (right halfback); Manier (fullback).

=== Week 4: Texas ===
Vanderbilt romped over the Texas Longhorns 45–0. Sam Costen had a run of 61 yards, Dan Blake one of 52, and Vaughn Blake 42. Two other touchdowns were had by Vanderbilt but referee Bradley Walker called the team back for holding. The Texas men seemed equal to Vanderbilt's in physique, yet they too failed to net a first down.

The starting lineup was: V. Blake (left end); Pritchard (left tackle); Chorn (left guard); Stone (center); McLain (right guard); E. Noel (right tackle); B. Blake (right end); Costen (quarterback); Craig (left halfback); D. Blake (right halfback); Manier (fullback).

=== Week 5: at Michigan ===
Vanderbilt at Michigan

Team	1	2	Total
Vanderbilt	0	4	4
• Michigan	4	6	10

- Date: November 3
- Location: Ferry Field • Ann Arbor, Michigan
- Game attendance: 10,000
- Referee: Clarence Eldridge

On November 3, Vanderbilt lost to the Michigan Wolverines by a 10–4 score. The game remained tied at 4–4 until the closing minutes. The Masonic Theater in Nashville was crowded with those who had come to see the game detailed.

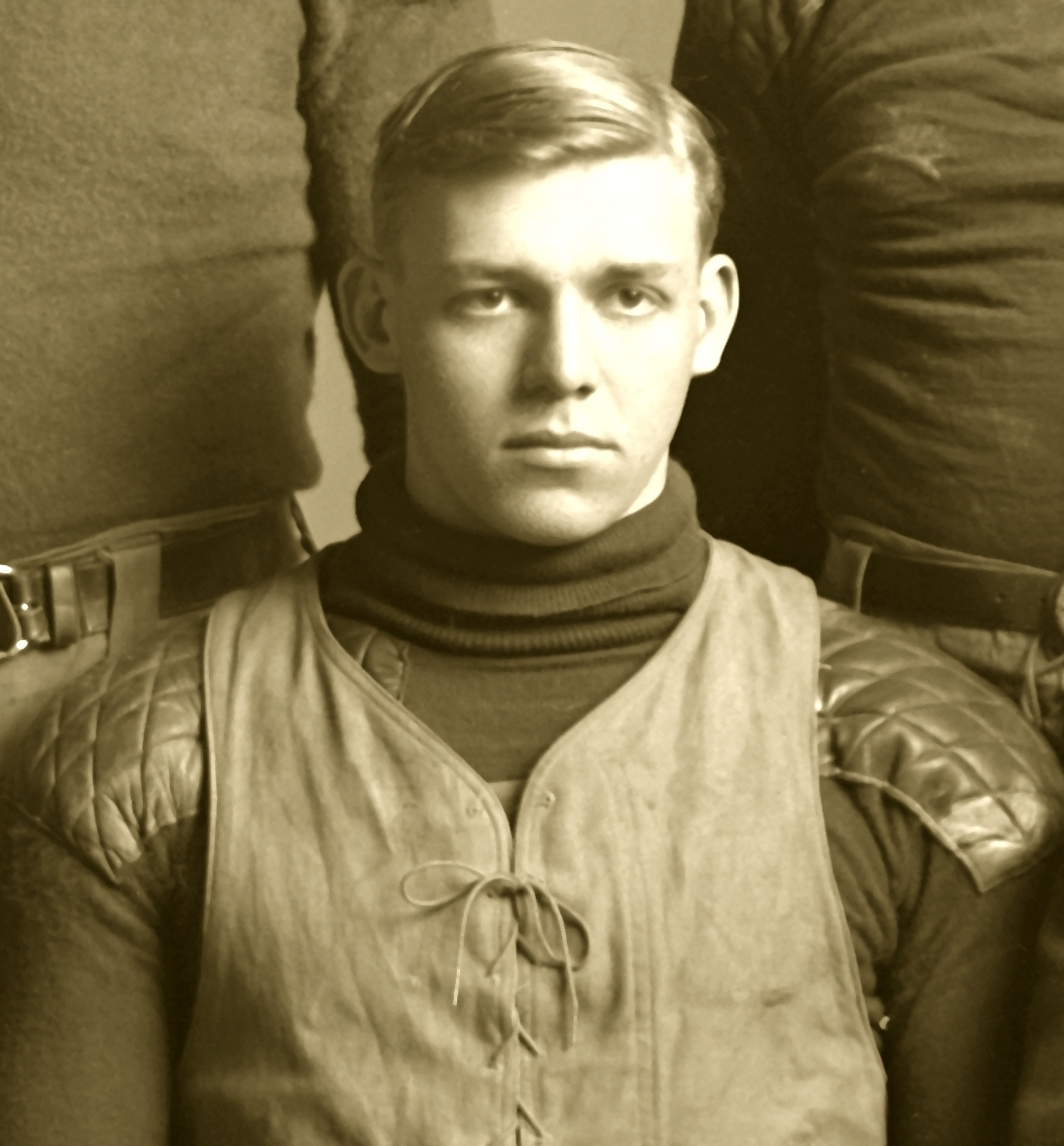
John Garrels

Before the game, Michigan coach Fielding Yost said: "I have said right along that the Vanderbilt team would come nearer beating us than any team ever did...In Craig, Blake, and Manier I think Vanderbilt has the three greatest backs of any one team in the country." On the night just before the game, 4,200 students attended a mass meeting at University Hall. McGugin and Yost both spoke to the crowd and agreed that the game would be one of the closest played in Ann Arbor in many years. D. G. Fite, father-in-law of both McGugin and Yost, traveled from his home in Tennessee to watch the game.

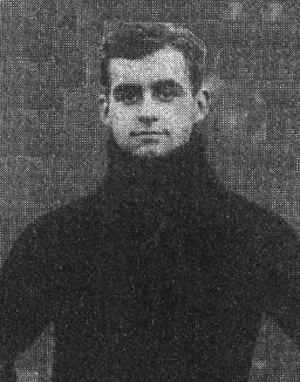
Owsley Manier

John Garrels put Michigan ahead with a field goal from the 25-yard line. On the preceding drive, Garrels had completed a 15-yard forward pass to Bishop, the first legal forward pass completed by Michigan under the new rules. Michigan led, 4–0, at halftime. Early in the second half, Vanderbilt tied the score with a field goal by Dan Blake from the 30-yard line. With two minutes left in the game, Garrels ran 68 yards for a touchdown. The Chicago Daily Tribune wrote: "Garrels, on a fake kick, with splendid interference by Hammond, Curtis, and Workman, ran Vanderbilt's left end at lightning speed for sixty-eight yards and a touchdown." Curtis kicked the extra point, and Michigan led, 10–4.

The starting lineup was: V. Blake (left end); Pritchard (left tackle); Chorn (left guard); Stone (center); McLain (right guard); E. Noel (right tackle); B. Blake (right end); Costen (quarterback); Craig (left halfback); D. Blake (right halfback); Manier (fullback).

=== Week 6: Rose Polytechnic ===
The 33 to 0 win over Rose Polytechnic proved the surprise of the season. Owsley Manier again scored five touchdowns, but he also: "probably prevented the visitors from scoring by his clever defensive work." Bob Blake kicked four extra points and a 20-yard field goal from placement.

The starting lineup was: V. Blake (left end); Pritchard (left tackle); McLain (left guard); Stone (center); Chorn (right guard); E. Noel (right tackle); B. Blake (right end); Costen (quarterback); D. Blake (left halfback); Craig (right halfback); Manier (fullback).

=== Week 7: at Georgia Tech ===
Vanderbilt at Georgia Tech

Team	1	2	Total
• Vanderbilt	23	14	37
Ga Tech	0	6	6

- Date: November 17
- Location: The Flats • Atlanta
- Game attendance: 5,000
- Referee: Bradley Walker

Vanderbilt defeated coach John Heisman, who had helped legalize the forward pass, and his Georgia Tech team in the rain and mud of Atlanta 37–6. Lobster Brown scored Tech's points. Atlanta Constitution sportswriter Alex Lynn wrote after the game that Owsley Manier was: "the greatest fullback and all round man ever seen in Atlanta." He again scored five touchdowns.

The starting lineup was: V. Blake (left end); Pritchard (left tackle); McLain (left guard); Stone (center); Chorn (right guard); E. Noel (right tackle); B. Blake (right end); Costen (quarterback); D. Blake (left halfback); Craig (right halfback); Manier (fullback).

=== Week 8: Carlisle ===
Carlisle vs. Vanderbilt

Team	1	2	Total
Carlisle	0	0	0
• Vanderbilt	4	0	4

- Date: November 22
- Location: Curry Field • Nashville, Tennessee
- Game attendance: 8,000
- Referee: Mike Thompson

On Thanksgiving, the Commodores reached the season's high point and beat the Carlisle Indians 4–0. Just a week before the contest, Vanderbilt negotiated a game with Carlisle to fill an open date. The Nashville Banner predicted it would be: "the greatest game the south ever saw." The game started forty-five minutes late to accommodate the large crowd.

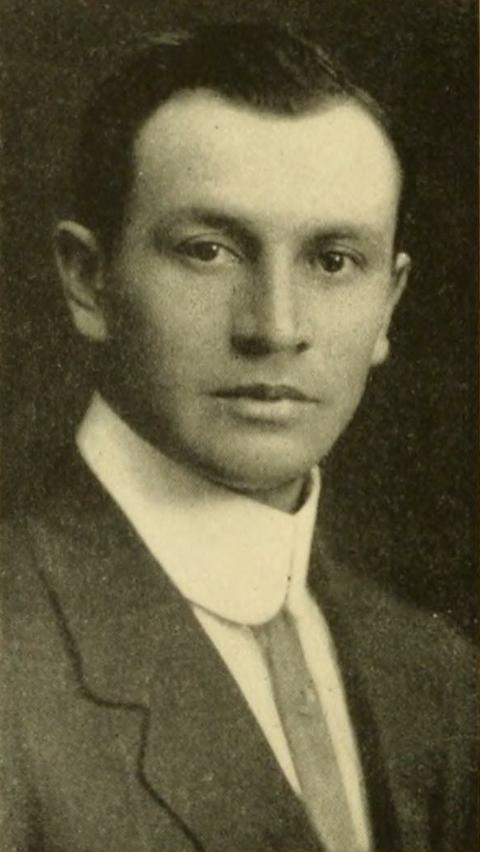
Frank Mount Pleasant

Vanderbilt won by a single, 17-yard Bob Blake field goal 4–0. In the first two minutes of play, the Indians drove the ball to Vanderbilt's 3-yard line, but the Commodores line held and they got no further. Frank Mount Pleasant, one of the first regular spiral pass quarterbacks, attempted four field goals, but missed them all.

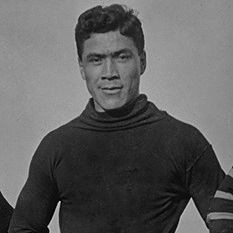
Albert Exendine

Atlanta Constitution sporting editor A. W. Lynn wrote: "The general surprises are numerous enough, but the largest particular one was the Commodore–Indian contest, when Vanderbilt took off the greatest honors ever falling to the lot of a southern football team in the hardest battle ever fought on a southern gridiron. John Heisman wrote: "Manier bucked the Indians' line. Costen handled the ball surely and well downed Mt. Pleasant in his tracks on most of Blake's punts...I am still convinced that outside Yale and Princeton, the Commodores would have an even break with any other team in the country." Vanderbilt running back Honus Craig called this his hardest game, giving special praise to Albert Exendine as: "the fastest end I ever saw."

One source claims the Carlisle Indians failed to receive supplies on the trip to Nashville, including their receiving carboys emptied of water. "The Indians had the poorest kind of accommodations at Nashville, and on account of the change of water every one of them became ill."

The starting lineup was: V. Blake (left end); Pritchard (left tackle); McLain (left guard); Stone (center); Chorn (right guard); E. Noel (right tackle); B. Blake (right end); Costen (quarterback); D. Blake (left halfback); Craig (right halfback); Manier (fullback).

=== Week 9: Sewanee ===
Sewanee vs. Vanderbilt

Team	1	2	Total
Sewanee	0	0	0
• Vanderbilt	10	10	20

- Date: November 30
- Location: Curry Field • Nashville, Tennessee
- Game attendance: 6,000
- Referee: George W. Rowbotham (Memphis)

Despite Vanderbilt's strong record, the Sewanee Tigers were undefeated and felt cause for optimism in the effective Southern championship. One account recalls: "A high authority on foot-ball said the other day: Vanderbilt is not invincible, by a good deal. The Sewanee "Tigers" are going to Nashville on Thursday to prove that fact." Vanderbilt struggled, but still won 20–0. "With Vandy making only 20 points–Vandy was stale, was the explanation." After the big win over Carlisle, "a matter-of-course feeling pervaded the entire game." The first score of the game came on a 25-yard field goal. The first touchdown came from Owsley Manier. In the second half, Bob Blake made a 22-yard field goal, and Manier got another touchdown.

The starting lineup was: V. Blake (left end); Pritchard (left tackle); McLain (left guard); Stone (center); Chorn (right guard); E. Noel (right tackle); B. Blake (right end); Costen (quarter); D. Blake (left halfback); Craig (right halfback); Manier (fullback).

== After the season ==
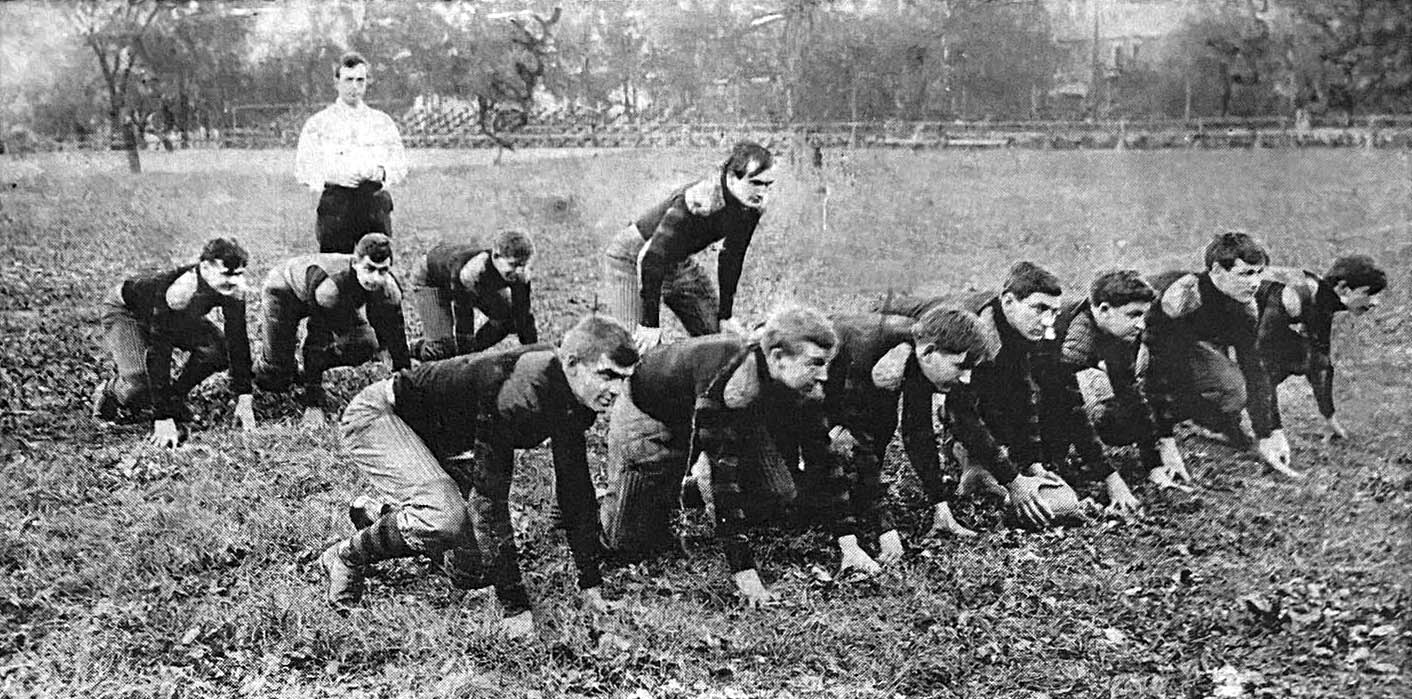
The Commodores in action.

Vanderbilt won an SIAA championship. Coach McGugin called the Carlisle victory "the crowning feat of the Southern Intercollegiate Athletic Association season."

Dan Blake, Owsley Manier, and Joe Pritchard all graduated. Manier went on to receive an M. D. from the University of Pennsylvania, and played one season on the football team. "But his effectiveness at Pennsylvania was lessened by the attempt of the coaches to change his style of bucking a line from the low, plunging dive to running into it erect, knees drawn high and great dependence upon his companion backs to "hike" him." At Penn he was shifted to halfback, and mostly used for swift plunges into the line. Penn defeated Michigan, exacting revenge for the multiple losses suffered by Manier to Michigan at Vanderbilt.

Dan Blake went on to coach at Hopkinsville High School in Hopkinsville, Kentucky. While there he was manager of the electric light and gas plants of the Kentucky Public Service Company. Pritchard coached at LSU for part of one season and was later a Presbyterian dental missionary at Luebo in the Congo until he was forced to return to the United States due to poor health sometime before 1915.

=== Awards and honors ===
For some, Vanderbilt's eleven was the entire All-Southern team. Fullback Owsley Manier was selected third-team All-America by Walter Camp. This makes Manier the first Southern player to make any of Camp's teams.

=== Legacy ===
In 1911, Innis Brown rated the 1906 team as the best the South ever had. Sportswriter Joe Williams recalled "I suppose the first great Southern team was Vanderbilt of 1906."

== Personnel ==
=== Depth chart ===
The following chart provides a visual depiction of Vanderbilt's lineup during the 1906 season with games started at the position reflected in parentheses. The chart mimics a short punt formation while on offense, with the quarterback under center.

LE
Vaughn Blake (8)
Stein Stone (1)
Alex Cunningham (0)

LT	LG	C	RG	RT
Joe Pritchard (8)	Fatty McLain (6)	Stein Stone (8)	Walter K. Chorn (6)	Edwin T. Noel (8)
Edwin T. Noel (1)	Walter K. Chorn (2)	F. O. Wynne (1)	Fatty McLain (2)	Joe Pritchard (1)
	J. J. King (1)		Horace Sherrell (1)	

RE
Bob Blake (9)
Oscar Noel (0)

QB
Sam Costen (9)
G. A. Hall (0)

LHB	RHB
Dan Blake (6)	Honus Craig (7)
Honus Craig (2)	Dan Blake (2)
Guy Crawford (1)	J. E. Lockhart (0)

FB
Owsley Manier (9)
Guy Crawford (0)

–

=== Varsity letterwinners ===
==== Line ====
Player	Position	Games started	Hometown	Prep school	Height	Weight	Age
Bob Blake	End	9	Cuero, Texas	Bowen School	6'0"	172	21
Vaughn Blake	End	8	Cuero, Texas	Bowen School		151	19
Walter K. Chorn	Guard	8	Fayette, Missouri			172	21
Fatty McLain	Guard	8	Gloster, Mississippi			198	21
Edwin T. Noel	Tackle	9	Nashville, Tennessee	Bowen School		178	19
Oscar Noel	End	0	Nashville, Tennessee	Bowen School			
Joe Pritchard	Tackle	8	Franklin, Tennessee	Mooney School	6'2"	196	20
Stein Stone	Center	9	Nashville, Tennessee	Mooney School	6'3"	175	22

==== Backfield ====
Player	Position	Games started	Hometown	Prep school	Height	Weight	Age
Dan Blake	Halfback	8	Cuero, Texas	Bowen School	5'11"	165	23
Sam Costen	Quarterback	9	McKenzie, Tennessee			150	24
Honus Craig	Halfback	9	Culleoka, Tennessee	Branham & Hughes School	5'9"	168	22
G. A. Hall	Quarterback	0	Nashville, Tennessee	Wallace University School			
Owsley Manier	Fullback	9	Nashville, Tennessee	Wallace University School	6'2"	170	19

=== Subs ===
Player	Position	Games started	Hometown	Prep school	Height	Weight	Age
Guy Crawford	Halfback	1	Bell Buckle, Tennessee	Branham & Hughes School			
Alex Cunningham	End	0	Nashville, Tennessee	Montgomery Bell Academy			
J. J. King	Guard	1					
J. E. Lockhart	Halfback	0					
Horace Sherrell	Guard	1	Dellrose, Tennessee				
F. O. Wynne	Center	1					

=== Scoring leaders ===
In 1906, touchdowns were worth 5 points and field goals 4.

Player	Touchdowns	Extra points	Field goals	Safeties	Points
Owsley Manier	23	0	0	0	115
Bob Blake	3	32	5	0	67
Honus Craig	7	0	0	0	35
Dan Blake	6	0	1	0	34
Sam Costen	2	0	0	0	10
Vaughn Blake	1	0	0	0	5
Guy Crawford	1	0	0	0	5
G. A. Hall	1	0	0	0	5
N/A	0	0	0	1	2
TOTAL	44	32	6	1	278

== See also ==
- 1906 College Football All-Southern Team
- 1906 College Football All-America Team
- 1906 Southern Intercollegiate Athletic Association football season

== Bibliography ==
- Traughber, Bill (2011). Vanderbilt Football: Tales of Commodore Gridiron History. The History Press. ISBN 978-1-60949-423-0.
- Vanderbilt University (1907). Vanderbilt University Quarterly. Vol. 7.
