= 1906 College Football All-Southern Team =

American all-star college football team

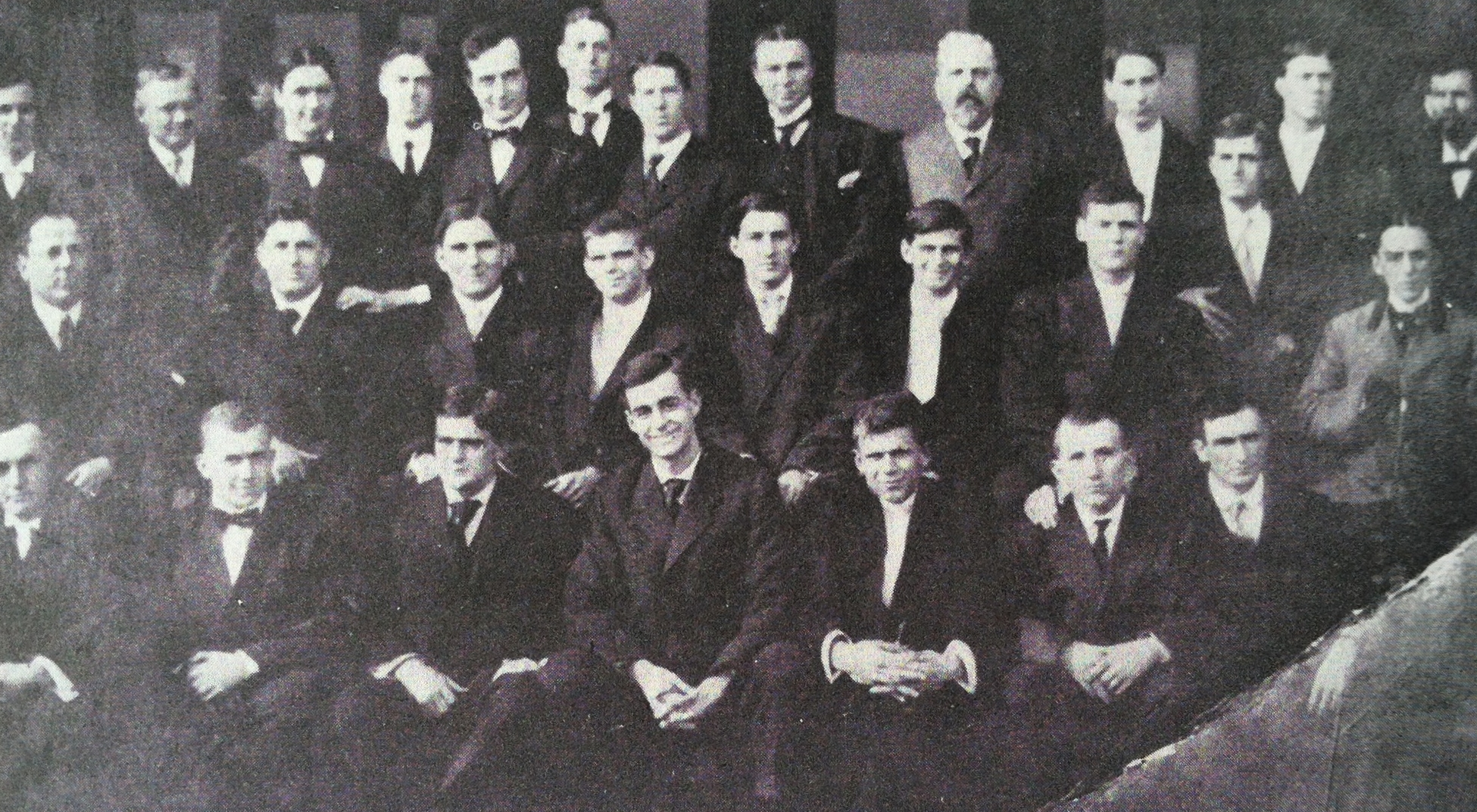
The 1906 Vanderbilt Commodores

The 1906 College Football All-Southern Team consists of American football players selected to the College Football All-Southern Teams selected by various organizations for the 1906 Southern Intercollegiate Athletic Association football season. For some, the SIAA champion 1906 Vanderbilt Commodores football team made up the entire team. It would produce eight of the composite eleven. Owsley Manier was selected by Walter Camp third-team All-American. Vanderbilt won the SIAA championship.

== Consensus eleven ==
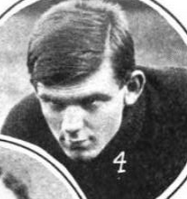
Bob Blake

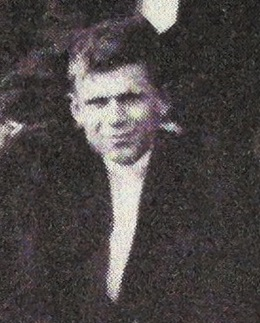
Dan Blake

The All-Southern eleven representing the consensus of newspapers as published in Fuzzy Woodruff's A History of Southern Football 1890-1928 included:

- Bob Blake, end for Vanderbilt, unanimous selection, was a lawyer and Rhodes Scholar. Blake made the drop kick to beat Carlisle, "the crowning feat of the Southern Intercollegiate Athletic Association season." He was selected for the Associated Press Southeast Area All-Time football team 1869-1919 era.
- Dan Blake, halfback for Vanderbilt, unanimous selection, brother of Bob. He later coached.
- Lob Brown, end for Georgia Tech, captain-elect who helped Tech to its first defeat over Auburn.
- Walter K. Chorn, guard for Vanderbilt, was a lawyer and one time insurance superintendent of Missouri.
- Clyde R. Conner, guard for Mississippi, was a prominent lawyer of Hattiesburg, Mississippi, and once United States Commissioner.
- Sam Costen, quarterback for Vanderbilt who once coached The Citadel Bulldogs. He was also an attorney.
- Honus Craig, halfback for Vanderbilt, Dan McGugin once called him the South's greatest athlete and Vanderbilt's greatest halfback. One report says "When Craig was confronted with the above formidable title yesterday by a reporter whose business it is to know such things, he blushed like a girl and tried to show why Dan McGugin's judgment is not always to be trusted." In Craig's opinion, Bob Blake was the South's greatest player.
- Owsley Manier, fullback for Vanderbilt, unanimous selection, a "great plunging back," selected third-team All-America by Walter Camp. Manier scored five touchdowns against Alabama in a 78-0 victory and again ran for five touchdowns over Georgia Tech (37-6) in Atlanta. Manier was later an assistant coach and practicing physician.
- Joe Pritchard, tackle for Vanderbilt, unanimous selection, coached one year at LSU and was a Presbyterian dental missionary at Luebo in the Congo.
- Lex Stone, tackle for Sewanee, coached football and basketball at the University of Tennessee. He was the school's first basketball coach.
- Stein Stone, center for Vanderbilt, an all-time great at Vanderbilt who coached football one year at Clemson. He was an engineer.

== All-Southerns of 1906 ==
=== Ends ===
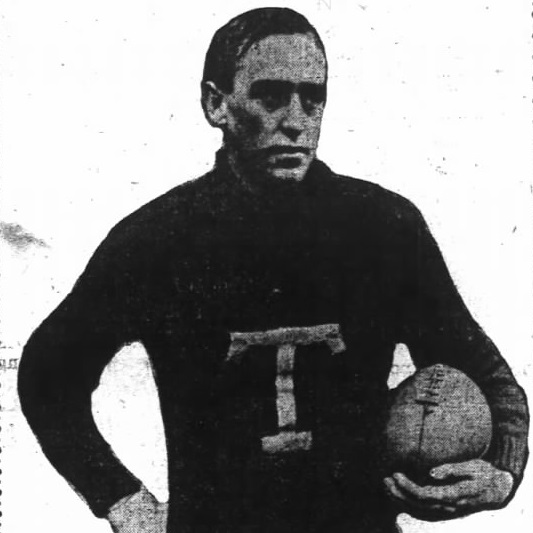
Lob Brown

- Bob Blake†, Vanderbilt (C, AWL, WP, MT, MCA, PW, DM)
- Lob Brown, Georgia Tech (C, AWL, MT, PW)
- Charlie Bagley, Washington & Lee (WP)
- Arthur Wilson, North Carolina A&M (WP [as t])
- Frank Shipp, Sewanee (DM)
- Hope Sadler, Clemson (F)

=== Tackles ===
- Joe Pritchard†, Vanderbilt (C, AWL, WP, MT, MCA, PW, DM)
- Lex Stone, Sewanee (C, MCA [as e], PW, DM)
- Edwin Noel, Vanderbilt (AWL, MT)

=== Guards ===
- Walter K. Chorn, Vanderbilt (C, AWL, MT, MCA, PW, DM)
- Clyde Conner, Mississippi (C, MCA [as c], PW)
- Fatty McLain, Vanderbilt (AWL, MT)
- George Watkins, Sewanee (WP)
- Hoss Hodgson, Georgetown (WP)
- James C. Elmer, Mississippi (MCA)
- Puss Derrick, Clemson (DM, F)

=== Centers ===
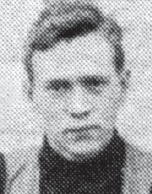
Stein Stone

- Stein Stone, Vanderbilt (C, AWL, WP, MCA [as t], PW, DM)
- Grover Ketron, Georgia (MT, F)

=== Quarterbacks ===
- Sam Costen, Vanderbilt (C, AWL, MT, MCA, PW, DM)
- Oscar Randolph, Virginia (WP)

=== Halfbacks ===
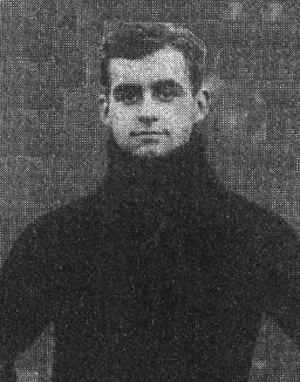
Owsley Manier

- Dan Blake†, Vanderbilt (C, AWL, MT, MCA, PW, DM)
- Honus Craig, Vanderbilt (C, MCA, PW, DM)
- Hammond Johnson, Virginia (WP, MT)
- Fritz Furtick, Clemson (AWL)
- Speedy Kerr, Georgetown (WP)

=== Fullbacks ===
- Owsley Manier†, Vanderbilt (C, AWL, WP, MT, MCA, PW, DM)
- Hogan Yancey, Transylania (F)

== Key ==
Bold = Consensus selection

† = Unanimous selection

C = selected by consensus of newspapers, as published in Fuzzy Woodruff's A History of Southern Football 1890-1928.

AWL = selected by A. W. Lynn, sporting editor for the Atlanta Constitution.

WP = selected by The Washington Post.

MT = selected by the Macon Telegraph

MCA = selected by former Tennessee player Nash Buckingham in the Memphis Commercial Appeal.

PW = selected by Percy Whiting of Illustrated Outdoor News.

DM = selected by Dan McGugin head coach at Vanderbilt University, with information from Bradley Walker, southern official.

F = selected by Jack Forsythe for a game in Savannah on Christmas.

== See also ==
- 1906 College Football All-America Team
