= 1906 Clemson Tigers football team =

American college football season

1906 Clemson Tigers football
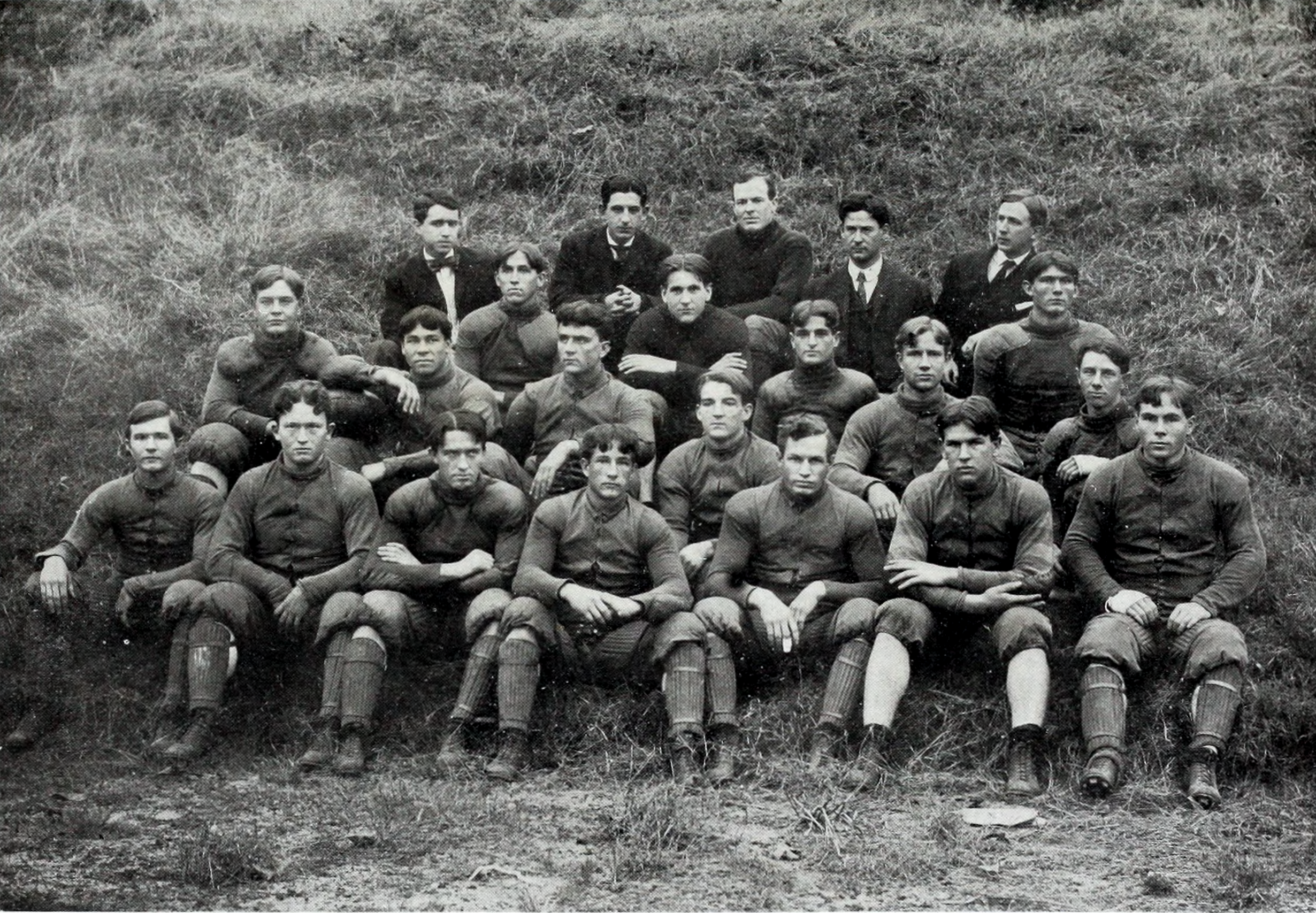

SIAA co-champion
- Conference: Southern Intercollegiate Athletic Association
- Record: 4–0–3 (4–0 SIAA)
- Head coach: Bob Williams (1st season)
- Captain: Fritz Furtick
- Home stadium: Bowman Field

1906 Southern Intercollegiate Athletic Association football standings
	Conf.					Overall
Team	W		L		T	W		L		T
Vanderbilt +	4	–	0	–	0	8	–	1	–	0
Clemson +	4	–	0	–	0	4	–	0	–	3
Sewanee	5	–	1	–	0	8	–	1	–	0
Alabama	3	–	1	–	0	5	–	1	–	0
Ole Miss	3	–	2	–	0	4	–	2	–	0
Georgia Tech	3	–	3	–	0	6	–	3	–	1
Georgia	2	–	2	–	1	2	–	4	–	1
LSU	0	–	1	–	1	2	–	2	–	2
Mississippi A&M	0	–	2	–	1	2	–	2	–	1
Tennessee	0	–	3	–	1	1	–	6	–	2
Mercer	0	–	2	–	0	1	–	4	–	0
Tulane	0	–	2	–	0	0	–	4	–	1
Auburn	0	–	5	–	0	1	–	5	–	1
Cumberland (TN)			–					–
Nashville			–					–
+ – Conference co-champions

The 1906 Clemson Tigers football team represented Clemson Agricultural College—now known as Clemson University—during the 1906 Southern Intercollegiate Athletic Association football season. Under first-year head coach Bob Williams, the team posted a 4–0–3 overall record with a mark of 4–0 in SIAA play. Fritz Furtick was the team captain.

Heralding one of the best defenses in the South for the season, the Tigers allowed no touchdowns scored by their opponents in seven games, and only four points scored overall. The team tied with Vanderbilt for the SIAA title, but few writers chose them over the vaunted Commodores.

== Schedule ==
Date	Opponent	Site	Result	Attendance	Source
October 13	VPI*	Bowman Field; Calhoun, SC	T 0–0		
October 20	Georgia	Bowman Field; Calhoun, SC (rivalry)	W 6–0		
October 25	vs. North Carolina A&M*	State Fairgrounds; Columbia, SC (rivalry)	T 0–0	5,000	
November 3	vs. Davidson*	Latta Park; Charlotte, NC	T 0–0		
November 10	Auburn	Bowman Field; Calhoun, SC (rivalry)	W 6–4		
November 19	Tennessee	Bowman Field; Calhoun, SC	W 16–0		
November 29	at Georgia Tech	The Flats; Atlanta, GA (rivalry)	W 10–0		
*Non-conference game

== Games summaries ==
=== Davidson ===
In Davidson, Clemson had its third scoreless tie of the season.

=== Georgia Tech ===
Clemson closed the season with a 10–0 victory over John Heisman's Georgia Tech team. Fritz Furtick scored Clemson's first touchdown. An onside kick got the second.

Clemson's first forward pass took place during the game. Left end Powell Lykes, dropped back to kick, but lobbed a 30-yard pass to George Warren instead. Baseball star Ty Cobb attended the game.

The starting line up was Coagman (left end), Lykes (left tackle), Gaston (left guard), Clark (center), Carter (right guard), McLaurin (right tackle), Coles (right end), Warren (quarterback), Allen (left halfback), Furtick (right halfback), Derrick (fullback).

== Players ==
=== Line ===
Player	Position	Games started	Hometown	Prep school	Height	Weight	Age
Bert Carter	right guard						
W. C. Clark	center						
Stricker Coles	right end						
R. T. Gaston	left tackle				5'8"	195	
Rastus Keel	left guard						
Powell Lykes	left end					180	
Mac McLaurin	right tackle				5'9"	190	

=== Backfield ===
Player	Position	Games started	Hometown	Prep school	Height	Weight	Age
Banks Allen	left halfback						
Puss Derrick	fullback		Chapin, South Carolina			195	
Fritz Furtick	right halfback		Sandy Run, South Carolina			170	
Doc McFadden	quarterback						

== Bibliography ==
- Woodruff, Fuzzy (1928). A History of Southern Football 1890–1928. Vol. 1.
- Bourret, Tim. "2010 Clemson Football Media Guide" (PDF). Clemson University. p. 202. Archived from the original (PDF) on November 12, 2012.
