= Furtick =

Furtick is a surname. Notable people with the surname include:

- Fritz Furtick (1882–1962), American football player
- Steven Furtick (born 1980), American Christian pastor and songwriter
