= 1906 Tennessee Volunteers football team =

American college football season

1906 Tennessee Volunteers football
- Conference: Southern Intercollegiate Athletic Association
- Record: 1–6–2 (0–3–1 SIAA)
- Head coach: James DePree (2nd season)
- Captain: E. B. Proctor
- Home stadium: Baker-Himel Park

1906 Southern Intercollegiate Athletic Association football standings
	Conf.					Overall
Team	W		L		T	W		L		T
Vanderbilt +	4	–	0	–	0	8	–	1	–	0
Clemson +	4	–	0	–	0	4	–	0	–	3
Sewanee	5	–	1	–	0	8	–	1	–	0
Alabama	3	–	1	–	0	5	–	1	–	0
Ole Miss	3	–	2	–	0	4	–	2	–	0
Georgia Tech	3	–	3	–	0	6	–	3	–	1
Georgia	2	–	2	–	1	2	–	4	–	1
LSU	0	–	1	–	1	2	–	2	–	2
Mississippi A&M	0	–	2	–	1	2	–	2	–	1
Tennessee	0	–	3	–	1	1	–	6	–	2
Mercer	0	–	2	–	0	1	–	4	–	0
Tulane	0	–	2	–	0	0	–	4	–	1
Auburn	0	–	5	–	0	1	–	5	–	1
Cumberland (TN)			–					–
Nashville			–					–
+ – Conference co-champions

The 1906 Tennessee Volunteers football team represented the University of Tennessee in the 1906 college football season. James DePree served his second and final season as head coach at Tennessee. Roscoe Word, a three-time captain for the Volunteers, became the team's first assistant coach.

== Schedule ==
Date	Opponent	Site	Result	Source
October 6	American Temperance*	Baker-Himel Park; Knoxville, TN	W 10–0	
October 13	Maryville (TN)*	Baker-Himel Park; Knoxville, TN	L 0–11	
October 20	Central (KY)*	Baker-Himel Park; Knoxville, TN	L 0–6	
October 25	at American Temperance*	Harriman, TN	T 5–5	
November 3	Sewanee	Baker-Himel Park; Knoxville, TN	L 0–17	
November 10	at Kentucky State College*	Lexington, KY (rivalry)	L 0–21	
November 19	at Clemson	Bowman Field; Clemson, SC	L 0–16	
November 21	at Georgia	Herty Field; Athens, GA (rivalry)	T 0–0	
November 29	at Alabama	Birmingham Fairgrounds; Birmingham, AL (rivalry)	L 0–51	
*Non-conference game
