= R. T. Gaston =

American football player

Profile
- Positions: Tackle, Guard

Personal information
- Born: c. 1888; South Carolina
- Listed height: 5 ft 8 in (1.73 m)
- Listed weight: 198 lb (90 kg)

Career information
- College: Clemson (1906–1907)

Awards and highlights
- All-Southern (1907)

R. T. Gaston was a college football player. He was a prominent tackle for the Clemson Tigers of Clemson College, standing 5 feet 8 inches tall and weighing 198 pounds. Gaston was selected All-Southern in 1907, and played opposite another All-Southern tackle in Mac McLaurin.
