= Clyde R. Conner =

American football player and lawyer (1884–1919)

Clyde Conner
- Born: August 4, 1884; Macon, Mississippi, U.S.
- Died: January 24, 1919 (aged 34); Hattiesburg, Mississippi, U.S.
- Football career

Profile
- Position: Tackle/Guard/Center

Personal information
- Listed weight: 245 lb (111 kg)

Career information
- College: Ole Miss (1901–1903; 1906–1907); Virginia (1903)

Awards and highlights
- All-Southern (1903, 1906)

Clyde Raymond Conner (August 4, 1884 – January 24, 1919) was a college football player, prominent lawyer of Hattiesburg, Mississippi, and once United States Commissioner.

== College football ==
Conner was a prominent tackle for both the Ole Miss Rebels of the University of Mississippi and a prominent center for the Virginia Cavaliers of the University of Virginia.

=== Ole Miss ===
==== 1902 ====
In a 21 to 0 Egg Bowl victory, Conner "plunged through the line at will" according to the Memphis paper.

==== 1906 ====
He was selected All-Southern in 1906.

=== University of Virginia ===
==== 1903 ====
He was also selected All-Southern in 1903, the year he played with Virginia.

== Attorney ==
=== Death ===
Conner died at his home on January 24, 1919, of blood poisoning. While at a barber shop he had an inverted hair removed from his neck. No trouble resulted until two days later it became quite irritated.
