= 1906 Mississippi A&M Aggies football team =

American college football season

1906 Mississippi A&M Aggies football
- Conference: Southern Intercollegiate Athletic Association
- Record: 2–2–1 (0–2–1 SIAA)
- Head coach: Daniel S. Martin (4th season)
- Home stadium: Hardy Field

1906 Southern Intercollegiate Athletic Association football standings
	Conf.					Overall
Team	W		L		T	W		L		T
Vanderbilt +	4	–	0	–	0	8	–	1	–	0
Clemson +	4	–	0	–	0	4	–	0	–	3
Sewanee	5	–	1	–	0	8	–	1	–	0
Alabama	3	–	1	–	0	5	–	1	–	0
Ole Miss	3	–	2	–	0	4	–	2	–	0
Georgia Tech	3	–	3	–	0	6	–	3	–	1
Georgia	2	–	2	–	1	2	–	4	–	1
LSU	0	–	1	–	1	2	–	2	–	2
Mississippi A&M	0	–	2	–	1	2	–	2	–	1
Tennessee	0	–	3	–	1	1	–	6	–	2
Mercer	0	–	2	–	0	1	–	4	–	0
Tulane	0	–	2	–	0	0	–	4	–	1
Auburn	0	–	5	–	0	1	–	5	–	1
Cumberland (TN)			–					–
Nashville			–					–
+ – Conference co-champions

The 1906 Mississippi A&M Aggies football team represented The Agricultural and Mechanical College of the State of Mississippi (now known as Mississippi State University) as a member of the Southern Intercollegiate Athletic Association (SIAA) during the 1906 college football season. Led by Daniel S. Martin in his fourth and final season as head coach, the Aggies compiled an overall record of 2–2–1 with a mark of 0–2–1 in conference play.

== Schedule ==
Date	Opponent	Site	Result	Source
September 29	Howard (AL)*	Hardy Field; Starkville, MS	W 30–0	
October 13	Marion*	Hardy Field; Starkville, MS	W 62–0	
October 26	LSU	Columbus Fairgrounds; Columbus, MS	T 0–0	
November 3	Alabama	Hardy Field; Starkville, MS (rivalry)	L 4–16	
November 25	vs. Ole Miss	State Fairgrounds; Jackson, MS (rivalry)	L 5–29	
*Non-conference game
