= 1906 Georgia Tech Yellow Jackets football team =

American college football season

1906 Georgia Tech Yellow Jackets football
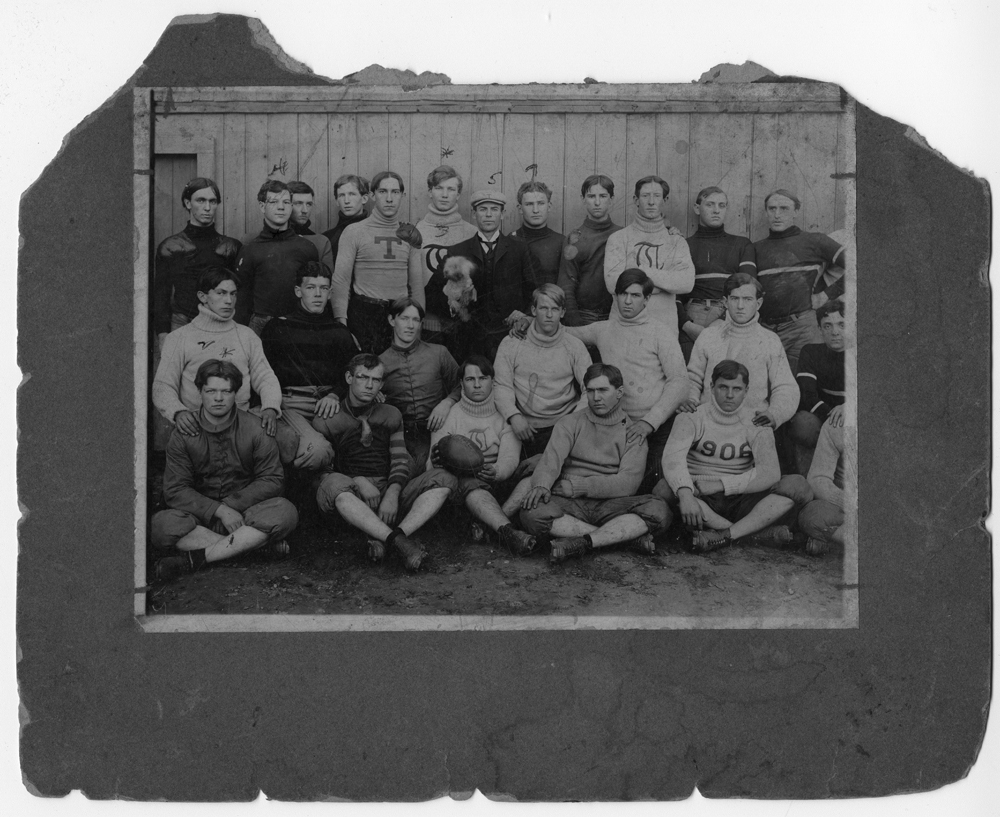
- Heisman is holding his pet dog "Woo".
- Conference: Southern Intercollegiate Athletic Association
- Record: 6–3–1 (4–3 SIAA)
- Head coach: John Heisman (3rd season)
- Captain: E. C. Davies
- Home stadium: The Flats

1906 Southern Intercollegiate Athletic Association football standings
	Conf.					Overall
Team	W		L		T	W		L		T
Vanderbilt +	4	–	0	–	0	8	–	1	–	0
Clemson +	4	–	0	–	0	4	–	0	–	3
Sewanee	5	–	1	–	0	8	–	1	–	0
Alabama	3	–	1	–	0	5	–	1	–	0
Ole Miss	3	–	2	–	0	4	–	2	–	0
Georgia Tech	3	–	3	–	0	6	–	3	–	1
Georgia	2	–	2	–	1	2	–	4	–	1
LSU	0	–	1	–	1	2	–	2	–	2
Mississippi A&M	0	–	2	–	1	2	–	2	–	1
Tennessee	0	–	3	–	1	1	–	6	–	2
Mercer	0	–	2	–	0	1	–	4	–	0
Tulane	0	–	2	–	0	0	–	4	–	1
Auburn	0	–	5	–	0	1	–	5	–	1
Cumberland (TN)			–					–
Nashville			–					–
+ – Conference co-champions

The 1906 Georgia Tech Yellow Jackets football team represented the Georgia Institute of Technology during the 1906 Southern Intercollegiate Athletic Association football season. In the third season under coach John Heisman, Georgia Tech posted a 6–3–1 record.

== Before the season ==
In no small part thanks to Heisman, the forward pass was legalized in 1906.

== Schedule ==
Date	Opponent	Site	Result	Source
September 29	Maryville (TN)*	The Flats; Atlanta, GA	T 6–6	
October 6	North Georgia*	The Flats; Atlanta, GA	W 11–0	
October 13	Grant*	The Flats; Atlanta, GA	W 18–0	
October 20	Sewanee	The Flats; Atlanta, GA	L 0–16	
October 27	Davidson	The Flats; Atlanta, GA	W 4–0	
November 3	Auburn	The Flats; Atlanta, GA (rivalry)	W 11–0	
November 10	Georgia	The Flats; Atlanta, GA (rivalry)	W 17–0	
November 17	Vanderbilt	The Flats; Atlanta, GA (rivalry)	L 6–37	
November 24	at Mercer	Central City Park; Macon, GA	W 61–0	
November 29	Clemson	The Flats; Atlanta, GA (rivalry)	L 0–10	
*Non-conference game

== Game summaries ==
=== Maryville ===
Maryville at Georgia Tech

Team	1	2	Total
Maryville	0	6	6
Ga Tech	0	6	6

- Location: The Flats • Atlanta, GA
- Referee: O'Donnell

Under the new rules, Maryville surprised Tech with a tie, 6–6.

The starting lineup was: Hightower (left end), Munroe (left tackle), Bell (left guard), Luck (center), Henderson (right guard), McCarty (right tackle), Hill (right end), Robert (quarterback), Davids (left halfback), Means (right halfback), Sweet (fullback).

=== North Georgia ===
In the second week of play, Tech defeated North Georgia 11–0.

=== Grant ===
Against Grant, Tech won 18–0. The game proved a punting duel between Brown and Grant's Reupert. The highlight of the game was a 40-yard punt return for a touchdown by Tech's Hightower.

=== Sewanee ===
Sewanee defeated Georgia Tech 16–0. The game's account is the first involving the jump shift. The starting lineup was Brown (left end), Luck (left tackle), Bell (left guard), Munroe (center), Smith (right guard), McCarty (right tackle), Hill (right end), Robert (quarterback), Hightower (left halfback), Davies (right halfback), Sweet (fullback).

=== Davidson ===
Davidson at Georgia Tech

Team	1	2	Total
Davidson	0	0	0
• Ga Tech	4	0	4

- Location: The Flats • Atlanta, GA

Lob Brown was responsible for the win over Davidson by a 40-yard field goal.

=== Auburn ===
Brown also helped in the victory over rival Auburn, the school's first.

=== Georgia ===
"Tech's cup of joy overflowed" as they defeated rival Georgia 17–0. An ambitious game with Vanderbilt was scheduled.

=== Vanderbilt ===
Vanderbilt at Georgia Tech

Team	1	2	Total
• Vanderbilt	23	14	37
Ga Tech	0	6	6

- Date: November 17
- Location: The Flats • Atlanta, GA
- Game attendance: 5,000
- Referee: Bradley Walker

Vanderbilt defeated Tech in the rain and mud of Atlanta 37–6. Lobster Brown scored Tech's points. Atlanta Constitution sportswriter Alex Lynn wrote after the game that Owsley Manier was: "the greatest fullback and all round man ever seen in Atlanta." He again scored five touchdowns.

The starting lineup was: Brown (left end); McCarty (left tackle); Snyder (left guard); Munroe (center); Henderson (right guard); Luck (right tackle); Brown (right end); Robert (quarterback); Davies (left halfback); Hightower (right halfback); Adamson (fullback).

=== Mercer ===
The season's largest win came over Mercer, 61–0.

=== Clemson ===
The season ended with a disappointing, 10–0 loss to Clemson. Fritz Furtick scored Clemson's first touchdown. Baseball star Ty Cobb attended the game.

== Postseason ==
At season's end, Brown was elected captain for next season.
