= Faulkinberry =

Faulkinberry is a surname. Notable people with the surname include:

- Frank Faulkinberry (1887–1933), American football, basketball, and baseball player and coach
- Russ Faulkinberry (1928–2005), American football player and coach
