= 1906 Sewanee Tigers football team =

American college football season

1906 Sewanee Tigers football
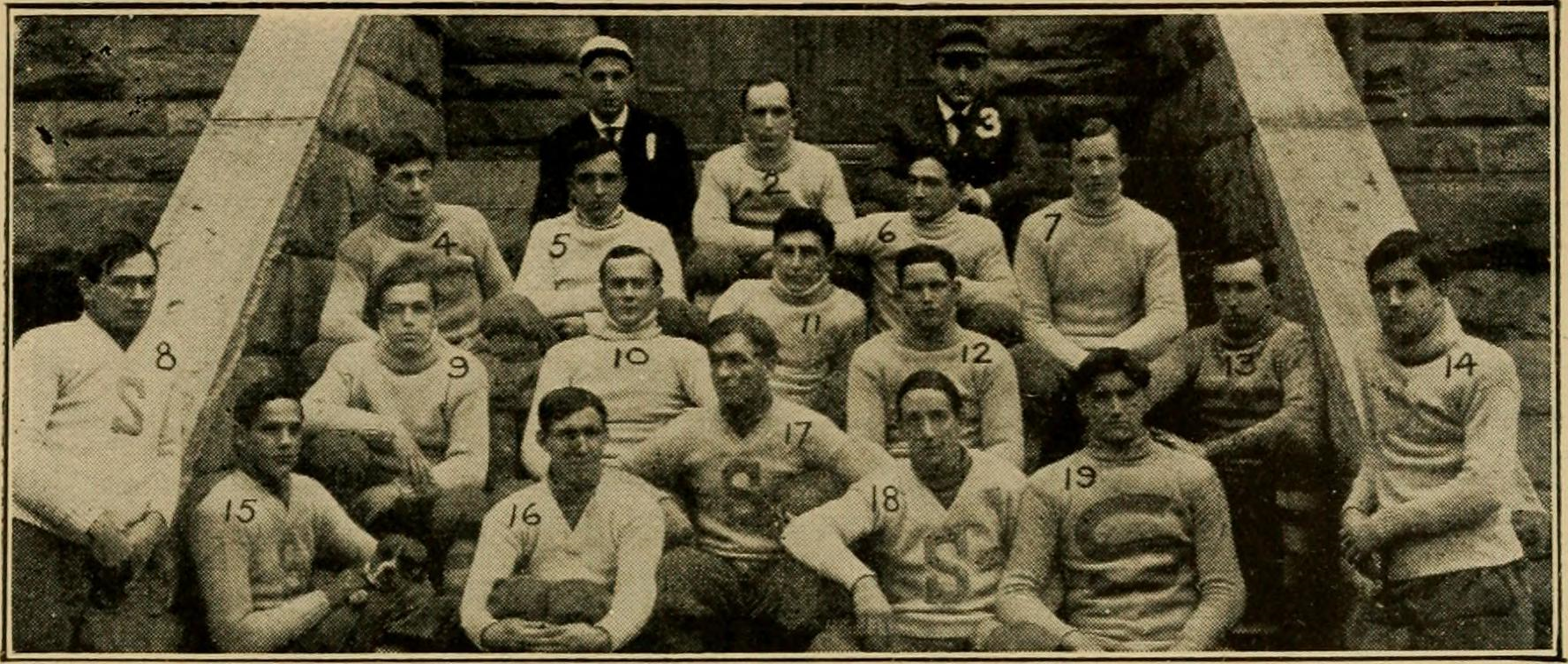
- Conference: Southern Intercollegiate Athletic Association
- Record: 8–1 (5–1 SIAA)
- Head coach: James John Quill (1st season)
- Captain: George Watkins
- Home stadium: Hardee Field

1906 Southern Intercollegiate Athletic Association football standings
	Conf.					Overall
Team	W		L		T	W		L		T
Vanderbilt +	4	–	0	–	0	8	–	1	–	0
Clemson +	4	–	0	–	0	4	–	0	–	3
Sewanee	5	–	1	–	0	8	–	1	–	0
Alabama	3	–	1	–	0	5	–	1	–	0
Ole Miss	3	–	2	–	0	4	–	2	–	0
Georgia Tech	3	–	3	–	0	6	–	3	–	1
Georgia	2	–	2	–	1	2	–	4	–	1
LSU	0	–	1	–	1	2	–	2	–	2
Mississippi A&M	0	–	2	–	1	2	–	2	–	1
Tennessee	0	–	3	–	1	1	–	6	–	2
Mercer	0	–	2	–	0	1	–	4	–	0
Tulane	0	–	2	–	0	0	–	4	–	1
Auburn	0	–	5	–	0	1	–	5	–	1
Cumberland (TN)			–					–
Nashville			–					–
+ – Conference co-champions

The 1906 Sewanee Tigers football team represented Sewanee: The University of the South as a member of the Southern Intercollegiate Athletic Association (SIAA) during the 1906 college football season. Led by first-year head coach James John Quill, the Tigers compiled an overall record of 8–1, with a mark of 5–1 in conference play.

== Schedule ==
Date	Opponent	Site	Result	Attendance	Source
September 29	Mooney*	Hardee Field; Sewanee, TN	W 24–0		
October 12	Southwestern Presbyterian*	Hardee Field; Sewanee, TN (rivalry)	W 57–0		
October 20	at Georgia Tech	The Flats; Atlanta, GA	W 16–0		
October 26	at Auburn	West End Park; Birmingham, AL	W 10–5		
November 3	at Tennessee	Baker-Himel Park; Knoxville, TN	W 17–0		
November 10	at Tulane	Athletic Park; New Orleans, LA	W 35–0		
November 12	vs. Ole Miss	Red Elm Park; Memphis, TN	W 24–0		
November 20	Maryville (TN)*	Hardee Field; Sewanee, TN	W 28–0		
November 29	at Vanderbilt	Dudley Field; Nashville, TN (rivalry)	L 0–20	6,000	
*Non-conference game
