= 1906 Tulane Olive and Blue football team =

American college football season

1906 Tulane Olive and Blue football
- Conference: Southern Intercollegiate Athletic Association
- Record: 0–4–1 (0–3 SIAA)
- Head coach: John Russ (1st season)
- Captain: James Connelly
- Home stadium: Athletic Park

1906 Southern Intercollegiate Athletic Association football standings
	Conf.					Overall
Team	W		L		T	W		L		T
Vanderbilt +	4	–	0	–	0	8	–	1	–	0
Clemson +	4	–	0	–	0	4	–	0	–	3
Sewanee	5	–	1	–	0	8	–	1	–	0
Alabama	3	–	1	–	0	5	–	1	–	0
Ole Miss	3	–	2	–	0	4	–	2	–	0
Georgia Tech	3	–	3	–	0	6	–	3	–	1
Georgia	2	–	2	–	1	2	–	4	–	1
LSU	0	–	1	–	1	2	–	2	–	2
Mississippi A&M	0	–	2	–	1	2	–	2	–	1
Tennessee	0	–	3	–	1	1	–	6	–	2
Mercer	0	–	2	–	0	1	–	4	–	0
Tulane	0	–	2	–	0	0	–	4	–	1
Auburn	0	–	5	–	0	1	–	5	–	1
Cumberland (TN)			–					–
Nashville			–					–
+ – Conference co-champions

The 1906 Tulane Olive and Blue football team was an American football team that represented Tulane University as a member of the Southern Intercollegiate Athletic Association (SIAA) during the 1906 college football season. In their first year under head coach John Russ, the team compiled an overall record of 0–4–1 with a mark of 0–3 in conference play.

== Schedule ==
Date	Opponent	Site	Result	Source
October 27	Howard (AL)*	Athletic Park; New Orleans, LA	T 0–0	
November 3	Ole Miss	Athletic Park; New Orleans, LA (rivalry)	L 0–17	
November 10	Sewanee	Athletic Park; New Orleans, LA	L 0–35	
November 17	Texas A&M	Athletic Park; New Orleans, LA	L 0–18	
November 24	Arkansas*	Athletic Park; New Orleans, LA	L 0–22	
*Non-conference game
