= 1906 Mercer Baptists football team =

American college football season

1906 Mercer Baptists football
- Conference: Southern Intercollegiate Athletic Association
- Record: 1–4 (0–2 SIAA)
- Head coach: E. E. Tarr (1st season)
- Home stadium: Central City Park

1906 Southern Intercollegiate Athletic Association football standings
	Conf.					Overall
Team	W		L		T	W		L		T
Vanderbilt +	4	–	0	–	0	8	–	1	–	0
Clemson +	4	–	0	–	0	4	–	0	–	3
Sewanee	5	–	1	–	0	8	–	1	–	0
Alabama	3	–	1	–	0	5	–	1	–	0
Ole Miss	3	–	2	–	0	4	–	2	–	0
Georgia Tech	3	–	3	–	0	6	–	3	–	1
Georgia	2	–	2	–	1	2	–	4	–	1
LSU	0	–	1	–	1	2	–	2	–	2
Mississippi A&M	0	–	2	–	1	2	–	2	–	1
Tennessee	0	–	3	–	1	1	–	6	–	2
Mercer	0	–	2	–	0	1	–	4	–	0
Tulane	0	–	2	–	0	0	–	4	–	1
Auburn	0	–	5	–	0	1	–	5	–	1
Cumberland (TN)			–					–
Nashville			–					–
+ – Conference co-champions

The 1906 Mercer Baptists football team represented Mercer University in the 1906 Southern Intercollegiate Athletic Association football season. Led by E. E. Tarr in his first and only season as head coach, Mercer compiled san overall record of 1–4 with a mark of 0–2 in SIAA play.

== Schedule ==
Date	Opponent	Site	Result	Source
October 8	at Gordon (GA)*	Barnesville, GA	L 5–28	
October 20	Florida*	Central City Park; Macon, GA	W 12–0	
November 3	Georgia	Central City Park; Macon, GA	L 0–55	
November 10	at The Citadel*	Hampton Park; Charleston, SC	L 0–10	
November 24	Georgia Tech	Central City Park; Macon, GA	L 0–61	
*Non-conference game
