= 1906 Carlisle vs. Vanderbilt football game =

1906 Carlisle Indians vs. Vanderbilt Commodores football game
Carlisle Indians	Vanderbilt Commodores
(8–2)	(6–1)
0	4
Head coach: Bemus Pierce	Head coach: Dan McGugin
	1	2	Total
Carlisle	0	0	0
Vanderbilt	4	0	4
- Date: November 22, 1906
- Season: 1906
- Stadium: Dudley Field
- Location: Nashville, Tennessee
- Referee: Mike Thompson

The 1906 Carlisle vs. Vanderbilt football game, played November 22, 1906, was a college football game between the Carlisle Indians and Vanderbilt Commodores. Vanderbilt defeated the northern school by a single, 17-yard Bob Blake field goal, Vanderbilt coach Dan McGugin described the win as "the crowning feat of the Southern Intercollegiate Athletic Association season." The 1906 Vanderbilt team had one of the greatest seasons in school history, once rated by Innis Brown as the best the South ever had.

== Background ==
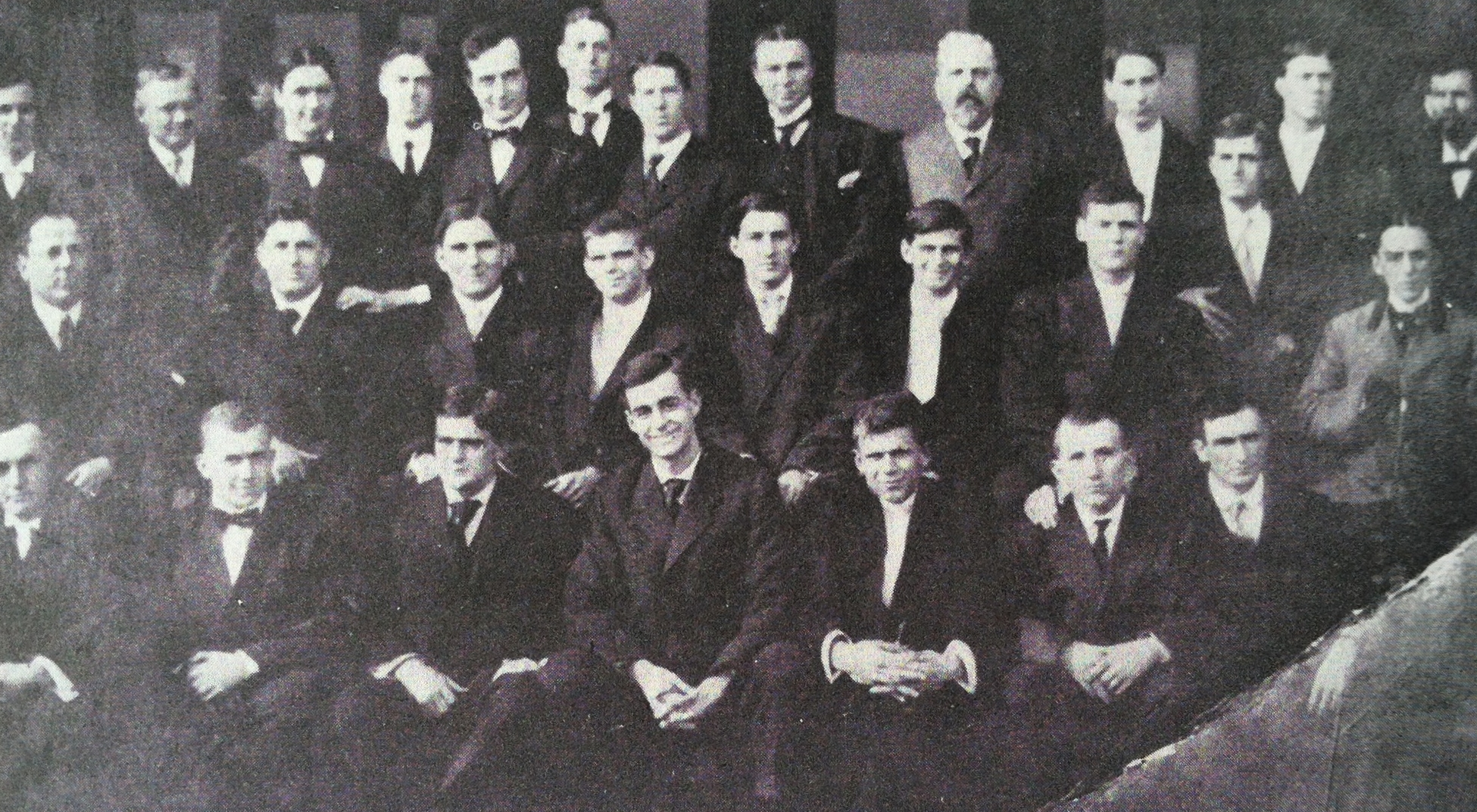
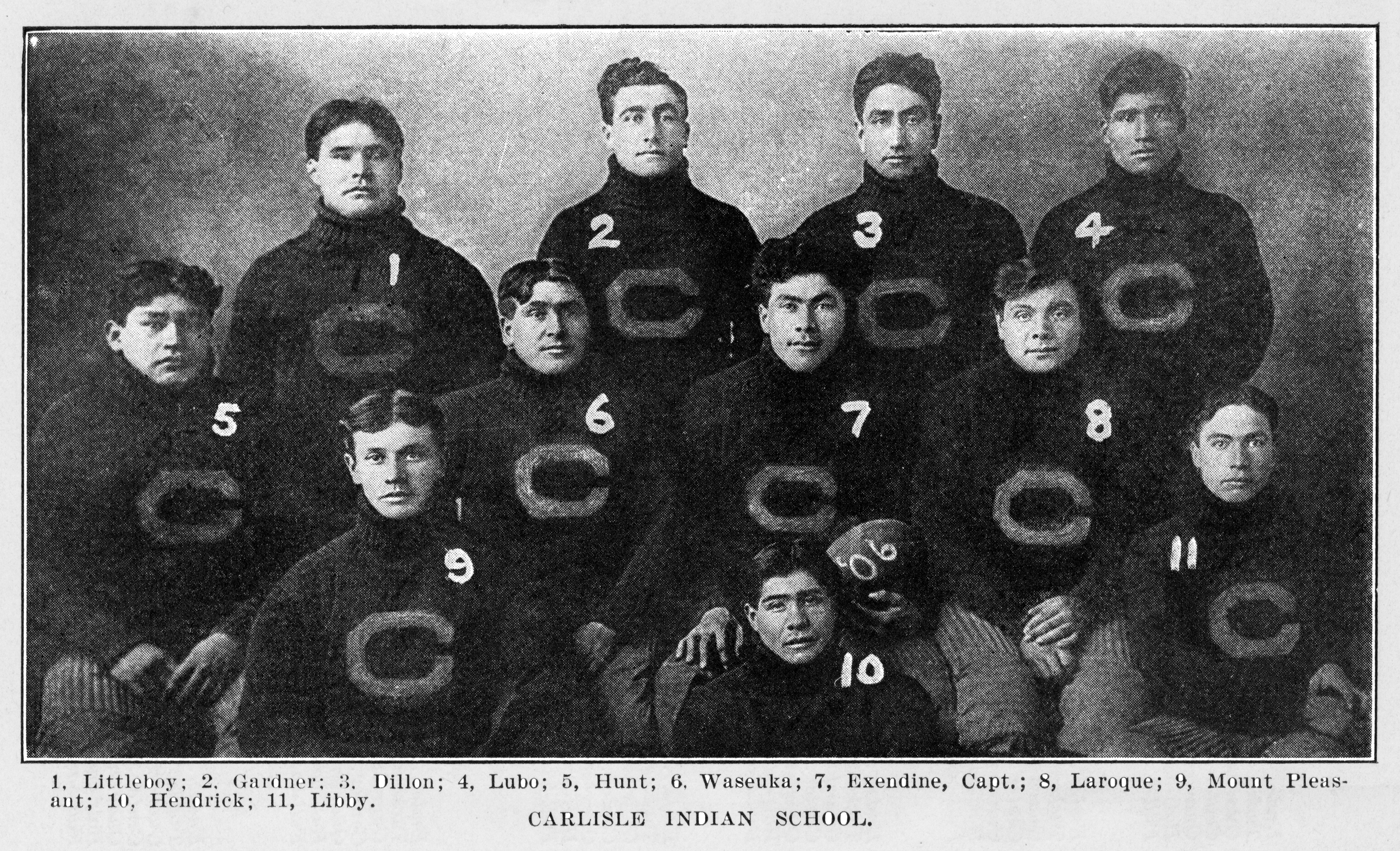
Vanderbilt players (left) and Carlisle team of 1906

On November 11, Vanderbilt accepted a challenge of the Carlisle team for a game in Nashville. The Indians were given the choice of November 22, 23, or 24. The Nashville Banner predicted it would be "the greatest game the south ever saw." The game started forty-five minutes late to accommodate the large crowd.

One source claims the Carlisle Indians failed to receive supplies on the trip to Nashville, including their receiving carboys emptied of water. "The Indians had the poorest kind of accommodations at Nashville, and on account of the change of water every one of them became ill."

== Game summary ==
Frank Mount Pleasant had four field goal attempts, but missed them all. John Heisman wrote "Manier bucked the Indians' line. Costen handled the ball surely and well downed Mt. Pleasant in his tracks on most of Blake's punts...I am still convinced that outside Yale and Princeton, the Commodores would have an even break with any other team in the country."

== Aftermath ==
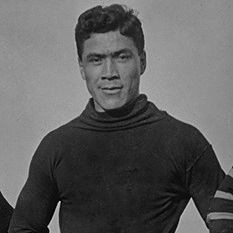
Albert Exendine was described as "the fastest end ever seen"

Atlanta Constitution sporting editor A. W. Lynn wrote "The general surprises are numerous enough, but the largest particular one was the Commodore–Indian contest, when Vanderbilt took off the greatest honors ever falling to the lot of a southern football team in the hardest battle ever fought on a southern gridiron. Edwin Pope's Football's Greatest Coaches describes the game as the first intersectional triumph of the south. Vanderbilt running back Honus Craig called this his hardest game, giving special praise to Albert Exendine as "the fastest end I ever saw."

== Players ==
The starting lineup for Vanderbilt was V. Blake (left end); Pritchard (left tackle); McLain (left guard); Stone (center); Chorn (right guard); E. Noel (right tackle); B. Blake (right end); Costen (quarterback); D. Blake (left halfback); Craig (right halfback); Manier (fullback).
