= James John Quill =

American football player and coach, lawyer (c. 1882 – 1918)

Biographical details
- Born: c. 1882
- Died: March 8, 1918 (aged 35); Battle Creek, Michigan, U.S.
- Education: Yale Law School (JD, 1906)

Playing career
- 1902–1903: Amherst
- 1905: Yale

Coaching career (HC unless noted)
- 1906: Sewanee

Head coaching record
- Overall: 8–1

James John Quill (c. 1882 – March 8, 1918) was an American lawyer and college football player and coach. He was a graduate of both Amherst College in Amherst, Massachusetts and the Yale Law School. Quill's hit on Francis Burr in the 1905 Harvard–Yale football game was a catalyst for major reforms in the game of college football. He served as the head football coach at Sewanee: The University of the South in 1906, compiling a record of 8–1.

In 1918, Quill was working as the clerk of the grand jury system in Hudson County, New Jersey. In early March of that year, he went to Battle Creek, Michigan to treat a kidney ailment. He died on March 8, 1918, in Battle Creek, at the age of 35.

== Head coaching record ==
Year	Team	Overall	Conference	Standing	Bowl/playoffs
Sewanee Tigers (Southern Intercollegiate Athletic Association) (1906)
1906	Sewanee	8–1	5–1	3rd	
Sewanee:		8–1	5–1		
Total:		8–1			
