= J. R. Davis =

American football player (1882–1947)

Profile
- Positions: Tackle, halfback

Personal information
- Born: June 12, 1882; Williamsburg, Virginia, U.S.
- Died: August 16, 1947 (aged 65); Harriman, Tennessee, U.S.
- Listed height: 5 ft 10 in (1.78 m)
- Listed weight: 200 lb (91 kg)

Career information
- High school: American University
- College: Georgia Tech (1907–1909)

Awards and highlights
- All-Southern (1907, 1908); Tech Athletic Hall of Fame

John Ryland "Twenty Percent" Davis (June 12, 1882 – August 16, 1947) was an American college football player. Davis was known as "Twenty percent" because he was considered twenty percent of the team's worth.

== Georgia Tech ==
Davis was a tackle and halfback for John Heisman's Georgia Tech Golden Tornado of the Georgia Institute of Technology. He was inducted into the Tech Athletic Hall of Fame in 1958. The large Davis carried the bass drum on his back in a parade through Griffin, Georgia for the Georgia Tech Glee Club. In 1915, John Heisman selected his 30 greatest Southern football players, and mentioned Davis 20th.

=== 1908 ===
Davis was selected All-Southern in 1908. Vanderbilt coach Dan McGugin wrote, "He has one glaring fault—a tendency to tackle around the eyebrows. Otherwise he is a splendid foot ball man. He weighs two hundred pounds, is never hurt, never fumbles, bucks a line hard and furnishes excellent interference. He was the strength and stay of Tech."

=== 1909 ===
He was captain of the 1909 team.
