= 1906 LSU Tigers football team =

American college football season

1906 LSU Tigers football
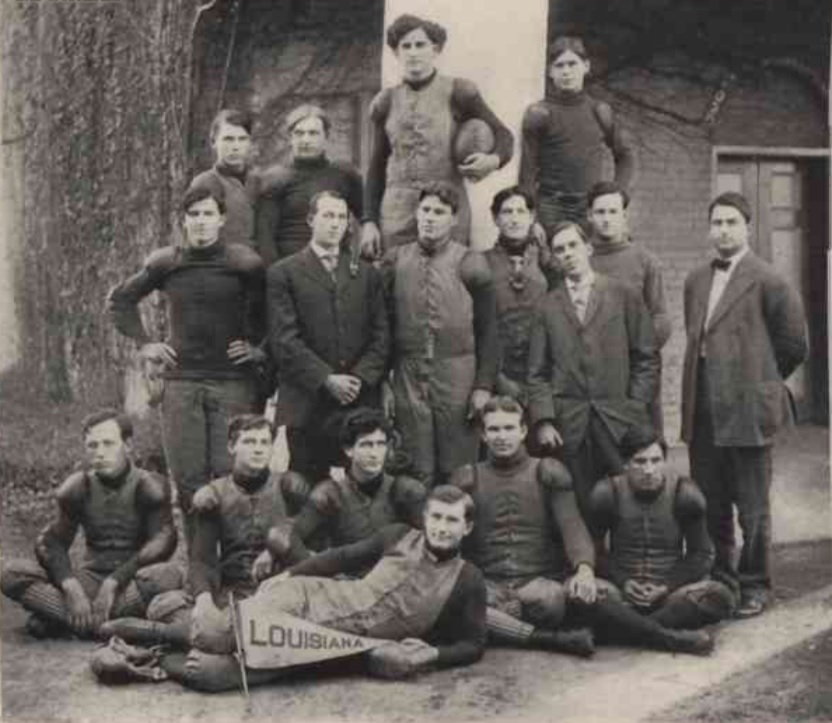
- Conference: Southern Intercollegiate Athletic Association
- Record: 2–2–2 (0–2–1 SIAA)
- Head coach: Dan A. Killian (3rd season)
- Captain: E. E. Weil
- Home stadium: State Field

1906 Southern Intercollegiate Athletic Association football standings
	Conf.					Overall
Team	W		L		T	W		L		T
Vanderbilt +	4	–	0	–	0	8	–	1	–	0
Clemson +	4	–	0	–	0	4	–	0	–	3
Sewanee	5	–	1	–	0	8	–	1	–	0
Alabama	3	–	1	–	0	5	–	1	–	0
Ole Miss	3	–	2	–	0	4	–	2	–	0
Georgia Tech	3	–	3	–	0	6	–	3	–	1
Georgia	2	–	2	–	1	2	–	4	–	1
LSU	0	–	1	–	1	2	–	2	–	2
Mississippi A&M	0	–	2	–	1	2	–	2	–	1
Tennessee	0	–	3	–	1	1	–	6	–	2
Mercer	0	–	2	–	0	1	–	4	–	0
Tulane	0	–	2	–	0	0	–	4	–	1
Auburn	0	–	5	–	0	1	–	5	–	1
Cumberland (TN)			–					–
Nashville			–					–
+ – Conference co-champions

The 1906 LSU Tigers football team represented Louisiana State University (LSU) as a member of the Southern Intercollegiate Athletic Association (SIAA) during the 1906 college football season. Led by third-year head coach Dan A. Killian, the Tigers compiled an overall record of 2–2–2, with a mark of 0–2–1 in conference play.

== Schedule ==
Date	Time	Opponent	Site	Result	Source
October 10		Monroe Athletic Club*	State Field; Baton Rouge, LA	W 5–0	
October 20		Ole Miss	State Field; Baton Rouge, LA (rivalry)	L 0–9	
October 27		vs. Mississippi A&M	Columbus Fairgrounds; Columbus, MS (rivalry)	T 0–0	
November 9		Louisiana Industrial*	State Field; Baton Rouge, LA	W 17–0	
November 19		Texas A&M	State Field; Baton Rouge, LA (rivalry)	L 12–22	
November 29	3:30 p.m.	Arkansas*	State Field; Baton Rouge, LA (rivalry)	T 6–6	
*Non-conference game
