= Walter K. Chorn =

American lawyer

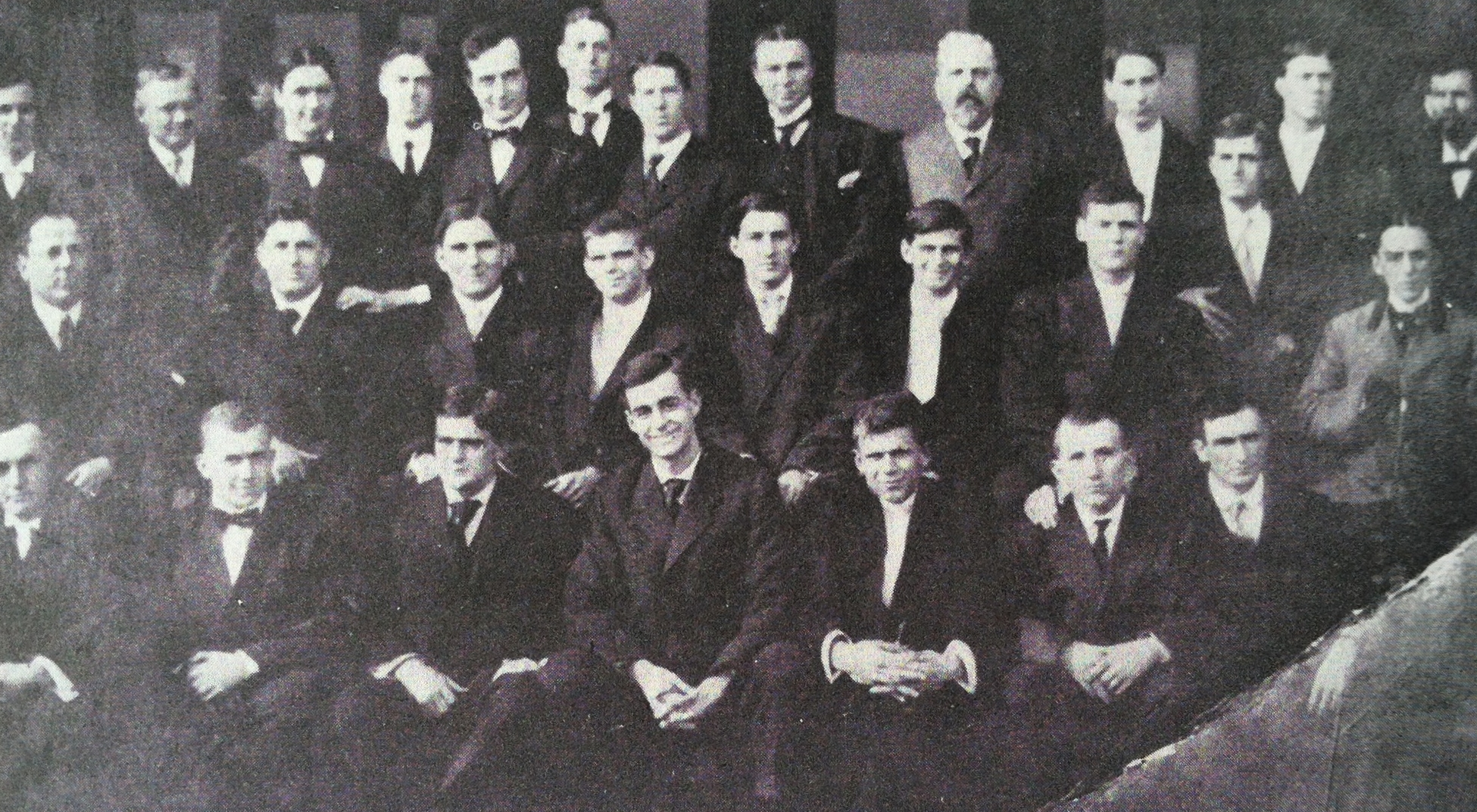

Vanderbilt Commodores
- Position: Guard
- Class: Graduate

Personal information
- Born: January 21, 1885; Howard County, Missouri, U.S.
- Died: February 26, 1933 (aged 48); Kansas City, Missouri, U.S.
- Listed weight: 170 lb (77 kg)

Career information
- College: Vanderbilt (1906)

Awards and highlights
- SIAA championship (1906); All-Southern (1906); 1912 All-time Vandy second team

Walter Knaus Chorn (January 21, 1885 – February 26, 1933) was an American college football player and coach, lawyer, and one time insurance superintendent of Missouri.

== University ==
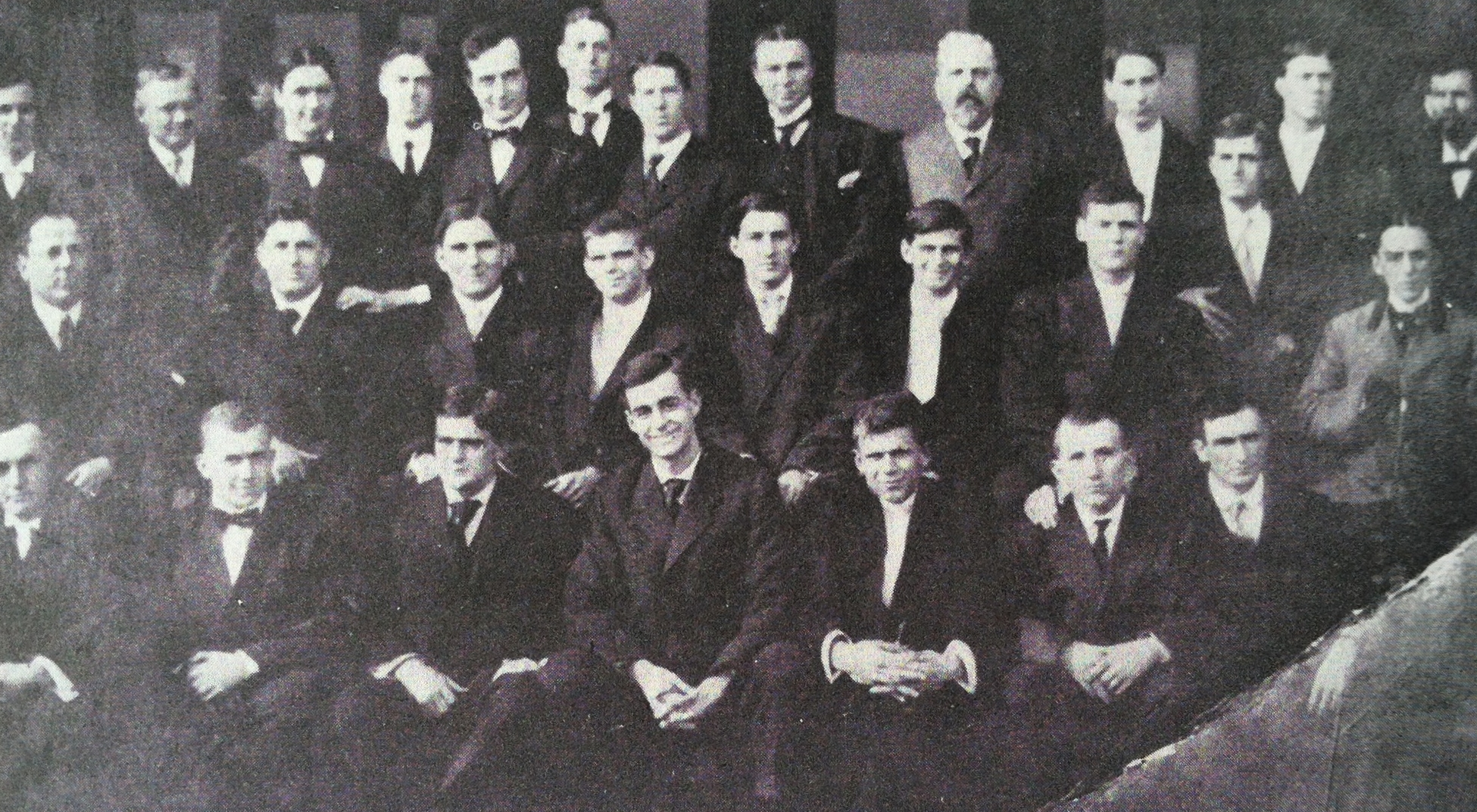
The 1906 Vanderbilt football team. Chorn is middle row, third from left.

Chorn attended Central College in Fayette, Missouri and Vanderbilt University in Nashville, Tennessee. He graduated from the latter with an LL.B. Chorn was a guard and tackle for Dan McGugin's Vanderbilt Commodores football teams, selected All-Southern in 1906, and second-team on an all-time Vanderbilt football team selected in 1912. At Vanderbilt he was a member of Kappa Sigma.

== Legal career ==
After graduation, he opened a law office in Fayette, Missouri, practicing for two years. In 1909 he became chief clerk of the commission that revised the Missouri statutes. In 1910 and 1911 he served in the state auditor's office, and in 1913 was chief clerk of the Supreme Court of Missouri.
