= 1906 Alabama Crimson White football team =

American college football season

1906 Alabama Crimson White football
- Conference: Southern Intercollegiate Athletic Association
- Record: 5–1 (3–1 SIAA)
- Head coach: J. W. H. Pollard (1st season)
- Captain: Washington Moody
- Home stadium: The Quad; Birmingham Fairgrounds

1906 Southern Intercollegiate Athletic Association football standings
| | Conf. | | | | | Overall |
| Team | W | | L | | T | W | | L | | T |
|---|---|---|---|---|---|---|---|---|---|---|
| Vanderbilt + | 4 | – | 0 | – | 0 | 8 | – | 1 | – | 0 |
| Clemson + | 4 | – | 0 | – | 0 | 4 | – | 0 | – | 3 |
| Sewanee | 5 | – | 1 | – | 0 | 8 | – | 1 | – | 0 |
| Alabama | 3 | – | 1 | – | 0 | 5 | – | 1 | – | 0 |
| Ole Miss | 3 | – | 2 | – | 0 | 4 | – | 2 | – | 0 |
| Georgia Tech | 3 | – | 3 | – | 0 | 6 | – | 3 | – | 1 |
| Georgia | 2 | – | 2 | – | 1 | 2 | – | 4 | – | 1 |
| LSU | 0 | – | 1 | – | 1 | 2 | – | 2 | – | 2 |
| Mississippi A&M | 0 | – | 2 | – | 1 | 2 | – | 2 | – | 1 |
| Tennessee | 0 | – | 3 | – | 1 | 1 | – | 6 | – | 2 |
| Mercer | 0 | – | 2 | – | 0 | 1 | – | 4 | – | 0 |
| Tulane | 0 | – | 2 | – | 0 | 0 | – | 4 | – | 1 |
| Auburn | 0 | – | 5 | – | 0 | 1 | – | 5 | – | 1 |
| Cumberland (TN) | | | – | | | | | – |
| Nashville | | | – | | | | | – |
+ – Conference co-champions

The 1906 Alabama Crimson White football team (Note: Alabama football teams were not referred to as the "Crimson Tide" until the 1907 season. Prior to 1907, the team was called the "Crimson White" from 1893 to 1906 and the "Cadets" in 1892.) (variously "Alabama", "UA" or "Bama") represented the University of Alabama in the 1906 Southern Intercollegiate Athletic Association football season. It was Alabama's 14th overall and 11th season as a member of the Southern Intercollegiate Athletic Association (SIAA). The team was led by head coach J. W. H. Pollard, in his first year, and played their home games at both the University of Alabama Quad in Tuscaloosa and the Birmingham Fairgrounds in Birmingham, Alabama. They finished the season with a record of five wins and one loss (5–1 overall, 3–1 in the SIAA).

== Schedule ==
| Date | Opponent | Site | Result | Source |
|---|---|---|---|---|
| October 6 | Maryville (TN)* | The Quad; Tuscaloosa, AL | W 6–0 | |
| October 13 | Howard (AL)* | The Quad; Tuscaloosa, AL | W 14–0 | |
| October 20 | at Vanderbilt | Dudley Field; Nashville, TN | L 0–78 | |
| November 3 | at Mississippi A&M | Hardy Field; Starkville, MS (rivalry) | W 16–4 | |
| November 17 | Auburn | Birmingham Fairgrounds; Birmingham, AL (rivalry) | W 10–0 | |
| November 29 | Tennessee | Birmingham Fairgrounds; Birmingham, AL (rivalry) | W 51–0 | |
*Non-conference game

- Scoring note: (Note: For the 1906 season, point values were different from those used in contemporary games. In 1906 a touchdown was worth five points, a field goal was worth four points and a conversion (PAT) was worth one point.)

== Game summaries ==
=== Maryville (TN) ===
Alabama opened the 1906 season against Maryville College at Tuscaloosa, and defeated the Maryville Scots 6–0. In the game, the lone touchdown was scored in the first quarter on a ten-yard run by P. B. Jones.

=== Vanderbilt ===
Alabama's 78–0 loss to Vanderbilt still stands as the record for most points allowed by Alabama in a game and most lopsided Alabama loss. In the game, the Commodores led 57–0 at the half, and Alabama attempted to cancel this game after seven of their regular players were sidelined by injury but Vanderbilt refused.

=== Auburn ===
Against Auburn, Pollard unveiled a "military shift" never before seen in the south. Star running back Auxford Burks scored all of the game's points in a 10–0 victory. Auburn contended Alabama player T. S. Sims was an illegal player.
