= W. T. McLain =

American football player, lawyer, and politician (1885–1938)

Profile
- Position: Guard/Center

Personal information
- Born: June 4, 1885; Arkansas, U.S.
- Died: July 4, 1938 (aged 53); Memphis, Tennessee, U.S.
- Listed weight: 196 lb (89 kg)

Career information
- College: Vanderbilt (1906–1908)

Awards and highlights
- SIAA championship (1906); All-Southern (1906, 1908)

William Tyler "Fatty" McLain (June 4, 1885 – July 4, 1938) was an American college football player, lawyer, and politician. McLain was once Attorney-General of Tennessee's Fifteenth District, Shelby County.

== Vanderbilt ==
McLain was an All-Southern college football guard for Dan McGugin's Vanderbilt Commodores. He was captain-elect for 1909. At Vanderbilt, he was a member of Kappa Alpha Order.
