= E. E. Tarr =

American sports coach (1880–1950)

Biographical details
- Born: May 2, 1880; Maryland, U.S.
- Died: August 13, 1950 (aged 70); Los Angeles, California, U.S.
- Education: Western Maryland (1903)

Coaching career (HC unless noted)

Football
- 1903–1904: Adrian
- 1906: Mercer
- 1910: Little Rock Central HS (AR)
- 1913 (spring): Jonesboro Aggies
- 1915: Bethany (WV)
- c. 1917–1919: Staunton Military Academy (VA)

Basketball
- 1902–1906: Adrian

Baseball
- 1904: Adrian

Head coaching record
- Overall: 11–15 (college football); 19–13 (college basketball); 4–2 (college baseball)

Edward Eugene Tarr (May 2, 1880 – August 13, 1950) was an American football and basketball coach.

== Coaching career ==
Tarr was the head football coach at Adrian College in Adrian, Michigan. He held that position for the 1903 and 1904 seasons. His coaching record at Adrian was 7–6. He also coached at Mercer University for the 1906 season where he compiled a record of 2–3. He was Mercer's first paid coach.

Tarr was a graduate of McDaniel College (then known as Western Maryland College) in 1903. He spent some time coaching in Alabama, Arkansas, and at the Carlisle Indian School. He served as the head football coach at Little Rock Central High School in 1910.

Tarr was initially hired to be the head football coach for the First District Agricultural School of Jonesboro, Arkansas—now known as Arkansas State University—but never coached a game after having to take a leave of absence to Philadelphia following his sister's illness.

== Head coaching record ==
=== College football ===
Year	Team	Overall	Conference	Standing	Bowl/playoffs
Adrian Bulldogs (Michigan Intercollegiate Athletic Association) (1903–1904)
1903	Adrian	5–4	0–3		
1904	Adrian	2–2	1–2		
Adrian:		7–6	1–5		
Mercer Baptists (Southern Intercollegiate Athletic Association) (1906)
1906	Mercer	1–4	0–2	T–11th	
Mercer:		1–4	0–2		
Bethany Bison (Independent) (1915)
1915	Bethany	3–5			
Bethany:		3–5			
Total:		11–15			
