= 1906 Auburn Tigers football team =

American college football season

1906 Auburn Tigers football
- Conference: Southern Intercollegiate Athletic Association
- Record: 1–5–1 (0–5 SIAA)
- Head coach: Mike Donahue (3rd season)
- Captain: W. C. Whitner
- Home stadium: Drill Field; West End Park

1906 Southern Intercollegiate Athletic Association football standings
	Conf.					Overall
Team	W		L		T	W		L		T
Vanderbilt +	4	–	0	–	0	8	–	1	–	0
Clemson +	4	–	0	–	0	4	–	0	–	3
Sewanee	5	–	1	–	0	8	–	1	–	0
Alabama	3	–	1	–	0	5	–	1	–	0
Ole Miss	3	–	2	–	0	4	–	2	–	0
Georgia Tech	3	–	3	–	0	6	–	3	–	1
Georgia	2	–	2	–	1	2	–	4	–	1
LSU	0	–	1	–	1	2	–	2	–	2
Mississippi A&M	0	–	2	–	1	2	–	2	–	1
Tennessee	0	–	3	–	1	1	–	6	–	2
Mercer	0	–	2	–	0	1	–	4	–	0
Tulane	0	–	2	–	0	0	–	4	–	1
Auburn	0	–	5	–	0	1	–	5	–	1
Cumberland (TN)			–					–
Nashville			–					–
+ – Conference co-champions

The 1906 Auburn Tigers football team represented Alabama Polytechnic Institute (now known Auburn University) as a member of the Southern Intercollegiate Athletic Association (SIAA) during the 1906 college football season.. The team was led by head coach Mike Donahue, in his third year, and played their home games at both the Drill Field in Auburn and West End Park in Birmingham, Alabama. They finished the season with a record of one win, five losses, and one tie (1–5–1 overall, 0–5 in the SIAA).

== Schedule ==
Date	Opponent	Site	Result	Source
October 8	Maryville (TN)*	Drill Field; Auburn, AL	T 0–0	
October 13	Gordon College*	Drill Field; Auburn, AL	W 15–0	
October 26	Sewanee	West End Park; Birmingham, AL	L 5–10	
November 3	at Georgia Tech	The Flats; Atlanta, GA (rivalry)	L 0–11	
November 10	at Clemson	Bowman Field; Calhoun, SC (rivalry)	L 4–6	
November 17	vs. Alabama	Birmingham Fairgrounds; Birmingham, AL (Iron Bowl)	L 0–10	
November 29	vs. Georgia	Central City Park; Macon, GA (rivalry)	L 0–4	
*Non-conference game
