= Dan A. Killian =

American football and baseball coach

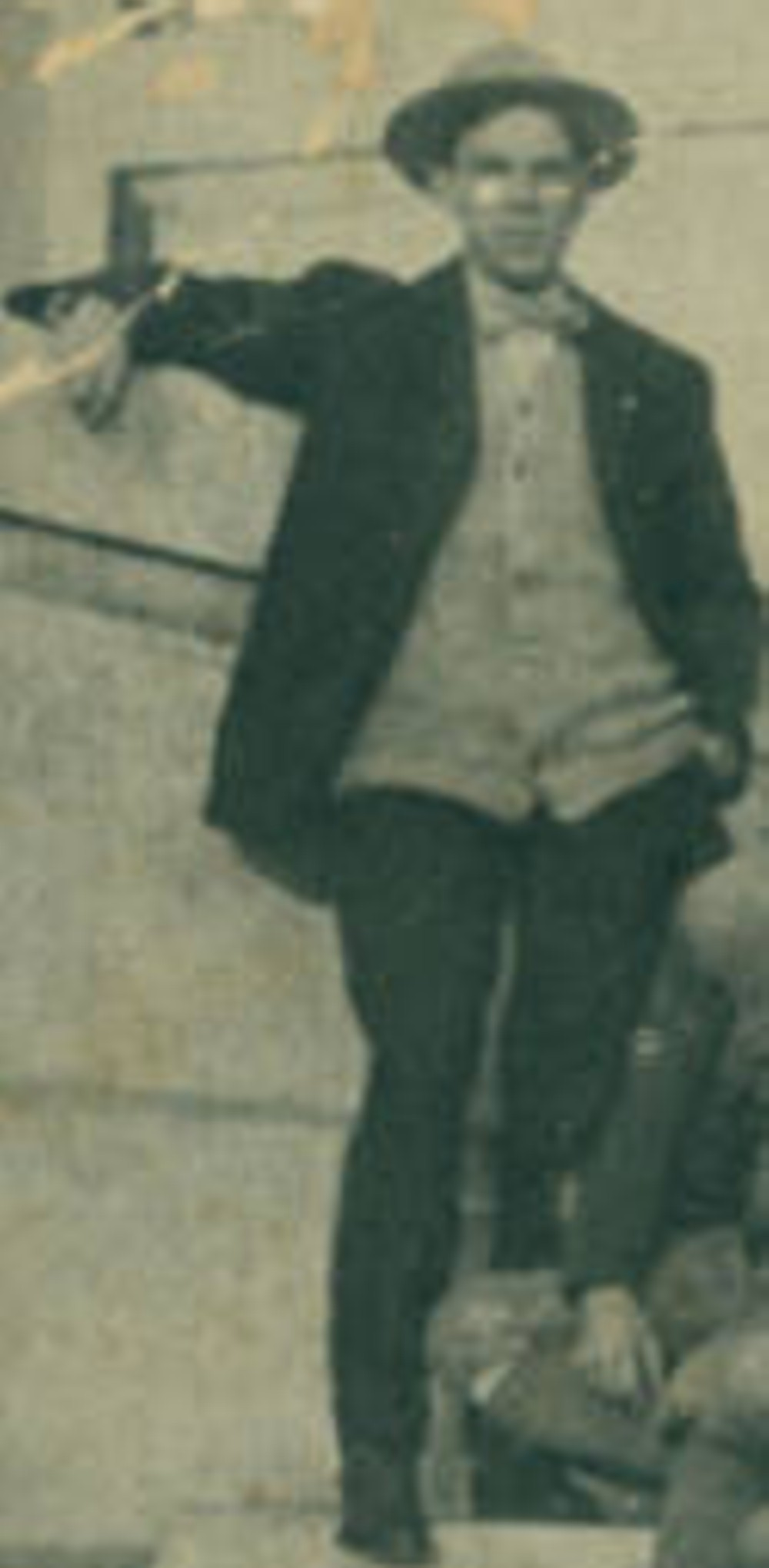

Biographical details
- Born: February 5, 1880; Allegan, Michigan, U.S.
- Died: January 15, 1953 (aged 72); Lansing, Michigan, U.S.
- Education: University of Michigan (1902)

Coaching career (HC unless noted)

Football
- 1904–1906: LSU

Baseball
- 1905–1906: LSU

Track and Field
- 1905–1906: LSU

Head coaching record
- Overall: 8–6–2 (football); 14–9 (baseball)

Dan Arnold Killian (February 5, 1880 – January 15, 1953) was an American college football and college baseball coach. He served as the head football coach at Louisiana State University (LSU) from 1904 to 1906, compiling a record of 8–6–2. Killian was also the head coach of the LSU baseball team from 1905 to 1906 (tallying a mark of 14–9), as well as head coach of the LSU Tigers track and field team from 1905 to 1906. He also served as athletic director.

Killian was a graduate of the University of Michigan, where he lettered as a shortstop in baseball in 1902. He also reportedly played quarterback on the football team, but if he did, he apparently did not qualify for a letter.

In 1906 he left coaching "to do sporting work for a newspaper" in Chicago.

He died in Lansing, Michigan in 1953.

== Head coaching record ==
=== Football ===
Year	Team	Overall	Conference	Standing	Bowl/playoffs
LSU Tigers (Southern Intercollegiate Athletic Association) (1904–1906)
1904	LSU	3–4	1–2		
1905	LSU	3–0	2–0		
1906	LSU	2–2–2	0–1–1		
LSU:		8–6–2	3–3–1		
Total:		8–6–2			

=== Baseball ===
Record table
Season	Team	Overall	Conference	Standing	Postseason
LSU Tigers (Southern Intercollegiate Athletic Association) (1905–1906)
1905	LSU	4–6			
1906	LSU	10–3			
LSU:		14–9 (.609)			
Total:		14–9 (.609)			
