= Roscoe Word (American football guard) =

American football player, coach, and lawyer (1882–1942)

Profile
- Position: Guard

Personal information
- Born: January 3, 1882; Marianna, Arkansas, U.S.
- Died: May 27, 1942 (aged 60); Knoxville, Tennessee, U.S.

Career information
- College: University of Tennessee

Career history

Playing
- 1904–1905: Tennessee
- 1907: Tennessee

Coaching
- 1906: Tennessee (assistant)

Awards and highlights
- All-Southern (1907)

Roscoe "Piggy" Word (January 3, 1882 – May 27, 1942) was a college football player and coach and lawyer.

== University of Tennessee ==
Word was a prominent guard for the Tennessee Volunteers of the University of Tennessee. He was its only three-time captain and was selected All-Southern in 1907. In 1906 he was an assistant coach, the team's first.

== Law ==
Word was a member of the Knoxville firm of Smith, Word, & Anderson.

== See also ==
- 1907 College Football All-Southern Team
