= John Russ (American football) =

American football coach

Coaching career (HC unless noted)
- 1906: Tulane

Head coaching record
- Overall: 0–4–1

John Russ was an American college football coach. He served as the head football coach at Tulane University in 1906. Tulane recorded a 0–4–1 record that season.

== Head coaching record ==
Year	Team	Overall	Conference	Standing	Bowl/playoffs
Tulane Olive and Blue (Southern Intercollegiate Athletic Association) (1906)
1906	Tulane	0–4–1	0–3	14th	
Tulane:		0–4–1	0–3		
Total:		0–4–1			
