= 1906 Ole Miss Rebels football team =

American college football season

1906 Ole Miss Rebels football
- Conference: Southern Intercollegiate Athletic Association
- Record: 4–2 (3–2 SIAA)
- Head coach: Thomas S. Hammond (1st season)
- Captain: Cleveland P. Huggins

1906 Southern Intercollegiate Athletic Association football standings
	Conf.					Overall
Team	W		L		T	W		L		T
Vanderbilt +	4	–	0	–	0	8	–	1	–	0
Clemson +	4	–	0	–	0	4	–	0	–	3
Sewanee	5	–	1	–	0	8	–	1	–	0
Alabama	3	–	1	–	0	5	–	1	–	0
Ole Miss	3	–	2	–	0	4	–	2	–	0
Georgia Tech	3	–	3	–	0	6	–	3	–	1
Georgia	2	–	2	–	1	2	–	4	–	1
LSU	0	–	1	–	1	2	–	2	–	2
Mississippi A&M	0	–	2	–	1	2	–	2	–	1
Tennessee	0	–	3	–	1	1	–	6	–	2
Mercer	0	–	2	–	0	1	–	4	–	0
Tulane	0	–	2	–	0	0	–	4	–	1
Auburn	0	–	5	–	0	1	–	5	–	1
Cumberland (TN)			–					–
Nashville			–					–
+ – Conference co-champions

The 1906 Ole Miss Rebels football team represented the University of Mississippi during the 1906 Southern Intercollegiate Athletic Association football season. Games with Tennessee on October 27 and with Arkansas on November 17 were canceled. This the first season of the legal forward pass. James C. Elmer of Ole Miss caught the first forward pass in the history of the Egg Bowl rivalry. Elmer's kicking accounted for 13 points in a 29–5 rout. For the first time the game marked the end of the season for not one but both teams.

== Schedule ==
Date	Opponent	Site	Result	Source
October 4	Maryville (TN)*	Oxford, MS	W 16–6	
October 13	at Vanderbilt	Dudley Field; Nashville, TN (rivalry)	L 0–29	
October 20	at LSU	State Field; Baton Rouge, LA (rivalry)	W 9–0	
November 3	at Tulane	Athletic Park; New Orleans, LA (rivalry)	W 17–0	
November 12	vs. Sewanee	Red Elm Park; Memphis, TN	L 0–24	
November 29	vs. Mississippi A&M	State Fairgrounds; Jackson, MS (rivalry)	W 29–5	
*Non-conference game
