= 1906 Georgia Bulldogs football team =

American college football season

1906 Georgia Bulldogs football
- Conference: Southern Intercollegiate Athletic Association
- Record: 2–4–1 (2–2–1 SIAA)
- Head coach: George S. Whitney (1st season)
- Captain: Dan Sage
- Home stadium: Herty Field

1906 Southern Intercollegiate Athletic Association football standings
	Conf.					Overall
Team	W		L		T	W		L		T
Vanderbilt +	4	–	0	–	0	8	–	1	–	0
Clemson +	4	–	0	–	0	4	–	0	–	3
Sewanee	5	–	1	–	0	8	–	1	–	0
Alabama	3	–	1	–	0	5	–	1	–	0
Ole Miss	3	–	2	–	0	4	–	2	–	0
Georgia Tech	3	–	3	–	0	6	–	3	–	1
Georgia	2	–	2	–	1	2	–	4	–	1
LSU	0	–	1	–	1	2	–	2	–	2
Mississippi A&M	0	–	2	–	1	2	–	2	–	1
Tennessee	0	–	3	–	1	1	–	6	–	2
Mercer	0	–	2	–	0	1	–	4	–	0
Tulane	0	–	2	–	0	0	–	4	–	1
Auburn	0	–	5	–	0	1	–	5	–	1
Cumberland (TN)			–					–
Nashville			–					–
+ – Conference co-champions

The 1906 Georgia Bulldogs football team represented the University of Georgia during the 1906 Southern Intercollegiate Athletic Association football season. The Bulldogs completed the season with a 2–4–1 record. Georgia’'s only victories came against Mercer and Auburn. The season included Georgia's third straight loss to Georgia Tech and the seventh straight loss to Clemson. During the 1906 season, the forward pass was legalized and the team tried to use this new play, however, an errant pass contributed to the loss to Davidson. This was the Georgia Bulldogs' first season under the guidance of head coach George S. Whitney.

== Schedule ==
Date	Opponent	Site	Result	Source
October 13	Davidson*	Herty Field; Athens, GA	L 0–15	
October 20	at Clemson	Bowman Field; Calhoun, SC (rivalry)	L 0–6	
November 3	at Mercer	Central City Park; Macon, GA	W 55–0	
November 10	at Georgia Tech	The Flats; Atlanta, GA (rivalry)	L 0–17	
November 21	Tennessee	Herty Field; Athens, GA (rivalry)	T 0–0	
November 29	vs. Auburn	Central City Park; Macon, GA (rivalry)	W 4–0	
December 1	at Savannah A.C.*	Savannah, GA	L 0–12	
*Non-conference game
