= Mike Thompson (American football official) =

American coach, football referee, and baseball umpire

Biographical details
- Born: July 22, 1877; Waterbury, Connecticut, U.S.
- Died: May 31, 1939 (aged 61); Emmitsburg, Maryland, U.S.

Playing career
- 1899–1900: Georgetown

Coaching career (HC unless noted)

Football
- 1908–1910: Washington College
- 1911–1912: Mount St. Mary's

Basketball
- 1911–1913: Mount St. Mary's
- 1917–1920: Mount St. Mary's

Baseball
- 1901–1912: Washington College
- 1911–1913: Mount St. Mary's
- 1918–1920: Mount St. Mary's

Michael J. Thompson (July 22, 1877 – May 31, 1939) was once dean of American football officials, as well as a baseball umpire. He famously officiated the 1903 Carlisle-Harvard football game.

He also coached, at Washington College in Chestertown, Maryland, and at Mount St. Mary's University in Emmitsburg, Maryland. In Emmitsburg, he was later a burgess. He died unexpectedly on May 31, 1939.

== Early life ==
Thompson was born on July 22, 1877, in Waterbury, Connecticut, to Owen Thompson and Anna Mary nee Collins. He attended the College of the Holy Cross, where he helped organize the football team. Thompson was a graduate of Georgetown University in Washington D. C., where he was the first graduate manager of athletics in 1901.
