= Fritz Furtick =

American football player (1882–1962)

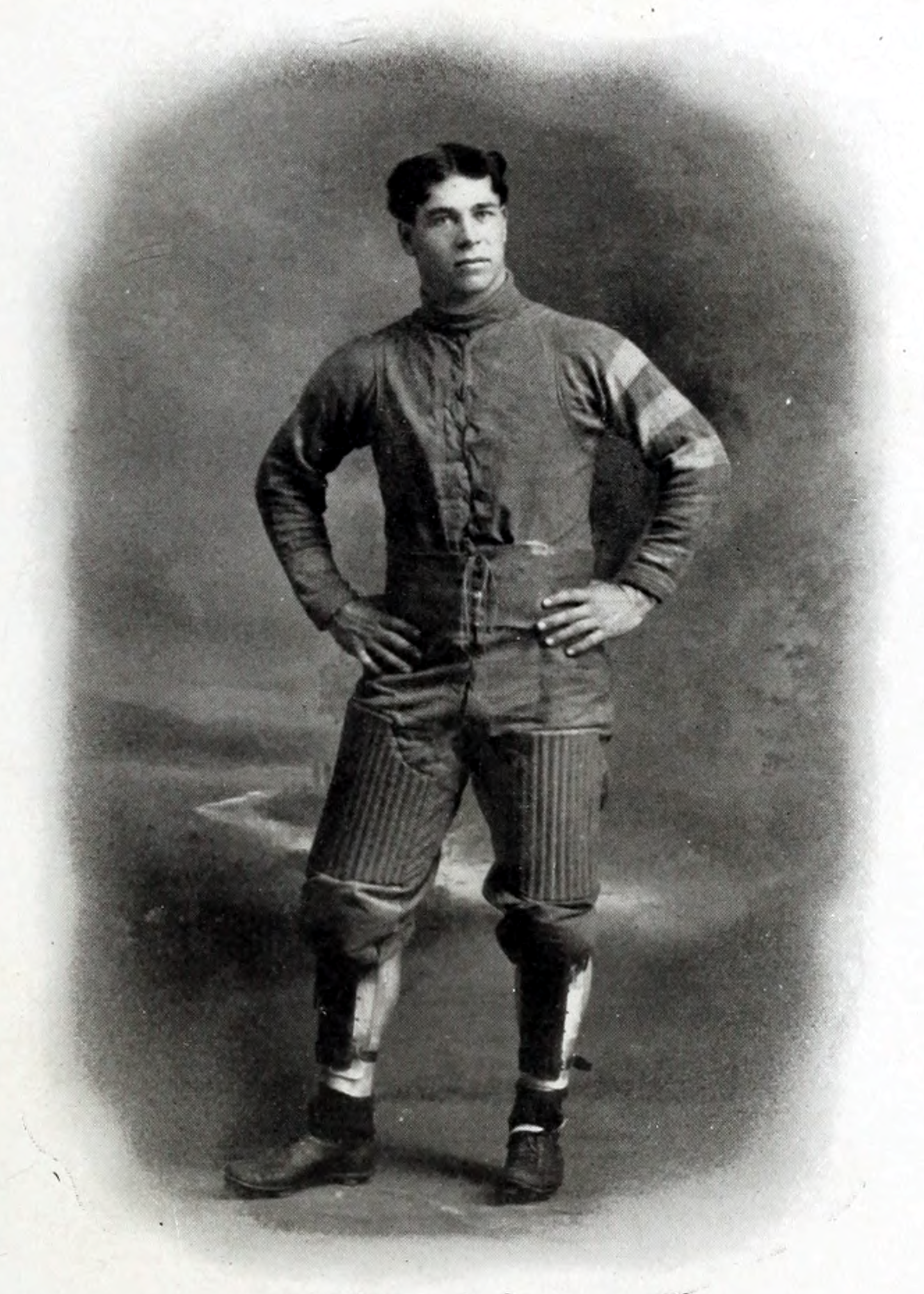

Clemson Tigers
- Position: Halfback

Personal information
- Born: July 15, 1882; Sandy Run, South Carolina, U.S.
- Died: May 5, 1962 (aged 79); Oregon, U.S.
- Listed weight: 170 lb (77 kg)

Career information
- College: Clemson (1903–1906)

Awards and highlights
- SIAA championship (1903); All-Southern (1905, 1906)

Fritz Malholmes Furtick (July 15, 1882 – May 5, 1962) was an American football halfback for the Clemson Tigers of Clemson University. He was twice selected All-Southern, and was captain of the undefeated 1906 team.

== Early life ==
Fritz was born on July 15, 1882, in Sandy Run, South Carolina, to Wade Hampton Furtick and Narcissa Ellen Saylor.

== College football ==
Furtick made Clemson's second score in the 1903 game with Cumberland billed as the championship of the South which ended in an 11–11 tie. It was also John Heisman's last game coached at Clemson. Cumberland had expected a trick play, when Furtick simply ran up the middle he scored. The referee of the Tennessee clash which ended in a tie, Frank Watkins, said "Furtick was as good bucking halfback as he had ever seen." "In the opening game with V. P. I. of 1906 that ended in a scoreless tie, Furtick played what the Atlanta Constitution called "the game of his life" on both sides of the ball.
