= Mac McLaurin =

American football player

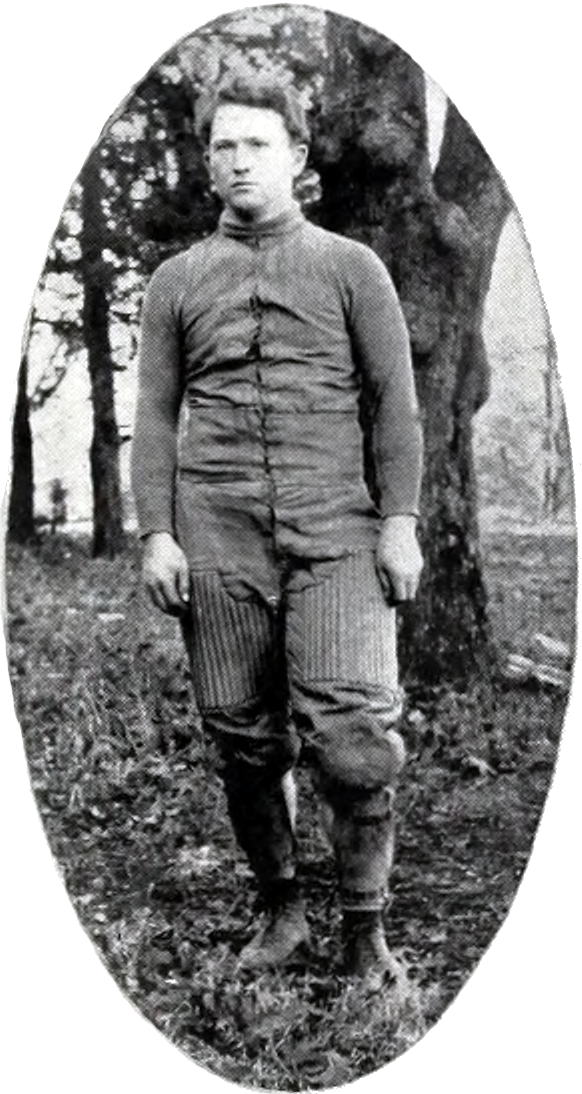

Profile
- Position: Tackle/Guard

Personal information
- Born: c. 1884; South Carolina
- Listed height: 5 ft 9 in (1.75 m)
- Listed weight: 190 lb (86 kg)

Career information
- College: Clemson (1904–1907)

Awards and highlights
- All-Southern (1907)

J. N. "Mac" McLaurin was a college football player. McLaurin was a prominent tackle and guard for the Clemson Tigers football team of Clemson University from 1904 to 1907.

== 1907 ==
He was captain in 1907, a year in which he was selected All-Southern. "Captain McLaurin has played right tackle this year in superb style. He has never been out of condition, and is one of the most reliable men Clemson has ever had." He weighed 190 pounds.
