= List of Vanderbilt Commodores football All-Southerns =

Vanderbilt Commodores football All-Southerns are American football players who have been named as All-Southerns while playing for the Vanderbilt University football team.

== Overview ==
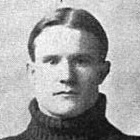
John Edgerton.

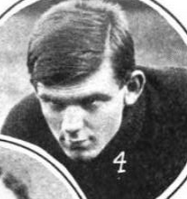
Bob Blake.

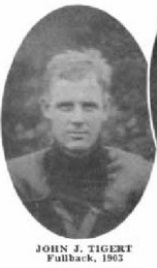
John J. Tigert.

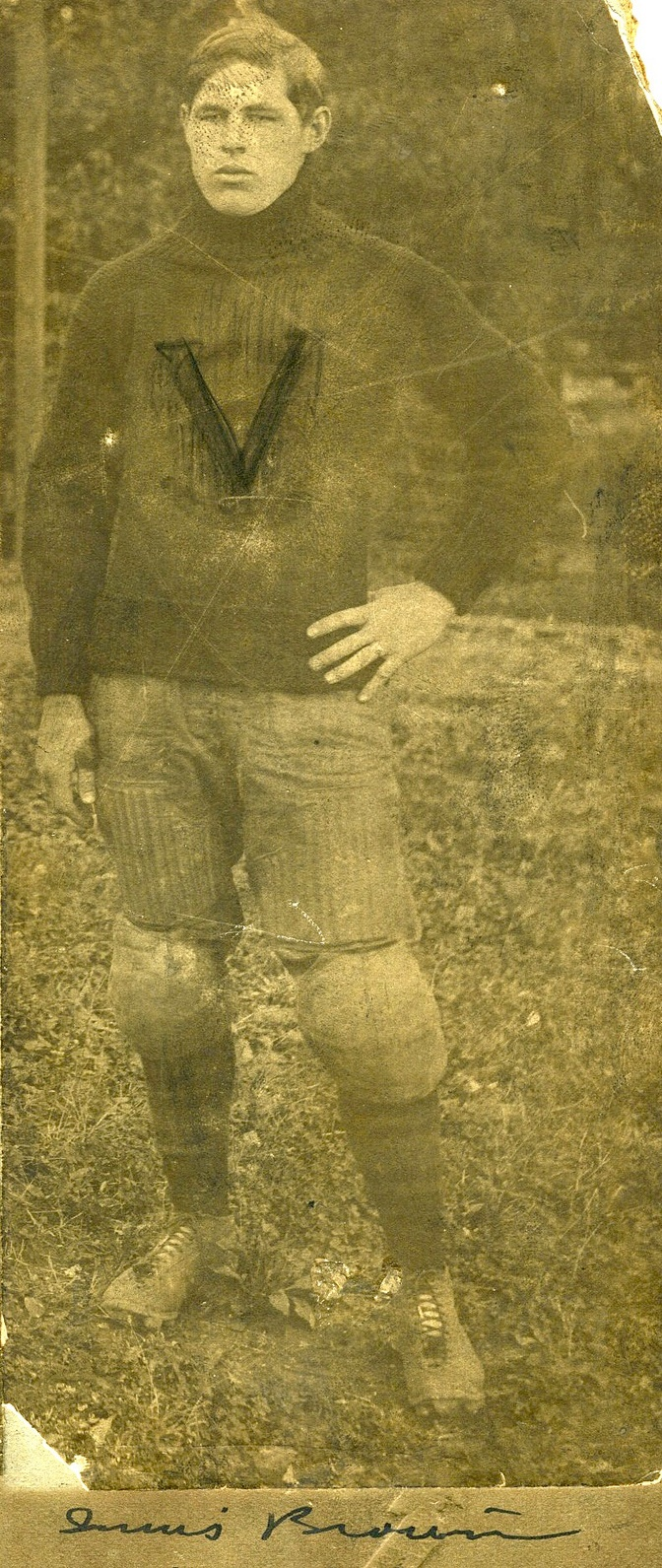
Innis Brown.

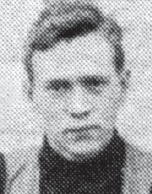
Stein Stone.

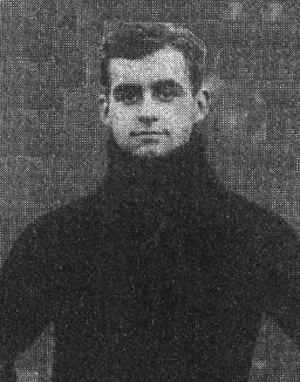
Owsley Manier.

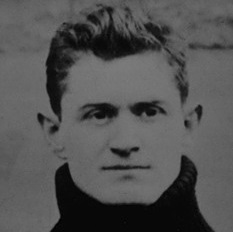
Ray Morrison.

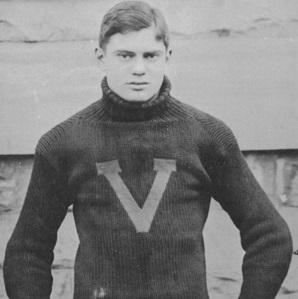
W. E. Metzger.

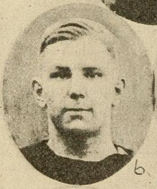
Lew Hardage.

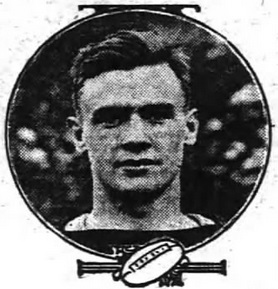
Ammie Sikes.

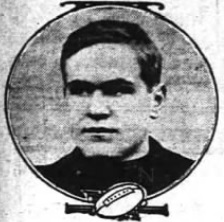
Enoch Brown.

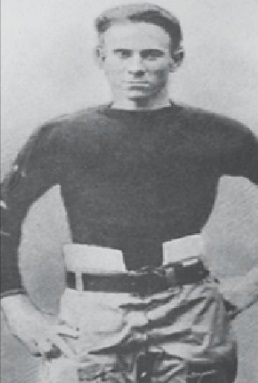
Rabbit Curry.

Since 1902, 63 Vanderbilt Commodores football players earned first-team All-Southern honors.

== Sortable chart of Vanderbilt's All-Southerns ==
Bold = unanimous selection.

Player	Position	Year	Composite	Selectors
Dye, Jack	HB	1898	No	WAL
Simmons, Walter	E	1899	No	HMS
Crutchfield, Wallace	G	1899	No	O
Edgerton, John	FB	1902	No	WA, JLD-as hb
Blake, Bob	E	1903	Yes	H; NY; JLD
Tigert, John	HB	1903	Yes	H
Hamilton, Ed	E	1904	Yes	EC; H-2
Brown, Innis	G	1904	Yes	H-1; EC
Stone, Stein	C	1904	Yes	H-1; JLD; EC
Manier, Owsley	E	1904	No	H-2, WRT-2
Graham, Irish	T	1904	No	C, H-2, WRT-2, NB
Kyle, Frank	QB	1904	No	H-2
Craig, Honus	HB	1904	Yes	C, H-1, WRT-1, JLD, NB, EC
**Blake, Bob**	E	1905	Yes	WRT-1, BW-1, HY, AL, NE, AJ, JLD, WMR
Hamilton, Ed	E	1905	Yes	WRT-1, BW-1, HY, AL, NE, AJ, JLD
Taylor, Hillsman	T	1905	Yes	WRT-1, BW-1, HY, NE, AJ, JLD, WMR
Pritchard, Joe	T	1905	No	BW-2, NE
Stone, Stein	G	1905	Yes	WRT, BW-2, NE, JLD, WMR
Brown, Innis	G	1905	No	WRT-2, BW-2, NE, WMR
Patterson, Robert C.	C	1905	Yes	WRT-2, BW-1, NE, AJ, JLD
Kyle, Frank	QB	1905	Yes	C, BW-1, AL, NE, AJ, JLD, NB
**Craig, Honus**	HB	1905	Yes	WRT-1, BW-1, HY, AL, NE, AJ, JLD, WMR
Blake, Dan	HB	1905	Yes	WRT-1, BW-2, NE, AJ
**Manier, Owsley**	FB	1905	Yes	WRT-1, BW-1, HY, NE, AJ, JLD, WMR
**Blake, Bob**	E	1906	Yes	AWL, WP, MT, MCA, PW, DM
**Pritchard, Joe**	T	1906	Yes	AWL, WP, MT, MCA, PW, DM
Noel, Edwin	T	1906	No	AWL, MT
Chorn, Walter	G	1906	No	AWL, MT, MCA, PW, DM
McLain, Fatty	G	1906	No	AWL, MT
Stone, Stein	C	1906	Yes	AWL, WP, MCA-as tackle, PW, DM
Costen, Sam	QB	1906	Yes	AWL, MT, MCA, PW, DM
**Blake, Dan**	HB	1906	Yes	AWL, MT, MCA, PW, DM
Craig, Honus	HB	1906	Yes	MCA, PW, DM
**Manier, Owsley**	FB	1906	Yes	AWL, WP, MT, MCA, DM
**Blake, Bob**	E	1907	Yes	TP, NY, DM, H
Sherrell, Horace	G	1907	Yes	TP, DM
Stone, Stein	C	1907	Yes	TP, DM, H
Costen, Sam	QB	1907	Yes	NY-as half, DM
**Craig, Honus**	HB	1907	Yes	TP, NY, DM, H
Campbell, Vin	HB	1907	No	H
**Blake, Vaughn**	E	1908	Yes	DM, H, NB, VA
Morrison, Ray	E	1908	No	NB
Hasslock, Louis	G	1908	Yes	DM, H, NB
McLain, Fatty	C	1908	Yes	DM
Neely, Bill	E	1909	No	GR
Ross, Ted	G	1909	No	GR
Metzger, W. E.	FB	1909	No	H-1
Neely, Bill	E	1910	Yes	GR, DJ, C
Stewart, Willis	E	1910	No	BC-1
Freeland, Ewing	T	1910	Yes	GR, DJ, C
**Metzger, W. E.**	G	1910	Yes	GR, DJ, C
Morrison, Ray	HB	1910	Yes	GR, DJ, C
Williams, Henry H.	FB	1910	No	H-2
Brown, Enoch	E	1911	No	BS-2
Brown, Tom	T	1911	No	H-2
Freeland, Ewing	T	1911	No	NS-1, BS-1
Metzger, W. E.	G	1911	Yes	NS-2, BS-1, H-1, DJ
Morgan, Hugh	C	1911	Yes	NS-1, BS-1
Morrison, Ray	QB	1911	Yes	NS-1, BS-1
Hardage, Lew	HB	1911	Yes	NS-1, BS-1
Sikes, Ammie	HB	1911	No	NS-2
Collins, Wilson	HB	1911	No	H-2
Brown, Enoch	E	1912	Yes	C, IB, NS-2
Brown, Tom	T	1912	Yes	C, IB, NS
Daves, Herman	G	1912	No	C
Morgan, Hugh	C	1912	Yes	C, IB, NS-2, SS-as guard
**Hardage, Lew**	HB	1912	Yes	C, IB, NS, SS
Sikes, Ammie	FB	1912	Yes	C, IB
**Brown, Enoch**	E	1913	Yes	C, ZC-1, D-1, BC, AR
**Brown, Tom**	T	1913	Yes	C, ZC-1, BC, AR
Hasslock, Louis	G	1908	No	AR
Morgan, Hugh	C	1913	No	ZC-1
Putnam, Emmett	C	1913	No	D-2
Morrison, Ray	QB	1913	No	AR
Boensch, Hord	QB	1913	No	ZC-2, D-2
Sikes, Ammie	FB	1913	No	D-1, ZC-2-as hb
Cody, Josh	T	1914	No	ZC
Curry, Rabbit	HB	1914	Yes	ZC, C, HC, WL
Sikes, Ammie	HB	1914	No	ZC, C, IB, EG, H
Cohen, Russ	E	1915	Yes	C
Cody, Josh	T	1915	Yes	C
Williams, Pryor	G	1915	No	C
Hamilton, C. M.	G	1915	No	C
**Curry, Rabbit**	QB	1915	Yes	C
Williams, Pryor	G	1916	No	C
Carman, Charlie	G	1916	No	C
Curry, Rabbit	QB	1916	Yes	C, HS
Floyd, Red	HB	1916	No	C, HS
Adams, Alf	E	1917	Yes	C, DJ, H, GT
Adams, Alf	E	1919	Yes	MB, JLR, ST, ZN, LR, FA, MJ, S, NYS
Zerfoss, Tom	E	1919	No	CR, JLR
Cody, Josh	T	1919	Yes	H, CR, MB, JLR, ST, D, WGF, ZN, LR, FA, BR, MJ, BD, S, NYS
Lipscomb, Tom	G	1919	No	JLR, ZN
Latham, Swayne	QB	1919	No	ST
Hendrick, Gink	G	1920	No	FA, SM-as end, KS, CR-as end
Bomar, Lynn	T	1921	No	JLR, MM, SM
Elam, Frank	T	1921	No	GAB
Sharpe, Alf	C	1921	No	MM
Wade, Pink	T	1921	No	CEB, EH, ER, BB
**Bomar, Lynn**	E	1922	Yes	C, BE, MA, ZN-as T, ED-as T, EH, MB, JP-as T
Neill, Scotty	E	1922	No	BE, ZN
Bradford, Tex	T	1922	No	BE
Kelly, Tuck	G	1922	No	BE
Kuhn, Doc	QB	1922	No	BE
Reese, Gil	HB	1922	No	BE
Bomar, Lynn	E	1923	Yes	C, MB, MN-2
Wakefield, Hek	E	1923	Yes	C, MT
Rives, Bob	T	1923	No	C, MT
Kelly, Tuck	G	1923	Yes	C
Reese, Gil	HB	1923	Yes	C, MT
Wakefield, Hek	E	1924	Yes	C, C2, UGA, VU
Rives, Bob	T	1924	Yes	C, C2, VU
Lawrence, Fatty	G	1924	No	VU
Reese, Gil	HB	1924	Yes	C, C2, VU
Ryan, Tom	HB	1924	No	VU
Rives, Bob	T	1925	Yes	C, TQ [as end], NEB-2
McKibbon, Ox	T	1925	No	S
Reese, Gil	HB	1925	No	TQ
McKibbon, Ox	E	1926	No	C
Spears, Bill	QB	1926	Yes	C
Creson, Larry	E	1927	No	AP-2, UP-2, C, WMA
Sharpe, Vernon	C	1927	No	AP-2, UP-1, WMA
Spears, Bill	QB	1927	Yes	AP-1, UP-1, C, CP, WMA, EB
Armistead, Jimmy	FB	1927	No	AP-2
Abernathy, Dick	E	1928	Yes	AP-1, NH
Brown, Bull	G	1928	No	AP-2
Armistead, Jimmy	QB	1928	No	AP-2, NH-2-as hb
Abernathy, Dick	T	1929	Yes	AP-1, WB-2
Brown, Bull	G	1929	Yes	AP-1, WB-1
Leonard, Amos	HB	1929	No	WA-3
Schwartz, Bill	E	1930	No	AP-2
Leyendecker, Tex	T	1931	Yes	AP-1
Gracey, Pete	C	1931	Yes	AP-1
Henderson, Tommy	QB	1931	No	WA-3
Roberts, Clyde	HB	1931	No	WA-2
Leyendecker, Tex	T	1932	Yes	AP-1, AL
Talley, Marion	G	1932	No	AP-2, AL
Gracey, Pete	C	1932	Yes	AP-1, AL
Roberts, Clyde	HB	1932	No	AP-2, AL
