= 1903 College Football All-Southern Team =

American all-star college football team

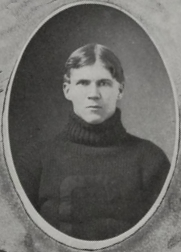
Carl Sitton

The 1903 College Football All-Southern Team consists of American football players selected to the College Football All-Southern Teams selected by various organizations for the 1903 Southern Intercollegiate Athletic Association football season.

Both John Heisman and Reynolds Tichenor selected teams. Fuzzy Woodruff relates: "The first selections that had any pretense of being backed by a judicial consideration were made by W. Reynolds Tichenor, old-time Auburn quarterback, who had kept in intimate contact with football through being a sought-after official. The next selections were made by John W. Heisman, who was as good a judge of football men as the country ever produced."

So did Nash Buckingham, former captain of the Tennessee Volunteers football team.

== Tichenor's eleven ==
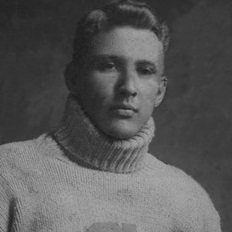
Henry D. Phillips

Reynolds Tichenor's eleven as posted in Fuzzy Woodruff's A History of Southern Football includes:

- J. C. Anderson, halfback for Cumberland.
- Bob Blake, end for Vanderbilt, unanimous selection, was a lawyer and Rhodes Scholar selected for the Associated Press Southeast Area All-Time football team 1869-1919 era.
- Marvin O. Bridges, guard for Cumberland, unanimous selection. The next season, he coached the University of Florida at Lake City.
- Puss Derrick, guard for Clemson.
- Jock Hanvey, fullback for Clemson, unanimous selection. He assisted teammate Pee Wee Forsythe coach the Florida State College team.
- Joseph Lee Kirby-Smith, tackle for Sewanee, the son of Edmund Kirby-Smith. He later moved to Jacksonville, Florida as a practicing dermatologist and gaining distinction throughout Florida and the south.
- John Maxwell, quarterback for Clemson. He returned the kickoff to open the second half 100 yards for Clemson's first score in the game with Cumberland billed as the championship of the South, which ended in an 11–11 tie.
- Henry D. Phillips, guard for Sewanee, unanimous selection. Sportswriter Fuzzy Woodruff called him "the greatest football player who ever sank cleated shoes into a chalk line south of the Mason-Dixon line." He was inducted into the College Football Hall of Fame in 1959.
- Carl Sitton, end for Clemson. One publication reads "Vetter Sitton and Hope Sadler were the finest ends that Clemson ever had perhaps." He also played baseball.
- Red Smith, center for Cumberland. Cumberland coach A. L. Phillips said Smith was the "only man he ever saw who has reduced football to a science."
- John J. Tigert, halfback for Vanderbilt. Like Blake, he too was a Rhodes Scholar. He was later a prominent educator, including the president of the University of Florida and the U.S. Commissioner of Education. He was inducted into the College Football Hall of Fame in 1970.

== All-Southerns of 1903 ==
=== Ends ===
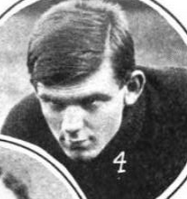
Bob Blake.

- Bob Blake†, Vanderbilt (H-1, WRT, NB, NY, JLD-1)
- Carl Sitton, Clemson (H-2, WRT, NB)
- Lois Thompson, Kentucky U. (NY, JLD-1)
- Hope Sadler, Clemson (H-1, JLD-2)
- Dan Blake, Vanderbilt (H-2)
- William Fisher, North Carolina (JLD-2)

=== Tackles ===
- Joseph Lee Kirby-Smith, Sewanee (H-2, WRT, NB-s)
- Branch Johnson, Virginia (NY, JLD-1)
- Walter Council, Virginia (NY, JLD-1)
- Frank Foust, North Carolina (H-1)
- Ephraim Kirby-Smith, Sewanee (NB)
- Harold Ketron, Georgia (H-2)

=== Guards ===
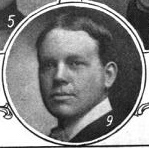
Marvin O. Bridges.

- Henry Phillips†, Sewanee (College Football Hall of Fame) (H-1, NY, JLD-1, WRT, NB [as t])
- Marvin O. Bridges†, Cumberland (H-1 [as t], NY, JLD-1, WRT [as t], NB [as hb])
- Puss Derrick, Clemson (JLD-2, WRT)
- Oliver Gardner, North Carolina A & M (H-1)
- T. B. Green, Tennessee (NB)
- W. W. Suddarth, Cumberland (NB)
- Innis Brown, Vanderbilt (H-2)
- Bully Jones, North Carolina (H-2)
- James C. Elmer, Virginia (JLD-2, NB-s)
- Green, Mississippi A&M (NB-s)

=== Centers ===
- Red Smith, Cumberland (H-1, WRT, NB)
- Clyde Conner, Virginia (NY, JLD-1)
- Roach Stewart, North Carolina (H-2)
- Percy Given, Georgetown (JLD-2)

=== Quarterbacks ===
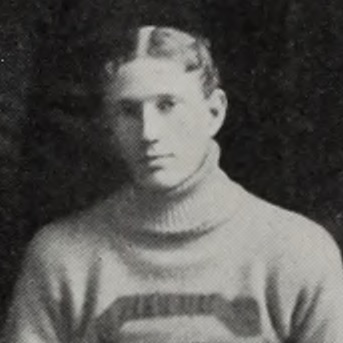
John Maxwell.

- John Maxwell, Clemson (H-1, JLD-2, WRT, NB)
- John Pollard, Virginia (NY, JLD-1)
- Frank Kyle, Vanderbilt (H-2)
- John Scarbrough, Sewanee (NB-s)

=== Halfbacks ===
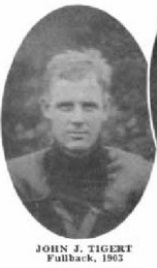
John J. Tigert.

- John J. Tigert, Vanderbilt (College Football Hall of Fame) (H-1, WRT, NB-s)
- J. C. Anderson, Cumberland (H-1, WRT)
- Joe Reilly, Georgetown (NY, JLD-1)
- Hunter Carpenter, VPI (College Football Hall of Fame) (NY, JLD-1)
- Rupert Colmore, Sewanee (H-2, NB)
- Fritz Furtick, Clemson (H-2)
- Wister Heald, Virginia (JLD-2)
- Hub Hart, Georgetown (JLD-2)

=== Fullbacks ===
- Jock Hanvey†, Clemson (H-1, NY, JLD-1, WRT, NB)
- E. L. Minton, Cumberland (H-2)
- Hogan Yancey, Kentucky U. (JLD-2)
- Sam Y. Parker, Tennessee (NB-2)

== Key ==
Bold = consensus choice by a majority of the selectors

† = Unanimous selection

H = selected by John Heisman, coach at Clemson University.

WRT = selected by W. R. Tichenor.

NB = selected by former Tennessee player Nash Buckingham in the Memphis Commercial Appeal. It had substitutes, denoted with a small S.

NY = selected by a prominent New Yorker hired for the purpose.

JLD = selected by John Longer Desaulles. It had a first and second team.
