= 1905 College Football All-Southern Team =

American all-star college football team

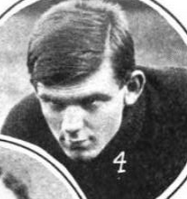
Bob Blake

The 1905 College Football All-Southern Team consists of American football players selected to the College Football All-Southern Teams selected by various organizations for the 1905 Southern Intercollegiate Athletic Association football season. Vanderbilt won the SIAA championship. Virginia Tech, an independent school, lost only to Navy and claims a southern championship for 1905.

== Consensus eleven ==
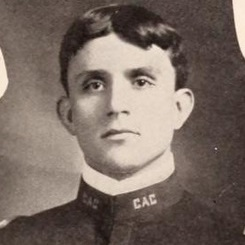
Puss Derrick

The All-Southern eleven representing the consensus of newspapers as published in Fuzzy Woodruff's A History of Southern Football 1890-1928 included:

- Bob Blake, end for Vanderbilt, unanimous selection, was a lawyer and Rhodes Scholar selected for the Associated Press Southeast Area All-Time football team 1869-1919 era.
- Dan Blake, halfback for Vanderbilt, brother of Bob. He later coached.
- Honus Craig, halfback for Vanderbilt, Dan McGugin once called him the South's greatest athlete and Vanderbilt's greatest halfback. One report says "When Craig was confronted with the above formidable title yesterday by a reporter whose business it is to know such things, he blushed like a girl and tried to show why Dan McGugin's judgment is not always to be trusted." In Craig's opinion, Bob Blake was the South's greatest player.
- Puss Derrick, guard and captain for Clemson. John de Saulles sums up Derrick's play in 1905; he "is a veteran player who, by steady improvement has put himself in the first rank of linesmen. He was the mainstay of the Clemson season and no other Southern player could so satisfactorily fill this important position; hence, to balance the team and utilize the best of the material available, he is shifted from center to guard."
- Ed Hamilton, end for Vanderbilt, coached Vanderbilt basketball in 1903–1904 and 1908–1909
- Frank Jones, tackle for Auburn, captain-elect for both football and basketball.
- Frank Kyle, quarterback for Vanderbilt, once head coach at Ole Miss.
- Owsley Manier, fullback for Vanderbilt, a "great plunging back."
- Robert C. Patterson, center for Vanderbilt, known as "Emma," he later coached at Georgia Military Academy and as an assistant for his alma mater in 1908.
- Stein Stone, guard for Vanderbilt, as a center selected for the Associated Press Southeast Area All-Time football team 1869-1919 era.
- Hillsman Taylor, tackle for Vanderbilt, later a prominent attorney who was Speaker of the House of Representatives of Tennessee in 1909. He was the father of Pulitzer Prize winning author Peter Matthew Hillsman Taylor.

== All-Southerns of 1905 ==
=== Ends ===
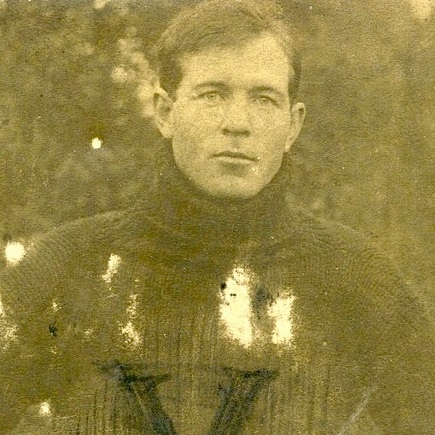
Ed Hamilton

- Bob Blake†, Vanderbilt (C, WRT-1, H-1, BW-1, HY, AL, NE, AJ, JLD, WMR, NB, M-1)
- Ed Hamilton, Vanderbilt (C, WRT-1, H-2, BW-1, HY, AL, NE, AJ, JLD, NB, M-1)
- Sam Roberts, Georgia Tech (WRT-2, AJ)
- Lewis Clark, Georgia Tech (H-1, BW-2 [as fb])
- Wilson, North Carolina (RR)
- Thomas Walker Lewis, VPI (RR)
- Craig Day, Georgia Tech (H-2, BW-2, M-2)
- Powell Lykes, Clemson (BW-2)
- C. P. Huggins, Mississippi (M-2)
- Jones Beene, Tennessee (H-3)
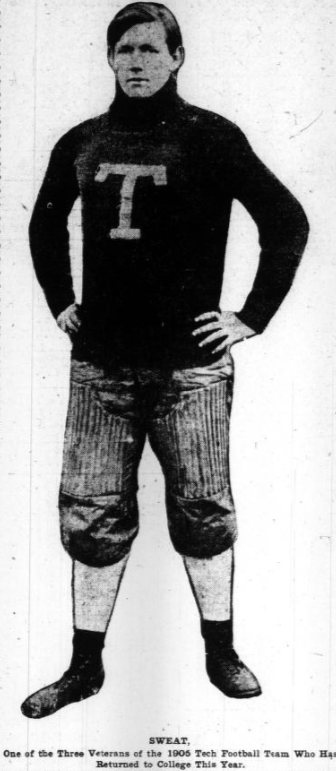
- Sweat
  Sweat, Georgia Tech (H-3)

=== Tackles ===
- Hillsman Taylor, Vanderbilt (C, WRT-1, H-1, BW-1, HY, NE, AJ, JLD, WMR, NB, M-1)
- Frank Jones, Auburn (C, WRT-1, H-1 [as g], BW-1, HY, AL [as g], AJ, JLD, M-2)
- Lex Stone, Sewanee (WRT-2, H-2, AJ, M-2 [as fb])
- Joe Pritchard, Vanderbilt (H-2, BW-2, NE, NB, M-1)
- Lob Brown, Georgia Tech (WRT-2 [as fb], H-1, BW-2)
- Pete Willson, VPI (RR)
- Bernard Hynes, VPI (RR)
- Harvey Sartain, Alabama (H-3)
- Wimberly, Cumberland (H-3)

=== Guards ===
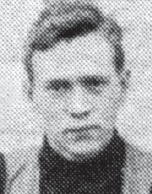
Stein Stone

- Puss Derrick, Clemson (C, WRT-2, H-3, BW-1, AL [as t], AJ, JLD, WMR [as t], M-2 [as t])
- Stein Stone, Vanderbilt (C, WRT-1, H-2, BW-2, NE, JLD, WMR, NB, M-1)
- T. S. Sims, Alabama (WRT-1, H-1, BW-1, HY, AL, AJ)
- Innis Brown, Vanderbilt (WRT-2, H-3, BW-2, NE, WMR, NB, M-1)
- Lucian Parrish, Texas (HY, M-2)
- Oliver Gardner, North Carolina (RR)
- Frank Stickling, VPI (RR)
- Roscoe Word, Tennessee (H-2, M-2)

=== Centers ===
- Robert C. Patterson, Vanderbilt (C, WRT-2, H-2, BW-1, NE, AJ, JLD, NB, M-1)
- George Watkins, Sewanee (H-1, BW-2, HY, AL [as t], AJ, M-2)
- Red Smith, Cumberland (WRT-1)
- Washington Moody, Alabama (AL)
- A. L. "Gus" Keasler, Clemson (WMR)
- Joseph Stiles, VPI (RR)
- Sims, Georgia Tech (H-3)

=== Quarterbacks ===
- Frank Kyle, Vanderbilt (C, H-1, BW-1, AL, NE, AJ, JLD, NB, M-1)
- John Scarbrough, Sewanee (WRT-1, H-3, BW-2, HY, AJ, WMR, M-2, RR)
- Stewart, Cumberland (WRT-2, H-2)

=== Halfbacks ===
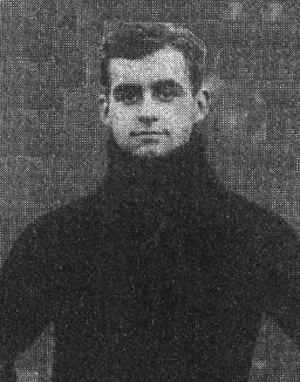
Owsley Manier

- Honus Craig†, Vanderbilt (C, WRT-1, H-1, BW-1, HY, AL, NE, AJ, JLD, WMR, NB, M-1, RR)
- Dan Blake, Vanderbilt (C, WRT-1, H-3 BW-2, NE, AJ, NB, M-1)
- Fritz Furtick, Clemson (WRT-2, H-1, BW-1, AL [as fb], AJ, WMR [as e])
- Auxford Burks, Alabama (WRT-2, H-2, BW-2, HY, AL, AJ, WMR, M-2)
- Hammond Johnson, Virginia (JLD, RR)
- W. Wilson, Georgia Tech (WRT-2 [as e], H-2)
- Don Robinson, Texas (M-2)
- Humphrey Foy, Auburn (H-3)

=== Fullbacks ===
- Owsley Manier†, Vanderbilt (C, WRT-1, H-1, BW-1, HY, NE, AJ, JLD, WMR, NB, M-1)
- LeRoy Abernethy, North Carolina (RR)
- Sam Y. Parker, Tennessee (H-2)
- E. L. Minton, Cumberland (H-3)

== Key ==
Bold = Consensus selection

† = Unanimous selection

C = consensus of newspapers published in Fuzzy Woodruff's A History of Southern Football 1890-1928.

WRT = selected by W. Reynolds Tichenor of Auburn, published in the Atlanta Journal. He had a first and second team.

H = selected John Heisman. It had a second and third team.

BW = selected by Bradley Walker, celebrated southern official. He had a first and second team.

HY = selected by coach H. C. Hyatt of the University of the South.

AL = selected by coach Jack Leavenworth of the University of Alabama.

NE = selected by a "Nashville Expert."

AJ = An attempt at a composite by the Journal, "players most favored by experts"

JLD = selected by John Longer Desaulles.

WMR = selected by professor W. M. Riggs of Clemson University.

NB = selected by former Tennessee player Nash Buckingham in the Memphis Commercial Appeal. He picked Vanderbilt's whole eleven.

M = selected by a Memphis writer. His first team was Vanderbilt's eleven.

RR = selected by coach R. R. Brown of Washington and Lee University.

== See also ==
- 1905 College Football All-America Team
