= 1904 College Football All-Southern Team =

American all-star college football team

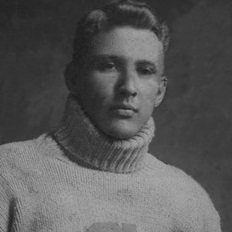
Henry D. Phillips.

The 1904 College Football All-Southern Team consists of American football players selected to the College Football All-Southern Teams selected by various organizations for the 1904 Southern Intercollegiate Athletic Association football season.

In Dan McGugin and Mike Donahue's first year as head coach, Vanderbilt and Auburn shared the SIAA championship, challenging John Heisman's eminence in the South.

== Composite eleven ==
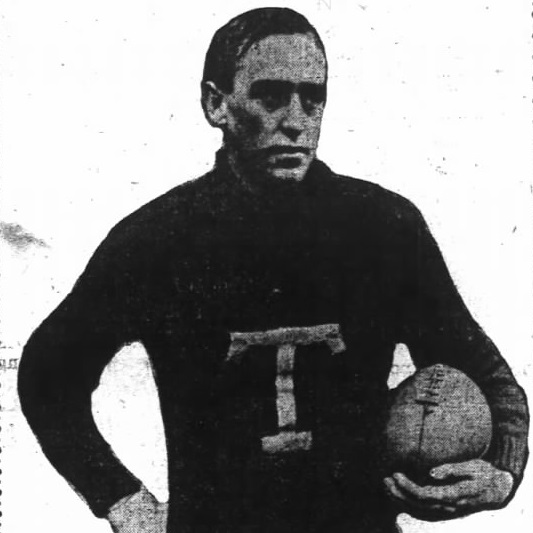
Lob Brown.

The composite eleven included:

- Jones Beene, end for Tennessee. He once coached the Chattanooga Mocs and was also the first coach of the Tennessee Wesleyan Bulldogs.
- Innis Brown, guard for Vanderbilt. He was also a Rhodes Scholar. Brown was later a referee who often commented on the sport, picking the Constitution's All-Southern team in 1912.
- Lob Brown, tackle for Georgia Tech. Some publications claim he was Tech's first All-Southern player, while others claim Jesse Thrash.
- Honus Craig, halfback for Vanderbilt. Dan McGugin once called him the South's greatest athlete and Vanderbilt's greatest halfback.
- Puss Derrick, tackle for Clemson. He was captain-elect, "and he has learned to run the ball" wrote former coach Heisman.
- Humphrey Foy, fullback for Auburn, the undefeated school's lone selection in Mike Donahue's first year. He was injured the year prior.
- Ed Hamilton, end for Vanderbilt. He coached Vanderbilt basketball in 1903–1904 and 1908–1909.
- Henry D. Phillips, guard for Sewanee, unanimous selection. Sportswriter Fuzzy Woodruff called him "the greatest football player who ever sank cleated shoes into a chalk line south of the Mason–Dixon line."
- John Scarbrough, quarterback for Sewanee, unanimous selection. On the dedication of Harris Stadium, one writer noted "The University of the South has numbered among its athletes some of the greatest. Anyone who played against giant Henry Phillips in 1901-1903 felt that he was nothing less than the best as guard and fullback. Anyone who ever saw a punt from the foot of J. W. Scarbrough."
- Willard Steele, halfback for Cumberland, made All-Southern in his first year on the varsity. He was a physician who specialized in diseases of the eye, ear, nose, and throat.
- Stein Stone, center for Vanderbilt. He was selected for the Associated Press Southeast Area All-Time football team 1869-1919 era.

== Composite overview ==
Henry D. Phillips and John Scarbrough were both unanimous selections.

Name	Position	School	First-team selections
Henry D. Phillips	Guard	Sewanee	10
John Scarbrough	Quarterback	Sewanee	10
Innis Brown	Guard	Vanderbilt	8
Jones Beene	End	Tennessee	7
Ed Hamilton	End	Vanderbilt	6
Lob Brown	Tackle	Georgia Tech	6
Stein Stone	Center	Vanderbilt	6
Honus Craig	Halfback	Vanderbilt	6
Humphrey Foy	Fullback	Auburn	6
Puss Derrick	Tackle	Clemson	5
Willard Steele	Halfback	Cumberland	5
Dan Blake	Halfback	Vanderbilt	3
W. Wilson	End	Georgia Tech	2+
Irish Graham	Tackle	Vanderbilt	1+
Hillsman Taylor	Tackle	Vanderbilt	1+
Ephraim Kirby-Smith	Tackle	Sewanee	1+
George Watkins	Center	Sewanee	1+
C. E. Elgin	Center	Nashville	1+
Ick Bryan	Halfback	Vanderbilt	1+
René A. Messa	Halfback	LSU	1+
Biddle	Halfback	Nashville	1+
Don Robinson	Halfback	Texas	1+
Gene Oliver	Halfback	South Carolina	1+
Joe Holland	Fullback	Clemson	1+
Sam Y. Parker	Fullback	Tennessee	1+

== All-Southerns of 1904 ==
=== Ends ===
- Jones Beene, Tennessee (C, H-1, WRT-1, NB, WJE, EC)
- Ed Hamilton, Vanderbilt (C, H-2 [as fb], WRT-2 [as fb], NB, WJE, EC)
- Billy Wilson, Georgia Tech (C, H-1, WRT-1)
- Newman Townsend, North Carolina (JLD, WK, WSK)
- Arthur Wilson, North Carolina A & M (WK, WSK)
- Owsley Manier, Vanderbilt (H-2, WRT-2)
- Arthur Sullivan, Georgia (H-2, WRT-2)

=== Tackles ===
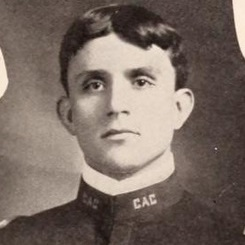
Puss Derrick.

- Lob Brown, Georgia Tech (C, H-1, WRT-1, EC)
- Puss Derrick, Clemson (C, H-1, WRT-1, EC)
- Irish Graham, Vanderbilt (C, H-2, WRT-2, NB, WJE)
- Walter Council, Virginia (JLD, WK, WSK)
- Matt Mahoney, Georgetown (JLD, WK [as g], WSK [as g])
- Oliver Gardner, North Carolina A & M (WK, WSK)
- Hillsman Taylor, Vanderbilt (C, NB)
- Ephraim Kirby-Smith, Sewanee, (C, WJE)
- Bill Streit, Auburn (H-2, WRT-2)

=== Guards ===
- Henry Phillips†, Sewanee (C, H-1, WRT-1, JLD, NB, WJE, EC)
- Innis Brown, Vanderbilt (C, H-1, WRT-1, NB, WJE, EC)
- Branch Johnson, Virginia (JLD, WK, WSK)
- Harvey Sartain, Alabama (H-2, WRT-2)
- Braswell, Auburn (H-2)
- William Pitt Moon, Auburn (WRT-2)

=== Centers ===
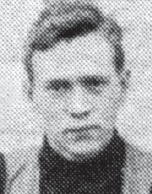
Stein Stone.

- Stein Stone (C, H-1, WRT-1, JLD, EC)
- George Watkins, Sewanee (C)
- C. E. Elgin, Nashville (C, NB, WJE)
- Roach Stewart, North Carolina (WK, WSK)
- Red Smith, Cumberland (H-2, WRT-2)

=== Quarterbacks ===
- John Scarbrough†, Sewanee (C, H-1, WRT-1, NB, WJE, EC)
- John Pollard, Virginia (JLD, WK, WSK)
- Frank Kyle, Vanderbilt (H-2, WRT-2)

=== Halfbacks ===
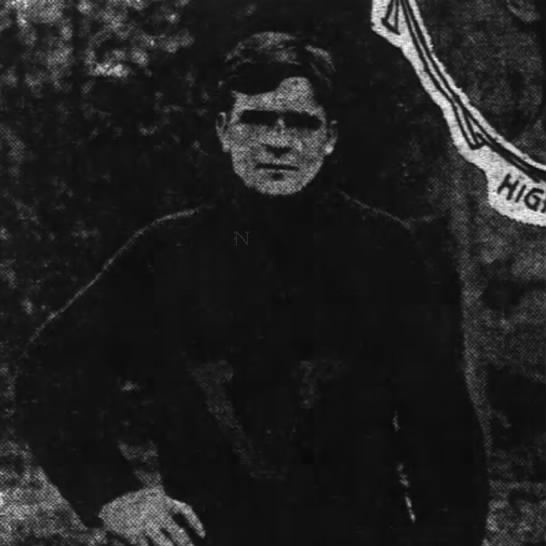
Honus Craig.

- Honus Craig, Vanderbilt (C, H-1, WRT-1, NB, WJE, JLD, EC)
- Willard Steele, Cumberland (C, H-1, WRT-1, GR, EC)
- Dan Blake, Vanderbilt (C, GR, WJE, NB)
- Hunter Carpenter, North Carolina (College Football Hall of Fame) (JLD [as fb], WK, WSK)
- Hub Hart, Georgetown (JLD [as e], WK, WSK)
- Ick Bryan, Vanderbilt (C)
- René A. Messa, LSU (C)
- Biddle, Nashville (C)
- Don Robinson, Texas (C)
- Gene Oliver, South Carolina (C)
- Hammond Johnson, Virginia (JLD)
- Auxford Burks, Alabama (H-2, WRT-2)

=== Fullbacks ===
- Humphrey Foy, Auburn (C, H-2 [as hb], WRT-1, WJE, EC)
- Joe Holland, Clemson (C, H-1, WRT-2)
- Sam Y. Parker, Tennessee (C, NB)
- LeRoy Abernethy, North Carolina A&M (WK, WSK)

== Key ==
Bold = Composite selection

† = Unanimous selection

C = received votes for a composite selection put together by John de Saulles using the teams of Grantland Rice, W. R. Tichenor, Heisman, and others.

H = selected by John Heisman, coach at Georgia Institute of Technology. He had a first and second team.

WRT = selected by W. R. Tichenor in the Atlanta News.

GR = selected by Grantland Rice in the Atlanta Journal.

NB = selected by former Tennessee player Nash Buckingham in the Memphis Commercial Appeal.

WJE = selected by William J. Ewing in the Nashville American.

JLD = selected by John de Saulles.

EC = selected by Edwin Camp, in Illustrated Sporting News.

WK = selected by Willis Keinholz, head coach at the North Carolina College of Agriculture and Mechanical Arts.

WSK = selected by W. S. Kimberly.
