= Newman Townsend =

American football player and attorney (1882–1951)

Profile
- Position: End

Personal information
- Born: May 1, 1882; Raynham, North Carolina, U.S.
- Died: April 11, 1951 (aged 68)

Career information
- College: North Carolina (1902–1905)

Awards and highlights
- All-Southern (1904)

Newman Alexander "Nat" Townsend (May 1, 1882 – April 11, 1951) was a college football player and attorney.

== Early life ==
Newman Townsend was born on May 1, 1882, in Raynham, North Carolina, to the reverend Jackson Townsend and his wife Sarah Melissa Oliver. The Townsend family had emigrated from the parish of Raynham in Norfolk, England.

== University of North Carolina ==
Townsend graduated from the University of North Carolina in 1905, and was a prominent member of its football team, selected for All-Southern teams in 1904. John Longer de Saulles disputed those who would call his year lucky, "Townsend, of Carolina, has attracted (sic) more attention than any Southern end during the season. It was Townsend's work for Carolina that defeated Virginia Polytechnic and it was his good office that took advantage of Pollard misplay in Richmond, giving Carolina her touchdown. These accidents happen repeatedly only with those who are playing up to the limit, and while the newspapers may call his playing accidental, it is impossible to disassociate these accidents from earnest intelligent and successful endeavors."

== Career in law ==
Townsend served as executive counsel to another former football star, governor Oliver Max Gardner, in 1930–31.
