= Walter Council =

American football player and physician (1882–1943)

- Born: April 25, 1882; Council, North Carolina, U.S.
- Died: November 13, 1943 (aged 61); Juneau, Alaska, U.S.
- Occupation: physician
- Football career

Profile
- Position: Tackle/Center

Personal information
- Listed weight: 195 lb (88 kg)

Career information
- College: North Carolina (1900–1901); Virginia (1902–1904)

Awards and highlights
- All-Southern (1902, 1903, 1904)

Walter Wooten "Bull" Council (April 25, 1882 – November 13, 1943) was a college football player and physician.

== Early life ==
Walter Council was born on April 25, 1882, in Council, North Carolina, which was named for his father, John Pickett Council. His mother was Johnanna Wooten Council. (Her first name, seen in various spellings, is listed as spelled in family records; it derives in part as a tribute to her father, John Wooten, who was thrown from a horse and killed before Johnanna's birth.)

=== University of North Carolina ===
Council was a prominent center for the North Carolina Tar Heels football teams of the University of North Carolina from 1900 to 1901.

=== University of Virginia ===
==== 1902 ====
John de Saulles brought him to the Virginia Cavaliers football team of 1902, where he played tackle, one of the best in the school's history. Council was selected All-Southern in 1902. He played opposite Branch Johnson on the line.

== Physician ==
He came to Alaska as a youth of 24 in 1905, less than a year after he was graduated with honors from the University of Virginia's medical school, and with a degree of Doctor of Philosophy from the University of North Carolina. At the time of his death he was the Dean of Alaska surgeons, Commissioner of Health for the Territory.

== See also ==
- South's Oldest Rivalry
