= Willard Steele =

American football player (1884–1970)

- Born: December 11, 1884; Corinth, Mississippi, U.S.
- Died: May 1, 1970 (aged 85); Chattanooga, Tennessee, U.S.
- Education: Jefferson Medical College
- Occupation: Physician
- Football career

Cumberland University
- Position: Halfback

Personal information
- Listed height: 5 ft 10 in (1.78 m)
- Listed weight: 178 lb (81 kg)

Career information
- College: Cumberland (1904–1907)

Awards and highlights
- All-Southern (1904)

Willard Hugo Steele (December 11, 1884 – May 1, 1970) was a college football player and physician. He specialized in diseases of the eye, ear, nose, and throat. His wife was Kate Adelle Hinds.

== Early life ==
Willard Steele was born on December 11, 1884, in Corinth, Mississippi, to Newton Chambers Steele, also a doctor, and Frances Ella Jones. He attended both Baylor School and Castle Heights Military Academy.

== Cumberland ==
=== Football ===
Steele played halfback for the Cumberland Bulldogs of Cumberland University in Lebanon, Tennessee.

==== 1904 ====
He made the All-Southern team in the year of 1904, his first on the team. At Cumberland he was a member of Kappa Sigma. One account reads "Willard Steele, at left half, weight 178 and height 5 feet 10 inches was easily the star of the team, and was placed on all-southern teams by Edwin Camp, Rice of the Atlanta Journal, and Buckingham of the Memphis Appeal. This is his first year of Varsity ball, after three years on strong prep teams. On the offense he is a hard, fierce player, whom it requires several men to down, and when playing on the defensive he is a masher of interference."

==== 1905 ====
Steele's career was plagued by injuries, and he played only a single varsity game in 1905.

== Physician ==
=== Vanderbilt and Jefferson Medical College ===
After Cumberland he went to Vanderbilt University to further his studies a few years, obtaining his M. D. from Jefferson Medical College in Philadelphia in 1911.

=== Chattanooga ===
Steele practiced for many years in Chattanooga.
