= Frank Jones (American football tackle) =

American football player

Profile
- Position: Tackle

Personal information
- Born: Alabama
- Listed height: 6 ft 0 in (1.83 m)
- Listed weight: 200 lb (91 kg)

Career information
- College: Auburn (1904–1905)

Awards and highlights
- All-Southern (1905)

Frank Jones was an American college football and basketball player. He played for the Birmingham Athletic Club and Howard College before attending Auburn.

== Auburn ==
Jones played for Mike Donahue's Auburn Tigers of Auburn University, selected an All-Southern tackle in 1905 and unanimously elected captain for 1906. He was the third ever Auburn Tiger selected All-Southern, behind only Humphrey Foy and James Elmer.

Jones was also captain of the first-ever Auburn basketball team. Basketball seemed to take off in the South in 1906, when Yale's basketball team traveled throughout the South. Auburn's two forwards, Bob Ware and Charlie Woodruff, played with Birmingham Athletic Club when it defeated Yale 24 to 18 on January 1, 1906. Auburn and B. A. C. battled to a 14 to 14 tie. The rules called for sudden-death overtime, but Jones refused to play the overtime period because he felt the referees weren't calling a fair game.

In 1915, John Heisman selected the 30 best Southern football players and mentioned Frank Jones 19th.
