= Puss Derrick =

American football player (1883–1965)

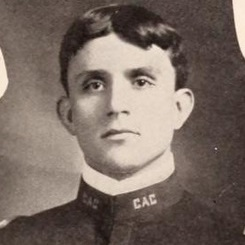
- Derrick c. 1905

Profile
- Position: Tackle/Guard/Center

Personal information
- Born: November 29, 1883; Chapin, South Carolina, U.S.
- Died: July, 1965; Bennettsville, South Carolina, U.S.
- Listed weight: 195 lb (88 kg)

Career information
- College: Clemson (1903–1906)

Awards and highlights
- SIAA championship (1903); All-Southern (1903, 1904, 1905, 1906)

Oscar Luther "Puss" Derrick (November 29, 1883 – July, 1965) was a college football player.

== Clemson College ==
Derrick was a lineman for the Clemson Tigers of Clemson University from 1903 to 1906, selected All-Southern every year he played. Derrick was still mentioned for an all-time Clemson team in 1960.

=== 1903 ===
He was a member of John Heisman's SIAA champion 1903 team with the likes of Hope Sadler and Carl Sitton

=== 1905 ===
In 1905, a year in which Derrick was captain, John de Saulles sums up Derrick's play; he "is a veteran player who, by steady improvement has put himself in the first rank of linesmen. He was the mainstay of the Clemson season and no other Southern player could so satisfactorily fill this important position; hence, to balance the team and utilize the best of the material available, he is shifted from center to guard."
