= Charles de Saulles =

American football player (1876–1962)

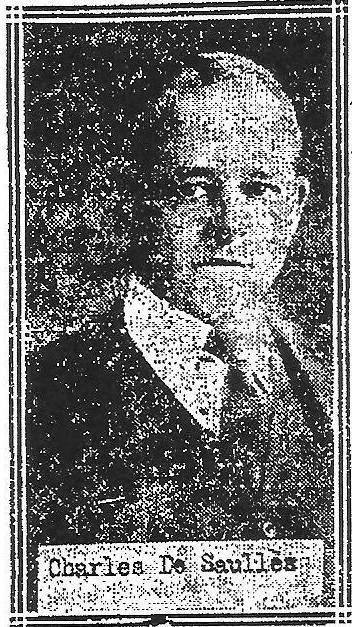
- Photograph of de Saulles from The Bridgeport Telegram, 1922

Yale Bulldogs
- Position: Quarterback

Personal information
- Born: November 22, 1876; South Bethlehem, Pennsylvania, U.S.
- Died: July 17, 1962 (aged 85); Mineola, New York, U.S.

Career information
- College: Yale (1897–1898)

Awards and highlights
- Consensus All-American (1897)

Charles August Heckscher de Saulles (November 22, 1876 – July 17, 1962) was an American industrialist who first became known as an All-American football player. He played quarterback for Yale University and was selected for the 1897 College Football All-America Team.

== All-American football player ==
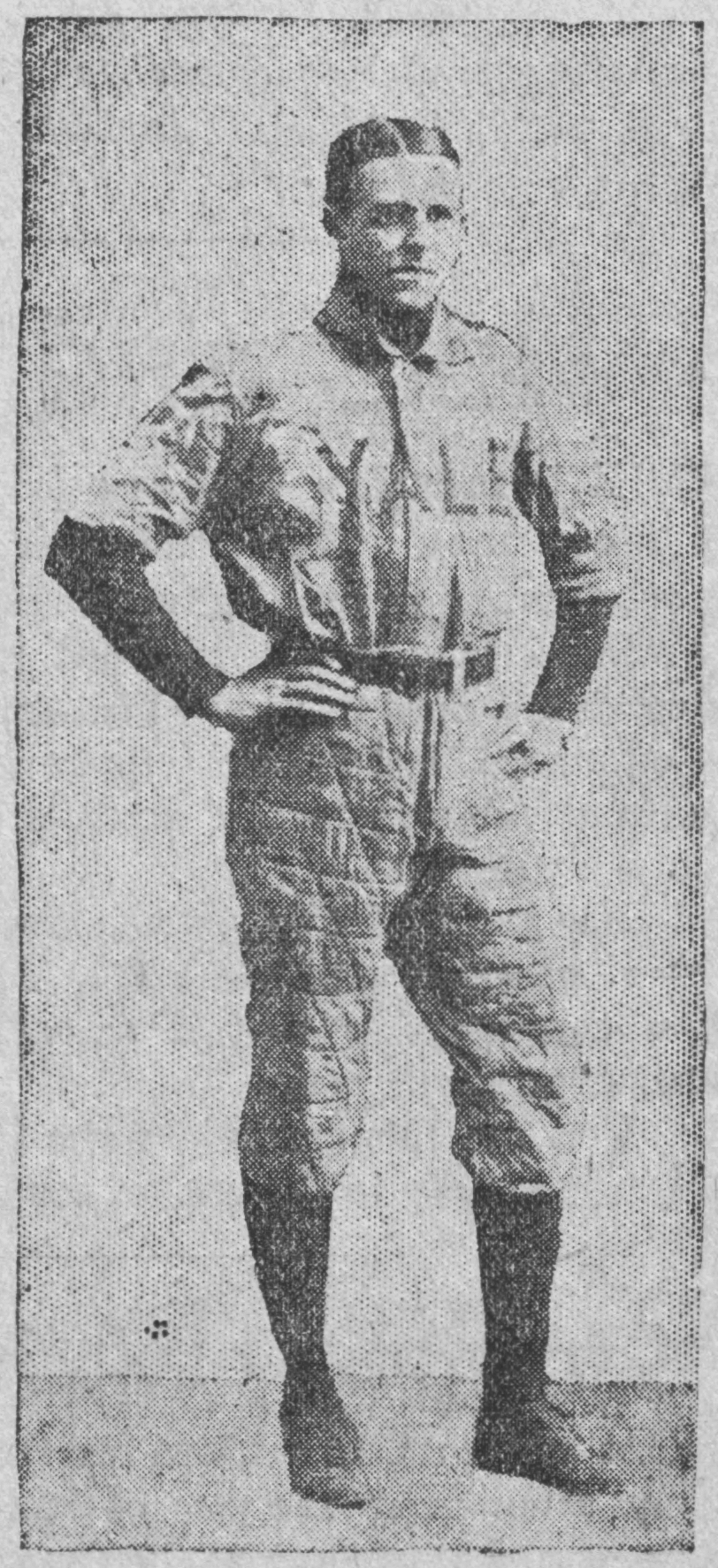
Charles wearing his Yale baseball uniform

A native of South Bethlehem, Pennsylvania, de Saulles attended the Lawrenceville School where he was captain of both the football and baseball teams. DeSaulles was five-feet, eight inches tall and weighed 151 pounds. De Saulles enrolled at Yale University where he played quarterback for the football team in 1897 and 1898 and was selected for the 1897 College Football All-America Team. He was also the captain of Yale's baseball team. Jim Rodgers, the captain of the 1897 Yale football team, credited de Saulles with Yale's victory over Princeton in 1897: "I have always claimed that Charlie de Saulles put the Yale '97 team on the map. Charlie de Saulles with his three wonderful runs, which averaged not less than 60 yards each, really brought about the victory." In his book "Football Days," William Hanford Edwards, who played on the Princeton line in that game, wrote of de Saulles: "De Saulles' open field work was remarkable. I remember well the great run of fifty-five yards which he made. He was a wonderfully clever dodger and used the stiff arm well. Charles Ives wrote a song about this football game titled simply Yale-Princeton Football Game.

In 1903, a football columnist wrote that "the equal of Charley de Saulles, however, will probably not be seen at Yale or any other college in many days."

== Football coach ==
In 1906, the New York Sun reported that de Saulles was affiliated with the Lasharpe football team in Iola, Kansas. De Saulles joined the team in 1905 as both a player and a coach. The Sun reported that de Saulles and Yale teammate Jim Rodgers were working together at Lasharpe and had turned a group of miners into a football team that had soundly beaten the Haskell Indians and Bethany College, and gone undefeated for two years. The Lasharpe team was seeking games against the major football powers at Michigan, Chicago, Yale and Harvard, leading the Sun to write:

"Out in the little mining town of Iola, Kans, there is probably the oddest football team in the country. Its members never train, have no practice except signal work, and yet are able to defeat all comers. The eleven is known as the Lasharpe team, is composed of men from the zinc smelting works, and learned its football from two of the best men that ever wore a 'Y' at New Haven. James Rodgers, captain of the 97 Yale eleven, and Charles A. de Saulles, one of the fastest and most daring quarter backs on Eli's long roll of honor, are the coaches who have turned the miners into one of the most effective gridiron machines in the Middle West."

== Later career ==
By 1926, de Saulles was the president of U.S. Zinc Corporation.

== Family ==
De Saulles was born in West Orange, New Jersey, the son of Arthur Brice de Saulles and Catherine Heckscher. His father was a noted soldier in the American Civil War. His younger brother John de Saulles also became an All-American quarterback at Yale. When the younger de Saulles became a star for Yale in his own right, comparisons were made to his older brother:

"But there is one particularly bright player on the New Haven team, and he is John Longer de Saulles, the famous quarter back of last fall. Johnny is a brother of Charlie de Saulles, the great football and baseball player of 1898 and 1899, and his work is true to family traditions. De Saulles plays second base (Charlie's old position), and he is snappy and accurate."

Charles de Saulles was married to Louise M. "Birdie" Hoch of Marshall, Michigan. In 1922, De Saulles' wife obtained a divorce and was awarded custody of their two sons. It was also reported at that time that Charles de Saulles had remarried.

== Blanca Errázuriz trial ==
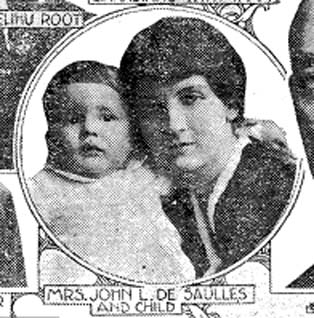
Blanca Errázuriz and son (1917)

In August 1917, John de Saulles was shot and killed by his millionairess Chilean ex-wife, Blanca Errázuriz. The murder and trial became a daily reported news story, relegating the First World War that was raging in Europe to the inside pages of the newspapers. Charles de Saulles was drawn into the media sensation as he defended his brother's honor and sought custody of the couple's only child. Blanca was unanimously acquitted of the murder charges in December 1917. Several days after the acquittal, Charles gave up the custody challenge, and "Little Jack" was returned to Blanca.
