= Lois Thompson =

American college football player (1881–1933)

Kentucky University
- Position: End

Personal information
- Born: October 15, 1881
- Died: May 4, 1933; Mount Sterling, Kentucky, U.S.

Career information
- College: Kentucky University (1903)

Awards and highlights
- All-Southern (1903)

William Lois Thompson (October 15, 1881 – May 4, 1933) was an American college football player for Kentucky University, selected All-Southern in 1903. Former Yale quarterback John de Saulles credited the end Thompson as playing "a better end than any man in the South." He also played baseball, including professionally.
