= Don Robinson (American businessman) =

American football player and coach

Biographical details
- Born: August 11, 1880; Morristown, Indiana, U.S.
- Died: April 18, 1949 (aged 68); Lamitan, Philippines

Playing career

Football
- 1900–1901: Montana Agricultural
- 1903–1905: Texas

Track and field
- 1904–1906: Texas
- Position: Halfback (football)

Coaching career (HC unless noted)

Football
- 1906: Butler

Head coaching record
- Overall: 1–0

Accomplishments and honors

Awards
- Football; All-Southern (1904); All-SWC half-century football team

William Doniphan "Don" Robinson (August 11, 1880 – April 18, 1949), also known as Mogul and Rosy Robinson, was an American college football player and coach, lawyer, and plantation owner. He served as the head football coach at Butler University in Indianapolis for one season in 1906.

Robinson initially attended Drury College—now known as Drury University—in Springfield, Missouri. He then went to the Agricultural College of the State of Montana—now known as Montana State University, where he played football in 1900 and 1901.

Robinson was a 1906 law school graduate of the University of Texas at Austin, where played football from 1903 to 1905, and ran track from 1904 to 1906. He was captain of the 1905 Texas Longhorns football team and earned the nicknames of "Rosy" and "Mogul" as a player. He was named to the Southwest Conference (SWC)'s half-century team (1900–1950) and inducted into the Texas Longhorn Hall of Honor in 1971.

After coaching at Butler, Robinson went to work as a U.S. government engineer in Hawaii and the Philippines. He then became a lawyer in Dallas. He married Ann Hodges, and in 1914 he returned to the Philippines and, with a partner bought a 100,000-tree, 700-acre coconut plantation on Basilan island. He made a fortune, earning the nickname of the "Coconut King of Zamboanga". During the Japanese occupation of the Philippines, he and his wife hid in the Mindanao jungles until the Americans liberated the area.

On April 18, 1949, Robinson was shot and killed by a discharged plantation foreman. He was cremated and his ashes were returned to the United States.

== Head coaching record ==
Year	Team	Overall	Conference	Standing	Bowl/playoffs
Butler Christians (Independent) (1906)
1906	Butler	1–0			
Butler:		1–0			
Total:		1–0			
