= John Scarbrough =

American football player (1885–1960)

Profile
- Position: Quarterback

Personal information
- Born: October 20, 1885; Rockdale, Texas, U.S.
- Died: March 3, 1960 (aged 74); Austin, Texas, U.S.
- Listed weight: 135 lb (61 kg)

Career information
- College: Sewanee (1904–1905)

Awards and highlights
- All-Southern (1904, 1905); All-Time Sewanee 2nd Team

John William Scarbrough (October 20, 1885 – March 3, 1960) was a college football player. He later became a successful department store owner in Austin.

== Early life ==
Scarbrough was born on October 20, 1885, in Rockdale, Texas, to Eugene Monroe Scarbrough and Ada Ledbetter.

== Sewanee ==
Scarbrough was an All-Southern quarterback for the Sewanee Tigers of Sewanee: The University of the South, and captain of its team in 1905. On the dedication of Harris Stadium, one writer noted "The University of the South has numbered among its athletes some of the greatest. Anyone who played against giant Henry Phillips in 1901-1903 felt that he was nothing less than the best as guard and fullback. Anyone who ever saw a punt from the foot of J. W. Scarbrough." One source calls him the "prince of punters and runners." Yet another, "the greatest kicker of them all." He also drop kicked.

He scored the Tigers' only points in the 68 to 4 loss to Vanderbilt.
