= Henry D. Phillips =

Bishop of Southwestern Virginia (1882–1955)

Henry Phillips
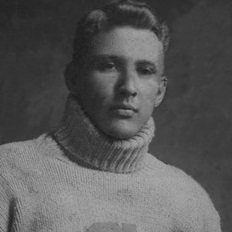
- Phillips while playing for Sewanee

Sewanee Tigers
- Positions: Guard, Fullback

Personal information
- Born: January 16, 1882; Philadelphia, Pennsylvania, U.S.
- Died: June 29, 1955 (aged 73); Boone, North Carolina, U.S.
- Listed height: 6 ft 2 in (1.88 m)
- Listed weight: 185 lb (84 kg)

Career information
- College: Sewanee (1900–1905)

Awards and highlights
- 3× All-Southern (1902, 1903, 1904); Sewanee Athletics Hall of Fame; All-Time Sewanee football team
- College Football Hall of Fame (Class of 1959)

Other information
- Bishop of Southwestern Virginia
- Church: Episcopal Church
- Diocese: Southwestern Virginia
- Elected: May 17, 1938
- In office: 1938–1954
- Predecessor: Robert Carter Jett
- Successor: William H. Marmion

Orders
- Ordination: June 16, 1907 by Cleland Kinloch Nelson
- Consecration: September 27, 1938 by Henry St. George Tucker

Personal details
- Born: January 16, 1882 Philadelphia, Pennsylvania, United States
- Died: June 29, 1955 (aged 73) Boone, North Carolina, United States
- Buried: Trinity Episcopal Cathedral (Columbia, South Carolina)
- Denomination: Anglican
- Parents: Henry Desborough Phillips; Nancy Phillips
- Spouse: Ella Parr Reese (m. September 25, 1907)
- Children: 3
- Occupation: Previously college footballer
- Education: Sewanee: The University of the South

Henry Disbrow Phillips (January 16, 1882 – June 29, 1955) was an American Episcopal bishop (1938–1955) and college football player and coach (1900–1909). Sportswriter Fuzzy Woodruff called him "the greatest football player who ever sank cleated shoes into a chalk line south of the Mason–Dixon line."

== Early life ==
Henry Disbrow Phillips was born on January 16, 1882. He was educated at Boys High School in Atlanta, Georgia.

== Sewanee ==
Henry D. Phillips attended Sewanee: The University of the South. He played for the Sewanee Tigers football team and baseball team. He is honored with a stained glass window in the University Chapel.

=== Football playing career ===
Phillips was thrice selected All-Southern. Sportswriter Fuzzy Woodruff called him "the greatest football player who ever sank cleated shoes into a chalk line south of the Mason–Dixon line." Coach John Heisman mentioned him third when he selected the twenty-five best Southern football players in 1915. (Note: Phillips was nominated though not selected for an Associated Press All-Time Southeast 1869-1919 era team.)

On the dedication of Harris Stadium in 1957, one writer noted "The University of the South has numbered among its athletes some of the greatest. Anyone who played against giant Henry Phillips in 1901-1903 felt that he was nothing less than the best as guard and fullback." He was posthumously elected to the College Football Hall of Fame in 1959 and is a member of the Sewanee Athletics Hall of Fame.

A description of his play by John de Saulles included "His weakness has always, and only, been that of Southern players generally – defense."

=== Football coaching career ===
He played Sewanee football for six seasons, and then spent two as a line coach. The two as line coach included a Southern Intercollegiate Athletic Association (SIAA) championship in 1909. He assisted his alma mater from 1909–1911; and 1914–1915.

== SIAA ==
He was also president of the Southern Intercollegiate Athletic Association (SIAA) from 1919 to 1922.

== Bishop ==
After graduating from Sewanee Phillips was ordained in the Episcopal Church. He was ordained deacon in 1906 and priest in 1907.

=== La Grange ===
He then served as minister-in-charge of St Mark's Church in LaGrange, Georgia and warden of the LaGrange Settlement till 1915.

=== Chaplain and Professor ===
Between 1915 and 1921 he served as chaplain at the University of South, professor of English Bible and rector of Otey Memorial Parish in Sewanee, Tennessee.

=== Rector at Trinity Church ===
In 1922 he became rector of Trinity Church in Columbia, South Carolina, a post he retained till 1938.

=== Bishop of Southwestern Virginia ===
In 1938 he was elected Bishop of Southwestern Virginia and was consecrated on September 27, 1938, by Presiding Bishop Henry St. George Tucker. He retired on March 24, 1954, 15 months before his death.
