= René A. Messa =

American football fullback

Profile
- Positions: Halfback, Fullback

Personal information
- Born: c. 1882; Santiago, Cuba

Career information
- College: LSU (1904–1905); Havana (1907)

Awards and highlights
- All-Southern (1904)

René A. Messa was a college football player. He was a prominent running back for the LSU Tigers of Louisiana State University, selected All-Southern in 1904. He later played for the University of Havana, which played LSU in the Bacardi Bowl in 1907. He also punted.
