= LeRoy Abernethy =

American football player (1885–1959)

LeRoy Franklin Abernethy
North Carolina Tar Heels
- Position: Fullback

Personal information
- Born: September 27, 1885; Hickory, North Carolina
- Died: November 9, 1959 (aged 74); Asheville, North Carolina

Career information
- College: North Carolina A&M (1902–04); North Carolina (1905)

Awards and highlights
- All-Southern (1904, 1905); All-time UNC team

LeRoy Franklin Abernethy (September 27, 1885 – November 9, 1959) was an American college football player from North Carolina. He played for North Carolina A&M from 1902–04 before transferring to the University of North Carolina for 1905.

== NC State ==
=== 1902–1904 ===
Abernethy played first for North Carolina A&M, selected All-Southern by W. S. Kimberly in 1904.

== University of North Carolina ==
Abernethy was a prominent fullback for the North Carolina Tar Heels football team of the University of North Carolina. He was selected for the position on an all-time Carolina football team of Dr. R. B. Lawson in 1934. On the all time team of Joel Whitaker he was noted as the "probably the best line plunger that has ever been."

=== 1905 ===
He was selected All-Southern by coach R. R. Brown of Washington and Lee University. A fullback did not score three touchdowns again for UNC until Mike Faulkerson in 1992.

== Later life ==
By 1910, Abernethy was engaged in the hardware business in his hometown of Hickory.

He later moved to Asheville, where he was a PurÖl distributor and then owner of the Hall-Sell Petroleum Carrier company. During World War II, he helped organize Petroleum Carriers Associates, an emergency oil transport unit, originally named the War Emergency Cooperative Association. In 1941, he married Frieda Burnett Russell in 1941.

He died in an Asheville hospital in 1959 after suffering a heart attack at home.
