= Ephraim Kirby-Smith =

American football player (1884–1938)

Profile
- Position: Tackle/Guard

Personal information
- Born: August 30, 1884; Sewanee, Tennessee
- Died: July 8, 1938 (aged 53); Sewanee, Tennessee
- Listed weight: 156 lb (71 kg)

Career information
- College: Sewanee (1903–1906)

Awards and highlights
- All-Southern (1903, 1904); All-Time Sewanee football team

Ephraim Kirby-Smith (August 30, 1884 – July 8, 1938) was a college football player.

== Early life ==
Kirby-Smith was born on August 30, 1884, in Sewanee, Tennessee, the son of American Civil War general Edmund Kirby Smith and his wife Cassie Selden. Edmund Kirby Smith's brother Ephraim, for whom his son was presumably named, died in 1847 from wounds suffered at the Battle of Molino del Rey.

== College football ==
Kirby-Smith was a lineman for the college football team of the Sewanee Tigers, selected to its all-time football team. He was selected All-Southern in 1903 and 1904. At Sewanee he was a member of Phi Delta Theta.
