= T. S. Sims =

American football player

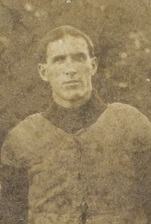
- Sims in football uniform, c. 1905

Profile
- Position: Guard

Personal information
- Born: Birmingham, Alabama

Career information
- College: Alabama (1905–1906)

Awards and highlights
- All-Southern (1905)

T. S. Sims was a college football player.

== Alabama ==
Sims was a prominent guard for the Alabama Crimson White of the University of Alabama.

=== 1905 ===
Sims scored in the opening win of 17 to 0 over Maryville in 1905. A number of Alabama turnovers kept the game scoreless through halftime. Sims scored the first touchdown and Auxford Burks added a 95-yard return for a touchdown. Sims also scored the first touchdown of the 30 to 0 victory over Auburn in what was then the largest crowd ever to see a game in Birmingham (4,000) with an 18-yard run. He was selected All-Southern in 1905.

=== 1906 ===
In 1906, Auburn protested he was an illegal player. The protest was heard by the Southern Intercollegiate Athletic Association, but it was denied.
