= Blanca Errázuriz =

Chilean socialite who was acquitted of murder

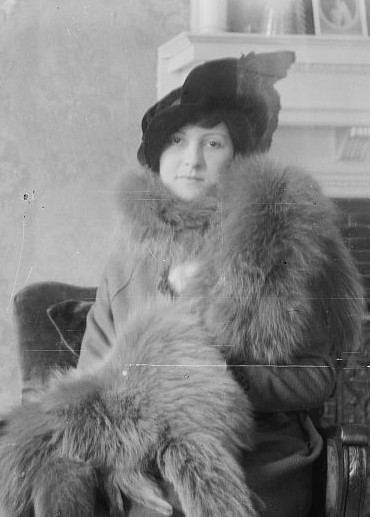
- c. 1910-1915
- Born: Blanca Elena Errázuriz Vergara; 9 April 1894; Viña del Mar, Chile
- Died: 20 March 1940 (aged 45); Viña del Mar, Chile
- Education: Sacred Heart Convent
- Spouses: John de Saulles (m. 1911; div. 1916) Fernando Santa Cruz Wilson (m. 1921, divorced)
- Children: 1

Blanca Elena Errázuriz Vergara (9 April 1894 – 20 March 1940), also known as Bianca de Saulles, was a Chilean socialite and the former wife of football player and businessman John de Saulles. In August 1917, Errázuriz fatally shot de Saulles multiple times during a disagreement over the custody of their son. After a highly publicized and sensational trial, Errázuriz was acquitted of her ex-husband's murder.

== Early life and marriage ==
Errázuriz was born in Viña del Mar, Chile, the eldest daughter of Guillermo Errázuriz Urmeneta and of Blanca Vergara Alvarez, a beauty known as the Star of Santiago, and thus a member of the politically influential Errázuriz family, of Basque descent. Her father, a mining magnate, died when she was two, and she was educated at Sacred Heart Convent in London, England. In 1911, when she was 16 years old, she met John de Saulles, an American businessman and society figure 15 years her senior; he had travelled to Chile as representative of the South American Concessions Syndicate to negotiate a new railway line. After some initial difficulties with her family (mostly due to the difference in age and religion as Errázuriz was Roman Catholic) they were soon engaged. On 14 December 1911, they were married at an English Catholic chapel in Paris, France. (The civil ceremony had taken place the previous day.).

De Saulles had previously been engaged to the heiresses Mary Elsie Moore (later Princess Torlonia) and Eleanor Granville Brown. He was later briefly appointed as U. S. Minister to Uruguay in 1914, a post he resigned shortly after accepting and without ever leaving the U.S. The newly married couple settled in New York City. They had one child, John Longer "Jack" de Saulles, born on 25 December 1912, and for whom the steel magnate Charles H. Schwab stood as godfather. Shortly after John, Jr's birth, the couple's marriage began to falter mainly due to de Saulles' well known infidelities. Errázuriz filed for divorce in the summer of 1916.

== The divorce ==
Shortly before filing for divorce, Errázuri befriended future actor Rudolph Valentino in New York City. Valentino was then working as an exhibition dancer (taxi dancer) and had gained attention for his rendition of the Argentine tango, which was the craze at the time. Whether the two actually had a romantic relationship is unknown, but Valentino did agree to provide proof in court during the de Saulles' divorce case that Joan Sawyer, his dancing partner, was having an adulterous relationship with John de Saulles; he himself took the stand to support Errázuriz's claim of de Saulle's infidelities. De Saulles was also accused of various financial improprieties involving his misuse of his wife's fortune, claims that received greater validity when it became clear upon his death that de Saulles was deeply in debt.

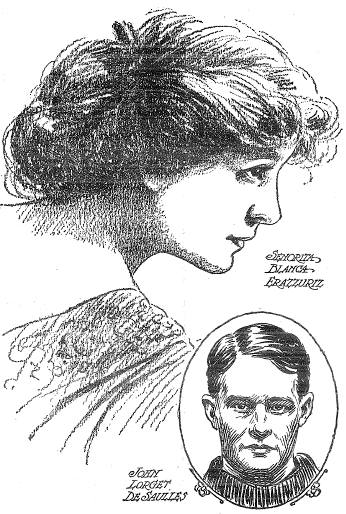
Blanca Errázuriz and John de Saulles (1912)

John de Saulles was not pleased with this, and once the divorce was granted in December 1916, he used his political connections to have Valentino arrested along with a madam named Mrs. Thyme (the exact charges are unknown). The evidence was flimsy at best (Valentino having been near the wrong place at the wrong time) and after a few days in jail, Valentino's bail was lowered from $10,000 to $1,500. The scandal and subsequent trial were highly publicized, and Valentino felt degraded and misused. No one would hire him, his old friends would no longer talk to him. Errázuriz did not thank him for his testimony and cut off all contact with him.

== The murder and trial ==
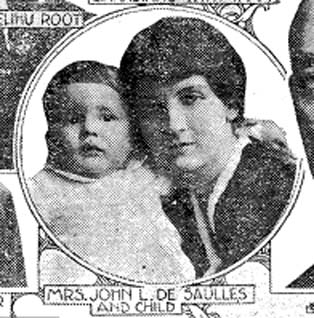
Blanca Errázuriz and son (1917)

Shortly after the divorce was final, on 3 August 1917, Errázuriz drove from her home in Roslyn, New York to the home of her ex-husband, The Box, in Meadowbrook Colony, near Westbury. She had legal claims over the custody of their son, since she and her husband had been given shared custody over him, but de Saulles refused to acknowledge the court's decision. She arrived at The Box shortly after 8pm, and found her former husband sitting on the porch of the house. They argued, and she pointed a gun at his head demanding him to immediately hand over the child to her. When he tried to disarm her, she shot him five times. He was rushed to the Nassau County Hospital, but died there at 10.20pm from his injuries. In the meantime, she awaited at the house for the arrival of the police, to whom she surrendered. She was charged with murder in the first degree and imprisoned in the Nassau County Jail at Mineola, New York, leading to a sensational trial.

The widely reported case went on for months. Errázuriz was defended by Henry Uterhart, a noted criminalist of the time, and the principal witness for the defense was Suzanne Monteau, Errázuriz's French maid, who had accompanied her that night and completely supported her version of the events. Blanca Errázuriz became the darling of the press, and the champion of the suffragettes who portrayed her as the victim of the chauvinism prevalent in the society of the time.

Blanca Errázuriz was unanimously acquitted of the murder charges on 1 December 1917 in what was called a "popular" verdict.

== Later years and death ==
Following the trial, Errázuriz moved to San Francisco where she sought and obtained full custody of her son. She and her son went later to Japan. Eventually she and her son returned to Chile and settled there. On 22 December 1921, she remarried, this time to engineer Fernando Santa Cruz Wilson in Santiago; the couple later divorced.

By the late 1930s, Errázuriz was suffering from poor health and had become estranged from her son, Jack Jr. He severed contact with his mother and moved back to the United States. On 20 March 1940, she committed suicide by taking an overdose of barbiturates at her home in Viña del Mar.

== Legacy ==
The case was the basis for the 1918 silent film The Woman and the Law, directed by Raoul Walsh. It featured Jack Connors, Miriam Cooper and Peggy Hopkins Joyce. (Guillermo Errázuriz, Blanca's diplomat brother, killed himself in Paris hotel in May 1922, after being spurned by Joyce.) The name "de Saulles" was changed to "La Salle" but the film's opening credits admit to being based on the story.
