= Reynolds Tichenor =

American football player, coach, and official (1877–1935)

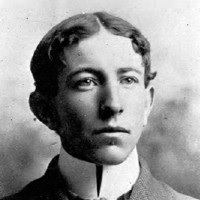
- Tichenor at the University of Georgia

Profile
- Position: Quarterback

Personal information
- Born: January 26, 1877; Alpine, Alabama, U.S.
- Died: November 16, 1935 (aged 58); Decatur, Georgia, U.S.
- Listed weight: 116 lb (53 kg)

Career information
- College: Auburn (1893–1896); Georgia (1897)

Awards and highlights
- First to score on hidden ball trick

Walker Reynolds "Tick" Tichenor (January 26, 1877 – November 16, 1935) was an American college football player, coach, and official, as well as a sportswriter and attorney.

Tichenor was a quarterback for John Heisman's Auburn Tigers of Auburn University and for the Georgia Bulldogs of the University of Georgia. As a player, Tichenor was one of the all-time best little men of the sport, weighing only 116 pounds.

== Early life ==
Walker Reynolds Tichenor was born on January 26, 1877, in Alpine, Alabama, the only son of Isaac Taylor Tichenor and Eppie Reynolds. His father Isaac was a pastor and president of the Agricultural and Mechanical College of Alabama, now known as Auburn University. Walker lived in Auburn, Alabama until he was four years old, then moved to Atlanta, Georgia. He played and watched baseball from a young age.

== College football ==
=== Auburn ===
Tichenor enrolled at Auburn University in 1893, and was a member of Kappa Alpha Order. He was captain of the 1896 Auburn Tigers football team, and returned to assist his alma mater in the 1910s. When coach Mike Donahue's health failed in 1911, Tichenor was largely responsible for Auburn's strong showing in holding Georgia to a scoreless tie, for which he was awarded a gold watch by the team. He also assisted the Southern Intercollegiate Athletic Association (SIAA) champion 1913, 1914, and 1919 Auburn teams.

==== 1895 ====
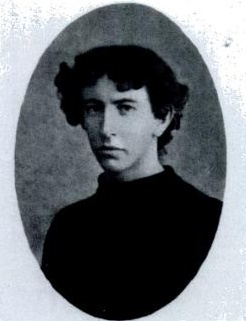
Tichenor at Auburn.

Tichenor once executed a "hidden ball trick" in the 1895 game against Vanderbilt as Auburn seemed to run a revolving wedge. Vanderbilt still won however, 9 to 6; the first time in the history of southern football that a field goal decided a game. "Billy" Williams recalled: I was playing left half for Auburn and Tichenor was quarterback. We were on Vandy's 15-yard line and had the ball in our possession. Tich passed the ball to me; I raised his jersey and hid the ball under it, at the same time dashing toward our right end, protected by several members of the Auburn team...Vandy thought I had the ball. Tich journeyed around his own left and went over the Vanderbilt's goal line. The first time the Vandy players knew Tich had the ball and had made a touchdown was when they saw him pulling the ball from under his jersey.

Tichenor described the nature of the play as follows:

The play was simply this. When the ball was snapped it went to a halfback. The play was closely massed and well screened. The halfback then thrust the ball under the back of my jersey. Then he would crash into the line. After the play I simply trotted away to a touchdown.

Innis Brown relates:

The game was played on a rather soft, slippery field, and it was exceedingly difficult to get a secure footing. According to "Tick's" own account, the runner could hear someone just behind him, and he expected every second to be thrown heavily from behind. He never faltered, however, and when at last he fell exhausted across the line, he discovered that one of his own men had been running just back of him to stop any tackler that might overtake him. His opponents were nowhere in sight.

==== 1896 ====
The Georgia–Auburn game of 1896 was a 12 to 6 victory by Georgia to finish its first undefeated season under Pop Warner. The game featured Tichenor's brilliant punt returns. Tichenor once said of the game that he had been sprawled on the ground, when a big Georgia lineman jumped at him, knees first, with Tichenor rolling out of the way just in time. "The fellow was very polite," Tichenor said. "We both got up and he apologized very profusely for having missed me."

=== University of Georgia ===
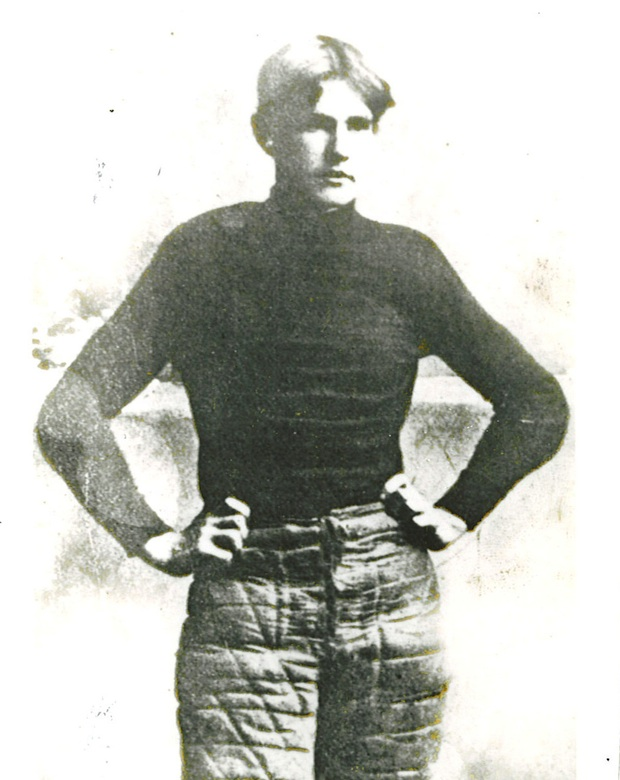
Tichenor was quarterback when Richard Von Albade Gammon (pictured) died.

Tichenor then transferred to the University of Georgia to attend law school, and was quarterback of the football team when Richard Von Albade Gammon met his death. "Von" had been quarterback the year before, and moved to fullback upon Tichenor's arrival.

The Atlanta Journal on Tichenor remarked: "He is a small man, pale-faced and slight. He doesn't weigh over 120 pounds with all his hair and padding. His voice is penetrating. He is never silent.... He guys, jeers, and encourages his team... or rushes in and makes a brilliant dash himself. It is worth a trip to Athens to hear him talk and see him play." He played second base on the baseball team.

=== Writer ===
Fuzzy Woodruff on All-Southern selections relates: "The first selections that had any pretense of being backed by a judicial consideration were made by W. Reynolds Tichenor, old-time Auburn quarterback, who had kept in intimate contact with football through being a sought after official."

=== Official ===
For ten years Tichenor was a member of the Southern Football Officials Association. One publication called him the "Emergency Football Man of the South." "Whenever a coach is taken sick, Tichenor is called upon to take his place. Whenever an emergency official is needed, Tich comes to the rescue."

== Attorney ==
After football Tichenor was an attorney in Atlanta.

== College basketball ==
Tichenor was the timekeeper for every Southern Conference basketball tournament from 1921 to 1932. Ralph McGill relates how Tichenor used a pistol to end games:

In all the clamor about the place it is impossible to pipe up on a whistle or horn to end the game. So they ended with a pistol shot. In the first tournament held Tick Tichnor (sic) was timing a game in which Georgia was playing. The rival team led by one point as the gun boomed.

There was a John Law in the place and he came galloping over and seized Tick Tichnor, who still held the smoking rod in one hand, 'I arrest you,' he said, 'for shooting in a public place.'

The copper was a large one and he held the rather slight Tick Tichnor in a firm grasp. What made it worse was that Mr. H.J. Stegeman, the Georgia coach, felt that he had been severely wounded by the gun going off with his team one point behind. So he charged that Mr. Tichenor had shot him in the leg.

It was some time before Mr. Al Doonan and Coach W.A. Alexander could persuade the copper that it was alright to have a man flourish his artillery and let it boom all over the place.

== Death ==
Tichenor died on November 16, 1935, at his home in rural Decatur, Georgia. His health had been failing since 1929 when he was stricken ill officiating the Georgia–Yale game in Athens, Georgia.

== See also ==
- Deep South's Oldest Rivalry
- Chigger Browne
