= Gene Oliver (American football) =

American football player

South Carolina Gamecocks
- Position: Halfback

Career information
- College: South Carolina (1904)

Awards and highlights
- All-Southern (1904)

Gene Oliver was a college football player for the South Carolina Gamecocks. A running back and captain of the 1904 team, he played an entire game against Georgia with a broken jaw. Oliver also made All-Southern.
