= Hillsman Taylor =

- Born: August 4, 1884; Trenton, Tennessee, U.S.
- Died: November 1, 1965 (aged 81); Tennessee, U.S.
- Other name: Red
- Occupation: Lawyer
- Football career

Profile
- Position: Tackle

Personal information
- Listed height: 6 ft 1 in (1.85 m)
- Listed weight: 182 lb (83 kg)

Career information
- College: Vanderbilt (1904–1905)

Awards and highlights
- SIAA championship (1904, 1905); All-Southern (1904, 1905); 1912 All-time Vandy 2nd team

Matthew Hillsman "Red" Taylor (August 4, 1884 – November 1, 1965) was an attorney and politician, serving as a state representative and Speaker of the House in Tennessee. He played college football at Vanderbilt University. He later became a prominent attorney in St. Louis, Missouri and Memphis, Tennessee. His children included Peter Matthew Hillsman Taylor, who became a Pulitzer Prize-winning author.

== Early life ==
Matthew Hillsman Taylor was born on August 4, 1884, in Trenton, Tennessee to Robert Zachery Taylor and America Clementine "Mettie" Ivey. Matthew was named after a long-time local Baptist pastor, Matthew Hillsman. Robert Taylor had fought for the Confederate Army as a private under Nathan Bedford Forrest. While working as an attorney for the West Tennessee Land Company, he was kidnapped in October 1908 along with Quentin Rankin and shot by Night Riders near Reelfoot Lake. He escaped by swimming across the lake. Rankin was lynched, shot and hanged by the mob.

== Vanderbilt University ==
Taylor was an All-Southern tackle for Dan McGugin's Vanderbilt Commodores of Vanderbilt University, selected for a 2nd team All-Time Vanderbilt football team in 1912,

He married Katherine Baird Taylor, from eastern Tennessee. Her father, Robert Love Taylor, was a politician who served three times as governor of Tennessee and as US Senator from the state.

== Speaker of the Tennessee House ==
Taylor was elected to the Tennessee House of Representatives, serving several terms. He was elected as Speaker of the House in 1909.

== Insurance ==
In 1926 Taylor was elected vice president of the Missouri State Life Insurance Company of St. Louis He later returned to Tennessee, working in Memphis.
