= John Owsley Manier =

American physician

Owsley Manier
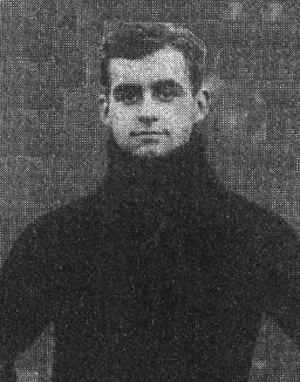
- Manier c. 1906

Vanderbilt Commodores
- Positions: Fullback, halfback
- Class: 1907

Personal information
- Born: March 18, 1887; Nashville, Tennessee, U.S.
- Died: September 1, 1956 (aged 69); Nashville, Tennessee, U.S.
- Listed height: 6 ft 2 in (1.88 m)
- Listed weight: 166 lb (75 kg)

Career information
- High school: Wallace University School
- College: Vanderbilt (1904–1906); Penn (1908)

Awards and highlights
- National champion (1908); SIAA championship (1904, 1905, 1906); All-Southern (1904, 1905, 1906); Third-team All-American (1906); 1912 All-time Vandy 1st team; 1934 All-time Vandy team

John Owsley Manier (March 18, 1887 – September 1, 1956) was an American college football player and coach and physician. He played at Vanderbilt University as a Fullback from 1904 to 1906 and at the University of Pennsylvania in 1908 as a halfback. Manier was a third-team selection on the 1906 College Football All-America Team and was named to the College Football All-Southern Team in 1904, 1905, and 1906. After graduating from Penn with a medical degree, he return to Vanderbilt and an assistant medical professor and assistant football coach.

== Early life ==
J. Owsley Manier was born on March 18, 1887, in Nashville, Tennessee, to William R. Manier and Mary Owsley.

== Vanderbilt University ==
Manier enrolled at Vanderbilt University, was an excellent student and received his A. B. degree in 1907.

=== Football ===
Manier was a prominent fullback on coach Dan McGugin's Vanderbilt Commodores football team from 1904 to 1906, joining the team in McGugin's first year as head coach. He was a "great plunging back" who in which every year he played at Vanderbilt was both a member of Southern Intercollegiate Athletic Association (SIAA) championship teams and selected All-Southern. In 1915, John Heisman said Vanderbilt's three greatest players ever were Manier, Ray Morrison, and Bob Blake.

==== 1906 ====
Manier scored five touchdowns against Alabama in a 78–0 victory and again ran for five touchdowns over Georgia Tech (37–6) in Atlanta. Atlanta Constitution sportswriter Alex Lynn wrote after the Georgia Tech game, Manier was "the greatest fullback and all round man ever seen in Atlanta." Manier played in the days before two platoons and so also played on defense. In the 33–0 win over Rose Polytechnic, in which again he scored five touchdowns, he also "probably prevented the visitors from scoring by his clever defensive work." Manier was the first Vanderbilt football player to be selected to an All-America team; selected third-team All-America by Walter Camp in 1906. This makes Manier the first Southern player to make any of Camp's teams.

== University of Pennsylvania ==
He received a Bachelor of Arts from Vanderbilt, and his M. D. from the University of Pennsylvania.

=== 1908 ===
He played a bit on the Penn Quakers football team as well, in 1908, for he had a year of eligibility left. "But his effectiveness at Pennsylvania was lessened by the attempt of the coaches to change his style of bucking a line from the low, plunging dive to running into it erect, knees drawn high and great dependence upon his companion backs to "hike" him." At Penn he was shifted to halfback, and mostly used for swift plunges into the line. Penn defeated Michigan, exacting revenge for the multiple losses suffered by Manier to Michigan at Vanderbilt.

== Coaching and medical practice ==
After his time in Pennsylvania he returned to Vanderbilt as an assistant football coach and assistant medical professor. He practiced in Nashville and gave his spare time to the team. Known years with his assistance include 1911 to 1915 and 1920.

=== Medicine ===
Manier spent the winter of 1911 at the University of Pennsylvania Hospital. He accompanied the Vanderbilt hospital unit to Fort McPherson in 1917. In 1935 he was president of the Tennessee Medical Association.

== Illness and death ==
In 1948, Manier developed coronary thrombosis, as well as legions on his legs while vacationing in Norway in 1952. He had a vocal cord removed, and finally an embolism in January 1953 which confined him to his home for his remaining years. Manier died on September 1, 1956, at his home in Nashville. The Nashville Banner reported his death in 1956: "Vanderbilt University loved him, and no alma mater has been better served by an alumnus."
