= Sam Y. Parker =

American football and baseball player (1880–1906)

Profile
- Position: Fullback

Personal information
- Born: May 12, 1880
- Died: July 5, 1906 (aged 26); Helenwood, Tennessee

Career information
- College: Tennessee (1903–1905)

Awards and highlights
- All-Southern (1904)

Samuel Epps Young Parker (May 12, 1880 – July 5, 1906) was a college football and baseball player for the Tennessee Volunteers of the University of Tennessee. He was a member of Chi Delta. He was a fullback on the football team. Nash Buckingham selected Parker All-Southern in 1904. Parker was shot by lawyer James E. Fulton on July 5, 1906, as he stepped off a train in Helenwood. Fulton alleged his wife had been having an affair with Parker. Fulton later also died from a gunshot.
