= Irish Graham =

American football player (1883–1940)

Profile
- Positions: Tackle, guard

Personal information
- Born: November 7, 1883; Nashville, Tennessee, U.S.
- Died: April 12, 1940 (aged 56); Nashville, Tennessee, U.S.
- Listed height: 6 ft 1 in (1.85 m)
- Listed weight: 172 lb (78 kg)

Career information
- High school: Bowen School
- College: Vanderbilt (1902–1904)

Awards and highlights
- SIAA championship (1903, 1904); All-Southern (1904)

Thomas Bennett "Irish" Graham Jr. (November 7, 1883 – April 12, 1940) was an American college football player.

== Vanderbilt University ==
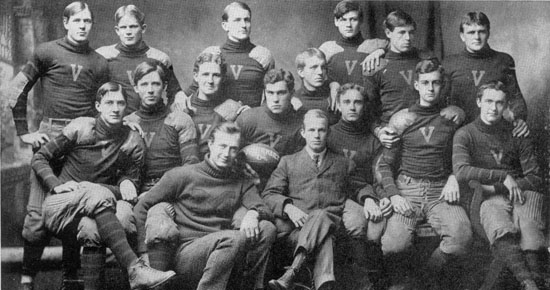
1904 Vanderbilt football team. Graham is in the middle with the football.

Graham was a prominent tackle for the Vanderbilt Commodores football teams. He stood 6 feet 1 inch and weighed 172 pounds.

=== 1904 ===
Graham was captain of the undefeated, Southern Intercollegiate Athletic Association champion 1904 team coached by Dan McGugin in his first year. He was selected All-Southern by various publications. Graham graduated in 1905 with a B.S. in physics.
