= Lob Brown =

American football player

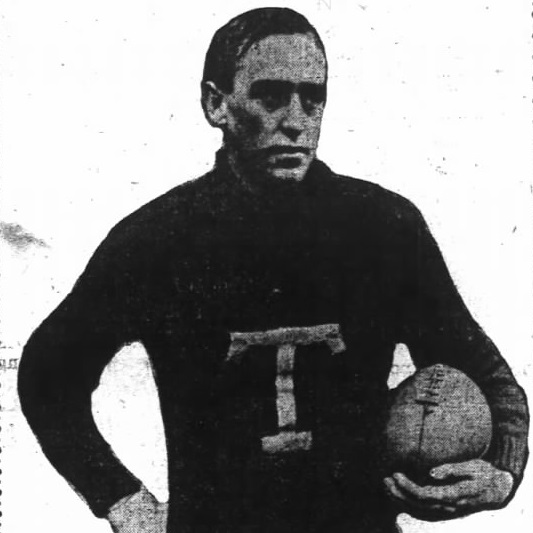
- Brown c. 1906

Profile
- Position: Tackle

Personal information
- Born: c. 1883; Chattanooga, Tennessee
- Listed height: 5 ft 10 in (1.78 m)
- Listed weight: 178 lb (81 kg)

Career information
- College: Georgia Tech (1904–1906)

Awards and highlights
- All-Southern (1904, 1906); Georgia Tech Athletics Hall of Fame

William S. "Lob" or "Lobster" Brown was a college football player.

== Georgia Tech ==
Brown was a prominent tackle for the Georgia Tech Golden Tornado of the Georgia Institute of Technology. He came from Chattanooga, Tennessee. He was elected to the Georgia Tech Athletics Hall of Fame in 1966. In 1915 John Heisman selected him one of the 30 greatest Southern football players.

=== 1904 ===
Brown was selected All-Southern in 1904. Some publications claim he was Tech's first All-Southern player; others list Jesse Thrash.

=== 1906 ===
He also kicked, responsible for the win over Davidson by a 40-yard field goal. Brown also helped Tech to its first defeat over Auburn in 1906. He was captain-elect of 1907.

=== 1909 ===
Brown played for Texas A&M with Frank Shipp.
