= Billy Wilson (running back) =

American football player

Profile
- Positions: Halfback, end

Personal information
- Born: Hampton, Georgia
- Listed height: 5 ft 3 in (1.60 m)
- Listed weight: 160 lb (73 kg)

Career information
- College: Georgia Tech (1904–1905)

Awards and highlights
- All-Southern (1904)

W. "Billy" Wilson was a college football player. He was a prominent running back and end for coach John Heisman's Georgia Tech Yellow Jackets of the Georgia Institute of Technology, selected All-Southern in 1904. He was captain-elect of 1906.
