= John Beverly Pollard =

American football player, coach, and surgeon (1880–1960)

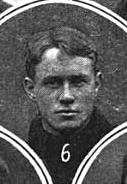
- Pollard c. 1903

Profile
- Position: Quarterback

Personal information
- Born: November 9, 1880; Aylett, Virginia, U.S.
- Died: October 2, 1960 (aged 79); Annapolis, Maryland, U.S.
- Listed weight: 145 lb (66 kg)

Career information
- College: Virginia (1902–1905)

Awards and highlights
- Southern championship (1902); All-Southern (1902, 1903, 1904)

John Beverly Pollard (November 9, 1880 – October 2, 1960) was an American college football player and coach and surgeon in the Medical Corps of the United States Navy.

== Early life ==
Pollard was born on November 9, 1880, in Aylett, Virginia, to E. S. Pollard, Esq.

== University of Virginia ==
Pollard was an All-Southern quarterback for the Virginia Cavaliers of the University of Virginia, and a member of the Virginia Glee Club. He also played on the baseball teams. At Virginia he was a member of Kappa Sigma fraternity. Pollard was known for his speed. He mentored the backup Oscar Randolph. He was once University Demonstrator of Anatomy. After university he became a captain and surgeon in the US Navy Medical Corps.

== Coaching career ==
Pollard coached Virginia's baseball team in 1906. He served as a co-head football coach at Davidson College in Davidson, North Carolina from 1906 to 1907.

== Head coaching record ==
=== Football ===
Year	Team	Overall	Conference	Standing	Bowl/playoffs
Davidson (Independent) (1906–1907)
1906	Davidson	3–2–2			
1907	Davidson	4–1–1			
Davidson:		7–3–3			
Total:		7–3–3			
