= Roach Stewart =

American football player and attorney (1881–1948)

- Born: January 28, 1881; Lancaster, South Carolina, US
- Died: March 16, 1948 (aged 67); Columbia, South Carolina, US
- Occupation: attorney
- Football career

North Carolina Tar Heels
- Position: Center

Career information
- College: North Carolina (1902–1904)

Awards and highlights
- All-Southern (1904)

Roach Sidney Stewart (January 28, 1881 – March 16, 1948) was a college football player and attorney. A native of Lancaster, South Carolina, he was the town's mayor from 1918 to 1922. He attended the University of North Carolina at Chapel Hill, where he co-founded the Order of the Golden Fleece, the oldest honorary society at the university. As a member of the Tar Heels football team, Stewart was an All-Southern center.
