= Dan Blake =

American football player and coach (1882–1953)

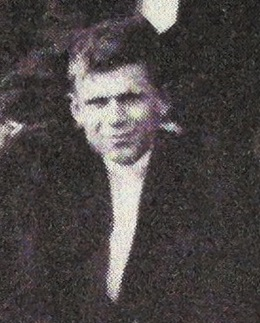
- Blake cropped from the 1906 team picture

Profile
- Position: Halfback

Personal information
- Born: May 22, 1882; Cuero, Texas, U.S.
- Died: September 7, 1953 (aged 71); Gary, Indiana, U.S.
- Listed height: 5 ft 11 in (1.80 m)
- Listed weight: 165 lb (75 kg)

Career information
- High school: Bowen School
- College: Vanderbilt (1903–1906)

Awards and highlights
- SIAA championship (1904, 1905, 1906); All-Southern (1904, 1905, 1906)

Daniel Bigelow Blake Jr. (May 22, 1882 – September 7, 1953) was an American football player and coach.

== Early life ==
Blake was born on May 22, 1882, in Cuero, Texas, to Daniel Bigelow Blake Sr. and Mary Clara Weldon. Dan Sr. was a physician and once president of the Nashville Academy of Medicine.

== College career ==
Blake was a prominent halfback and end for Dan McGugin's Vanderbilt Commodores football teams from 1903 to 1906, winning multiple Southern Intercollegiate Athletic Association (SIAA) titles. His two brothers, Bob and Vaughan, also played on those teams. Dan, Bob, and Vaughan were captains of the 1906, 1907, and 1908 Vanderbilt teams respectively. Dan Blake was selected consensus All-Southern in 1906. At Vanderbilt he was a member of Kappa Sigma fraternity and stood 5 feet 11 and weighed some 165 pounds.

Blake played end in 1903, the same position as his brother, Bob.

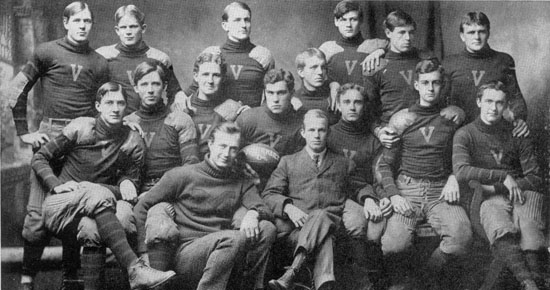
1904 Vanderbilt Commodores football team. Dan is top row, second from left

One writer in 1904 still contended Blake, who "played left half for Vanderbilt, '04, being taken from left end, which position he played in '03. End is his position; he is heavy, weighing about 170, is fast, a good tackler, advances the ball well, and is a fair punter."

Blake was captain of the 1906 team, considered one of the school's greatest. Dan made the field goal to tie Michigan 4 to 4, a score that would remain until the final two minutes saw a Michigan touchdown.

== Later life ==
Blake went on to coach at Hopkinsville High School at Hopkinsville, Kentucky. While there he was manager of the electric light and gas plants of the Kentucky Public Service Company.
