= Robert C. Patterson =

American football player and coach

Profile
- Position: Center

Personal information
- Born: May 11, 1883; Tennessee
- Died: October 7, 1952; Minnesota
- Listed height: 5 ft 11 in (1.80 m)
- Listed weight: 177 lb (80 kg)

Career information
- College: Vanderbilt (1903–1905)

Awards and highlights
- SIAA championship (1904, 1905); All-Southern (1905)

Robert Clendening "Emma" Patterson (May 11, 1883 – October 7, 1952) was a college football player, coach, and attorney. He moved to Houston, where he was a member of the firm of Fouts, Amerson, Patterson, & Moore. He then practiced law as a solo practitioner.

== Vanderbilt University ==
He was a prominent center for Dan McGugin's Vanderbilt Commodores of Vanderbilt University from 1903 to 1905.

=== 1904 ===
Patterson played in McGugin's first year of 1904.

=== 1905 ===
He was selected All-Southern in 1905.

== Coaching ==
He coached at the Georgia Military Academy, and in 1908 returned as an assistant to Vanderbilt.
