= Humphrey Foy =

American football player (1886–1956)

Profile
- Position: Fullback/Tackle

Personal information
- Born: July 4, 1886; Eufaula, Alabama, U.S.
- Died: May 2, 1956 (aged 69); Eufaula, Alabama, U.S.
- Listed weight: 205 lb (93 kg)

Career information
- College: Auburn (1903–1906)

Awards and highlights
- All-Southern (1904)

William Humphrey Foy (July 4, 1886 – May 2, 1956) was a college football player.

== Alabama Polytechnic ==
Foy was a prominent fullback for the Auburn Tigers of Alabama Polytechnic Institute. The Auburn media guide also lists his position as a tackle.

=== 1903 ===
He was injured in the 1903 season, suffering a broken collarbone.

=== 1904 ===
He made the All-Southern team in 1904, Mike Donahue's first season as head coach. Auburn was the undefeated SIAA co-champion with Vanderbilt and its first year coach Dan McGugin. He was the second Auburn player ever selected All-Southern, behind only James Elmer.
