= Ira Johnson =

American football player and coach (1880–1950)

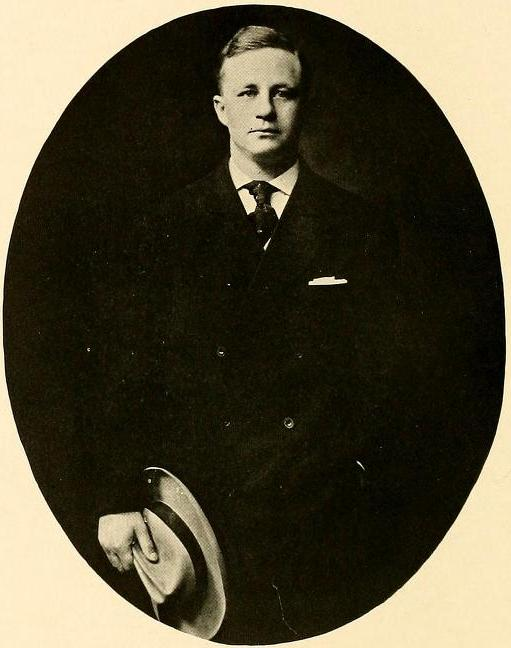

Biographical details
- Born: September 17, 1880
- Died: November 30, 1950 (aged 70); Richmond, Virginia, U.S.

Playing career
- 1900–1901: VMI
- 1902–1904: Virginia
- Positions: Tackle, guard

Coaching career (HC unless noted)
- 1905–1906: VMI
- 1907–1908: Virginia (assistant)

Head coaching record
- Overall: 6–9–1

Accomplishments and honors

Awards
- 4× All-Southern (1901–1904)

Ira Branch Johnson (September 17, 1880 – November 30, 1950) was an American college football player and coach. He was the seventh head football coach at the Virginia Military Institute (VMI) in Lexington, Virginia, serving for two seasons, from 1905 to 1906, and compiling a record of 6–9–1.

During World War I, Johnson served as Captain, Battery C, 111th Field Artillery, 29th Division, prior to his discharge on June 11, 1918. He later worked as an assistant superintendent at the assembly plant in the Bartlett-Hayward industrial complex, an important Baltimore manufacturer.

At the time of his death, he was a municipal judge in Richmond, Virginia. He was married at least twice, to Mary Louise Herbert in 1906 and later to Jeanne Boutin.

Born in Woodville, North Carolina, he was the brother of Hammond Johnson.

== Head coaching record ==
Year	Team	Overall	Conference	Standing	Bowl/playoffs
VMI Keydets (Independent) (1905–1906)
1905	VMI	2–5–1			
1906	VMI	4–4			
VMI:		6–9–1			
Total:		6–9–1			
