= Hammond Johnson =

American football player and sports coach (1883–1919)

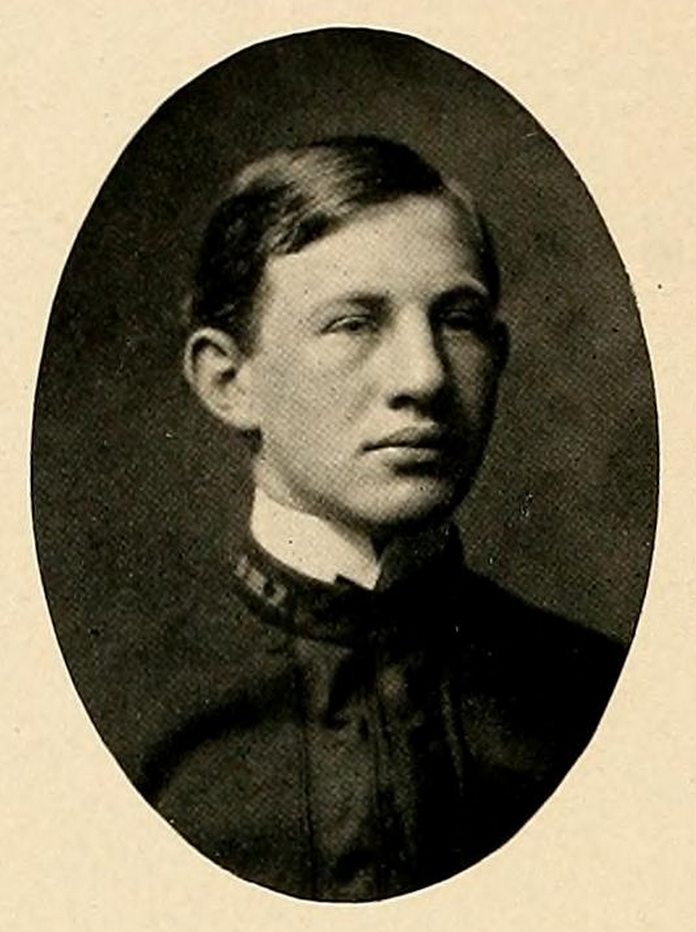
- Johnson pictured in The Bomb 1904, VMI yearbook

Biographical details
- Born: April 19, 1883; Woodville, North Carolina, U.S.
- Died: May 17, 1919 (aged 36) near Cochem, Germany
- Education: Virginia Military Institute (1904); University of Virginia (1907)

Playing career

Football
- 1901–1903: VMI
- 1904–1906: Virginia
- Position: Halfback

Coaching career (HC unless noted)

Football
- 1907: Virginia
- 1908–1909: Virginia (assistant)

Baseball
- 1908: Georgia

Head coaching record
- Overall: 6–3–1 (football); 20–2 (baseball)

Accomplishments and honors

Awards
- All-Southern (1904)

Edward Hammond Johnson (April 19, 1883 – May 17, 1919) was an American football player and coach of football and baseball. He served as the head football coach at the University of Virginia for one season in 1907, compiling a record of 6–3–1. Johnson was also the head baseball coach at the University of Georgia for one season in 1908, tallying a mark of 20–2.

== Biography ==
Johnson was a native of Woodville, North Carolina. He graduated from the Virginia Military Institute (VMI) in 1904 and the University of Virginia School of Law. While in Athens, Georgia, on November 10, 1910, he married Anne Barrett Phinizy, daughter of Billups Phinizy and Nellie G. Stovall, and then went to Norfolk, Virginia to make his home. He practiced law in Norfolk until America entered World War I.

In 1917, Johnson returned to Athens to enlist in the United States Army and was sent to officer's training school at Fort McPherson in Atlanta, where on August 15, 1917, he was commissioned a major. He saw service at Camp Gordon, near Atlanta, Camp Upton in New York, and in Boston, Massachusetts, before being ordered to France on May 1, 1918, as a battalion commander in 328th Infantry, 164th Brigade, 82nd Division, American Expeditionary Forces (AEF).

During the Meuse-Argonne Offensive, Major Johnson was severely wounded, gassed, and he received a bad case of shell shock, which left him deaf in one ear. Released from the hospital after the Armistice, he was reassigned to Headquarters, 112th Infantry, 56th Brigade, 28th Division, IV Army Corps, AEF. While serving as assistant inspector general in the American Army of Occupation, based near Cochem, Germany, Johnson died of apoplexy.

Although he was immediately buried in Cochem, his body was later returned to the United States and he was re-interred in Arlington National Cemetery. His marker has date of death as May 19, 1919, but this was the date of his original burial in Germany.

== Head coaching record ==
=== Football ===
Year	Team	Overall	Conference	Standing	Bowl/playoffs
Virginia Orange and Blue (South Atlantic Intercollegiate Athletic Association) (1907)
1907	Virginia	6–3–1			
Virginia:		6–3–1			
Total:		6–3–1			
