= Frank Kyle =

American football player and coach (1882–1929)

Biographical details
- Born: May 23, 1882; Clay County, Tennessee, U.S.
- Died: October 22, 1929 (aged 47); Clay County, Tennessee, U.S.

Playing career
- 1902–1905: Vanderbilt
- Position: Quarterback

Coaching career (HC unless noted)
- 1908: Ole Miss

Head coaching record
- Overall: 3–5

Accomplishments and honors

Awards
- All-Southern (1905); All-time Vandy 2nd team (1912)

Frank "Stitch" Kyle (May 23, 1882 – October 22, 1929) was an American college football player and coach.

== Early years ==
He attended preparatory school at Mooney School in Franklin, Tennessee along with Red Smith and Ed Hamilton.

== Vanderbilt University ==
Kyle played for the Vanderbilt Commodores of Vanderbilt University from 1902 to 1905. He was the first quarterback to play for Dan McGugin's Commodores, selected for All-Southern teams in 1903 and 1904. He stood 5 feet 11 inches and weighed 162 pounds.

== Coaching career ==
=== Ole Miss ===
Kyle served as the head football coach at the University of Mississippi (Ole Miss) in 1908. During his one-season tenure at Mississippi, Kyle compiled an overall record of three wins and five losses (3–5).

== Later life ==
Kyle later lived in Celina, Tennessee and died in 1929.

== Head coaching record ==
Year	Team	Overall	Conference	Standing	Bowl/playoffs
Ole Miss Rebels (Southern Intercollegiate Athletic Association) (1908)
1908	Ole Miss	3–5	1–2	9th	
Ole Miss:		3–5	0–3		
Total:		3–5			
