= Innis Brown =

American football player, referee, sportswriter, and civil engineer

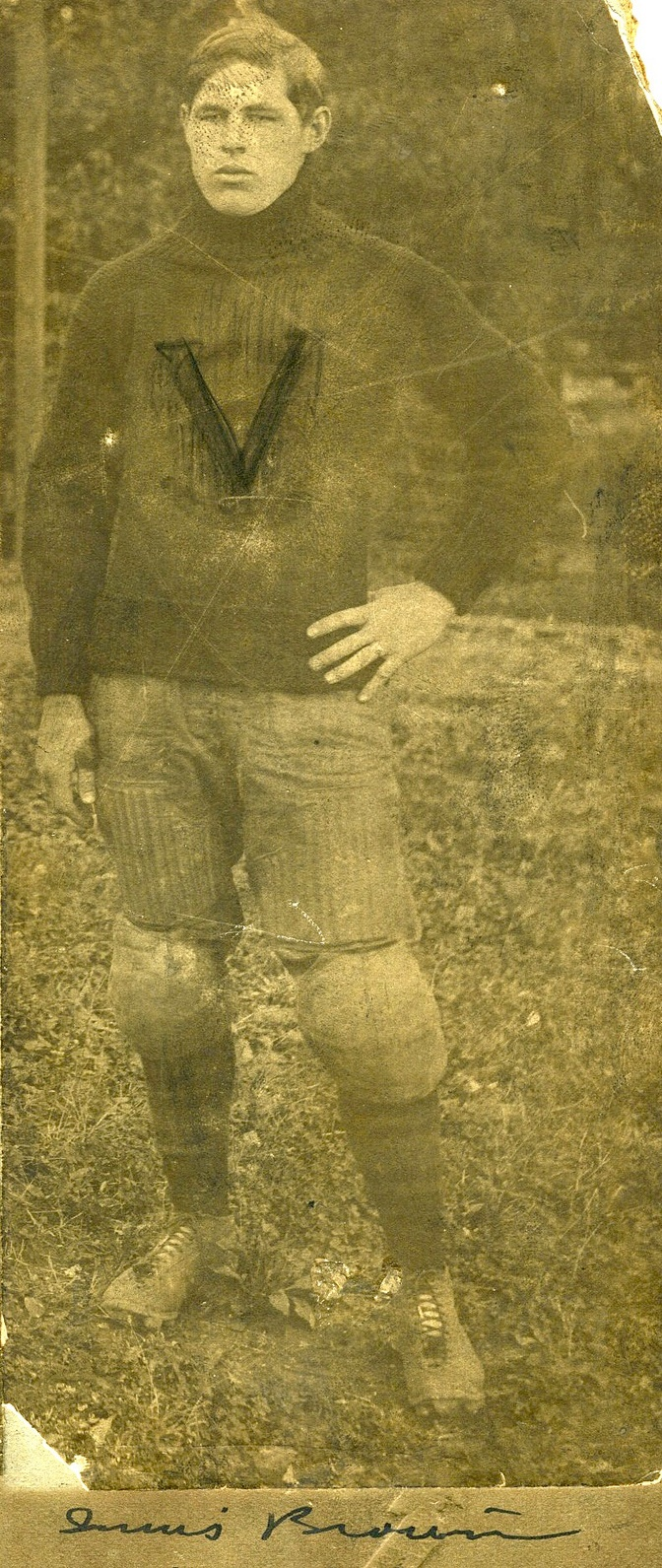
- Innis Brown (c. 1905)

Profile
- Position: Guard/End

Personal information
- Born: March 31, 1884; Franklin, Tennessee, U.S.
- Died: January 23, 1961 (aged 76); DeLeon Springs, Florida, U.S.
- Listed height: 5 ft 10 in (1.78 m)
- Listed weight: 166 lb (75 kg)

Career information
- High school: Mooney School
- College: Vanderbilt (1903–1905)

Awards and highlights
- SIAA championship (1904, 1905); All-Southern (1904, 1905)

Innis Brown (March 31, 1884 – January 23, 1961) was a college football player, referee, sportswriter, and civil engineer. His sports articles were nationally known, writing for the New York Sun and Hearst newspapers.

== Early life ==
Innis Brown was born on March 31, 1884, in Franklin, Tennessee, to Enoch Brown, Sr. and Lucinda Allen. Innis's younger brother Enock "Nuck" Brown was captain of the 1913 Vanderbilt Commodores football team. Both attended Mooney School.

== Vanderbilt University ==
Innis was a prominent guard for Dan McGugin's Vanderbilt Commodores football teams of Vanderbilt University. He was also a Rhodes Scholar.

=== 1905 ===
In 1905 Brown was captain and selected All-Southern of the 1905 team. One publication claims "The first scouting done in the South was in 1905, when Dan McGugin and Captain Innis Brown, of Vanderbilt went to Atlanta to see Sewanee play Georgia Tech."

=== 1906 ===
He spent the 1906 season as the head football coach at Southwestern Presbyterian University – now Rhodes College – in Clarksville, Tennessee.

== Mexico ==
Upon graduation, he went to Mexico as a civil engineer.

== Referee ==
By 1912 he was a referee throughout the South, chosen by the Atlanta Constitution to pick its All-Southern team that year.

== Sportswriter ==
Having served as editor on Vanderbilt's campus newspaper, the Hustler, Brown began his writing career on the old Nashville American in 1906. He eventually took charge of the sports section of the Atlanta Journal, succeeding his personal friend Grantland Rice.

=== Golf ===
Brown was also an avid golfer, being the managing editor of American Golfer in 1919 with Rice.
