= Ed Hamilton (American football) =

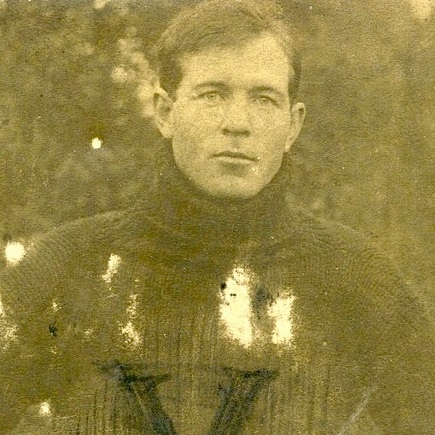
- Hamilton c. 1905

Biographical details
- Born: October 8, 1880; Enid, Mississippi, U.S.
- Education: Vanderbilt University

Playing career
- 1902–1905: Vanderbilt
- Positions: Forward, End (football), Second baseman

Coaching career (HC unless noted)
- 1903–1904: Vanderbilt (basketball)
- 1908–1909: Vanderbilt (basketball)
- 1909–1910: Vanderbilt (baseball)

Accomplishments and honors

Awards
- 2x All-Southern (1904, 1905)

Edward James Hamilton (October 8, 1880 – ?) was a college football, basketball, and baseball player and coach as well as an attorney. He attended preparatory school at Mooney School in Franklin, Tennessee along with Red Smith and Frank Kyle. Hamilton was born in Enid, Mississippi.

Hamilton was an All-Southern end for the first years of Dan McGugin's Vanderbilt Commodores football teams. He stood 5 feet 11 inches (1.80 m) and weighed 164 pounds (74 kg). He was an All-Southern second baseman on the baseball team. Hamilton coached the Vanderbilt basketball squad in 1903–1904 and 1908–09 for a combined record of 17–5.

Hamilton was the first to meet McGugin in Nashville, and has his law office next to his. Hamilton won Bachelor of Ugliness. He married Theresa Henderson, the daughter of judge John Henderson.
