= Fuzzy Woodruff =

American journalist

- Born: Lorenzo Ferguson Woodruff; May 27, 1884; Montgomery, Alabama, U.S.
- Died: December 7, 1929 (aged 45); Atlanta, Georgia, U.S.
- Education: University of Alabama
- Occupation: Sportswriter

Lorenzo Ferguson "Fuzzy" Woodruff (May 27, 1884 – December 7, 1929) was an early 20th-century American sportswriter known throughout most of the Southeast for his vivid writing. He was also a music and drama critic. He began his newspaper career as a member of the Montgomery Advertiser in 1907. Among the newspapers he served were the Birmingham News, the Birmingham Age-Herald, the New Orleans States, the Mobile Register, the New York Evening World, the Chicago Inter-Ocean, the Chicago Examiner, the St. Louis Dispatch, the Atlanta Constitution, the Atlanta Georgian, and the Atlanta Journal.

== College football ==
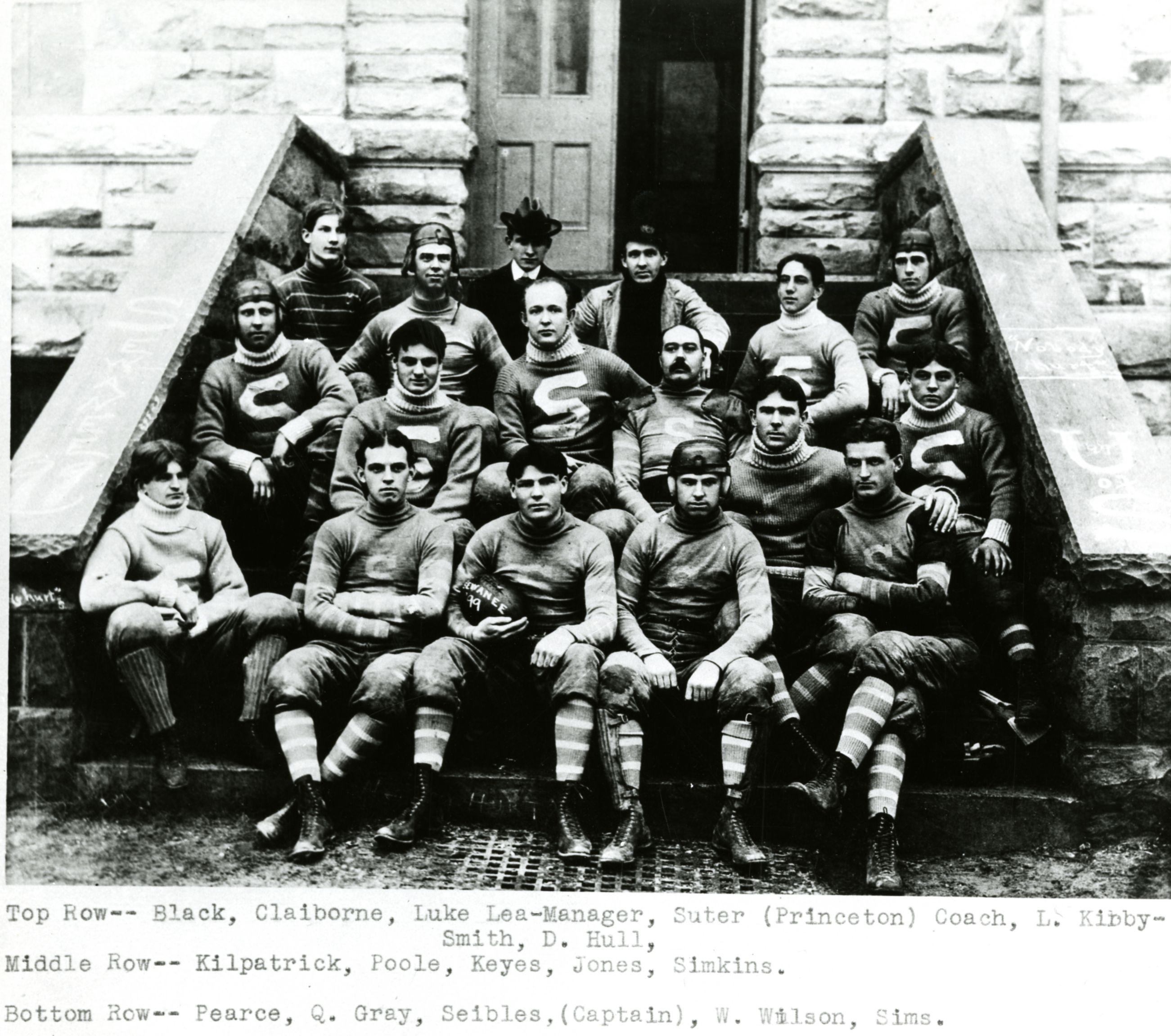
Sewanee's "Iron Men" of 1899

Recalling the only game in which the 'Iron Men' of the undefeated 1899 Sewanee Tigers football team, who won five road games in six days, were scored upon–by John Heisman's Auburn team in a close 11 to 10 win, Woodruff wrote:

Under Heisman's tutelage, Auburn played with a marvelous speed and dash that couldn't be gainsaid and which fairly swept Sewanee off its feet. Only the remarkable punting of Simkins kept the game from being a debacle.

I recall vividly one incident of the game, which demonstrates clearly just how surprising was Sewanee's victory.

The Purple was taking time out. They began this early in the game, when their athletes appeared tired and worn whereas Auburn men were full of fight and fire.

A Sewanee player was down, his head being bathed...Suter, the Sewanee coach, and Heisman, the Auburn mentory, were walking up and down the field together. They approached this boy. The rules were not as rigid then I guess against coaches encroaching on the field of play or conversing with player or anyhow they were not enforced for Suter, evidently as mad as fire, asked the down and out player 'Are you fellows going to be run over like this all afternoon?'

'Coach,' said the boy, lifting his tired head from the ground, 'we just can't stand this stuff. We've never seen anything like it.'

Suter and Heisman turned away. 'Can you beat that?' Suter asked the Auburn coach. Heisman didn't say anything, I guess he thought a great deal.

He told me afterwards that he had never felt so sorry for a man on a football field as he had for Suter at that moment.

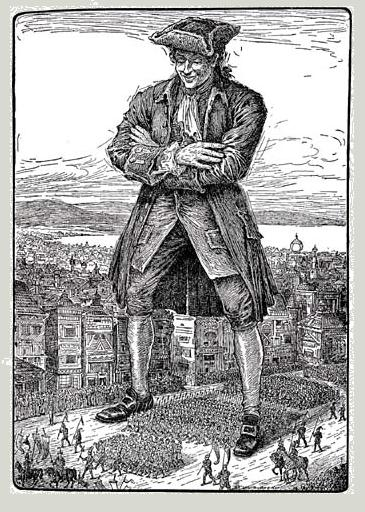
Woodruff wrote Dan McGugin "stood out in the South like Gulliver among the native sons of Lilliput."

A Sewanee legend of just a few years after, Henry D. Phillips, was called by Woodruff "the greatest football player who ever sank cleated shoes into a chalk line south of the Mason–Dixon line."

Of Vanderbilt's winningest coach Dan McGugin, Woodruff wrote "The plain facts of the business are that McGugin stood out in the South like Gulliver among the native sons of Lilliput. There was no foeman worthy of the McGugin steel.”

After the loss of Knute Rockne's Fighting Irish to Georgia Tech in 1928, Rockne wrote of an attack on his coaching in the Atlanta Journal, "I am surprised that a paper of such fine, high standing [as yours] would allow a zipper to write in his particular vein . . . the article by Fuzzy Woodruff was not called for."

The last game he ever covered was the Alabama–Tennessee game of 1929.

== Death ==
Woodruff's tombstone is inscribed "Copy All In". Three rifle volleys were fired over the grave and taps played on an army bugle as his casket was lowered into Crestlawn Cemetery, Atlanta. Woodruff was buried in a bloodstained overseas uniform that he brought back. The blood on the uniform was not his own but that of a foreign youth who died in his arms as "Fuzzy" led his men over the top at the Battle of Soissons. "He was a nice boy and I liked him" declared "Fuzzy" in explaining the attachment to the uniform.

== Bibliography ==
A History of Southern Football, 1890-1928
