= Nash Buckingham =

American author and conservationist (1880–1971)

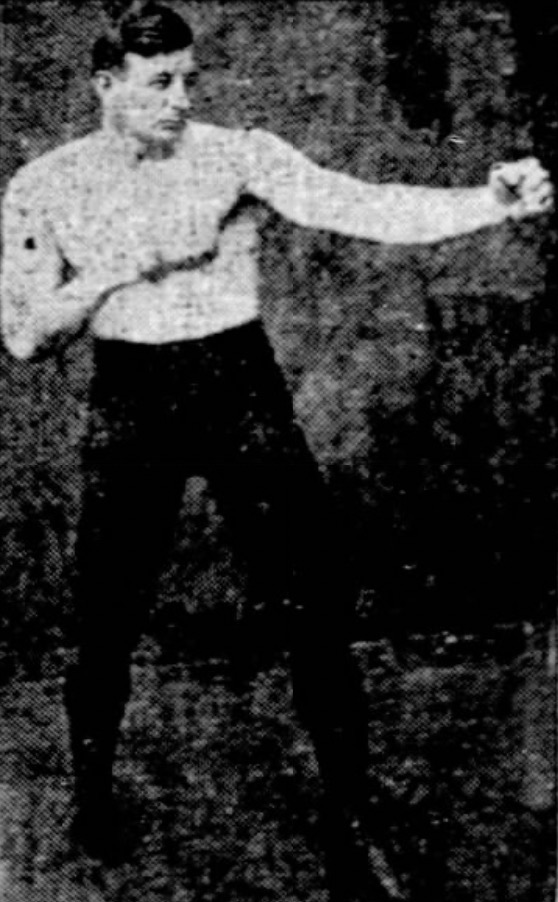
- Born: May 31, 1880
- Died: March 10, 1971 (aged 90)
- Occupations: Author, conservationist
- Known for: De Shootinest Gent'man
- Football career

Profile
- Position: Tackle/Fullback

Career information
- College: Tennessee (1902)

Awards and highlights
- All-Southern (1902)

Theophilus Nash Buckingham (May 31, 1880 – March 10, 1971), commonly referred to as Nash Buckingham, was an American author and conservationist from Tennessee. He wrote a collection of short stories entitled De Shootinest Gent'man.

He played college football for the Tennessee Volunteers, where he was captain and selected an All-Southern tackle in 1902. The Volunteers won a school record six games in 1902 and beat rivals Sewanee and Georgia Tech. For many years after, Buckingham selected the All-Southern team for the Memphis Commercial Appeal. He was nominated though not selected for an Associated Press All-Time Southeast 1869–1919 era team.

Buckingham wrote nine books and hundreds of articles that regularly appeared in such magazines as Outdoor Life, Field & Stream, and Sports Afield and Recreation. His writings were often accompanied by photographs taken by the author himself.
