= John de Saulles =

American football player, coach, and businessman

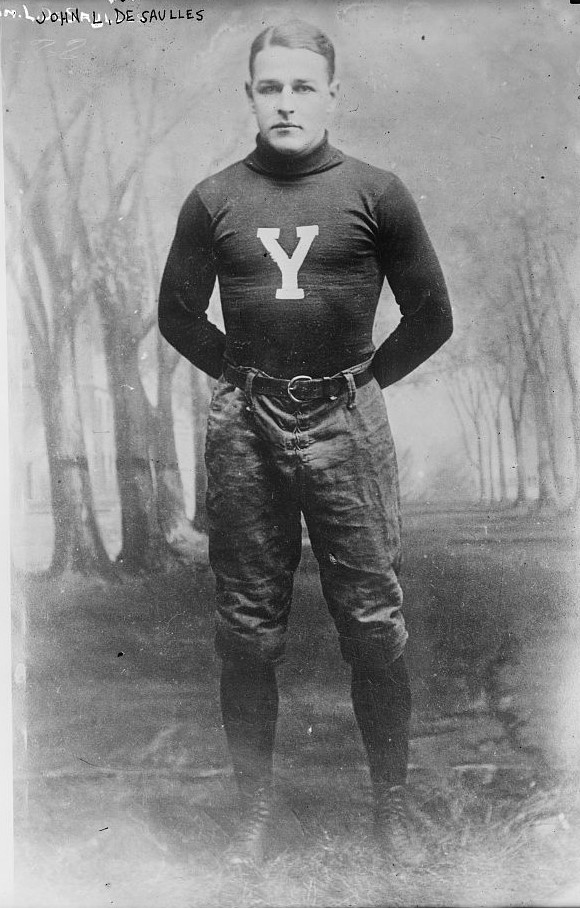
- de Saulles as Yale football player
- Born: May 25, 1878; Bethlehem, Pennsylvania, U.S.
- Died: August 3, 1917 (aged 39); Westbury, New York, U.S.
- Education: Yale University
- Occupations: American football player and coach, real estate broker
- Spouse: Blanca Errázuriz
- Children: John L. de Saulles, Jr.
- Parent(s): Arthur Brice de Saulles; Catherine Heckscher
- Relatives: Charles de Saulles (brother)

John Gerard Longer de Saulles (May 25, 1878 – August 3, 1917) was an American football player and coach, real estate broker, and businessman whose murder by his millionaire wife (accused, but acquitted) led to a widely reported trial.

== Early life ==
John "Jack" Gerard Longer de Saulles was born in Bethlehem, Pennsylvania on May 25, 1878 to Arthur Brice de Saulles and Catherine Margaret Heckscher, a daughter of the wealthy merchant-banker Charles August Heckscher, who emigrated from Hamburg to the United States in 1829. He was raised alongside his brother Charles de Saulles within New York City high society. He became a star quarterback and captain of the Yale University's varsity team of 1901, being named to the 1901 College Football All-America Team by the New York Post. In 1902 he was appointed as head football coach at the University of Virginia, where he compiled an 8–1–1 record in one season.

In 1911, de Saulles travelled to Chile as representative of the South American Concessions Syndicate, a concern made up largely of Americans living in London, which was active in promoting the Trans Andean Railroad, connecting the railway systems of Chile and Argentina. While there, the 32-year-old de Saulles met 16-year-old Chilean heiress Blanca Errázuriz. They were soon engaged and on December 14, 1911 he married her at the English Catholic Church, in Paris, France.

The married couple settled in New York City, where he became a partner of the family-owned real estate firm Heckscher & de Saulles. He participated very actively in the 1912 presidential election, where de Saulles organised 72,000 college men for Wilson. In the campaign de Saulles and President Wilson became close friends, and he was rewarded with an appointment as U.S. Envoy Extraordinary and Minister Plenipotentiary to Uruguay, but after the Senate had confirmed the appointment and even though he took the oath of office, he resigned before traveling to take up the post, explaining that his business interests in the United States made it impossible for him to accept.

== Background ==
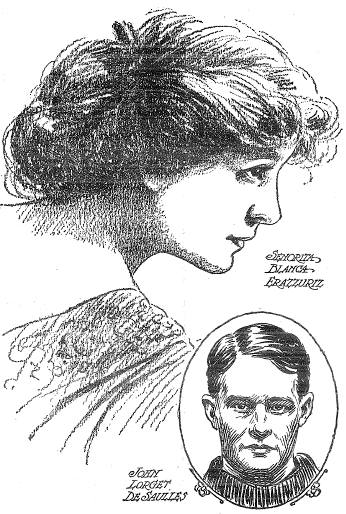
Blanca Errázuriz and John de Saulles (1912)

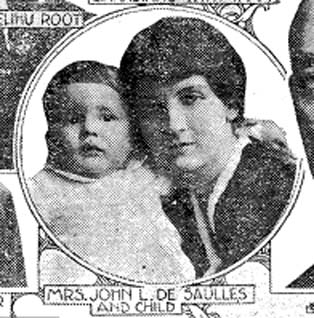
Blanca Errázuriz and her only child, John "Jack" de Saulles Jr. (1917)

=== The divorce ===
In 1915, Blanca Errázuriz befriended Rudolph Valentino in New York City, where he was working as an exhibition dancer and had gained attention for his rendition of the Argentine tango, which was the craze at the time. Valentino enjoyed befriending many people of high society, and Blanca Errázuriz was unhappily married to De Saulles by whom she already had a son. Whether the two, Valentino and Errázuriz, actually had a romantic relationship is unknown, but Valentino was quite smitten with her so when Blanca was seeking a divorce from her husband, Valentino agreed to provide proof in court that Joan Sawyer, his dancing partner, was having an adulterous relationship with De Saulles; and took the stand to support Blanca's claim of John's well known infidelities.

Mr. de Saulles was not pleased with this and once the divorce was granted in December 1916, he used his political connections to have Valentino arrested along with a Mrs. Thyme, who was a known "madam", on vice charges (the exact charges are unknown). The evidence was flimsy at best (Valentino having been near the wrong place at the wrong time) and after a few days in jail, Valentino's bail was lowered from $10,000 to $1,500. The scandal was well publicized along with the trial and Valentino felt degraded. No one would hire him and his old friends would no longer talk to him. Blanca seemed to not even thank him for his testimony.

=== The murder ===
Shortly after the divorce, on August 3, 1917, Blanca had herself driven from her home in Roslyn, New York to The Box, in Meadowbrook Colony, near Westbury, New York, the country home of her ex-husband. She had legal claims over the custody of their son, since she and her husband had been given shared-custody over him, but de Saulles refused to acknowledge the court's decision. She arrived at The Box shortly after 8 p.m., and found de Saulles sitting in the porch of the house. They started to argue, and she pointed a gun at his head demanding he immediately hand over the child to her. When he tried to disarm her, she shot him five times. He was rushed to the Nassau County Hospital, but died there at 10:20 p.m. of his injuries. In the meantime, she awaited at the house for the arrival of the police, to whom she surrendered. She was charged with murder in the first degree and imprisoned in the Nassau County Jail at Mineola, New York, leading to a sensational trial.

The widely reported case went on for months, relegating the First World War that was raging in Europe to the inside pages of the newspapers. Blanca was defended by Henry Uterhart, a noted criminalist of the time, and the principal witness for the defence was Suzanne Monteau, Blanca's French maid, who had accompanied her that night and completely supported her version of the facts. Blanca Errázuriz became the darling of the press, and the champion of the suffragettes who portrayed her as the victim of the chauvinism prevalent in the society of the time, while Valentino's name was again dragged through the mud though he had nothing to do with Blanca by this point.

Blanca Errázuriz was unanimously acquitted of the murder charges on December 1, 1917 in what was called a "popular" verdict. Valentino changed his name from Rodolfo Guglielmi to various variations of Rudolph Valentino, partly to avoid association with the scandal and partly because Americans had trouble pronouncing Guglielmi. After the trial, he moved to Hollywood, where he started his successful movie career. Years later he tried to contact her again, but she would neither respond his calls or agree to see him. Blanca Errázuriz, who later married and divorced from a Chilean businessman, lived until 1940, when she committed suicide.

== Legacy ==
The case was the basis for the 1918 silent movie The Woman and the Law, directed by Raoul Walsh; with Jack Connors, Miriam Cooper and Peggy Hopkins Joyce. The name De Saulles was changed to La Salle but the film's opening credits admit to being based on the story. Producer William Fox wanted Miriam Cooper to play in the film, as she so closely resembled the woman she was to portray. According to Cooper, people on the street would mistake her for Blanca De Saulles. Cooper fell ill when the film was to go into production, bowed out, and was replaced by another actress, who proved to be so terrible that Fox laid down the law with Cooper, telling her to make the film no matter how sick or how well she felt. It also helped that Raoul Walsh was her husband.

== Head coaching record ==
Year	Team	Overall	Conference	Standing	Bowl/playoffs
Virginia Orange and Blue (Independent) (1902)
1902	Virginia	8–1–1			
Virginia:		8–1–1			
Total:		8–1–1			
