= 1902 Southern Intercollegiate Athletic Association football season =

- League: NCAA
- Sport: College football
- Duration: September 27, 1902 through November 29, 1902
- Teams: 18

Regular Season
- Season champions: Clemson

Football seasons
- ← 1901 1903 →

1902 Southern Intercollegiate Athletic Association football standings
	Conf.					Overall
Team	W		L		T	W		L		T
Clemson $	5	–	0	–	0	6	–	1	–	0
Vanderbilt	6	–	1	–	0	8	–	1	–	0
LSU +	5	–	1	–	0	6	–	1	–	0
Texas	4	–	1	–	0	6	–	3	–	1
Sewanee	4	–	2	–	0	6	–	2	–	0
Tennessee	4	–	2	–	0	6	–	2	–	0
Georgia	3	–	2	–	1	4	–	2	–	1
Ole Miss	3	–	3	–	0	4	–	3	–	0
Nashville	2	–	2	–	0	2	–	4	–	0
Auburn	2	–	4	–	1	2	–	4	–	1
Alabama	2	–	4	–	0	4	–	4	–	0
Cumberland (TN)	1	–	4	–	0	3	–	5	–	0
Tulane	0	–	3	–	2	1	–	4	–	2
Furman	0	–	2	–	1	4	–	3	–	4
Georgia Tech	0	–	4	–	2	0	–	6	–	2
Mississippi A&M	0	–	4	–	1	1	–	4	–	1
Kentucky State	0	–	2	–	0	4	–	6	–	1
$ – Conference champion; + LSU claims a co-championship

The 1902 Southern Intercollegiate Athletic Association football season was the college football games played by the member schools of the Southern Intercollegiate Athletic Association as part of the 1902 college football season. The season began on September 27.

Clemson claimed an SIAA title.

== Season overview ==
=== Results and team statistics ===
Conf. Rank	Team	Head coach	Conf. record	Winning Pct.	Overall record	PPG	PAG
1	Clemson	John Heisman	5–0–0	1.000	6–1–0	21.7	3.1
2	Vanderbilt	Billy Watkins	6–1–0	.857	8–1–0	23.8	6.7
3	LSU	W. S. Borland	5–1–0	.833	6–1–0	11.7	3.6
4	Texas	J. B. Hart	4–1–0	.800	6–3–1	8.2	3.4
5 (tie)	Sewanee	L. W. Boynton	4–2–0	.667	7–2–0	13.0	3.1
5 (tie)	Tennessee	H. F. Fisher	4–2–0	.667	6–2–0	11.0	4.9
7	Georgia	Billy Reynolds	3–2–1	.583	4–2–1	6.9	7.4
8 (tie)	Mississippi	D. S. Martin	3–3–0	.500	4–3–3	17.3	6.6
8 (tie)	Nashville	Neil Snow	2–2–0	.500	2–4–0		
10	Auburn	Robert Kent / M. S. Harvey	2–4–1	.357	2–4–1	6.6	6.4
11	Alabama	Eli Abbott	2–4–0	.333	4–4–0	6.6	6.1
12	Cumberland	A. L. Phillips	1–4–0	.250	3–5–0	18.0	17.0
13 (tie)	Tulane	Virginius Dabney	0–4–2	.167	1–4–2	6.7	9.6
13 (tie)	Furman	Charles Roller	0–2–1	.167	4–3–4	3.5	5.1
15	Georgia Tech	George Andree	0–5–2	.143	0–6–2	2.9	15.3
16	Mississippi A&M	Jerry Gwin	0–4–1	.100	1–4–1	7.2	13.3
17	Kentucky State	E. N. McLeod	0–2–0	.000	4–6–1		

Key

PPG = Average of points scored per game
PAG = Average of points allowed per game

=== Regular season ===
Index to colors and formatting
Non-conference matchup; SIAA member won
Non-conference matchup; SIAA member lost
Non-conference matchup; tie
Conference matchup

SIAA teams in bold.

==== Week One ====
Date	Visiting team	Home team	Site	Result	Attendance	Reference
September 20	Mooney	**Cumberland**		**L** 0–15		

==== Week Two ====
Date	Visiting team	Home team	Site	Result	Attendance	Reference
September 27	**Vanderbilt**	**Cumberland**	Lebanon, TN	**VAN** 45–0		
September 27	Mooney	**Sewanee**	Hardee Field • Sewanee, TN	**W** 39–0		
September 27	Q & C Railroad	**Kentucky State**	Lexington, KY	**W** 22–0		

==== Week Three ====
Date	Visiting team	Home team	Site	Result	Attendance	Reference
October 3	**Furman**	Bingham Military School	Riverside Park • Asheville, NC	**W** 12–0		
October 4	North Carolina A&M	**Clemson**	Bowman Field • Calhoun, SC	**W** 11–5		
October 4	Oklahoma	**Texas**	Varsity Athletic Field • Austin, TX	**W** 22–6		
October 4	Miami (OH)	**Kentucky State**	Lexington, KY	**W** 11–5		
October 6	North Carolina A&M	**Furman**	Greenville, SC	**T** 0–0		
October 8	**Nashville**	**Cumberland**	Peabody Field • Nashville, TN	**NASH** 11–0		

==== Week Four ====
Date	Visiting team	Home team	Site	Result	Attendance	Reference
October 10	Birmingham High School	**Alabama**	The Quad • Tuscaloosa, AL	**W** 57–0		
October 10	**Furman**	Davidson	Davidson, NC	**W** 6–0		
October 10	**Sewanee**	**Texas**	Fairgrounds • Dallas, TX	**TEX** 11–0		
October 11	**Auburn**	**Georgia Tech**	Piedmont Park • Atlanta, GA	**AUB** 18–6		
October 11	Kentucky University	**Nashville**	Athletic Park • Nashville, TN	**L** 0–17		
October 11	King (TN)	**Tennessee**	Baldwin Park • Knoxville, TN	**W** 12–0		
October 11	**Ole Miss**	**Vanderbilt**	Dudley Field • Nashville, TN	**VAN** 29–0		
October 11	**Furman**	**North Carolina**	Campus Athletic Field • Chapel Hill, NC	**UNC** 10–0		
October 13	Marion	**Alabama**	The Quad • Tuscaloosa, AL	**W** 81–0		
October 13	**Furman**	North Carolina A&M	Fairgrounds • Raleigh, NC	**W** 5–2		

==== Week Five ====
Date	Visiting team	Home team	Site	Result	Attendance	Reference
October 16	**LSU**	Southwestern Louisiana	Lafayette, LA	**W** 42–0		
October 17	**Cumberland**	**Mississippi A&M**	Starkville Fairgrounds • Starkville, MS	**CUM** 15–6		
October 18	**Cumberland**	**Ole Miss**	Oxford, MS	**MISS** 38–0		
October 18	**Auburn**	**Alabama**	West End Park • Birmingham, AL	**AUB** 23–0		
October 18	**Clemson**	**Georgia Tech**	Brisbane Park • Atlanta, GA	**CLEM** 44–5		
October 18	**Furman**	**Georgia**	Herty Field • Athens, GA	**UGA** 11–0		
October 18	**LSU**	**Texas**	Fairgrounds • San Antonio, TX	**LSU** 5–0		
October 18	Georgetown (KY)	**Kentucky State**	Lexington, KY	**W** 28–0		
October 18	Tulane Alumni	**Tulane**	Athletic Park • New Orleans, LA	**W** 26–0		
October 18	**Vanderbilt**	Central University	Danville, KY	**W** 24–17		
October 18	Virginia	**Nashville**	Athletic Park • Nashville, TN	**L** 0–27		

==== Week Six ====
Date	Visiting team	Home team	Site	Result	Attendance	Reference
October 21	Maryville (TN)	**Tennessee**	Baldwin Park • Knoxville, TN	**W** 34–0		
October 24	**Clemson**	**Furman**	Greenville, SC	**CLEM** 28–0		
October 25	**Kentucky State**	**Nashville**	Athletic Park • Nashville, TN	**NASH** 11–0		
October 25	**Georgia**	**Georgia Tech**	Brisbane Park • Atlanta, GA	**T** 0–0		
October 25	**Ole Miss**	**Mississippi A&M**	Starkville Fairgrounds • Starkville, MS	**MISS** 21–0		
October 25	**Sewanee**	Washington University	League Park • St. Louis, MO	**W** 22–6		
October 25	**Texas**	Texas A&M	Fairgrounds • San Antonio, TX	**T** 0–0		
October 25	**Auburn**	**Tulane**	Athletic Park • New Orleans, LA	**T** 0–0	1,500	
October 25	**Vanderbilt**	**Tennessee**	Baldwin Park • Knoxville, TN	**VAN** 12–5		
October 27	**Auburn**	**LSU**	State Field • Baton Rouge, LA	**LSU** 5–0	2,000	
October 27	**Kentucky State**	Mooney	Murfreesboro, TN	**L** 0–23		

==== Week Seven ====
Date	Visiting team	Home team	Site	Result	Attendance	Reference
October 30	**Clemson**	South Carolina	Columbia, SC	**L** 12–6		
November 1	**Georgia**	**Alabama**	West End Park • Birmingham, AL	**UGA** 5–0		
November 1	**Georgia Tech**	**Furman**	Greenville, SC	**T** 0–0		
November 1	Memphis University School	**Ole Miss**	Oxford, MS	**W** 42–0		
November 1	**Mississippi A&M**	**Tulane**	Athletic Park • New Orleans, LA	**T** 11–11		
November 1	**Sewanee**	**Tennessee**	Baldwin Park • Knoxville, TN	**TENN** 6–0		
November 1	Trinity (TX)	**Texas**	Varsity Athletic Field • Austin, TX	**W** 27–0		
November 1	Washington University	**Vanderbilt**	Dudley Field • Nashville, TN	**W** 33–12		
November 1	**Kentucky State**	Central University (KY)	Danville, KY	**L** 0–15		

==== Week Eight ====
Date	Visiting team	Home team	Site	Result	Attendance	Reference
November 6	**Sewanee**	**Auburn**	West End Park • Birmingham, AL	**SEW** 6–0		
November 7	**Tennessee**	**Nashville**	Peabody Field • Nashville, TN	**TENN** 10–0		
November 8	**Mississippi A&M**	**Alabama**	The Quad • Tuscaloosa, AL	**ALA** 27–0		
November 8	**Georgia**	**Clemson**	Bowman Field • Calhoun, SC	**CLEM** 36–0		
November 8	**Ole Miss**	**LSU**	Athletic Park • New Orleans, LA	**LSU** 6–0		
November 8	Bethel (KY)	**Cumberland**	Lebanon, TN	**W** 48–0		
November 8	St. Albans	**Georgia Tech**	Brisbane Park • Atlanta, GA	**W** 17–0		
November 8	**Tulane**	Texas A&M	Fairgrounds • Bryan, TX	**L** 17–5		
November 8	**Kentucky State**	Louisville YMCA	Eclipse Park • Louisville, KY	**L** 0–17		
November 8	Kentucky University	**Vanderbilt**	Dudley Field • Nashville, TN	**W** 16–5		
November 8	Haskell	**Texas**	Varsity Athletic Field • Austin, TX	**L** 0–12		
November 10	St. Albans	**Furman**	Greenville, SC	**T** 0–0		

==== Week Nine ====
Date	Visiting team	Home team	Site	Result	Attendance	Reference
November 13	Davidson	**Georgia Tech**	Brisbane Park • Atlanta, GA	**L** 7–6		
November 14	South Carolina	**Furman**	Greenville, SC	**W** 10–0		
November 14	Davidson	**Georgia**	Herty Field • Athens, GA	**W** 27–0		
November 15	Cincinnati	**Kentucky State**	Lexington, KY	**T** 6–6		
November 15	South Kentucky	**Cumberland**	Lexington, KY	**W** 80–0		
November 15	**Clemson**	**Auburn**	Drill Field • Auburn, AL	**CLEM** 16–0		
November 15	**Mississippi A&M**	Howard (AL)	West End Park • Birmingham, AL	**W** 26–0		
November 15	**Ole Miss**	**Tennessee**	Red Elm Park • Memphis, TN	**TENN** 11–10		
November 15	**Texas**	**Nashville**	Peabody Field • Nashville, TN	**TEX** 11–5		
November 15	**Vanderbilt**	**Tulane**	Athletic Park • New Orleans, LA	**VAN** 23–5	8,000	
November 17	**Vanderbilt**	**LSU**	State Field • Baton Rouge, LA	**VAN** 27–5	1,000	
November 18	**Sewanee**	**Georgia**	Brisbane Park • Atlanta, GA	**SEW** 11–0		

==== Week Ten ====
Date	Visiting team	Home team	Site	Result	Attendance	Reference
November 19	**Texas**	**Alabama**	The Quad • Tuscaloosa, AL	**TEX** 10–0		
November 21	**Cumberland**	**Sewanee**	Hardee Field • Sewanee, TN	**SEW** 22–0		
November 22	**Tennessee**	**Georgia Tech**	Brisbane Park • Atlanta, GA	**TENN** 10–6		
November 24	**Texas**	**Tulane**	Athletic Park • New Orleans, LA	**TEX** 6–0		

==== Week Eleven ====
Date	Visiting team	Home team	Site	Result	Attendance	Reference
November 27	**Georgia Tech**	**Alabama**	West End Park • Birmingham, AL	**ALA** 26–0		
November 27	**Clemson**	**Tennessee**	Baldwin Park • Knoxville, TN	**CLEM** 11–0		
November 27	**Furman**	Charleston AA	Baseball Park • Charleston, SC	**T** 5–5		
November 27	**Auburn**	**Georgia**	Piedmont Park • Atlanta, GA	**UGA** 12–5		
November 27	**LSU**	**Mississippi A&M**	Starkville Fairgrounds • Starkville, MS	**LSU** 6–0		
November 27	**Ole Miss**	**Tulane**	Athletic Park • New Orleans, LA	**MISS** 10–0		
November 27	**Sewanee**	**Vanderbilt**	Dudley Field • Nashville, TN	**SEW** 11–5		
November 27	Texas A&M	**Texas**	Varsity Athletic Field • Austin, TX	**L** 11–0		
November 27	Kentucky University	**Kentucky State**	Lexington, KY	**L** 5–6		
November 29	**LSU**	**Alabama**	The Quad • Tuscaloosa, AL	**LSU** 11–0		

== All-Southern team ==
Walker Reynolds Tichenor's All-Southern team:

Position	Name	Team
QB	John Maxwell	Clemson
HB	Marvin Dickinson	Georgia
FB	Jock Hanvey	Clemson
E	Carl Sitton	Clemson
E	Frank Ridley	Georgia
G	Henry D. Phillips	Sewanee
G	James C. Elmer	Auburn
C	Harold Ketron	Georgia
G	Sandy Beaver	Georgia
T	Joseph Lee Kirby-Smith	Sewanee
E	Hope Sadler	Clemson
