= 1902 Vanderbilt Commodores football team =

American college football season

1902 Vanderbilt Commodores football
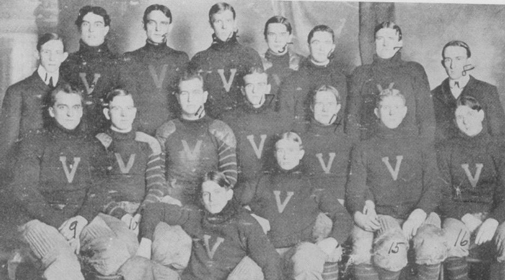
- Conference: Southern Intercollegiate Athletic Association
- Record: 8–1 (5–1 SIAA)
- Head coach: Walter H. Watkins (2nd season)
- Captain: Huldy Davis
- Home stadium: Dudley Field

1902 Southern Intercollegiate Athletic Association football standings
	Conf.					Overall
Team	W		L		T	W		L		T
Clemson $	5	–	0	–	0	6	–	1	–	0
Vanderbilt	6	–	1	–	0	8	–	1	–	0
LSU +	5	–	1	–	0	6	–	1	–	0
Texas	4	–	1	–	0	6	–	3	–	1
Sewanee	4	–	2	–	0	6	–	2	–	0
Tennessee	4	–	2	–	0	6	–	2	–	0
Georgia	3	–	2	–	1	4	–	2	–	1
Ole Miss	3	–	3	–	0	4	–	3	–	0
Nashville	2	–	2	–	0	2	–	4	–	0
Auburn	2	–	4	–	1	2	–	4	–	1
Alabama	2	–	4	–	0	4	–	4	–	0
Cumberland (TN)	1	–	4	–	0	3	–	5	–	0
Tulane	0	–	3	–	2	1	–	4	–	2
Furman	0	–	2	–	1	4	–	3	–	4
Georgia Tech	0	–	4	–	2	0	–	6	–	2
Mississippi A&M	0	–	4	–	1	1	–	4	–	1
Kentucky State	0	–	2	–	0	4	–	6	–	1
$ – Conference champion; + LSU claims a co-championship

The 1902 Vanderbilt Commodores football team represented Vanderbilt University during the 1902 Southern Intercollegiate Athletic Association football season. W. H. Watkins was in his second year coaching Vanderbilt. Vanderbilt was playing in its 13th season of football. The Commodores had wins over Cumberland, Ole Miss, Central of Kentucky, Tennessee, Washington University, Kentucky, Tulane and LSU. The Tulane and LSU contests were played with one day's rest between games for the Commodores.

== Schedule ==
Date	Opponent	Site	Result	Attendance	Source
September 27	at Cumberland (TN)	Lebanon, TN	W 45–0		
October 11	Ole Miss	Dudley Field; Nashville, TN (rivalry)	W 29–0		
October 18	Central University*	Dudley Field; Nashville, TN	W 24–17		
October 25	at Tennessee	Baldwin Park; Knoxville, TN (rivalry)	W 12–5		
November 1	Washington University*	Dudley Field; Nashville, TN	W 33–12		
November 8	Kentucky University*	Dudley Field; Nashville, TN	W 16–5		
November 15	at Tulane	Athletic Park; New Orleans, LA	W 23–5	8,000	
November 17	at LSU	State Field; Baton Rouge LA	W 27–5	1,000	
November 27	Sewanee	Dudley Field; Nashville, TN (rivalry)	L 5–11		
*Non-conference game

== Game summaries ==
=== Cumberland (TN) ===
In the first week of play, Vanderbilt defeated the Cumberland Bulldogs 45–0.

=== Ole Miss ===
Ole Miss vs. Vanderbilt

Team	1	2	Total
Miss.	0	0	0
• Vanderbilt	23	6	29

- Date: October 11
- Location: Memphis, Tennessee

Vanderbilt beat Ole Miss, 29–0. The game was a tale of two halves. Vanderbilt scored four touchdowns in the first half.

The starting lineup was: Howell (left end), Lawler (left tackle), Morgan (left guard), Perry (center), Graham (right guard), Massy (right tackle), Bryan (right end), Kyle (quarterback), Davis (left halfback), Tigert (right halfback), Edgerton (fullback).

=== Central ===
Central at Vanderbilt

Team	1	2	Total
Central	0	17	17
• Vanderbilt	12	12	24

- Date: October 18
- Location: Dudley Field
  Nashville, Tennessee

Central (Note: In 1901, beset with financial difficulties and small enrollment, Central University of Richmond agreed to consolidation with Centre College.) gave Vanderbilt a surprise as the Commodores edged the Kentucky team 24 to 17.

=== Tennessee ===
1902 had one of Tennessee's strongest early elevens. Vanderbilt won 12 to 5 despite a weak line due to its running game. John Edgerton scored both Vanderbilt touchdowns. Tennessee's only score was provided by an A. H. Douglas run around right end, breaking two tackles and getting the touchdown. Nash Buckingham had a 40-yard run through the line. Jones Beene blocked and tackled well.

The starting lineup was: Howell (left end), Lawler (left tackle), Morgan (left guard), Perry (center), Graham (right guard), Massey (right tackle), Bryan (right end), Kyle (quarterback), Davis (left halfback), Tigert (right halfback), Edgerton (fullback).

=== Washington University ===
The Commodores beat the Washington University Bears 33–12. Both teams showed good offense but weak defense. Dan Blake had a 65-yard run.

=== Kentucky State ===
Vanderbilt beat Kentucky State 16–5. Vanderbilt fooled Kentucky multiple times using a fake pass.

The starting lineup was: Howell (left end), Lawler (left tackle), Morgan (left guard), Perry (center), Graham (right guard), Massey (right tackle), Bryan (right end), Kyle (quarterback), Davis (left halfback), Tigert (right halfback), Edgerton (fullback).

=== Tulane ===
Vanderbilt at Tulane

Team	1	2	Total
• Vanderbilt	23	0	23
Tulane	5	0	5

- Date: November 14
- Location: Athletic Park
  New Orleans, Louisiana
- Game attendance: 8,000

Sources:

- The Nashville Banner gave this report of the Commodores departure from Nashville:

"November 14 -- The Vanderbilt football squad left Thursday night for New Orleans. The regular varsity team except for staunch quarterback Frank Kyle boarded the train for the longest, hardest trip of the year. Kyle was left behind with a lame back. Those making the trip are: Perry, Morgan, Graham, Massey, Lawler, Bryan, Howell, Blake, Hamilton, Harris, Love, Tigert, Capt. Davis, Edgerton, Coach Watkins, Manager Buckley, Assistant Manager Creighton, Dr. W. L. Dudley, Doswell Brown, Martin, Wade, Williamson, Barr and Dunbar. The boys will play Tulane Saturday and L.S.U. Monday."

Joe Howell replaced Kyle.

- The Banner gave this report on the Tulane game played on Saturday, November 15:

"About 8,000 spectators witnessed the easy victory of Vanderbilt over Tulane Saturday, the score being 23 to 5. It was the largest crowd of the season. The playing of the Vanderbilt team in the first half was fast and furious, and a score of 23 was made. Tulane was saved from a goose egg by the drop kick of Westerfield from the 35-yard line.

"In the second half the game was close. Blake took the place of Davis, and Wade that of Perry. The aim of the Vanderbilt boys seemed only to hold the score. The weather was very hot, and made it especially hard on the visitors. Vanderbilt outclassed Tulane in weight and skill, and did not have much trouble in making their gains. The star players for Vanderbilt were Howell, Davis, Bryan and Hamilton.

"The feature of the game was Howell's 95-yard run. He advanced the ball from the kick off, and almost every Tulane man made a tackle at him. Davis, as usual, made his gains and two long runs. Bryan was in the game from the start, and did good work. Hamilton made two touchdowns. He bundled the Tulane line for one of them, which was a pretty piece of work. Though Westerfield is a good sprinter, Tigert's punts equaled his every time.

"Tulane has a gritty team, and though they played against odds, they improved as the game went on, and did their best to the end. The score does not show the relative merits of the two teams, because Kyle and Edgerton being out weakened the Vanderbilt team. Tulane was amazed at the quickness of Vanderbilt and while the Vanderbilt boys regret the score, it was not one to grieve over. Tulane only tried the drop kick as a last resort when they despaired of reaching the goal otherwise."

=== LSU ===
Vanderbilt at LSU

Team	1	2	Total
• Vanderbilt	11	16	27
LSU	0	5	5

- Date: November 17
- Location: State Field
  Baton Rouge, Louisiana
- Game attendance: 1,000

Sources:

- The Banner gave this report on the Monday, November 17 game in Baton Rouge against LSU:

"Vanderbilt defeated Louisiana State University, 27 to 5, yesterday. It was an ideal day and about 1,000 people witnessed the game. A place kick only saved Louisiana State University from a whitewash. The game was lacking in interest, for Vanderbilt displayed her superiority so strongly that Louisiana was outclassed.

"Louisiana State University kicked off and Vanderbilt advanced the ball steadily for a touch-down. This was repeated, Tigert making the two touchdowns. Louisiana State University got the ball only once in the first half and lost on downs. At the end of the half the score stood 11 to 0.

"Vanderbilt kicked off and Louisiana State University lost on downs in the second half. The visitors advanced the ball for a touchdown. Davis failed, in kicking a goal. Louisiana State University seemed to be very weak. Vanderbilt made her gains every time, and only lost the ball on fumbles. Louisiana State University never advanced far before losing on downs, they were entirely outclassed in weight and skill. It is hard to say who were the star players for Vanderbilt. Every man played a good game. The playing of Edgerton, Davis, Tigert, and Lawler deserves special notice. For Louisiana State University the playing of Sales, deserves notice.

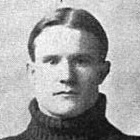
John Edgerton

"The Vanderbilt boys are sore over the treatment they received. The Louisiana State University team couldn't take defeat in a sportsmanlike manner. They claimed that Vanderbilt knew their signals and made uncomplimentary remarks from their sidelines, and altogether the treatment was not as good as the team expected. Vanderbilt played a harder game than at Tulane, and Louisiana State University has a much better team than Tulane. Vanderbilt played a much faster game than Louisiana State University and every trick was a success. Louisiana State University depended entirely on straight football and never succeeded in working any trick.

"The teams were entertained with an elegant dinner after the game by Mr. W. P. Connell, and the University Athletic Association invited the two teams to a theatre party."

- The Banner also gave this report on Vanderbilt winning the Southern Intercollegiate Athletic Association's (S.I.A.A.) championship after defeating LSU:

"Vanderbilt University defeated Louisiana State University here yesterday by the score of 27 to 5; winning the championship of the South intercollegiate athletic association. Vanderbilt made it points on five touchdowns three by Edgerton and two by Tigert. Davis kicked goal twice. The feature of the game was the goal kicked by Landry of Louisiana from the forty-yard line. Time of halves, 25 minutes."

- In the same Banner edition, the resignation of Coach Watkins was announced:

"The rumor that Coach Watkins will discontinue his connection with the Vanderbilt Athletic Association at the close of the present season is creating such interest in football circles. It is reliably stated that Mr. Watkins will resign his position as head coach of the Vanderbilt football and baseball teams in order that he devote attention to the study of law exclusively.

"

"Walter H. Watkins is a graduate of the Princeton class of '99. He was one of the stars on the baseball team, was prominent in track work and was first substitute on the football team for two years. His loss will be a hard blow to Vanderbilt, as his place will be hard to fill. It is understood that Vanderbilt will make an effort to secure the services of Coach Neil Snow, provided he is not retained by the University of Nashville." (Note: Snow resigned from Nashville never to coach again, accepting a construction position in New York.)

=== Sewanee ===
Sewanee at Vanderbilt

Team	1	2	Total
• Sewanee	6	5	11
Vanderbilt	5	0	5

- Date: November 27
- Location: Dudley Field
  Nashville, Tennessee

Overconfident, Vanderbilt was drubbed by rival Sewanee 11–5. Vanderbilt did not score until the second half, when John Edgerton scored the first touchdown on the Tigers since 1897. Sewanee played desperately, and Henry D. Phillips went over for the winning touchdown.

The starting lineup was: Williamson (left end), Lawler (left tackle), Morgan (left guard), Perry (center), Graham (right guard), Massey (right tackle), Bryan (right end), Howell (quarterback), Davis (left halfback), Tigert (right halfback), Edgerton (fullback).

== Players ==
=== Line ===
Player	Position	Games started	Hometown	Prep school	Height	Weight	Age
Claiborne N. Bryan	right end			Webb School	5'10"	168	19
Irish Graham	right guard		Nashville, Tennessee	Bowen School	6'1"	175	19
Frank K. Houston	center			Mooney School	5'11"	175	20
Joe Howell	left end			Wallace University School	5'6"	145	18
John Lawler	left tackle			Webb School	5'11"	165	22
W. S. Love	right end			Mooney School	5'10"	155	20
Lewis E. Martin	left tackle				5'11"	176	21
Felix Massey	right tackle				5'9"	175	26
A. J. Morgan	left guard				5'9"	190	27
Alexander Perry	center			Wallace University School	6'3"	154	23
J. B. Wade	center				6'1"	170	20
James R. Williamson	left end				6'0"	150	21

=== Backfield ===
Player	Position	Games started	Hometown	Prep school	Height	Weight	Age
Dan Blake	halfback		Cuero, Texas	Bowen School	5'10"	155	20
Huldy Davis	left halfback			Webb School	5'8"	145	23
John Edgerton	fullback				5'8"	175	23
Ed Hamilton	fullback		Franklin, Tennessee	Mooney School	5'11"	163	20
Frank Kyle	quarterback			Mooney School	5'11"	160	20
John J. Tigert	right halfback		Nashville, Tennessee	Webb School	6'3"	173	20

== Bibliography ==
- Vanderbilt University (1903). Vanderbilt University Quarterly. Vol. 3.
