= 1902 Texas Longhorns football team =

American college football season

1902 Texas Longhorns football
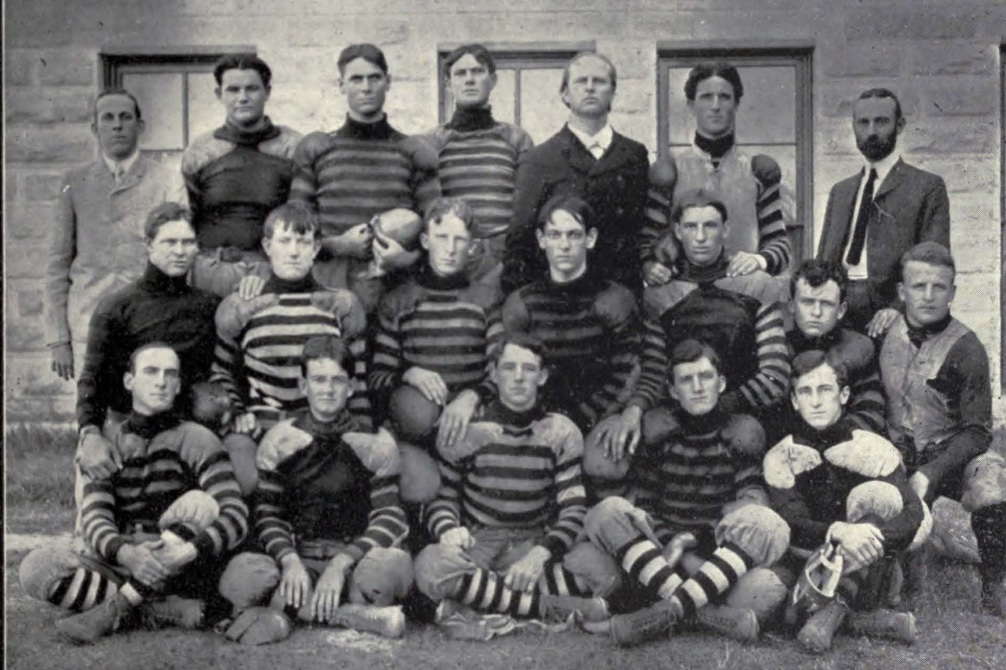
- Conference: Southern Intercollegiate Athletic Association
- Record: 6–3–1 (4–1 SIAA)
- Head coach: J. B. Hart (1st season)
- Captain: I. V. Duncan
- Home stadium: Varsity Athletic Field

1902 Southern Intercollegiate Athletic Association football standings
	Conf.					Overall
Team	W		L		T	W		L		T
Clemson $	5	–	0	–	0	6	–	1	–	0
Vanderbilt	6	–	1	–	0	8	–	1	–	0
LSU +	5	–	1	–	0	6	–	1	–	0
Texas	4	–	1	–	0	6	–	3	–	1
Sewanee	4	–	2	–	0	6	–	2	–	0
Tennessee	4	–	2	–	0	6	–	2	–	0
Georgia	3	–	2	–	1	4	–	2	–	1
Ole Miss	3	–	3	–	0	4	–	3	–	0
Nashville	2	–	2	–	0	2	–	4	–	0
Auburn	2	–	4	–	1	2	–	4	–	1
Alabama	2	–	4	–	0	4	–	4	–	0
Cumberland (TN)	1	–	4	–	0	3	–	5	–	0
Tulane	0	–	3	–	2	1	–	4	–	2
Furman	0	–	2	–	1	4	–	3	–	4
Georgia Tech	0	–	4	–	2	0	–	6	–	2
Mississippi A&M	0	–	4	–	1	1	–	4	–	1
Kentucky State	0	–	2	–	0	4	–	6	–	1
$ – Conference champion; + LSU claims a co-championship

The 1902 Texas 'Varsity football team represented The University of Texas (now known as the University of Texas at Austin Longhorns) in the 1902 Southern Intercollegiate Athletic Association football season. In the first year under head coach J. B. Hart, the Longhorns compiled an overall record of 6-3-1 (4-1 in SIAA play) and outscored their opponents 87-40. The season notably included road wins over Nashville, Alabama, and Tulane all within one week.

== Schedule ==
Date	Time	Opponent	Site	Result	Source
October 2		Oklahoma*	Varsity Athletic Field; Austin, TX (rivalry)	W 22–6	
October 10		vs. Sewanee	Fairgrounds; Dallas, TX	W 11–0	
October 18		vs. LSU	Fairgrounds; San Antonio, TX	L 0–4	
October 25	11:45 a.m.	vs. Texas A&M*	Fairgrounds; San Antonio, TX (rivalry)	T 0–0	
November 1		Trinity (TX)*	Varsity Athletic Field; Austin, TX	W 27–0	
November 8		Haskell*	Varsity Athletic Field; Austin, TX	L 0–12	
November 15		at Nashville	Peabody Field; Nashville, TN	W 11–5	
November 18		at Alabama	The Quad; Tuscaloosa, AL	W 10–0	
November 22		at Tulane	Athletic Park; New Orleans, LA	W 6–0	
November 27		Texas A&M*	Varsity Athletic Field; Austin, TX	L 0–11	
*Non-conference game

== Personnel ==
=== Line ===
Player	Position	Games played	Home town	Height	Weight	Age	Letter #
I.V. Duncan	Left End	10	Wharton, Texas	5'9"	158 lbs	21	3rd
C. Huggins	Left Tackle	7	Sherman, Texas	6'3"	180 lbs	24	1st
N.J. Marshall	Left Guard	10	Bonham, Texas	6'2"	183 lbs	22	2nd
Dan J. Harrison	Center	7	Bartlett, Texas	5'8"	165 lbs	23	1st
John F. Easter	Right Guard	7	Itasca, Texas	5'9"	172 lbs	25	1st
D.M. Prendergrast	Right Tackle	10	Waco, Texas	5'10"	183 lbs	20	2nd
Samuel G. Newton	Right End	8	San Antonio, Texas	5'8"	143 lbs	19	1st

=== Backfield ===
Player	Position	Games played	Home town	Height	Weight	Age	Letter #
Randon Porter	Quarterback	10	Houston, Texas	5'8"	136 lbs	21	2nd
George V. Maverick	Left Halfback	5	San Antonio, Texas	5'7"	128 lbs	22	1st
Rembert Watson	Right Halfback	9	Waxahachie, Texas	5'10"	158 lbs	21	2nd
John A. Jackson	Fullback	10	Austin, Texas	6'0"	163 lbs	20	1st

=== Subs ===
Not awarded letter status.

Player	Position	Games played	Home town	Height	Weight	Age
S.M. Adams	Right Guard	7	Garrison, Texas	5'11"	188 lbs	24
A.M. Frazier	Left Tackle	3	Brandon, Texas	6'0"	160 lbs	24
A.T. Moore	Fullback	2	Waco, Texas	5'9"	138 lbs	18
L.H. Hubbard	Right Halfback	8	El Paso, Texas	5'11"	149 lbs	21
Ed Crane	Left Halfback	6	Dallas, Texas	5'10"	155 lbs	19
T.D. Campbell	Left Guard	3	Winnsboro, Texas	5'10"	174 lbs	23
B.L. Glascock	Center	4	Elgin, Texas	5'11"	178 lbs	19
J.R. Swenson	Right Guard	3	Port Lavaca, Texas	6'1"	200 lbs	
