= 1902 Georgia Tech football team =

American college football season

1902 Georgia Tech football
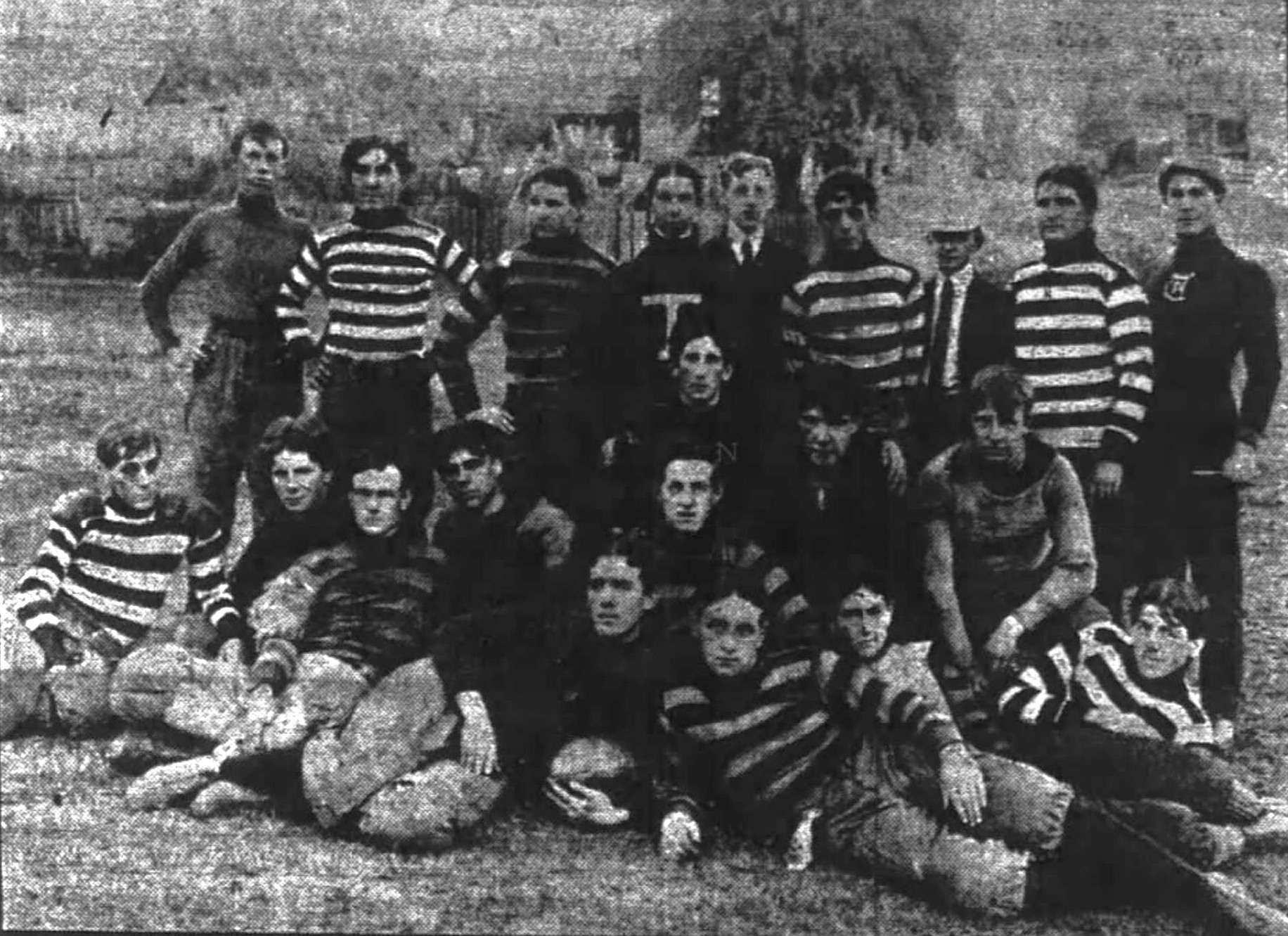
- Conference: Southern Intercollegiate Athletic Association
- Record: 0–6–2 (0–4–2 SIAA)
- Head coach: George Andree (1st season)
- Captains: Bully Young (3 games); Paul Brinson (1 game)
- Home stadium: Brisbine Park

Uniform
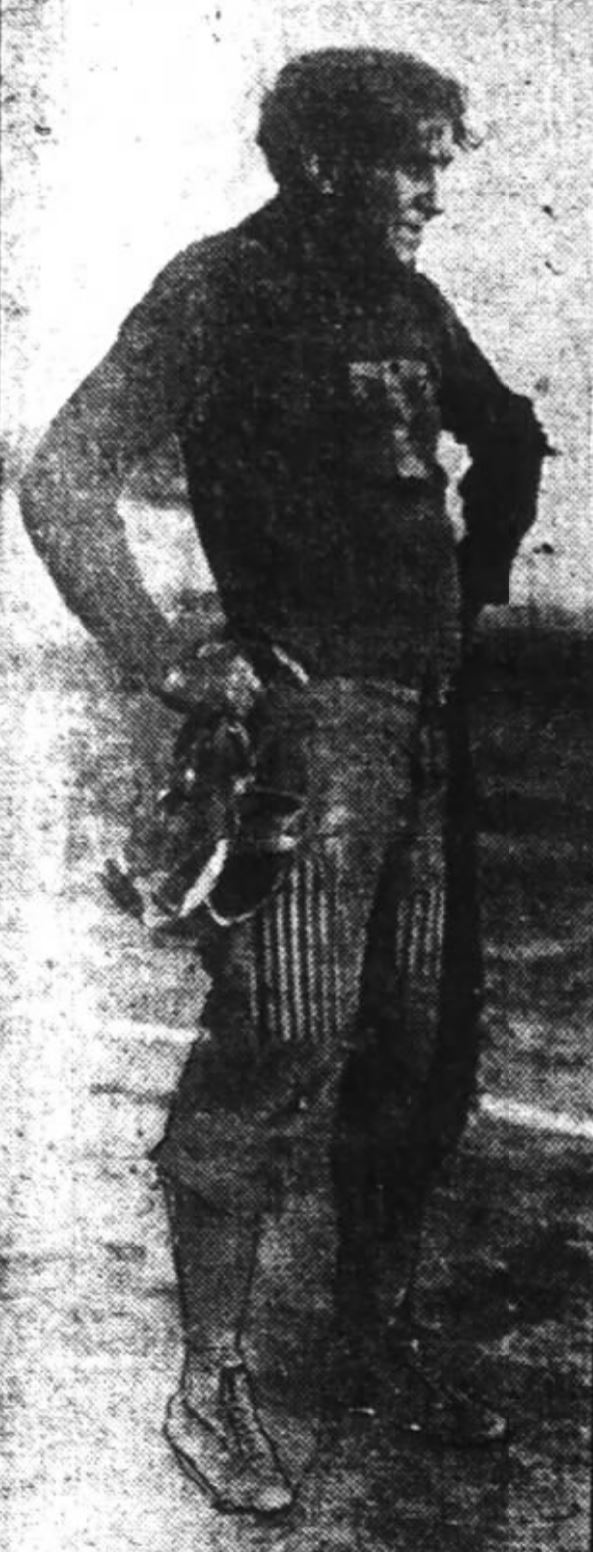

1902 Southern Intercollegiate Athletic Association football standings
	Conf.					Overall
Team	W		L		T	W		L		T
Clemson $	5	–	0	–	0	6	–	1	–	0
Vanderbilt	6	–	1	–	0	8	–	1	–	0
LSU +	5	–	1	–	0	6	–	1	–	0
Texas	4	–	1	–	0	6	–	3	–	1
Sewanee	4	–	2	–	0	6	–	2	–	0
Tennessee	4	–	2	–	0	6	–	2	–	0
Georgia	3	–	2	–	1	4	–	2	–	1
Ole Miss	3	–	3	–	0	4	–	3	–	0
Nashville	2	–	2	–	0	2	–	4	–	0
Auburn	2	–	4	–	1	2	–	4	–	1
Alabama	2	–	4	–	0	4	–	4	–	0
Cumberland (TN)	1	–	4	–	0	3	–	5	–	0
Tulane	0	–	3	–	2	1	–	4	–	2
Furman	0	–	2	–	1	4	–	3	–	4
Georgia Tech	0	–	4	–	2	0	–	6	–	2
Mississippi A&M	0	–	4	–	1	1	–	4	–	1
Kentucky State	0	–	2	–	0	4	–	6	–	1
$ – Conference champion; + LSU claims a co-championship

The 1902 Georgia Tech football team represented the Georgia School of Technology during the 1902 college football season. Jesse Thrash was the school's first All-Southern player. Home games were played at Brisbine Park in south Atlanta. The team was nicknamed the Blacksmiths though the team was also referred to as the "Textile Boys" and the Boilermakers.

Georgia Tech went undefeated in 1901 ending a streak of three straight winless seasons. In the off-season, it was reinstated into the Southern Intercollegiate Athletic Association following a year of suspension on claims of using professional players on its 1901 baseball team.

Tech contracted George Andree, a star on the Gallaudet football team, to coach the team. William Rankin was named as team manager and Bully Young, from the 1901 team, as captain. The Georgia Tech Athletic Association hoped for a strong season to raise enough money to put itself on a sound basis after a financially disappointing baseball season.

Coach Andree arrived in Atlanta on September 19, a few days before the school officially opened, and the team had its first meeting the next day. Andree was deaf and played on the all-deaf football and baseball teams at Gallaudet. From this experience, he taught the Georgia Tech players using hand signals and concentrating on speed. He began selecting the players for the varsity team on September 22 and practice was held each afternoon during the week.

== Schedule ==
Date	Time	Opponent	Site	Result	Attendance	Source
October 11	5:00 p.m.	Auburn	Brisbine Park; Atlanta, GA (rivalry)	L 6–18	700	
October 18	3:30 p.m.	Clemson	Brisbine Park; Atlanta, GA (rivalry)	L 5–44		
October 25	3:30 p.m.	Georgia	Brisbine Park; Atlanta, GA (rivalry)	T 0–0	1,500	
November 1	3:50	at Furman	University Grounds; Greenville, SC	T 0–0		
November 8		Saint Albans*	Brisbine Park; Atlanta, GA	L 0–17		
November 13		Davidson*	Brisbine Park; Atlanta, GA	L 6–7		
November 22		Tennessee	Brisbine Park; Atlanta, GA (rivalry)	L 6–10		
November 27		at Alabama	West End Park; Birmingham, AL (rivalry)	L 0–26		
*Non-conference game

Games against Gordon, Sewanee, and Texas were also considered but did not ultimately materialize.

== Game summaries ==
Auburn Tigers (0–0–0) at Georgia Tech Blacksmiths (0–0–0)

Quarter	1	2	Total
Auburn	6	12	18
Georgia Tech	6	0	6

at Brisbine Park • Atlanta, Georgia

- Date: Saturday, October 11, 1902
- Game time: 5:00 p.m.
- Game attendance: 700
- Referee: Reynolds Tichenor
- Headline: Auburn Tigers Defeat Plucky Tech Eleven in Opening Contest of the Season

Georgia Tech opened the season against Auburn, a team it had lost all five of its previous meetings, including a 63–0 loss the last time they played in 1899. The game was played in Brisbine Park where Tech had not played since 1897. Both halves were played at twenty-five minutes. Georgia's head coach, Billy Reynolds, attended the game.

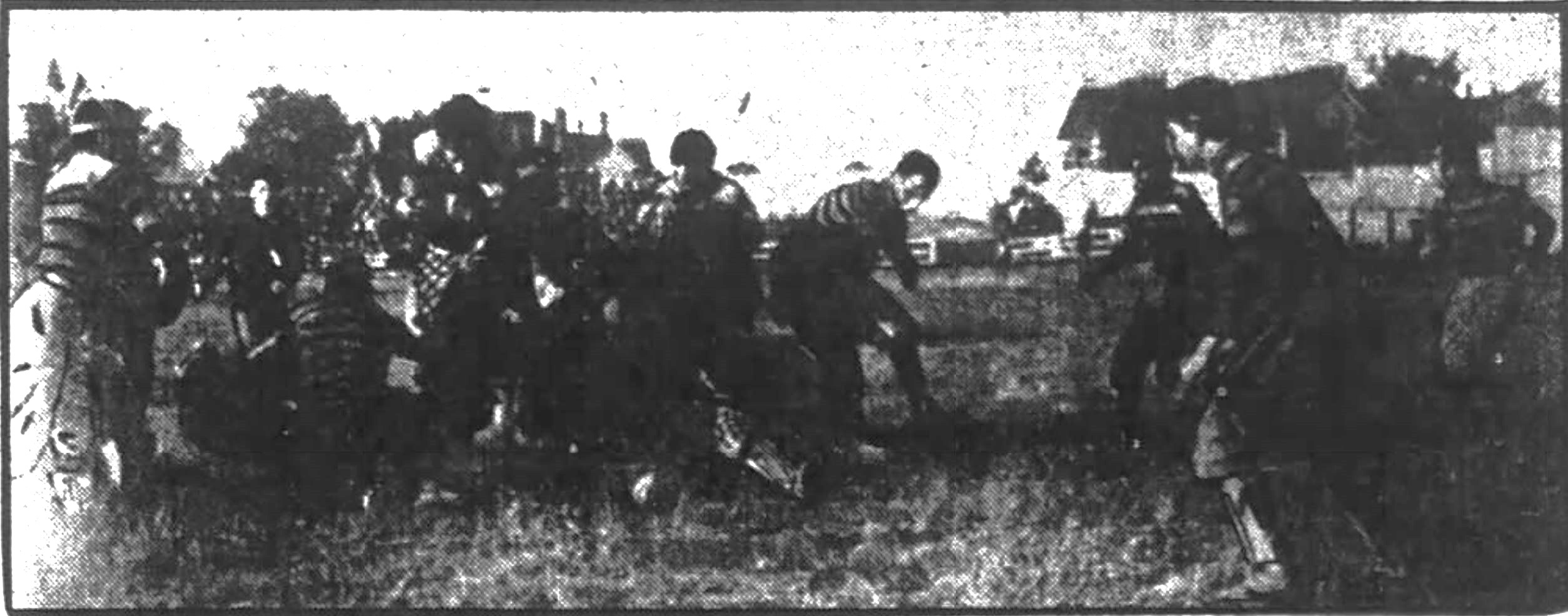
Auburn's Allison (center left) dives over the Tech line

The Blacksmiths received the ball first and made good progress into Auburn half but lost the ball on downs. Auburn fumbled a couple plays later, and the teams traded the ball for a couple of possessions. Tech received the ball and made it back into Auburn territory but lost the ball on downs. Auburn immediately fumbled and Georgia Tech's Cannon then made a 55-yard touchdown run through the center of Auburn's line. This sparked life into Auburn's offense who drove through the Georgia Tech line and scored a touchdown a couple of minutes later. The half ended with a tie score of 6 to 6.

Auburn outclassed Georgia Tech in the second half and Tech's line was slowly broken down. Its captain, Bully Young, was forced to retire from the game. Georgia Tech fumbled the ball several times in the second half. Auburn scored a touchdown from 12 yards out through the center by Ward. A couple of possessions later, Auburn's Allison made another touchdown run from the center. Georgia Tech was unable to make much progress the rest of the game, but its defense was able to keep Auburn from scoring with the ball on its own two-yard line in the last minute of the game. As time was called, Auburn won 18 to 6.

Young and Cannon played will for Georgia Tech and Coach Andree said that he was in no way disappointed with the result. Captain Young said that although he wanted a victory, "I am abundantly satisfied with the work of our team. Auburn has had more practice than we have had, and practice tells." Georgia's Coach Reynolds remarked that the team was a lot slower and weaker than he had expected and that more practice was expected.

Clemson Tigers (1–0–0) at Georgia Tech Blacksmiths (0–1–0)

Quarter	1	2	Total
Clemson	27	17	44
Georgia Tech	5	0	5

at Brisbine Park • Atlanta, Georgia

- Date: Saturday, October 18, 1902
- Game time: 3:30 p.m.
- Game attendance: Unknown
- Referee: Reynolds Tichenor
- Headline: Clemson Ate Up the Techs

Clemson had beaten Georgia Tech easily in both their first two meetings, though this was the first to take place in Atlanta. Clemson came into the game with a win in its only game, an 11–5 victory against North Carolina A&M. Georgia Tech's captain and fullback, Bully Young, had an ankle injury and missed the game, so Paul Brinson took over the captaincy, and Reddy McDaniel, a back-up from the 1901 team, joined the team. The first half of the game was played at twenty minutes and the second half at fifteen.

Clemson received the kick and its left end, Sitton, scored on a 60-yard run thirty seconds into the game. After the kickoff, Clemson made back-to-back 20 and 15 yard-plays around the left end. A few plays later, Sadler went around on the right for another touchdown. Clemson's next drive made it all the way to Tech's 20-yard line before fumbling. With the ball, the Blacksmiths went on the attack and made several good plays including a 40-yard run on Clemson's right end by McDaniel. A few plays later, McDaniel was able to run across the left side of the line for a touchdown. Georgia Tech had to punt it over on its next possession and Clemson scored two plays later. Clemson scored two more touchdowns before the end of the half and led 27 to 5.

With the game already decided, the teams played a shortened second half of fifteen minutes. Clemson scored three additional touchdowns and won the contest 44 to 5. While Georgia Tech was in much better condition than in their first game, Clemson was too fast and well-coached to make the game competitive. McDaniel, playing in his first game just a few days since joining the team, was Tech's best player on both sides of the ball and scored its only touchdown. Cannon, Davis, and B. Moore played well, however, Captain Brinson was criticized for not displaying his usual judgment and for poor positioning on the defensive side. The game was the first played by Georgia Tech's future star, Jesse Thrash.

Following the game, the Georgia Tech players ran off with the game ball, which belonged to Clemson as a trophy for their victory. The Clemson players were not happy as they thought Georgia Tech was trying to steal the ball. Brinson calmed the Clemson players and returned the ball to the team prior to Clemson departing Atlanta the next morning.

Georgia Red and Black (1–0–0) at Georgia Tech Blacksmiths (0–2–0)

Quarter	1	2	Total
Georgia	0	0	0
Georgia Tech	0	0	0

at Brisbine Park • Atlanta, Georgia

- Date: Saturday, October 25, 1902
- Game time: 3:30 p.m.
- Game attendance: 1,500
- Referee: Dorsey
- Headline: Tech Holds Georgia Helpless in a Slow Game at Brisbine Park

This was the sixth meeting in the rivalry with Georgia leading the series 3–1–0. Georgia Tech had not beaten Georgia—let alone score—since 1893. Georgia had previously beaten Furman 11–0 in its only game of the season. Georgia was considered to be a 5–1 favorite, but Tech entered the game healthy for the first time of the season. Tech's captain, Bully Young, returned from injury. The game was originally planned to be played at Piedmont Park but was moved to Brisbine Park on agreement from both teams. The first half was played to twenty minutes and the second half to fifteen. Former Georgia Tech coach, R. B. Nalley, attended the game in support of his alma mater, Georgia, and future Georgia Tech coach and college football hall-of-famer, John Heisman served as the game's timekeeper.

Georgia received the ball first, but the teams merely traded the ball for the entirety of the first half, which featured only a single play of more than ten yards and no scoring. The second half was much of the same, though Georgia was finally able advance the ball deep into Tech's territory towards the end of the game. At the five-yard line, the Blacksmith's defense put up a strong stand and stopped Georgia from scoring on downs. This was the closest either team came to scoring during the game. Time was called with a score of 0–0.

Although entering the game expecting a Georgia win, Georgia Tech gained a lot of confidence in the opening minutes of the game and was happy to keep things even. Captain Young was satisfied with the result and considered the tie a victory. "It was a pretty game and hard fought on both sides," he said. The Georgia Tech fans paraded in the streets after the game.

Georgia Tech Blacksmiths (0–2–1) at Furman Baptists (3–3–1)

Quarter	1	2	Total
Georgia Tech	0	0	0
Furman	0	0	0

at University Grounds • Greenville, South Carolina

- Date: Saturday, November 1, 1902
- Game time: 3:50 p.m.
- Game attendance: Unknown
- Referee: J. A. Forsyth
- Headline: With Weight Against Them Tech Plays Furman to a Standstill

Georgia Tech and Furman played twice previously, both in 1901 with Georgia Tech winning the first match and the teams tying the second. Furman entered the game having already played seven times and sported a 3–3–1 record. In response to the large crowd that witnessed the Georgia Tech–Georgia game a week earlier in Atlanta, Tech and Furman considered moving the game from Greenville to Atlanta for larger ticket returns, but the game remained in Greenville. Admission to the game was fifty cents.

== Players ==
Georgia Tech Techs 1902 game starters
	Auburn	Clemson	Georgia	Furman
Left End	Snowdon	Shackelford	Schackelford	Schackelford
Left Tackle	Motz	Motz	Bully Young (C)	Bully Young (C)
Left Guard	B. Moore	B. Moore	B. Moore	B. Moore
Center	Markert	Markert	Markert	Markert
Right Guard	Cornwell	Cornwell	Cornwell	Cornwell
Right Tackle	Kennard	Jesse Thrash	Jesse Thrash	Jesse Thrash
Right End	Wagner	Wagner	Wagner	Wagner
Quarterback	Paul Brinson	Paul Brinson (C)	Paul Brinson	Paul Brinson
Left Halfback	Davies	Davies	Lycette	Lycette
Right Halfback	Cannon	Cannon	Cannon	Cannon
Fullback	Bully Young (C)	Reddy McDaniel	Reddy McDaniel	Reddy McDaniel
Substitutes	Frank Bell • Gregg • Mathewson • Thornton			
