= 1902 Tulane Olive and Blue football team =

American college football season

1902 Tulane Olive and Blue football
- Conference: Southern Intercollegiate Athletic Association
- Record: 1–4–2 (1–3–2 SIAA)
- Head coach: Virginius Dabney (1st season)
- Captain: Charles Green
- Home stadium: Athletic Park

1902 Southern Intercollegiate Athletic Association football standings
	Conf.					Overall
Team	W		L		T	W		L		T
Clemson $	5	–	0	–	0	6	–	1	–	0
Vanderbilt	6	–	1	–	0	8	–	1	–	0
LSU +	5	–	1	–	0	6	–	1	–	0
Texas	4	–	1	–	0	6	–	3	–	1
Sewanee	4	–	2	–	0	6	–	2	–	0
Tennessee	4	–	2	–	0	6	–	2	–	0
Georgia	3	–	2	–	1	4	–	2	–	1
Ole Miss	3	–	3	–	0	4	–	3	–	0
Nashville	2	–	2	–	0	2	–	4	–	0
Auburn	2	–	4	–	1	2	–	4	–	1
Alabama	2	–	4	–	0	4	–	4	–	0
Cumberland (TN)	1	–	4	–	0	3	–	5	–	0
Tulane	0	–	3	–	2	1	–	4	–	2
Furman	0	–	2	–	1	4	–	3	–	4
Georgia Tech	0	–	4	–	2	0	–	6	–	2
Mississippi A&M	0	–	4	–	1	1	–	4	–	1
Kentucky State	0	–	2	–	0	4	–	6	–	1
$ – Conference champion; + LSU claims a co-championship

The 1902 Tulane Olive and Blue football team was an American football team that represented Tulane University as a member of the Southern Intercollegiate Athletic Association (SIAA) during the 1902 college football season. In their first year under head coach Virginius Dabney, the team compiled an overall record of 1–4–2.

== Schedule ==
Date	Opponent	Site	Result	Attendance	Source
October 18	Tulane alumni*	Athletic Park; New Orleans, LA	W 26–0		
October 25	Auburn	Athletic Park; New Orleans, LA (rivalry)	T 0–0	1,500	
November 1	Mississippi A&M	Athletic Park; New Orleans, LA	T 11–11		
November 8	at Texas A&M*	Fairgrounds; Bryan, TX	L 5–17		
November 15	Vanderbilt	Athletic Park; New Orleans, LA	L 5–23		
November 22	Texas	Athletic Park; New Orleans, LA	L 0–6		
November 27	Ole Miss	Athletic Park; New Orleans, LA (rivalry)	L 0–10		
*Non-conference game
