= 1902 Ole Miss Rebels football team =

American college football season

1902 Ole Miss Rebels football
- Conference: Southern Intercollegiate Athletic Association
- Record: 4–3 (3–3 SIAA)
- Head coach: Daniel S. Martin (1st season)

1902 Southern Intercollegiate Athletic Association football standings
	Conf.					Overall
Team	W		L		T	W		L		T
Clemson $	5	–	0	–	0	6	–	1	–	0
Vanderbilt	6	–	1	–	0	8	–	1	–	0
LSU +	5	–	1	–	0	6	–	1	–	0
Texas	4	–	1	–	0	6	–	3	–	1
Sewanee	4	–	2	–	0	6	–	2	–	0
Tennessee	4	–	2	–	0	6	–	2	–	0
Georgia	3	–	2	–	1	4	–	2	–	1
Ole Miss	3	–	3	–	0	4	–	3	–	0
Nashville	2	–	2	–	0	2	–	4	–	0
Auburn	2	–	4	–	1	2	–	4	–	1
Alabama	2	–	4	–	0	4	–	4	–	0
Cumberland (TN)	1	–	4	–	0	3	–	5	–	0
Tulane	0	–	3	–	2	1	–	4	–	2
Furman	0	–	2	–	1	4	–	3	–	4
Georgia Tech	0	–	4	–	2	0	–	6	–	2
Mississippi A&M	0	–	4	–	1	1	–	4	–	1
Kentucky State	0	–	2	–	0	4	–	6	–	1
$ – Conference champion; + LSU claims a co-championship

The 1902 Ole Miss Rebels football team represented the University of Mississippi during the 1902 Southern Intercollegiate Athletic Association football season.

== Schedule ==
Date	Opponent	Site	Result	Source
October 11	at Vanderbilt	Dudley Field; Nashville, TN (rivalry)	L 0–29	
October 18	Cumberland (TN)	Oxford, MS	W 38–0	
October 25	at Mississippi A&M	Starkville Fairgrounds; Starkville, MS (Egg Bowl)	W 21–0	
November 1	Memphis University School*	Oxford, MS	W 42–0	
November 8	vs. LSU	Athletic Park; New Orleans, LA (rivalry)	L 0–6	
November 15	vs. Tennessee	Red Elm Park; Memphis, TN (rivalry)	L 10–11	
November 27	at Tulane	Athletic Park; New Orleans, LA (rivalry)	W 10–0	
*Non-conference game
