= 1902 Tennessee Volunteers football team =

American college football season

1902 Tennessee Volunteers football
- Conference: Southern Intercollegiate Athletic Association
- Record: 6–2 (4–2 SIAA)
- Head coach: Hubert Fisher (1st season)
- Captain: Nash Buckingham
- Home stadium: Baldwin Park

1902 Southern Intercollegiate Athletic Association football standings
	Conf.					Overall
Team	W		L		T	W		L		T
Clemson $	5	–	0	–	0	6	–	1	–	0
Vanderbilt	6	–	1	–	0	8	–	1	–	0
LSU +	5	–	1	–	0	6	–	1	–	0
Texas	4	–	1	–	0	6	–	3	–	1
Sewanee	4	–	2	–	0	6	–	2	–	0
Tennessee	4	–	2	–	0	6	–	2	–	0
Georgia	3	–	2	–	1	4	–	2	–	1
Ole Miss	3	–	3	–	0	4	–	3	–	0
Nashville	2	–	2	–	0	2	–	4	–	0
Auburn	2	–	4	–	1	2	–	4	–	1
Alabama	2	–	4	–	0	4	–	4	–	0
Cumberland (TN)	1	–	4	–	0	3	–	5	–	0
Tulane	0	–	3	–	2	1	–	4	–	2
Furman	0	–	2	–	1	4	–	3	–	4
Georgia Tech	0	–	4	–	2	0	–	6	–	2
Mississippi A&M	0	–	4	–	1	1	–	4	–	1
Kentucky State	0	–	2	–	0	4	–	6	–	1
$ – Conference champion; + LSU claims a co-championship

The 1902 Tennessee Volunteers football team represented the University of Tennessee in the 1902 Southern Intercollegiate Athletic Association football season. The Volunteers won a school record six games in 1902 and beat rivals Sewanee and Georgia Tech. The team was guided by a new head coach, Hubert Fisher, who came from Princeton University, as did his predecessor, George Kelley.

== Schedule ==
Date	Opponent	Site	Result	Source
October 11	King (TN)*	Baldwin Park; Knoxville, TN	W 12–0	
October 18	Maryville (TN)*	Baldwin Park; Knoxville, TN	W 34–0	
October 25	Vanderbilt	Baldwin Park; Knoxville, TN (rivalry)	L 5–12	
November 1	Sewanee	Baldwin Park; Knoxville, TN	W 6–0	
November 7	at Nashville	Peabody Field; Nashville, TN	W 11–0	
November 15	vs. Ole Miss	Red Elm Park; Memphis, TN (rivalry)	W 11–10	
November 22	at Georgia Tech	Brisbane Park; Atlanta, GA (rivalry)	W 10–6	
November 27	Clemson	Baldwin Park; Knoxville, TN	L 0–11	
*Non-conference game

== Season summary ==
=== Week 1: King ===
The Vols opened the season against King College, winning 12 to 0.

=== Week 2: Maryville ===
In the second week of play, Tennessee beat Maryville 34 to 0.

=== Week 3: Vanderbilt ===
Vanderbilt won 12 to 5 despite a weak line due to its running game. John Edgerton scored both Vanderbilt touchdowns. Tennessee's score, its first ever against Vanderbilt, was provided by an A. H. Douglas run around right end, breaking two tackles and getting the touchdown. Nash Buckingham once had a 40-yard run through the line. Jones Beene was Tennessee's standout on the line.

The starting lineup was: J. Beene (left end), Greene (left tackle), Silcox (left guard), Simerly (center), Caldwell (right guard), Coxe (right tackle), Grimm (right end), Crawford (quarterback), P. Beene (right halfback), Douglas (left halfback), Buckingham (fullback)

=== Week 4: Sewanee ===
Sax Crawford did not play in the Sewanee game. Douglas scored the only touchdown in the 6 to 0 victory.

The starting lineup was: J. Beene (left end), Greene (left tackle), Silcox (left guard), Simerly (center), Caldwell (right guard), Coxe (right tackle), Grimm (right end), Gamble (quarterback), Gettys (right halfback), Douglas (left halfback), Buckingham (fullback).

=== Week 5: at Nashville ===
Tennessee beat coach Neil Snow's Nashville team 11 to 0. Two Nashville scores were called back due to penalties.

The starting lineup was: J. Beene (left end), Greene (left tackle), Silcox (left guard), Simerly (center), Caldwell (right guard), Coxe (right tackle), Grimm (right end), Crawford (quarterback), P. Beene (right halfback), Douglas (left halfback), Buckingham (fullback).

=== Week 6: vs Ole Miss ===
Tennessee edged out Ole Miss 11 to 10 on a muddy Red Elm Park.

The starting lineup was: J. Beene (left end), Greene (left tackle), Silcox (left guard), Simerly (center), Caldwell (right guard), Gudger (right tackle), Grimm (right end), Crawford (quarterback), Gettys (right halfback), Douglas (left halfback), Buckingham (fullback)

=== Week 7: at Georgia Tech ===
Tennessee beat rival Georgia Tech at Brisbane Park 10 to 6.. Crawford returned a kick for the first touchdown. Down 6 to 5 with five minutes left, Tennessee began a drive ending with Green carrying it over.

The starting lineup was: Gamble (left end), Greene (left tackle), Buckingham (left guard), Simerly (center), Ward (right guard), Gudger (right tackle), Grimm (right end), Crawford (quarterback), P. Beene (right halfback), Douglas (left halfback), Gettys (fullback).

=== Week 8: Clemson ===
The team closed the season with an 11 to 0 loss to John Heisman's Clemson Tigers. A. H. Douglas holds the record for the longest punt in school history when he punted a ball 109 yards (the field length was 110 yards in those days) during the Clemson game. Heisman described the kick:

"The day was bitterly cold and a veritable typhoon was blowing straight down the field from one end to the other. We rushed the ball with more consistency than Tennessee, but throughout the entire first half they held us because of the superb punting of "Toots" Douglas, especially because, in that period he had the gale squarely with him. Going against that blizzard our labors were like unto those of Tantalus. Slowly, with infinite pains and a maximum of exertion, we pushed the ball from our territory to their 10-yard line. We figured we had another down to draw on, but the referee begged to differ. He handed the ball to Tennessee and the "tornado." Their general cheerfully chirped a signal – Saxe Crawford, it must have been –; and "Toots" with sprightly step, dropped back for another of his Milky Way punts. I visualize him still, standing on his own goal line and squarely between his uprights. One quick glance he cast overhead – no doubt to make sure that howling was still the same old hurricane.

I knew at once what he proposed to do. The snap was perfect. "Toots" caught the ball, took two smart steps and – BLAM!–away shot the ball as though from the throat of Big Bertha. And, say, in his palmiest mathematical mood, I don't believe Sir Isaac Newton himself could have figured a more perfect trajectory to fit with that cyclone. Onward and upward, upward and onward, the crazy thing flew like a brainchild of Jules Verne. I thought it would clear the Blue Ridge Mountains. Our safety man, the great Johnny Maxwell, was positioned 50 yards behind our rush line, yet the punt sailed over his head like a phantom aeroplane. Finally, it cam down, but still uncured of its wanderlust it started in to roll–toward our goal, of course, with Maxwell chasing and damning it with every step and breath. Finally it curled up and died on our one-footline, after a bowstring journey of just 109 yards."

The starting lineup was: J. Beene (left end), Birmingham (left tackle), Silcox (left guard), Simerly (center), Caldwell (right guard), Green (right tackle), Grimm (right end), Crawford (quarterback), P. Beene (right halfback), Douglas (left halfback), Gettys (fullback)

== Postseason ==
Buckingham and Douglas were selected All-Southern by the Atlanta Constitution.
