= 1902 Mississippi A&M Aggies football team =

American college football season

1902 Mississippi A&M Aggies football
- Conference: Southern Intercollegiate Athletic Association
- Record: 1–4–1 (0–4–1 SIAA)
- Head coach: Jerry Gwin (1st season)

1902 Southern Intercollegiate Athletic Association football standings
	Conf.					Overall
Team	W		L		T	W		L		T
Clemson $	5	–	0	–	0	6	–	1	–	0
Vanderbilt	6	–	1	–	0	8	–	1	–	0
LSU +	5	–	1	–	0	6	–	1	–	0
Texas	4	–	1	–	0	6	–	3	–	1
Sewanee	4	–	2	–	0	6	–	2	–	0
Tennessee	4	–	2	–	0	6	–	2	–	0
Georgia	3	–	2	–	1	4	–	2	–	1
Ole Miss	3	–	3	–	0	4	–	3	–	0
Nashville	2	–	2	–	0	2	–	4	–	0
Auburn	2	–	4	–	1	2	–	4	–	1
Alabama	2	–	4	–	0	4	–	4	–	0
Cumberland (TN)	1	–	4	–	0	3	–	5	–	0
Tulane	0	–	3	–	2	1	–	4	–	2
Furman	0	–	2	–	1	4	–	3	–	4
Georgia Tech	0	–	4	–	2	0	–	6	–	2
Mississippi A&M	0	–	4	–	1	1	–	4	–	1
Kentucky State	0	–	2	–	0	4	–	6	–	1
$ – Conference champion; + LSU claims a co-championship

The 1902 Mississippi A&M Aggies football team represented Mississippi Agricultural & Mechanical College—now known as Mississippi State University—during the 1902 Southern Intercollegiate Athletic Association football season. Led by Jerry Gwin in his first and only season as head coach, the Aggies compiled an overall record of 1–4–1 with a mark of 0–4–1 in conference play.

== Schedule ==
Date	Opponent	Site	Result	Source
October 17	Cumberland (TN)	Starkville Fairgrounds; Starkville, MS	L 6–15	
October 25	Ole Miss	Starkville Fairgrounds; Starkville, MS (rivalry)	L 0–21	
November 1	at Tulane	Athletic Park; New Orleans, LA	T 11–11	
November 8	at Alabama	The Quad; Tuscaloosa, AL (rivalry)	L 0–27	
November 15	at Howard (AL)*	West End Park; Birmingham, AL	W 26–0	
November 27	LSU	Starkville Fairgrounds; Starkville, MS	L 0–6	
*Non-conference game
