= 1902 Clemson Tigers football team =

American college football season

1902 Clemson Tigers football
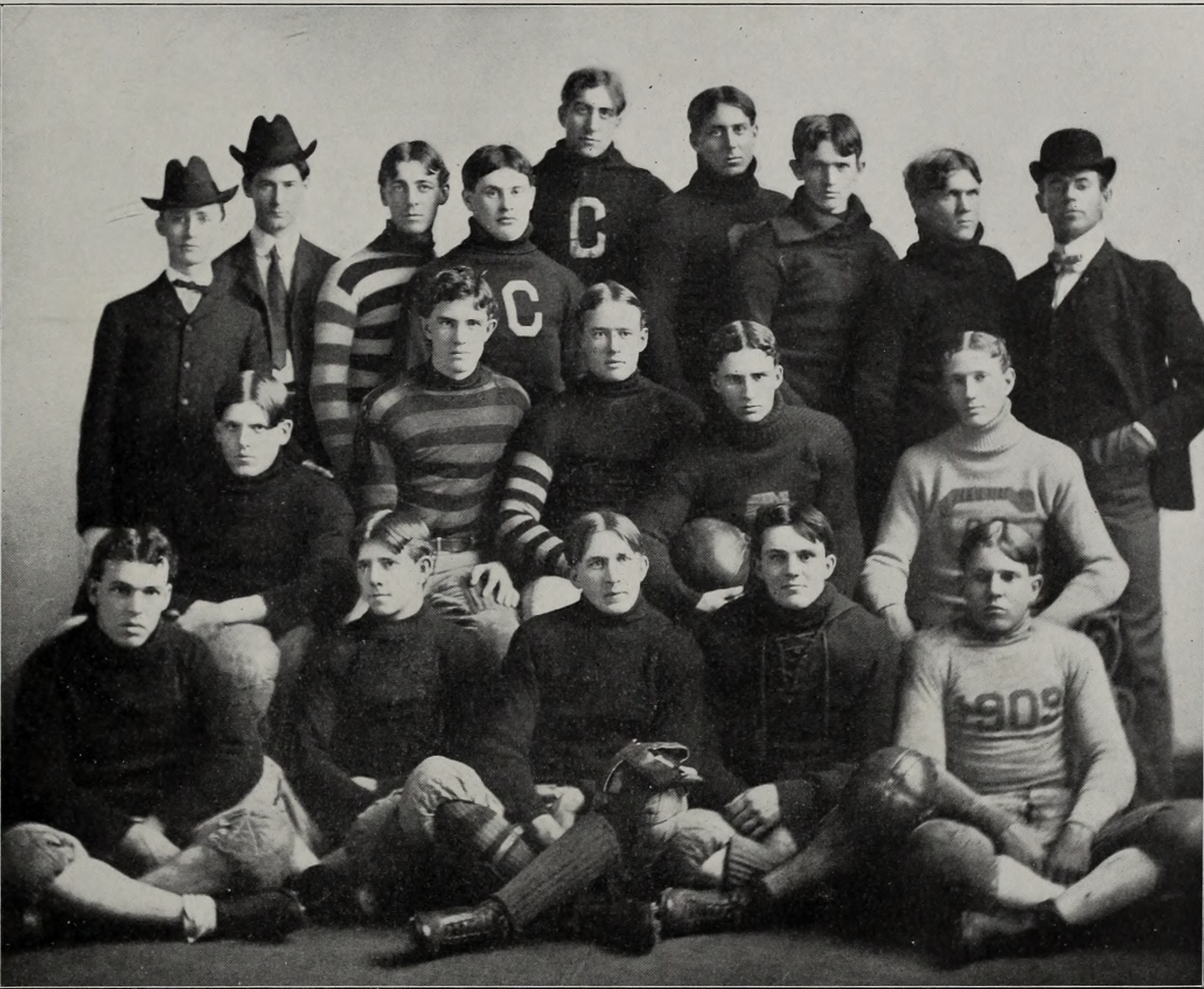

SIAA champion
- Conference: Southern Intercollegiate Athletic Association
- Record: 6–1 (5–0 SIAA)
- Head coach: John Heisman (3rd season)
- Captain: Hope Sadler
- Home stadium: Bowman Field

1902 Southern Intercollegiate Athletic Association football standings
	Conf.					Overall
Team	W		L		T	W		L		T
Clemson $	5	–	0	–	0	6	–	1	–	0
Vanderbilt	6	–	1	–	0	8	–	1	–	0
LSU +	5	–	1	–	0	6	–	1	–	0
Texas	4	–	1	–	0	6	–	3	–	1
Sewanee	4	–	2	–	0	6	–	2	–	0
Tennessee	4	–	2	–	0	6	–	2	–	0
Georgia	3	–	2	–	1	4	–	2	–	1
Ole Miss	3	–	3	–	0	4	–	3	–	0
Nashville	2	–	2	–	0	2	–	4	–	0
Auburn	2	–	4	–	1	2	–	4	–	1
Alabama	2	–	4	–	0	4	–	4	–	0
Cumberland (TN)	1	–	4	–	0	3	–	5	–	0
Tulane	0	–	3	–	2	1	–	4	–	2
Furman	0	–	2	–	1	4	–	3	–	4
Georgia Tech	0	–	4	–	2	0	–	6	–	2
Mississippi A&M	0	–	4	–	1	1	–	4	–	1
Kentucky State	0	–	2	–	0	4	–	6	–	1
$ – Conference champion; + LSU claims a co-championship

The 1902 Clemson Tigers football team represented Clemson Agricultural College—now known as Clemson University—during the 1902 Southern Intercollegiate Athletic Association football season. Under third year head coach John Heisman, the Tigers posted a 6–1 record, including an undefeated Southern Intercollegiate Athletic Association record, and thus a conference championship. The lone loss was to rival South Carolina, in a controversial game ending in riots and banning the contest until 1909.

== Schedule ==
Date	Opponent	Site	Result	Attendance	Source
October 4	North Carolina A&M*	Bowman Field; Calhoun, SC (rivalry)	W 11–5		
October 18	at Georgia Tech	Brisbine Park; Atlanta, GA (rivalry)	W 44–5		
October 24	at Furman	Greenville, SC	W 28–0		
October 30	at South Carolina*	Columbia, SC (rivalry)	L 6–12	5,000	
November 8	Georgia	Bowman Field; Calhoun, SC (rivalry)	W 36–0		
November 15	Auburn	Drill Field; Auburn, AL (rivalry)	W 16–0		
November 27	at Tennessee	Baldwin Park; Knoxville, TN	W 11–0		
*Non-conference game

== Before the season ==
Heisman was paid $815.11 to coach the football team.

The team's captain was Hope Sadler. This was the first season with both Sadler and Carl Sitton at ends. One writer recalls, "Sitton and Hope Sadler were the finest ends that Clemson ever had perhaps."

== Game summaries ==
=== Week 1: North Carolina A&M ===
The season opened with an 11–5 victory over North Carolina A&M. One account reads "Maxwell, the new quarterback, is a jewel."

=== Week 2: at Georgia Tech ===
Clemson defeated Georgia Tech, 44–5. The day before the game, Clemson sent in scrubs to Atlanta, checked into a hotel, and partied until dawn. The varsity sat well rested in Lula, Georgia as Tech betters were fooled.

Clemson scored first on an 80-yard end run from Carl Sitton. The starting lineup was Sitton (left end), Barnwell (left tackle), Kaigler (left guard), Green (center), Forsyth (right guard), DeCosta (right tackle), Sadler (right end), Maxwell (quarterback), Gantt (left halfback), Lawrence (right halfback), Hanvey (fullback).

=== Week 3: at Furman ===
Clemson at Furman

Team	1	2	Total
• Clemson	28	0	28
Furman	0	0	0

- Date: October 24
- Location: Greenville, SC
- Referee: Billy Reynolds

Clemson beat Furman 28–0, making its first touchdown after three minutes of play. On one play, Heisman used a tree to his advantage. The starting lineup was Sitton (left end), Garrison (left tackle), Kaigler (left guard), Green (center), Forsyth (right guard), Barnwell (right tackle), Sadler (right end), Maxwell (quarterback), Politzer (left halfback), Lawrence (right halfback), Hanvey (fullback).

=== Week 4: at South Carolina ===
South Carolina at Clemson

Team	1	2	Total
• SCAR	12	0	12
Clemson	0	6	6

- Date: October 30
- Location: Columbia, SC

Clemson lost 12–6 to South Carolina in Columbia, for the first time since 1896, the first year of the rivalry.

"The Carolina fans that week were carrying around a poster with the image of a tiger with a gamecock standing on top of it, holding the tiger’s tail as if he was steering the tiger by the tail," Jay McCormick said. "Naturally, the Clemson guys didn’t take too kindly to that, and on Wednesday and again on Thursday, there were sporadic fistfights involving brass knuckles and other objects and so forth, some of which resulted, according to the newspapers, in blood being spilled and persons having to seek medical assistance. After the game on Thursday, the Clemson guys frankly told the Carolina students that if you bring this poster, which is insulting to us, to the big parade on Friday, you’re going to be in trouble. And naturally, of course, the Carolina students brought the poster to the parade. If you give someone an ultimatum and they’re your rival, they’re going to do exactly what you told them not to do."

As expected, another brawl broke out before both sides agreed to mutually burn the poster in an effort to defuse tensions. The immediate aftermath resulted in the stoppage of the rivalry until 1909.

Clemson gained only two and a half yards in the first half. On a triple pass around end, Sitton made a 30-yard touchdown in the second half. More than 5,000 saw the game. The starting lineup was Sitton (left end), DeCosta (left tackle), Kaigler (left guard), Green (center), Forsyth (right guard), Barnwell (right tackle), Sadler (right end), Maxwell (quarterback), Lawrence (left halfback), Politzer (right halfback), Hanvey (fullback).

=== Week 5: Georgia ===
Georgia vs. Clemson

Team	1	2	Total
Georgia	0	0	0
• Clemson	12	24	36

- Date: November 8
- Location: Clemson, SC
- Referee: Walter Riggs

On November 8, Clemson defeated the Georgia Bulldogs by a score of 36–0. One writer called it "the hardest fought football game ever seen here." The starting lineup was Sitton (left end), Garrison (left tackle), Kaigler (left guard), Green (center), Forsyth (right guard), Barnwell (right tackle), Sadler (right end), Maxwell (quarterback), Politzer (left halfback), Gantt (right halfback), Hanvey (fullback).

=== Week 6: Auburn ===
Clemson made three touchdowns on Auburn, utilizing double passes at times. The starting lineup was Sitton (left end), Garrison (left tackle), Kaigler (left guard), Green (center), Forsyth (right guard), Barnwell (right tackle), Sadler (right end), Maxwell (quarterback), Politzer (left halfback), Gantt (right halfback), Hanvey (fullback).

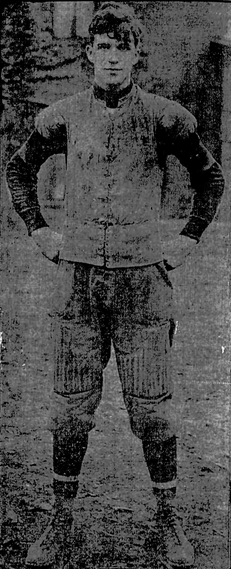
Tootsie Douglas

=== Week 7: at Tennessee ===
Clemson closed the season against Tennessee, which had won a then-school record six games, and won 11–0. Tennessee's Tootsie Douglas holds the record for the longest punt in school history when he punted a ball 109 yards (the field length was 110 yards in those days) in a blizzard. Heisman described the kick:

"The day was bitterly cold and a veritable typhoon was blowing straight down the field from one end to the other. We rushed the ball with more consistency than Tennessee, but throughout the entire first half they held us because of the superb punting of "Toots" Douglas, especially because, in that period he had the gale squarely with him. Going against that blizzard our labors were like unto those of Tantalus. Slowly, with infinite pains and a maximum of exertion, we pushed the ball from our territory to their 10-yard line. We figured we had another down to draw on, but the referee begged to differ. He handed the ball to Tennessee and the "tornado." Their general cheerfully chirped a signal – Saxe Crawford, it must have been –; and "Toots" with sprightly step, dropped back for another of his Milky Way punts. I visualize him still, standing on his own goal line and squarely between his uprights. One quick glance he cast overhead– no doubt to make sure that howling was still the same old hurricane.

I knew at once what he proposed to do. The snap was perfect. "Toots" caught the ball, took two smart steps and – BLAM!–away shot the ball as though from the throat of Big Bertha. And, say, in his palmiest mathematical mood, I don't believe Sir Isaac Newton himself could have figured a more perfect trajectory to fit with that cyclone. Onward and upward, upward and onward, the crazy thing flew like a brainchild of Jules Verne. I thought it would clear the Blue Ridge Mountains. Our safety man, the great Johnny Maxwell, was positioned 50 yards behind our rush line, yet the punt sailed over his head like a phantom aeroplane. Finally, it cam down, but still uncured of its wanderlust it started in to roll–toward our goal, of course, with Maxwell chasing and damning it with every step and breath. Finally it curled up and died on our one-footline, after a bowstring journey of just 109 yards."

Fullback Jock Hanvey starred for Clemson. The starting lineup was Sitton (left end), Garrison (left tackle), Forsythe (left guard), Green (center), Kaigler (right guard), Barnwell (right tackle), Sadler (right end), Maxwell (quarterback), Politzer (left halfback), Gantt (right halfback), Hanvey (fullback).

== Postseason ==
The Tigers claimed an SIAA title. Sadler, Sitton, Maxwell, and Hanvey were All-Southern selections of Walker Reynolds Tichenor.

== Personnel ==
=== Depth chart ===
The following chart provides a visual depiction of Clemson's lineup during the 1902 season with games started at the position reflected in parentheses. The chart mimics the offense in a T formation.

LE
Carl Sitton

LT	LG	C	RG	RT
W. D. Garrison	Ben Kaigler	Harry Green	Pee Wee Forsythe	T. G. Barnwell
Beef DeCosta				

RE
Hope Sadler

QB
John Maxwell

LHB	FB	RHB
Polly Politzer	Jock Hanvey	Bert Lawrence
		Jonnie Gant

-
