= 1902 LSU Tigers football team =

American college football season

1902 LSU Tigers football
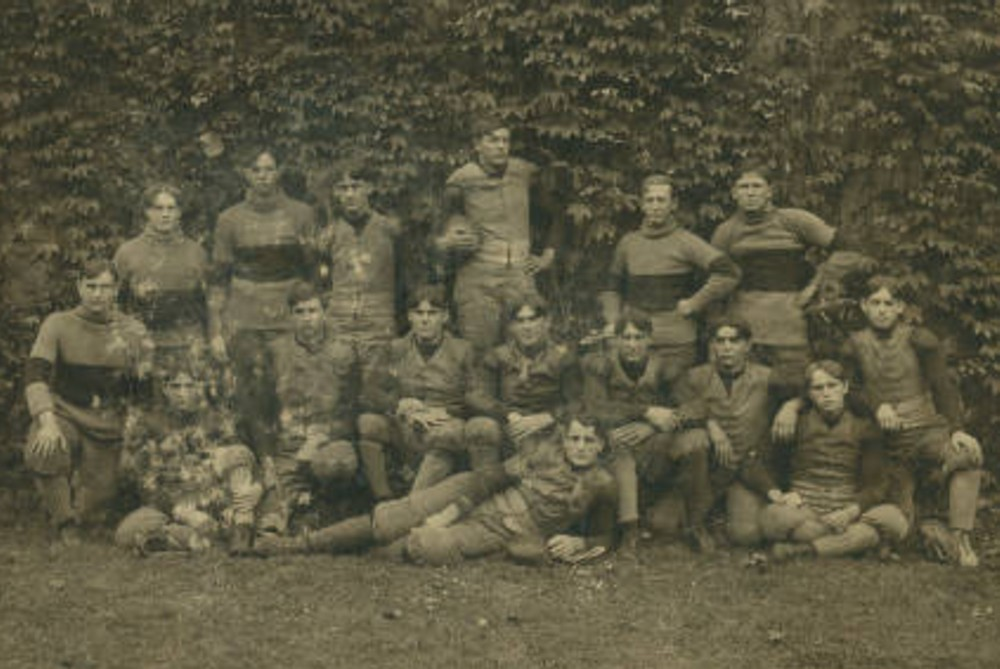

SIAA co-champion
- Conference: Southern Intercollegiate Athletic Association
- Record: 6–1 (5–1 SIAA)
- Head coach: W. S. Borland (2nd season)
- Captain: Henry E. Landry
- Home stadium: State Field

1902 Southern Intercollegiate Athletic Association football standings
	Conf.					Overall
Team	W		L		T	W		L		T
Clemson $	5	–	0	–	0	6	–	1	–	0
Vanderbilt	6	–	1	–	0	8	–	1	–	0
LSU +	5	–	1	–	0	6	–	1	–	0
Texas	4	–	1	–	0	6	–	3	–	1
Sewanee	4	–	2	–	0	6	–	2	–	0
Tennessee	4	–	2	–	0	6	–	2	–	0
Georgia	3	–	2	–	1	4	–	2	–	1
Ole Miss	3	–	3	–	0	4	–	3	–	0
Nashville	2	–	2	–	0	2	–	4	–	0
Auburn	2	–	4	–	1	2	–	4	–	1
Alabama	2	–	4	–	0	4	–	4	–	0
Cumberland (TN)	1	–	4	–	0	3	–	5	–	0
Tulane	0	–	3	–	2	1	–	4	–	2
Furman	0	–	2	–	1	4	–	3	–	4
Georgia Tech	0	–	4	–	2	0	–	6	–	2
Mississippi A&M	0	–	4	–	1	1	–	4	–	1
Kentucky State	0	–	2	–	0	4	–	6	–	1
$ – Conference champion; + LSU claims a co-championship

The 1902 LSU Tigers football team represented the Tigers of Louisiana State University during the 1902 Southern Intercollegiate Athletic Association football season. W. S. Borland returned in 1902 for his second season as LSU head coach. The seven-game 1902 season was the longest for the Tigers since their first game in 1893 and also featured the most games on the road: five games played away and only two in Baton Rouge. Despite a single conference loss to Vanderbilt, the 1902 LSU team claimed an SIAA co-championship with Clemson.

== Schedule ==
Date	Opponent	Site	Result	Attendance	Source
October 16	at Southwestern Louisiana*	Lafayette, LA	W 42–0		
October 18	vs. Texas	Fairgrounds; San Antonio, TX	W 4–0		
October 27	Auburn	State Field; Baton Rouge, LA (rivalry)	W 5–0	2,000	
November 8	vs. Ole Miss	Athletic Park; New Orleans, LA (rivalry)	W 6–0		
November 17	Vanderbilt	State Field; Baton Rouge, LA	L 27–5	1,000	
November 27	at Mississippi A&M	Starkville Fairgrounds; Starkville, MS (rivalry)	W 6–0		
November 29	at Alabama	The Quad; Tuscaloosa, AL (rivalry)	W 11–0		
*Non-conference game

== Game summaries ==
=== Texas ===
In one of the season's "liveliest games" in San Antonio, LSU upset Texas 4–0, using its speed and teamwork.

=== Auburn ===
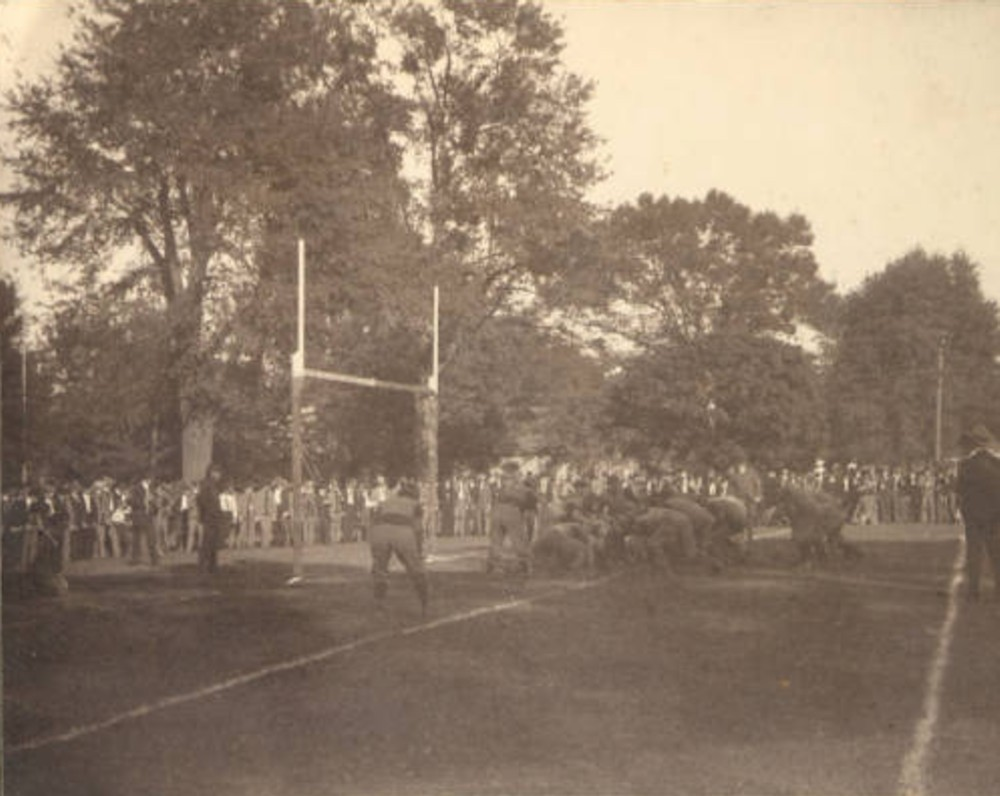
Players near the goal line in 1902 LSU vs. Auburn game at State Field

LSU beat Auburn in a hard-fought game 5–0. Captain Henry Landry scored the game's only touchdown. "Nearly every business house in Baton Rouge closed at noon and everybody went to the game". The trip to Louisiana made some Auburn players sick.

The starting lineup was Gueno (left end), Guldry (left tackle), Leseur (left guard), Sharp (center), Klock (right guard), Rhodes (right tackle), Martin (right end), Coleman (quarterback), Mundinger (left halfback), Kennedy (right halfback), Landry (fullback).

=== Vanderbilt ===
- The Nashville Banner gave this report on the Monday, November 17 game in Baton Rouge against LSU:

"Vanderbilt defeated Louisiana State University, 27 to 5, yesterday. It was an ideal day and about 1,000 people witnessed the game. A place kick only saved Louisiana State University from a whitewash. The game was lacking in interest, for Vanderbilt displayed her superiority so strongly that Louisiana was outclassed.

"Louisiana State University kicked off and Vanderbilt advanced the ball steadily for a touch-down. This was repeated, Tigert making the two touchdowns. Louisiana State University got the ball only once in the first half and lost on downs. At the end of the half the score stood 11 to 0.

"Vanderbilt kicked off and Louisiana State University lost on downs in the second half. The visitors advanced the ball for a touchdown. Davis failed, in kicking a goal. Louisiana State University seemed to be very weak. Vanderbilt made her gains every time, and only lost the ball on fumbles. Louisiana State University never advanced far before losing on downs, they were entirely outclassed in weight and skill. It is hard to say who were the star players for Vanderbilt. Every man played a good game. The playing of Edgerton, Davis, Tigert, and Lawler deserves special notice. For Louisiana State University the playing of Sales, deserves notice.

"The Vanderbilt boys are sore over the treatment they received. The Louisiana State University team couldn't take defeat in a sportsmanlike manner. They claimed that Vanderbilt knew their signals and made uncomplimentary remarks from their sidelines, and altogether the treatment was not as good as the team expected. Vanderbilt played a harder game than at Tulane, and Louisiana State University has a much better team than Tulane. Vanderbilt played a much faster game than Louisiana State University and every trick was a success. Louisiana State University depended entirely on straight football and never succeeded in working any trick.

"The teams were entertained with an elegant dinner after the game by Mr. W. P. Connell, and the University Athletic Association invited the two teams to a theatre party."

=== Alabama ===
Landry scored both touchdowns in an 11–0 defeat of Alabama to close the season.
