= 1902 Auburn Tigers football team =

American college football season

1902 Auburn Tigers football
- Conference: Southern Intercollegiate Athletic Association
- Record: 2–4–1 (2–4–1 SIAA)
- Head coach: Ralph S. Kent (1st season; first 5 games); M. S. Harvey (1st season; final 2 games)
- Captain: Henry S. Park; H. A. Allison

1902 Southern Intercollegiate Athletic Association football standings
	Conf.					Overall
Team	W		L		T	W		L		T
Clemson $	5	–	0	–	0	6	–	1	–	0
Vanderbilt	6	–	1	–	0	8	–	1	–	0
LSU +	5	–	1	–	0	6	–	1	–	0
Texas	4	–	1	–	0	6	–	3	–	1
Sewanee	4	–	2	–	0	6	–	2	–	0
Tennessee	4	–	2	–	0	6	–	2	–	0
Georgia	3	–	2	–	1	4	–	2	–	1
Ole Miss	3	–	3	–	0	4	–	3	–	0
Nashville	2	–	2	–	0	2	–	4	–	0
Auburn	2	–	4	–	1	2	–	4	–	1
Alabama	2	–	4	–	0	4	–	4	–	0
Cumberland (TN)	1	–	4	–	0	3	–	5	–	0
Tulane	0	–	3	–	2	1	–	4	–	2
Furman	0	–	2	–	1	4	–	3	–	4
Georgia Tech	0	–	4	–	2	0	–	6	–	2
Mississippi A&M	0	–	4	–	1	1	–	4	–	1
Kentucky State	0	–	2	–	0	4	–	6	–	1
$ – Conference champion; + LSU claims a co-championship

The 1902 Auburn Tigers football team represented Auburn University in the 1902 college football season. The team finished the season with a record of 2–4–1. The Tigers were coached by two men that year: Ralph S. Kent and M. S. Harvey. A little over halfway through the season, Kent stepped down after going 2–2–1. Harvey followed and in his only season as head coach went 0–2. The Tigers only played one true home game in Auburn, Alabama, on November 15 against Clemson.

== Schedule ==
Date	Opponent	Site	Result	Attendance	Source
October 11	at Georgia Tech	Brisbine Park; Atlanta, GA (rivalry)	W 18–6		
October 18	at Alabama	West End Park; Birmingham, AL (Iron Bowl)	W 23–0	2,500	
October 25	at Tulane	Athletic Park; New Orleans, LA (rivalry)	T 0–0	1,500	
October 27	at LSU	State Field; Baton Rouge, LA (rivalry)	L 0–5	2,000	
November 6	vs. Sewanee	West End Park; Birmingham, AL	L 0–6		
November 15	Clemson	Drill Field; Auburn, AL (rivalry)	L 0–16		
November 27	vs. Georgia	Piedmont Park; Atlanta, GA (rivalry)	L 5–12		
