= 1902 Kentucky State College Blue and White football team =

American college football season

1902 Kentucky State College Blue and White football
- Conference: Southern Intercollegiate Athletic Association
- Record: 3–5–1 (0–2 SIAA)
- Head coach: E. W. McLeod (1st season)
- Captain: John H. L. Vogt
- Home stadium: State College grounds

1902 Southern Intercollegiate Athletic Association football standings
	Conf.					Overall
Team	W		L		T	W		L		T
Clemson $	5	–	0	–	0	6	–	1	–	0
Vanderbilt	6	–	1	–	0	8	–	1	–	0
LSU +	5	–	1	–	0	6	–	1	–	0
Texas	4	–	1	–	0	6	–	3	–	1
Sewanee	4	–	2	–	0	6	–	2	–	0
Tennessee	4	–	2	–	0	6	–	2	–	0
Georgia	3	–	2	–	1	4	–	2	–	1
Ole Miss	3	–	3	–	0	4	–	3	–	0
Nashville	2	–	2	–	0	2	–	4	–	0
Auburn	2	–	4	–	1	2	–	4	–	1
Alabama	2	–	4	–	0	4	–	4	–	0
Cumberland (TN)	1	–	4	–	0	3	–	5	–	0
Tulane	0	–	3	–	2	1	–	4	–	2
Furman	0	–	2	–	1	4	–	3	–	4
Georgia Tech	0	–	4	–	2	0	–	6	–	2
Mississippi A&M	0	–	4	–	1	1	–	4	–	1
Kentucky State	0	–	2	–	0	4	–	6	–	1
$ – Conference champion; + LSU claims a co-championship

The 1902 Kentucky State College Blue and White football team represented Kentucky State College—now known as the University of Kentucky—as a member of the Southern Intercollegiate Athletic Association (SIAA) during the 1902 college football season. Led by E. W. McLeod in his first and only season as head coach, the Blue and White compiled an overall record of 3–5–1 with a mark of 0–2 in SIAA play.

== Schedule ==
Date	Time	Opponent	Site	Result	Source
September 27		Q & C Railroad	Lexington, KY	W 22–0	
October 4		Miami (OH)	Lexington, KY	W 11–5	
October 18		Georgetown (KY)	Lexington, KY	W 28–0	
October 25		at Nashville	Nashville, TN	L 0–11	
October 27		at Mooney School	Murfreesboro, TN	L 0–23	
November 1		at Central University (KY)	Danville, KY (rivalry)	L 0–15	
November 8		at Louisville YMCA	Eclipse Park; Louisville, KY	L 0–17	
November 15	2:30 p.m.	Cincinnati	State College grounds; Lexington, KY	T 6–6	
November 27		Kentucky University	Lexington, KY	L 5–6	
