= Jones Beene =

American football player and coach (1882–1968)

Biographical details
- Born: November 26, 1882; Tennessee, U.S.
- Died: May 6, 1968 (aged 85)

Playing career
- 1901–1905: Tennessee
- Position: End

Coaching career (HC unless noted)
- 1908: Chattanooga
- ?: Tennessee Wesleyan

Accomplishments and honors

Awards
- All-Southern (1904)

Jones C. Beene Jr. (November 26, 1882 – May 6, 1968) was a college football player and coach.

== University of Tennessee ==
Beene was a prominent end for the Tennessee Volunteers of the University of Tennessee.

=== 1902 ===
His blocking and tackling received praise in the Vanderbilt game of 1902.

=== 1904 ===
Beene was selected All-Southern in 1904.

== Coaching career ==
=== Chattanooga ===
He coached the Chattanooga Mocs in the 1908 season.

=== Tennessee Wesleyan ===
He was also the first coach of the Tennessee Wesleyan Bulldogs.

== Head coaching record ==
Year	Team	Overall	Conference	Standing	Bowl/playoffs
Chattanooga Moccasins (Independent) (1908)
1908	Chattanooga	4–4			
Chattanooga:		4–4			
Total:		4–4			
