= 1902 Alabama Crimson White football team =

American college football season

1902 Alabama Crimson White football
- Conference: Southern Intercollegiate Athletic Association
- Record: 4–4 (2–4 SIAA)
- Head coach: Eli Abbott (4th season)
- Captain: James Forman
- Home stadium: The Quad; West End Park

1902 Southern Intercollegiate Athletic Association football standings
	Conf.					Overall
Team	W		L		T	W		L		T
Clemson $	5	–	0	–	0	6	–	1	–	0
Vanderbilt	6	–	1	–	0	8	–	1	–	0
LSU +	5	–	1	–	0	6	–	1	–	0
Texas	4	–	1	–	0	6	–	3	–	1
Sewanee	4	–	2	–	0	6	–	2	–	0
Tennessee	4	–	2	–	0	6	–	2	–	0
Georgia	3	–	2	–	1	4	–	2	–	1
Ole Miss	3	–	3	–	0	4	–	3	–	0
Nashville	2	–	2	–	0	2	–	4	–	0
Auburn	2	–	4	–	1	2	–	4	–	1
Alabama	2	–	4	–	0	4	–	4	–	0
Cumberland (TN)	1	–	4	–	0	3	–	5	–	0
Tulane	0	–	3	–	2	1	–	4	–	2
Furman	0	–	2	–	1	4	–	3	–	4
Georgia Tech	0	–	4	–	2	0	–	6	–	2
Mississippi A&M	0	–	4	–	1	1	–	4	–	1
Kentucky State	0	–	2	–	0	4	–	6	–	1
$ – Conference champion; + LSU claims a co-championship

The 1902 Alabama Crimson White football team (Note: Alabama football teams were not referred to as the "Crimson Tide" until the 1907 season. Prior to 1907, the team was called the "Crimson White" from 1893 to 1906 and the "Cadets" in 1892.) (variously "Alabama", "UA" or "Bama") represented the University of Alabama in the 1902 college football season. The team was led by head coach Eli Abbott, in his only season of his second stint (fourth season overall), and played their home games at The Quad in Tuscaloosa and at West End Park in Birmingham, Alabama. James O. Heyworth served as a co-head coach with Abbott for the season. In what was the tenth season of Alabama football, the team finished with a record of four wins and four losses (4–4, 2–4 SIAA).

== Schedule ==
Date	Opponent	Site	Result	Attendance	Source
October 10	Birmingham High School*	The Quad; Tuscaloosa, AL	W 57–0		
October 13	Marion*	The Quad; Tuscaloosa, AL	W 81–0		
October 18	Auburn	West End Park; Birmingham, AL (rivalry)	L 0–23	2,500	
November 1	Georgia	West End Park; Birmingham, AL (rivalry)	L 0–5		
November 8	Mississippi A&M	The Quad; Tuscaloosa, AL (rivalry)	W 27–0		
November 18	Texas	The Quad; Tuscaloosa, AL	L 0–10		
November 27	Georgia Tech	West End Park; Birmingham, AL (rivalry)	W 26–0		
November 29	LSU	The Quad; Tuscaloosa, AL (rivalry)	L 0–11		
*Non-conference game

- Scoring note: (Note: For the 1902 season, point values were different from those used in contemporary games. In 1902 a touchdown was worth five points, a field goal was worth five points and a conversion (PAT) was worth one point.)

== Game summaries ==
=== Birmingham High School ===
Alabama opened the 1902 season with a 57–0 victory over Birmingham High School in Tuscaloosa.

=== Marion ===
Against the Marion Military Institute, Alabama scored the most offensive points in the young history of the program with their 81–0 victory. In the game touchdowns were scored by Frederick Grist Stickney and W. H. Arrington (with three each); Frank Montague Lett, William Swift Sherrill and James Forman (with two each); and R. L. Lodge, H. M. Smith and Gessner T. McCorvery (with one each).

=== Auburn ===
Against the Alabama Polytechnic Institute (now known as Auburn University) Alabama was defeated 23–0 at West End Park in Birmingham. Auburn took an 11–0 lead in the first half on a one-yard H. A. Allison touchdown run and a ten-yard Bill Patterson touchdown run. Auburn then scored their final points of the game on a pair of Allison touchdown runs of 75 and two yards for the 23–0 victory.

=== Georgia ===
Against the University of Georgia, Alabama was shut out for the second consecutive game with their 5–0 loss at Birmingham. Marvin M. Dickinson scored the only touchdown of the game for Georgia in the second half. Alabama was trying to tie up the game late, but time expired as the Tide reached the Georgia twelve-yard line.

=== Mississippi A&M ===
After consecutive losses, Alabama defeated the Aggies of Mississippi A&M (now known as Mississippi State University) 27–0 on The Quad. Alabama scored touchdowns in the first half on runs by Frederick Grist Stickney, 45-yards by Auxford Burks and 30-yards by James Forman. In the second half, touchdowns were scored on runs of 20-yards from Burks and a Stickney run.

=== Texas ===
In the first all-time meeting against the University of Texas, Alabama lost 10–0 on The Quad. In a game dominated by both defenses early, Texas scored their first touchdown with only 0:13 remaining in the first half on a ten-yard John A. Jackson. He then scored the only other touchdown in the second half for the 10–0 Longhorn victory.

=== Georgia Tech ===
In the first all-time meeting against Georgia Tech, Alabama won 26–0 at Birmingham. Alabama took a 5–0 halftime lead after James Forman scored the only points of the first half on a seven-yard touchdown run. Alabama then scored four second half touchdown from Forman, Frederick Grist Stickney and two by Auxford Burks for the 26–0 victory.

=== LSU ===
Alabama closed the 1902 season two days after their victory over Georgia Tech with an 11–0 loss against LSU at Tuscaloosa. Henry Landry scored both touchdowns for LSU in the victory.

== Players ==
Guards

- W. H. Arrington
- Harmon Burns
- J. C. Fortune
- J. C. Granade
- Frank Montague Lett

Tackles

- R. L. Daniel
- James Forman
- H. H. Jones

Center

- James C. Gwin

Ends

- R. L. Lodge
- John Roberts Peavy
- W. S. Sherrill

Backs

- Auxford Burks
- G. M. Edwards
- Gessner T. McCorvery
- W. McMahon
- H. M. Smith
- Frederick Grist Stickney
- W. S. Wyatt
- Cecil Hugh Young
