= 1902 Georgia Bulldogs football team =

American college football season

1902 Georgia Bulldogs football
- Conference: Southern Intercollegiate Athletic Association
- Record: 4–2–1 (3–2–1 SIAA)
- Head coach: William A. Reynolds (2nd season)
- Captain: Frank M. Ridley
- Home stadium: Herty Field

1902 Southern Intercollegiate Athletic Association football standings
| | Conf. | | | | | Overall |
| Team | W | | L | | T | W | | L | | T |
|---|---|---|---|---|---|---|---|---|---|---|
| Clemson $ | 5 | – | 0 | – | 0 | 6 | – | 1 | – | 0 |
| Vanderbilt | 6 | – | 1 | – | 0 | 8 | – | 1 | – | 0 |
| LSU + | 5 | – | 1 | – | 0 | 6 | – | 1 | – | 0 |
| Texas | 4 | – | 1 | – | 0 | 6 | – | 3 | – | 1 |
| Sewanee | 4 | – | 2 | – | 0 | 6 | – | 2 | – | 0 |
| Tennessee | 4 | – | 2 | – | 0 | 6 | – | 2 | – | 0 |
| Georgia | 3 | – | 2 | – | 1 | 4 | – | 2 | – | 1 |
| Ole Miss | 3 | – | 3 | – | 0 | 4 | – | 3 | – | 0 |
| Nashville | 2 | – | 2 | – | 0 | 2 | – | 4 | – | 0 |
| Auburn | 2 | – | 4 | – | 1 | 2 | – | 4 | – | 1 |
| Alabama | 2 | – | 4 | – | 0 | 4 | – | 4 | – | 0 |
| Cumberland (TN) | 1 | – | 4 | – | 0 | 3 | – | 5 | – | 0 |
| Tulane | 0 | – | 3 | – | 2 | 1 | – | 4 | – | 2 |
| Furman | 0 | – | 2 | – | 1 | 4 | – | 3 | – | 4 |
| Georgia Tech | 0 | – | 4 | – | 2 | 0 | – | 6 | – | 2 |
| Mississippi A&M | 0 | – | 4 | – | 1 | 1 | – | 4 | – | 1 |
| Kentucky State | 0 | – | 2 | – | 0 | 4 | – | 6 | – | 1 |
$ – Conference champion; + LSU claims a co-championship

The 1902 Georgia Bulldogs football team represented the University of Georgia during the 1902 Southern Intercollegiate Athletic Association football season. The Bulldogs compiled a 4–2–1 record, including victories over Auburn and Alabama and a 0–0 tie with Georgia Tech. The losses included Georgia's fourth consecutive loss to Sewanee. This was the team's second and final season under the guidance of head coach William A. Reynolds.

== Schedule ==
| Date | Opponent | Site | Result | Source |
|---|---|---|---|---|
| October 18 | Furman | Herty Field; Athens, GA | W 11–0 | |
| October 25 | at Georgia Tech | Brisbine Park; Atlanta, GA (rivalry) | T 0–0 | |
| November 1 | at Alabama | West End Park; Birmingham, AL (rivalry) | W 5–0 | |
| November 8 | at Clemson | Bowman Field; Calhoun, SC (rivalry) | L 0–36 | |
| November 14 | Davidson | Herty Field; Athens, GA | W 20–0 | |
| November 18 | vs. Sewanee | Brisbine Park; Atlanta, GA | L 0–11 | |
| November 27 | vs. Auburn | Piedmont Park; Atlanta, GA (rivalry) | W 12–5 | |

== Before the season ==
Frank M. Ridley was captain-elect, Georgia's first two-time captain. He was moved to end from the backfield. One account of Ridley reads "Ridley's first year on the team he played this position so well that Coach Heisman named his as the All-Southern end. He is quick and active and never hesitates to tackle a man, seldom being blocked."

== Game summaries ==
=== Furman ===
To open the season, Georgia beat Furman 11–0. The game's highlight was an end run for touchdown from Harman.

=== Georgia Tech ===
Georgia came in as 6–1 favorites to in-state rival Georgia Tech, and were held to a 0–0 tie. "It's the worst game we have ever played." said captain Ridley. The starting lineup was Bower (left end), Willingham (left tackle), Beaver (left guard), Ketron (center), Nix (right guard), Smith (right tackle), Baxter (right end), Harman (quarterback), Dickinson (left halfback), Ridley (right halfback), Turner (fullback).

=== Alabama ===
Alabama was shutout 5–0 at Birmingham. Marvin M. Dickinson scored the only touchdown of the game for Georgia in the second half. Alabama was trying to tie up the game late, but time expired as the Tide reached the Georgia twelve-yard line.

The starting lineup was Bower (left end), McIntosh (left tackle), Beaver (left guard), Ketron (center), Willingham (right guard), Smith (right tackle), Baxter (right end), Harman (quarterback), Dickinson (left halfback), Ridley (right halfback), Turner (fullback).

=== Davidson ===
Davidson was defeated 20–0.

=== Clemson ===
Georgia vs. Clemson

| Team | 1 | 2 | Total |
|---|---|---|---|
| Georgia | 0 | 0 | 0 |
| • Clemson | 12 | 24 | 36 |

- Date: November 8
- Location: Clemson, SC
- Referee: Walter Riggs

On November 8, Georgia lost to SIAA champion Clemson by a score of 36–0. Despite the score, one writer called it "the hardest fought football game ever seen here." Frank McIntyre, Harman, and Smith all had to be carried off the field.

The starting lineup was Baxter (left end), McIntosh (left tackle), Beaver (left guard), Ketron (center), Willingham (right guard), Smith (right tackle), Ridley (right end), Harman (quarterback), Allen (left halfback), Dickinson (right halfback), Turner (fullback).

=== Sewanee ===
Sewanee defeated Georgia 11–0.

=== Auburn ===
Georgia upset Auburn 12–5. The same night, Rufus Nalley, great former Georgia star, died. Having learned of Georgia's victory; "He died with a smile on his lips", reported his brother.

== Postseason ==
Ridley was selected an All-Southern along with teammates Harold Ketron and Sandy Beaver,
