= 1902 Sewanee Tigers football team =

American college football season

1902 Sewanee Tigers football
- Conference: Southern Intercollegiate Athletic Association
- Record: 6–2 (4–2 SIAA)
- Head coach: L. W. Boynton (1st season)
- Captain: Henry D. Phillips
- Home stadium: Hardee Field

1902 Southern Intercollegiate Athletic Association football standings
	Conf.					Overall
Team	W		L		T	W		L		T
Clemson $	5	–	0	–	0	6	–	1	–	0
Vanderbilt	6	–	1	–	0	8	–	1	–	0
LSU +	5	–	1	–	0	6	–	1	–	0
Texas	4	–	1	–	0	6	–	3	–	1
Sewanee	4	–	2	–	0	6	–	2	–	0
Tennessee	4	–	2	–	0	6	–	2	–	0
Georgia	3	–	2	–	1	4	–	2	–	1
Ole Miss	3	–	3	–	0	4	–	3	–	0
Nashville	2	–	2	–	0	2	–	4	–	0
Auburn	2	–	4	–	1	2	–	4	–	1
Alabama	2	–	4	–	0	4	–	4	–	0
Cumberland (TN)	1	–	4	–	0	3	–	5	–	0
Tulane	0	–	3	–	2	1	–	4	–	2
Furman	0	–	2	–	1	4	–	3	–	4
Georgia Tech	0	–	4	–	2	0	–	6	–	2
Mississippi A&M	0	–	4	–	1	1	–	4	–	1
Kentucky State	0	–	2	–	0	4	–	6	–	1
$ – Conference champion; + LSU claims a co-championship

The 1902 Sewanee Tigers football team was an American football team that represented Sewanee: The University of the South as a member of the Southern Intercollegiate Athletic Association (SIAA) during the 1902 college football season. In their first year under head coach L. W. Boynton, the team compiled a 6–2 record.

== Schedule ==
Date	Time	Opponent	Site	Result	Source
October 4		Mooney*	Hardee Field; Sewanee, TN	W 39–0	
October 10		vs. Texas	Fairgrounds; Dallas, TX	L 0–11	
October 20		Central University*	Hardee Field; Sewanee, TN	Canceled	
October 25	3:00 p.m.	at Washington University*	League Park; St. Louis, MO	W 22–6	
November 1		at Tennessee	Baldwin Park; Knoxville, TN	L 0–6	
November 6		vs. Auburn	West End Park; Birmingham, AL	W 6–0	
November 18		at Georgia	Brisbane Park; Atlanta, GA	W 11–0	
November 21		Cumberland (TN)	Hardee Field; Sewanee, TN	W 22–0	
November 27		at Vanderbilt	Dudley Field; Nashville, TN (rivalry)	W 11–5	
*Non-conference game
