= 1902 Furman Baptists football team =

American college football season

1902 Furman Baptists football

State champion
- Conference: Southern Intercollegiate Athletic Association
- Record: 4–3–4 (0–2–1 SIAA)
- Head coach: Charles Roller (2nd season)
- Captain: A. T. Sublett

1902 Southern Intercollegiate Athletic Association football standings
	Conf.					Overall
Team	W		L		T	W		L		T
Clemson $	5	–	0	–	0	6	–	1	–	0
Vanderbilt	6	–	1	–	0	8	–	1	–	0
LSU +	5	–	1	–	0	6	–	1	–	0
Texas	4	–	1	–	0	6	–	3	–	1
Sewanee	4	–	2	–	0	6	–	2	–	0
Tennessee	4	–	2	–	0	6	–	2	–	0
Georgia	3	–	2	–	1	4	–	2	–	1
Ole Miss	3	–	3	–	0	4	–	3	–	0
Nashville	2	–	2	–	0	2	–	4	–	0
Auburn	2	–	4	–	1	2	–	4	–	1
Alabama	2	–	4	–	0	4	–	4	–	0
Cumberland (TN)	1	–	4	–	0	3	–	5	–	0
Tulane	0	–	3	–	2	1	–	4	–	2
Furman	0	–	2	–	1	4	–	3	–	4
Georgia Tech	0	–	4	–	2	0	–	6	–	2
Mississippi A&M	0	–	4	–	1	1	–	4	–	1
Kentucky State	0	–	2	–	0	4	–	6	–	1
$ – Conference champion; + LSU claims a co-championship

The 1902 Furman Baptists football team represented Furman University during the 1902 Southern Intercollegiate Athletic Association football season. Led by Charles Roller in his second and final season as head coach, Furman compiled an overall record of 4–3–4 with a mark of 0–2–1 in SIAA play. The team played five games in two weeks, and Atlanta Constitution rated fullback A. T. Sublett All-Southern. The team defeated South Carolina, who had defeated SIAA champion Clemson, and so claimed a state championship. Furman also defeated NC State (then North Carolina A & M) that year 5 to 2, "Captain Sublett, of the Furman team, really won the game with sensational kick of goal."

== Schedule ==
Date	Opponent	Site	Result	Source
October 3	at Bingham Military School*	Riverside Park; Asheville, NC	W 12–0	
October 6	North Carolina A&M*	University Grounds; Greenville, SC	T 0–0	
October 10	at Davidson*	Davidson, NC	W 6–0	
October 11	at North Carolina*	Chapel Hill, NC	L 0–10	
October 13	at North Carolina A&M*	Fairgrounds; Raleigh, NC	W 5–2	
October 18	at Georgia	Herty Field; Athens, GA	L 0–11	
October 24	Clemson	Greenville, SC	L 0–28	
November 1	Georgia Tech	Greenville, SC	T 0–0	
November 10	St. Albans (VA)*	Greenville, SC	T 0–0	
November 14	South Carolina*	University Grounds; Greenville, SC	W 14–0	
November 27	at Charleston AA*	Baseball Park; Charleston, SC	T 5–5	
*Non-conference game
