= 1902 Nashville Garnet and Blue football team =

American college football season

1902 Nashville Garnet and Blue football
- Conference: Southern Intercollegiate Athletic Association
- Record: 2–4 (2–2 SIAA)
- Head coach: Neil Snow (1st season)
- Home stadium: Peabody Field

1902 Southern Intercollegiate Athletic Association football standings
	Conf.					Overall
Team	W		L		T	W		L		T
Clemson $	5	–	0	–	0	6	–	1	–	0
Vanderbilt	6	–	1	–	0	8	–	1	–	0
LSU +	5	–	1	–	0	6	–	1	–	0
Texas	4	–	1	–	0	6	–	3	–	1
Sewanee	4	–	2	–	0	6	–	2	–	0
Tennessee	4	–	2	–	0	6	–	2	–	0
Georgia	3	–	2	–	1	4	–	2	–	1
Ole Miss	3	–	3	–	0	4	–	3	–	0
Nashville	2	–	2	–	0	2	–	4	–	0
Auburn	2	–	4	–	1	2	–	4	–	1
Alabama	2	–	4	–	0	4	–	4	–	0
Cumberland (TN)	1	–	4	–	0	3	–	5	–	0
Tulane	0	–	3	–	2	1	–	4	–	2
Furman	0	–	2	–	1	4	–	3	–	4
Georgia Tech	0	–	4	–	2	0	–	6	–	2
Mississippi A&M	0	–	4	–	1	1	–	4	–	1
Kentucky State	0	–	2	–	0	4	–	6	–	1
$ – Conference champion; + LSU claims a co-championship

The 1902 Nashville Garnet and Blue football team represented the University of Nashville during the 1902 Southern Intercollegiate Athletic Association football season. The team was coached by Neil Snow. Transylvania's W. Yancey ran for two 80-yard touchdowns.

After the season, Snow resigned never to coach again, accepting a construction position in New York.

== Schedule ==
Date	Opponent	Site	Result	Attendance	Source
October 8	Cumberland (TN)	Peabody Field; Nashville, TN	W 11–0		
October 11	at Kentucky University*	Fourth Street Field; Lexington, KY	L 0–17	400	
October 18	Virginia*	Athletic Park; Nashville, TN	L 0–27		
October 25	Kentucky State College	Athletic Park; Nashville, TN	W 11–0		
November 7	Tennessee	Peabody Field; Nashville, TN	L 0–11		
November 15	Texas	Peabody Field; Nashville, TN	L 5–11		
*Non-conference game
