= A. T. Sublett =

American football and baseball player (1883–1961)

Profile
- Position: Fullback

Personal information
- Born: May 11, 1883; Lockhart, Texas, U.S.
- Died: September 23, 1961 (aged 78); Westminster, South Carolina, U.S.
- Listed height: 6 ft 2 in (1.88 m)

Career information
- College: Furman (1900–1902)

Awards and highlights
- All-Southern (1902)

Alvah Tindal "Sub" Sublett (May 11, 1883 – September 23, 1961) was a college football and baseball player.

== Early life ==
Though born in Texas, he grew up in Summerton, South Carolina. Alvah was the son of the Baptist Reverend Richard Anderson Sublette. The Sublettes were French Huguenots by ancestry.

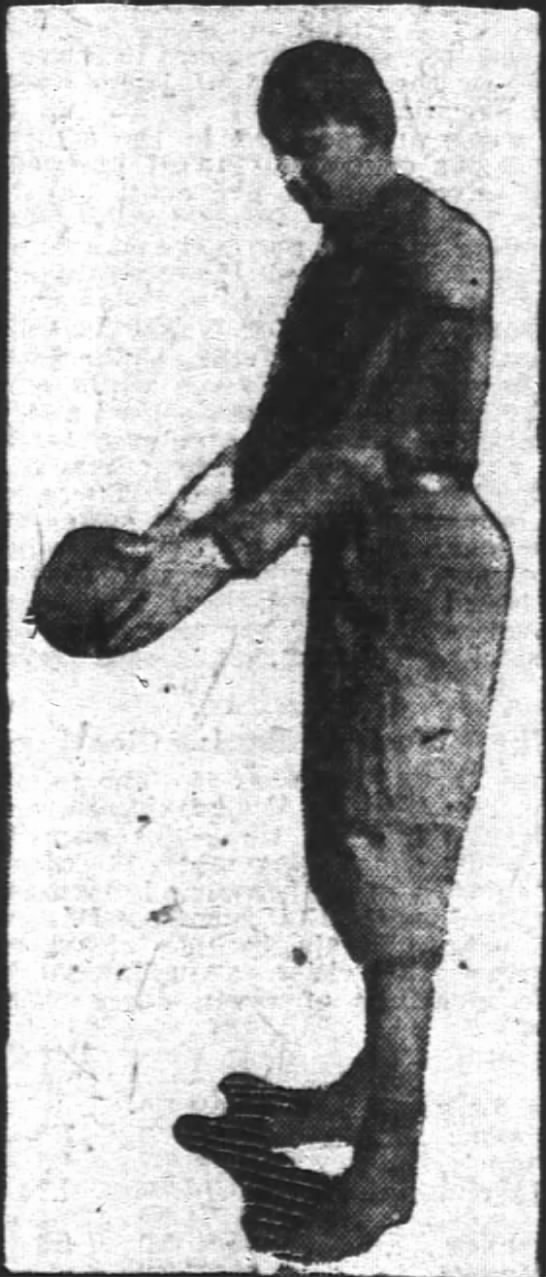
Sublett c. 1902

== College ==
=== Furman ===
Sublett was a prominent fullback, punter and drop-kicker for the Furman Paladins of Furman University, captain of the 1901 and 1902 teams coached by Charles Roller. Sublett was also captain of the baseball team.

==== 1902 ====
He was selected for the All-Southern team of the Atlanta Constitution in 1902, a season in which Furman played five games in two weeks, and defeated South Carolina. Furman also defeated NC State (then North Carolina A & M) that year 5 to 2, "Captain Sublett, of the Furman team, really won the game with sensational kick of goal." Furman's football program was abolished for a decade after 1902.

=== Vanderbilt ===
Sublett also attended Vanderbilt University in 1904 and 1905, a member of Phi Kappa Sigma.

== Greenville ==
He was later a real estate broker in Greenville.

== See also ==
- 1902 College Football All-Southern Team
