= Jerry Gwin =

American football coach, engineer (1880–1959)

Biographical details
- Born: February 25, 1880; Conort, Jefferson County, Alabama, U.S.
- Died: February 5, 1959 (aged 78); Birmingham, Alabama, U.S.
- Education: Auburn (B.S., 1902)

Playing career
- 1899: Auburn
- Position: Center

Coaching career (HC unless noted)
- 1902: Mississippi A&M

Head coaching record
- Overall: 1–4–1

Jeremiah Warren "Jerry" Gwin Sr. (February 25, 1880 – February 5, 1959) was an American college football coach and engineer. He served as the head football coach at Mississippi Agricultural & Mechanical College—now known as Mississippi State University—for one season, in 1902, compiling a record of 1–4–1.

Gwin graduated from Alabama Polytechnic Institute—now known as Auburn University—in 1902. He later worked an engineer for the Tennessee Coal and Iron Division of U.S. Steel and then for Jefferson County, Alabama. Gwin died on February 5, 1959, at a hospital in Birmingham, Alabama.

== Head coaching record ==
Year	Team	Overall	Conference	Standing	Bowl/playoffs
Mississippi A&M Aggies (Southern Intercollegiate Athletic Association) (1902)
1902	Mississippi A&M	1–4–1	0–4–1		
Mississippi A&M:		1–4–1	0–4–1		
Total:		1–4–1			
