= Ralph S. Kent =

American football coach and lawyer (1878–1949)

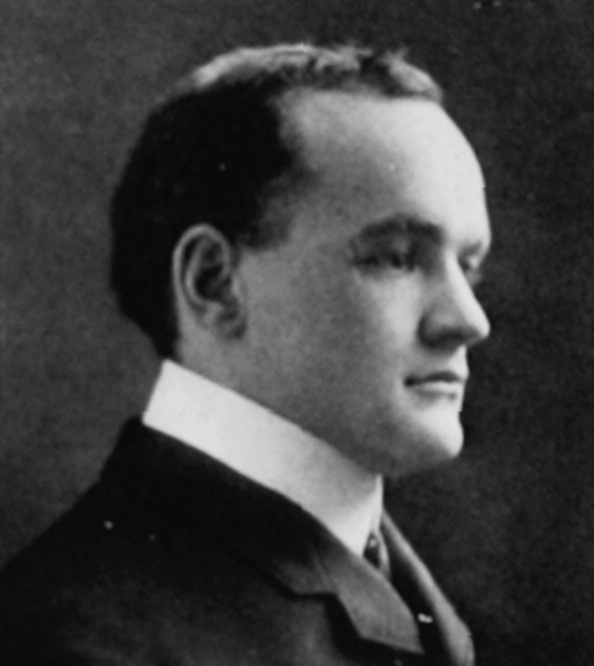
- Kent pictured in The Class Book 1902, Cornell University

Biographical details
- Born: August 2, 1878; Genoa, Ohio, U.S.
- Died: April 3, 1949 (aged 70); Stamford, Connecticut, U.S.

Playing career
- 1901: Cornell
- Position: Center

Coaching career (HC unless noted)
- 1902: Auburn

Head coaching record
- Overall: 2–2–1

Ralph Sherlock Kent (August 2, 1878 – April 3, 1949) was an American college football coach. He served as the head football coach at Auburn University for the first five games of the 1902 season, compiling a record of 2–2–1. Kent returned to Cornell to finish up law school after coaching at Auburn. He later become a prominent lawyer in the Buffalo area. He married Alice Kyle.

Kent died of heart disease in 1949 at the age of 70.

== Head coaching record ==
Year	Team	Overall	Conference	Standing	Bowl/playoffs
Auburn Tigers (Southern Intercollegiate Athletic Association) (1902)
1902	Auburn	2–2–1 (Note: M. S. Harvey coached the last two games of the season.)	2–2–1		
Auburn:		2–2–1	2–2–1		
Total:		2–2–1			
