= J. B. Hart =

American football player and coach

John B. Hart
Playing career
- 1901: Yale
- Position(s): Halfback

Coaching career (HC unless noted)
- 1902: Texas

Head coaching record
- Overall: 6–3–1

John B. Hart was an American football player and coach. The Yale University graduate served as head coach of the University of Texas at Austin in 1902. He holds a 6–3–1 record at Texas.

At 5 ft 5 in (1.65 m) and weighing 130 pounds (59 kg; 9.3 st) Hart was one of the smallest backs Yale ever had. Hart had to leave Texas after a 12–0 loss to Texas A&M.

== Head coaching record ==
Year	Team	Overall	Conference	Standing	Bowl/playoffs
Texas Longhorns (Southern Intercollegiate Athletic Association) (1902)
1902	Texas	6–3–1	4–1	T–3rd	
Texas:		6–3–1	4–1		
Total:		6–3–1			
