= Neil Snow =

American football player and coach (1879–1914)

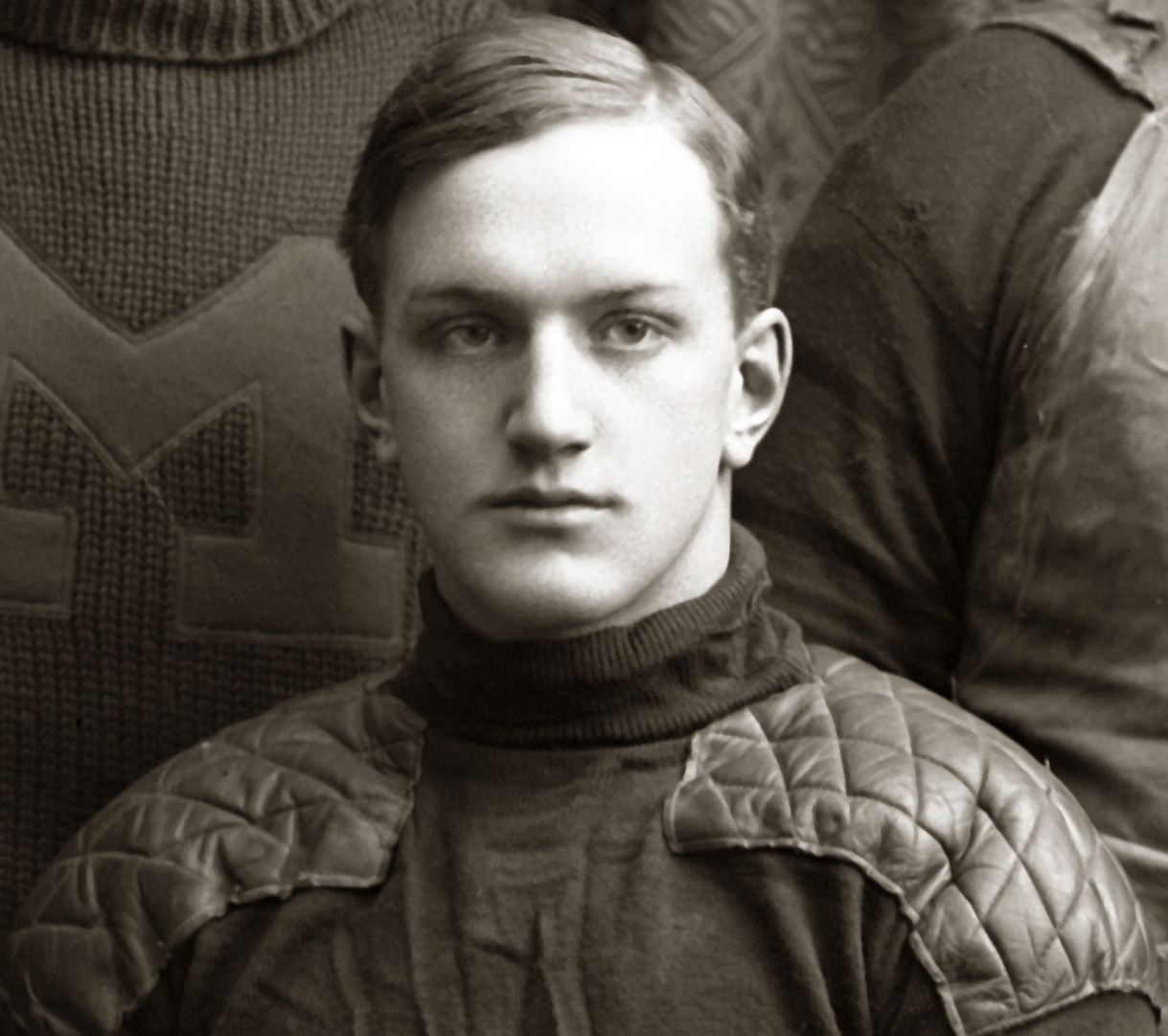
- Snow in 1900 (from Michigan football team photograph)

Biographical details
- Born: November 10, 1879; Detroit, Michigan, U.S.
- Died: January 22, 1914 (aged 34); Detroit, Michigan, U.S.

Playing career
- 1898–1901: Michigan
- Positions: End, fullback

Coaching career (HC unless noted)
- 1902: Nashville

Head coaching record
- Overall: 2–4

Accomplishments and honors

Championships
- National (1901)

Awards
- Consensus All-American (1901); Third-team All-American (1899); Rose Bowl Player of the Game (1902)
- College Football Hall of Fame; Inducted in 1960 (profile)

Neil Worthington Snow (November 10, 1879 – January 22, 1914) was an American athlete. He competed in American football, baseball, and track and field at the University of Michigan from 1898 to 1902. He was selected as a first-team All-American football player in 1901 and the MVP of the 1902 Rose Bowl, a game in which he scored five touchdowns. He was posthumously inducted into the College Football Hall of Fame in 1960.

== Early years ==
Snow was born into a wealthy family in Detroit, and attended local Central High School. While in high school, Snow was an exceptional bowler, competing in the Peninsular and Junior leagues and leading his league in average one years. He was also a boxer of "considerable prowess".

== University of Michigan ==
At the University of Michigan, Snow was the captain of the football, baseball and track teams, and had the distinction of winning more varsity letters than any other man — four in baseball, four in football and three in track. He stood 5 feet 8 inches and weighed 190 pounds. At least one 1905 newspaper account reported that he also lettered in tennis. Various reports differ as to whether he received 10, 11, or 12 varsity letters at Michigan.

While at Michigan, Snow was also a mandolin player of "great talent," and was a member of the mandolin, guitar and banjo club. He was also regarded as "one of the best students in the university." In January 1902, the Detroit Free Press opined: "There is no student in the country who is more entitled to the distinction of being an ideal collegian than Neil Snow."

=== Football ===
Snow played four seasons for the Michigan Wolverines football team from 1898 to 1901. As a freshman, he started all ten games at the end position. The 1898 team went 10–0 and won Michigan's first Western Conference football championship, finishing the season with a 12–11 win over the University of Chicago that inspired Louis Elbel to write The Victors, Michigan's fight song. Elbel's lyric, "Champions of the West", refers to Michigan's having won the Western Conference championship for the first time in the school's history.

In 1899, Snow started seven games at right end. In December 1899, he was elected by his teammates to be captain of Michigan's 1900 football team.

As the junior team captain in 1900, he started nine games at right end and led Michigan to a 7-2-1 record. In December 1900, Snow was defeated in his bid for re-election as captain of the football team by a vote of 15 to 7.

Snow's fame grew as a result of his role on the 1901 Michigan Wolverines football team, considered by some the greatest Michigan football team of all time. In Fielding H. Yost's first year as coach, Yost switched Snow to the fullback position where he started all 11 games. Yost played Snow at fullback on offense but at end on defense. Yost later compared Snow to Jim Thorpe for his athletic versatility and opined, "I don't think I have ever seen a better end than he was." Grantland Rice also compared Snow to Thorpe for his talent in football, baseball, and track, and opined that Thorpe was "nothing like Snow's equal on the ballfield."

Michigan finished 11–0, did not allow a single point to be scored by an opposing team, and outscored its opponents 550–0. The 1901 Wolverines became known as the "point-a-minute" team, as their offensive production resulted in an average of one point being scored every minute. The 1901 team was invited to play in the first Rose Bowl game on January 1, 1902, a 49–0 win over Stanford. Snow scored five touchdowns in the 1902 Rose Bowl, as follows:

- A five-yard run for a touchdown in the first half for the game's first points;
- A two-yard run for a touchdown in the second half to extend Michigan's lead to 22–0;
- An eight-yard run to extend the Michigan lead to 33–0;
- A 17-yard run to extend the Michigan lead to 38–0; and
- A four-yard run to extend the lead to 44–0.

Snow's five touchdowns and 25 points (touchdowns counted for five points) in the 1902 Rose Bowl is still the all-time Rose Bowl record. Snow was named the Most Valuable Player of the game when the award was created in 1953 and selections were made retroactively. Snow was also named an All-American by Caspar Whitney in the December 1901 issue of Collier's magazine — the only Western player named to the All-American team for 1901 and only the second player in Michigan history (William Cunningham was the first) to receive the honor. Whitney wrote: "To be fast, to break interference, and to be wise about the time of going in, make up the requisites of an end rusher, and all of these Snow possessed in a marked degree."

=== Baseball ===
As a baseball player, Snow was an outfielder and a major contributor to two Western Conference championship teams. He batted over .390 in 1899 and over .320 in 1900. Snow was described as "a man of splendid physique and an especially good batter." His final game as a Wolverine baseball player was a 7–4 win over Cornell, in which Snow was responsible for six runs, including three RBIs on a bases-loaded triple.

At the conclusion of his collegiate athletic career, Snow reportedly "had all the makings of a great player" and was "besieged with offers" from professional baseball clubs, but had other plans, and "thus a star was lost from baseball." Horace Fogel of the New York Giants tried to entice Snow to play baseball for the National League team, asking Snow to name his price. Fogel's wire to Snow reportedly read, "What are your terms to play with New York", to which Snow replied tersely, "Am not on the market." Snow's father, Frank E. Snow, told a reporter at the time that, while his son had received "many fine offers" to play professional baseball, he would prefer his son "adopt something else as a means of making a livelihood."

=== Track and field ===
Snow also excelled in track and field. In 1902, he won the Western Conference high jump championship. He competed in the 40-yard hurdles with a time of 5-1/5 seconds, in the high jump with a height of five feet, nine inches, in the shot put with a distance of 39 feet, 9 inches, in the discus throw with a distance of 105 feet, and in the hammer throw with a distance of 118 feet.

Snow's commitments to multiple sports placed a strain on his time. As a senior in 1902, Snow excelled in the shot put. Seeking to focus on the shot put, Snow resigned the captaincy of the baseball team in February 1902. At the time, Snow told a reporter:

A captain ought to be on the field during all practice hours, and if I filled the position I would not feel at liberty to leave the diamond to go over and take coaching for a field event. Besides, I have college work that keeps me busy until 5 o'clock three times a week. I will do all I can for the baseball team, however, and there is nothing but good feelings between all the candidates.

== Coaching career ==
Snow coached football at the University of Nashville in 1902. After that season, he resigned never to coach again, accepting a construction position in New York.

== Later years ==
In June 1905, Snow's younger brother broke his neck in an accident in switching sand cars at Hammond, Indiana. Newspaper accounts indicate that Neil Snow hurried to his brother's bedside at St. Margaret's hospital in Hammond.

Snow's principal career after college was with the Detroit Drill Twist Company, where he became the company's treasurer, general manager, and eventually its president. Snow continued to remain involved in sports and was a popular choice as an official for football games for the Eastern and Western schools. One writer noted: "The larger colleges in the East had come to realize with what great efficiency Neil Snow acted as an official and his services were eagerly sought."

=== Death ===
Snow died suddenly in January 1914 at age 34. He became ill after a game of squash at the Detroit Racquet and Curling Club and after having his dinner, took a taxi cab to his doctor's office, where he collapsed and died from a heart attack. At the time of Snow's death, noted American poet, Edgar A. Guest published the following poem as a tribute to Snow:

The whistle sounds: The game is o'er! We pay tribute now with tears. Instead of smiling eyes and cheers.

Neil Snow has crossed the line once more

Life's scrimmage ends! A manly soul Now passes bravely through the night Undaunted still and Spotless White

Neil Snow has made another goal

The crowds depart. The setting sun Blazes his pathway to the west. The stamp of valor's on his breast.

Neil Snow the Master's M has won.

Snow's sudden death at age 34 was seen as a cautionary tale of "the great over-do it age." He was cited as proof that endless competition puts undue strain on the heart and nerves, with one article noting: "Snow was big and powerful and always in fine condition. Yet after a hard squash game he died in less than five minutes, where 20 minutes before he had seemed to be in perfect health."

== Honors and accolades ==
In the popular 1916 book Football Days: Memories of the Game and of the Men Behind the Ball, William Hanford Edwards wrote the following about Snow:

The University of Michigan never graduated a man who was more universally loved than Neil Snow. What he did and the way he did it has become a tradition at Michigan. He was idolized by every one who knew him. As a player and captain he set a wonderful example for his men to pattern after. He was a powerful player, possessing such determination and fortitude that he would go through a stone wall if he had to. He was their great all-around athlete; good in football, baseball and track. ... [W]hen I grew to know him, I soon realized how his great, quiet, modest, though wonderful personality, made everybody idolize him. Modesty was his most noticeable characteristic. He was always the last to talk of his own athletic achievements.

The noted football expert Walter Camp said of Snow: "No college ever developed a better all-around athlete."

He has been called "the greatest all-round athlete ever graduated from the University of Michigan" and was named a member of Fielding H. Yost's "all-time" Michigan team at the right end position.

In 1907, The Washington Post named Snow one of the three greatest football players to have played in the West, along with Walter Eckersall and Willie Heston. The Post opined that Snow was an end quite worthy to rank with the great ends of the East and that he "was just the kind of man who would have been suited to the advanced requirements of the new game and its additional demand for alertness, in an end."

In 1916, the Oakland Tribune published an article ranking Snow as one of North America's greatest all-around athletes, naming Snow, Elmer Oliphant and Christy Mathewson as the runners-up to Jim Thorpe. The Tribune wrote of Snow:

Undoubtedly one of the greatest was the late Neil Snow of Michigan. Snow stood as one of the great football players of the game. He was an all-American end and a great plunging full back. As a ball player he batted over .390 for Michigan his last two years and received at least three good offers from big league clubs. He was one of the best college first basemen that ever lived. On the track Snow could high jump around six feet; he could put the shot 45 feet; he was a fine hurdler. Taking both quality and quantity, we should say that Snow was the equal at least of any man that has been mentioned.

Sports writer Grantland Rice often wrote about Snow, ranking him as one of the three greatest all-around athletes ever turned out in college sport along with Jim Thorpe and Elmer Oliphant. Rice called Snow "a football marvel, hurdler, jumper and shot putter and one of the best ball players Michigan ever knew."

In 1960, he was inducted into the College Football Hall of Fame.

== Head coaching record ==
Year	Team	Overall	Conference	Standing	Bowl/playoffs
Nashville Garnet and Blue (Southern Intercollegiate Athletic Association) (1902)
1902	Nashville	2–4	2–2	T–8th	
Nashville:		2–4	2–2		
Total:		2–4			

== See also ==
- List of Michigan Wolverines football All-Americans
