= William Ayres Reynolds =

American football player and sports coach (1874–1928)

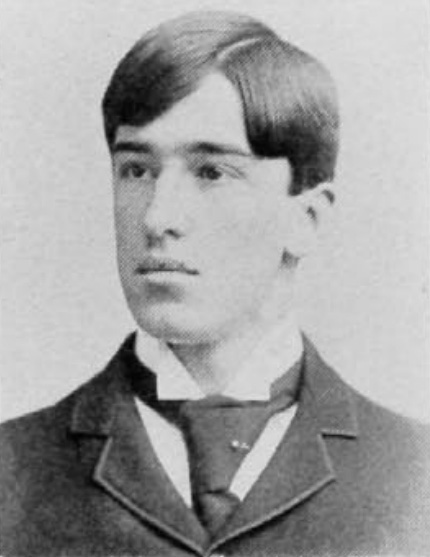
- Reynolds pictured in The Cincinnatian 1896, Cincinnati yearbook

Biographical details
- Born: December 30, 1872; Oxford, Pennsylvania, U.S.
- Died: August 10, 1928 (aged 53); Charlotte, North Carolina, U.S.

Playing career

Football
- 1893–1894: Princeton scrub team

Coaching career (HC unless noted)

Football
- 1895: Rutgers
- 1895: Sewanee
- 1896: Cincinnati
- 1897–1900: North Carolina
- 1901–1902: Georgia

Baseball
- 1898–1899: North Carolina
- 1902–1903: Georgia

Track and field
- 1903: Georgia

Head coaching record
- Overall: 38–21–9 (football); 34–14–2 (baseball)

William Ayres Reynolds (December 30, 1872 or December 30, 1874 – August 10, 1928) was an American football player and coach of football and baseball. He played scrub football at Princeton University, serving as team captain in 1894, and played in at least one game for the varsity. He served as the head football coach at Rutgers University (1895), Sewanee: The University of the South (1895), the University of Cincinnati (1896), the University of North Carolina (1897–1900), and the University of Georgia (1901–1902), compiling a career record of 38–21–9. Reynolds was also the head baseball coach at North Carolina (1898–1899) and Georgia (1902–1903), tallying a career mark of 24–14–2.

As North Carolina's football coach, he coached the Tar Heels to an undefeated season in 1898 (9–0) and had an overall record of 27–7–4 during his four seasons. As a baseball coach, Reynolds compiled a 21–5–1 record in two seasons at North Carolina.

Reynolds did not enjoy the same level of success at Georgia in either sport. As the Georgia football head coach, he compiled a record of just 5–7–3 during his two-year stay. As a baseball coach, Reynolds fared better, posting a 13–9–1 record over two seasons.

Reynolds left Georgia in 1903 to pursue a business opportunity in Canada. He was later the vice president of the Southern Cotton Oil Co, original manufacturers of Wesson cooking oil. He died on August 10, 1928, at his home in Charlotte, North Carolina.

== Head coaching record ==
=== Football ===
Year	Team	Overall	Conference	Standing
Rutgers Queensmen (Independent) (1895)
1895	Rutgers	0–2		
Rutgers:		0–2		
Sewanee Tigers (Southern Intercollegiate Athletic Association) (1895)
1895	Sewanee	2–2–1	0–2	
Sewanee:		2–2–1	0–2	
Cincinnati (Independent) (1896)
1896	Cincinnati	4–3–1		
Cincinnati:		4–3–1		
North Carolina Tar Heels (Independent) (1897–1898)
1897	North Carolina	7–3		
1898	North Carolina	9–0		
North Carolina Tar Heels (Southern Intercollegiate Athletic Association) (1899–1900)
1899	North Carolina	7–3–1	1–1	
1900	North Carolina	4–1–3	3–0–1	
North Carolina:		27–7–4	4–1–1	
Georgia Bulldogs (Southern Intercollegiate Athletic Association) (1901–1902)
1901	Georgia	1–5–2	0–3–2	
1902	Georgia	4–2–1	3–2–1	
Georgia:		5–7–3	3–5–3	
Total:		38–21–9		
