= Athletic Park (New Orleans) =

Stadium in New Orleans, Louisiana, US

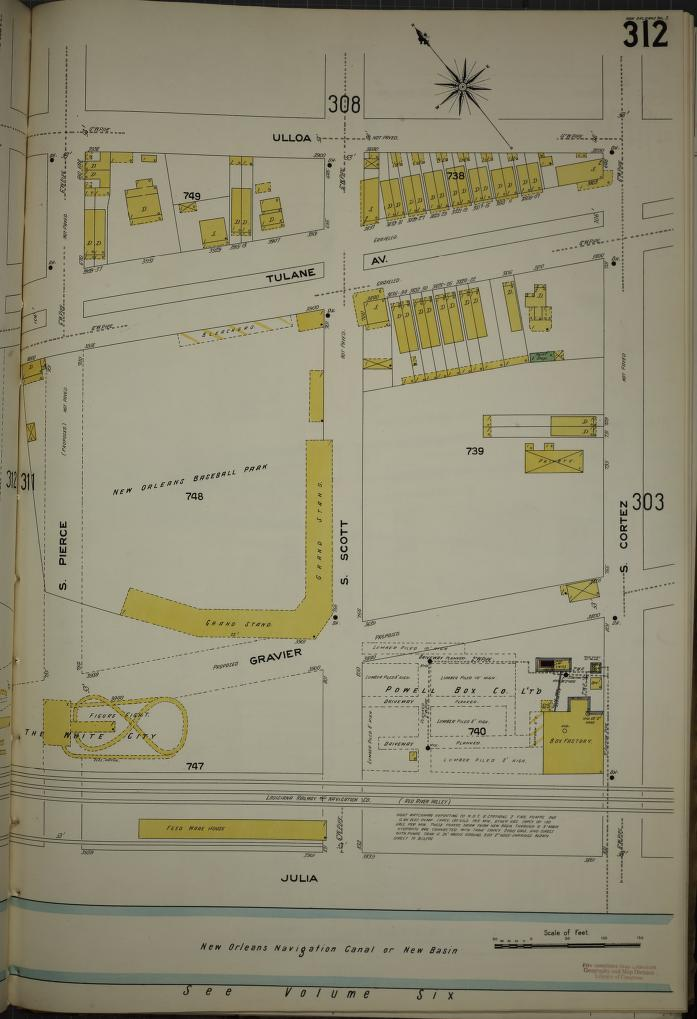
- Athletic Park, Sanborn Fire Insurance Map, New Orleans 1908
- Interactive map of Athletic Park
- Location: New Orleans, Louisiana
- Coordinates: 29°58′6″N 90°6′21″W
- Surface: Grass

Construction
- Opened: 1901

Tenants
- New Orleans Pelicans (baseball) (1901–1908); Tulane Green Wave (football) (1901–1908); Cleveland Indians (MLB) (spring training) (1902–1903)

Athletic Park was a sports stadium in New Orleans, Louisiana, which opened in 1901. Some sources say the ballpark was located on the south side of Tulane Avenue between South Carrollton Avenue and South Pierce Street. The Sanborn map from 1908 shows the actual boundaries as Tulane Avenue (northeast, right field), Scott Street (southeast, first base), the proposed Gravier Street extension, and then railroad tracks and the canal (southwest, third base); and the proposed Pierce Street extension (northwest, overlapping left field). Carrolton Avenue was a block west of Pierce.

When the Pelicans moved a few blocks up the street to Pelican Park, this site was replaced by an amusement park called White City. The Pelicans would move back to this area a few years later and build a new facility called Heinemann Park.

It was home to the New Orleans Pelicans baseball organization from 1901 to 1908. It was also home to the Tulane Green Wave football team from 1901 to 1908.

It was the spring training home of the Cleveland Indians from 1902 to 1903.

== See also ==
- New Orleans Pelicans (baseball)
- Tulane Green Wave football
- Sports in New Orleans
