= 1904 Marshall Thundering Herd football team =

American college football season

1904 Marshall Thundering Herd football
- Conference: Independent
- Record: 1–3–3
- Head coach: George Ford (2nd season)
- Captain: Roy Grass
- Home stadium: Central Field

1904 Southern college football independents records
	Conf.			Overall
Team	W	L	T	W		L		T
Georgetown		–		7	–	1	–	0
Southwest Texas State		–		5	–	1	–	0
Southwestern Louisiana Industrial		–		2	–	0	–	1
Davidson		–		6	–	1	–	1
Navy		–		7	–	2	–	1
North Carolina		–		5	–	2	–	2
Virginia		–		6	–	3	–	0
North Carolina A&M		–		3	–	1	–	2
West Virginia		–		6	–	3	–	0
VPI		–		5	–	3	–	0
George Washington		–		4	–	2	–	2
Arkansas		–		4	–	3	–	0
Oklahoma		–		4	–	3	–	1
South Carolina		–		4	–	3	–	1
Stetson		–		2	–	2	–	0
Central Oklahoma		–		2	–	3	–	0
VMI		–		3	–	5	–	0
Kentucky University		–		3	–	4	–	0
Grant		–		2	–	3	–	0
Florida State College		–		2	–	3	–	0
Maryland		–		2	–	4	–	2
East Florida Seminary		–		1	–	2	–	0
Goldey College		–		1	–	2	–	0
Baylor		–		2	–	5	–	1
Louisiana Industrial		–		1	–	4	–	0
TCU		–		1	–	4	–	1
Delaware		–		1	–	5	–	1
Kendall		–		0	–	2	–	1
Rollins		–		0	–	1	–	0
Tusculum		–		0	–	2	–	0
Birmingham		–		0	–	3	–	0
Florida at Lake City		–		0	–	5	–	0
Oklahoma A&M		–		0	–	6	–	0
Tennessee Docs		–		0	–	7	–	0

The 1904 Marshall Thundering Herd football team represented Marshall College (now Marshall University) as an independent during the 1904 college football season. Marshall posted a 1–3–3 record, being outscored by its opposition 16–26. Home games were played on a campus field called "Central Field" which is presently Campus Commons.

== Schedule ==
Date	Opponent	Site	Result
October 8	Portsmouth HS	Central Field; Huntington, WV	L 0–6
October 15	at Ashland HS	Ashland, KY	T 0–0
October 19	Bethany	Central Field; Huntington, WV	L 5–10
October 22	at Portsmouth HS	Portsmouth, OH	T 0–0
October 29	Charleston HS	Central Field; Huntington, WV	L 0–5
November 12	at Charleston HS	Charleston, WV	T 0–0
November 24	Georgetown (KY)	Central Field; Huntington, WV	W 11–5
