= 1904 Texas A&M Aggies football team =

American college football season

1904 Texas A&M Aggies football
- Conference: Southwestern Intercollegiate Athletic Association
- Record: 4–2 (3–1 SWIAA)
- Head coach: J. E. Platt (3rd season)
- Home stadium: Kyle Field

1904 Southwestern Intercollegiate Athletic Association football standings
	Conf.					Overall
Team	W		L		T	W		L		T
Texas	5	–	0	–	0	6	–	2	–	0
Texas A&M	3	–	1	–	0	4	–	2	–	0
Oklahoma	1	–	1	–	0	4	–	3	–	1
Arkansas	0	–	1	–	0	4	–	3	–	0
Baylor	2	–	5	–	1	2	–	5	–	1
TCU	1	–	3	–	1	1	–	4	–	1
Oklahoma A&M	0	–	1	–	0	0	–	4	–	1
Trinity	0	–	1	–	0	0	–	1	–	0

The 1904 Texas A&M Aggies football team represented the Agricultural and Mechanical College of Texas—now known as Texas A&M University—as member of the Southwestern Intercollegiate Athletic Association during the 1904 college football season. Led by J. E. Platt in his third and final season as head coach, the Aggies compiled an overall record of 4–2.

== Schedule ==
Date	Opponent	Site	Result	Source
October 8	Deaf and Dumb*	Kyle Field; College Station, TX	W 49–0	
October 15	at Baylor	Carroll Field; Waco, TX (rivalry)	W 5–0	
October 22	TCU	Kyle Field; College Station, TX (rivalry)	W 29–0	
November 5	at Baylor	Carroll Field; Waco, TX	W 10–0	
November 10	vs. Sewanee*	Dallas, TX	L 5–17	
November 24	at Texas	Clark Field; Austin, TX (rivalry)	L 6–34	
*Non-conference game
