= 1904 Texas Longhorns football team =

American college football season

1904 Texas Longhorns football
- Conference: Southwestern Intercollegiate Athletic Association
- Record: 6–2 (5–0 SWIAA)
- Head coach: Ralph Hutchinson (2nd season)
- Captain: R. G. Watson
- Home stadium: Varsity Athletic Field

1904 Southwestern Intercollegiate Athletic Association football standings
	Conf.					Overall
Team	W		L		T	W		L		T
Texas	5	–	0	–	0	6	–	2	–	0
Texas A&M	3	–	1	–	0	4	–	2	–	0
Oklahoma	1	–	1	–	0	4	–	3	–	1
Arkansas	0	–	1	–	0	4	–	3	–	0
Baylor	2	–	5	–	1	2	–	5	–	1
TCU	1	–	3	–	1	1	–	4	–	1
Oklahoma A&M	0	–	1	–	0	0	–	4	–	1
Trinity	0	–	1	–	0	0	–	1	–	0

The 1904 Texas Longhorns football team was an American football team that represented the University of Texas (now known as the University of Texas at Austin) as a member of the Southwestern Intercollegiate Athletic Association (SWIAA) during the 1904 college football season. In their second year under head coach Ralph Hutchinson, the Longhorns compiled an overall record of 6–2, with a mark of 5–0 in conference play, and outscored opponents by a collective total of 219 to 88.

== Schedule ==
Date	Time	Opponent	Site	Result	Source
October 8		TCU	Varsity Athletic Field; Austin, TX (rivalry)	W 40–0	
October 15		Trinity (TX)	Varsity Athletic Field; Austin, TX	W 24–0	
October 21		Haskell*	Varsity Athletic Field; Austin, TX	L 0–4	
October 29	3:00 p.m.	at Washington University*	World's Fair Stadium; St. Louis, MO	W 23–0	
November 5		at Chicago*	Marshall Field; Chicago, IL	L 0–68	
November 12		Oklahoma	Varsity Athletic Field; Austin, TX (rivalry)	W 40–10	
November 19		at Baylor	Waco, TX (rivalry)	W 58–0	
November 24		Texas A&M	Varsity Athletic Field; Austin, TX (rivalry)	W 34–6	
*Non-conference game
