= 1904 University of Florida Blue and White football team =

College football season

1904 University of Florida Blue and White football
- Conference: Independent
- Record: 0–5
- Head coach: Marvin O. Bridges (1st season)
- Captain: Bernard Bridges

1904 Southern college football independents records
	Conf.			Overall
Team	W	L	T	W		L		T
Georgetown		–		7	–	1	–	0
Southwest Texas State		–		5	–	1	–	0
Southwestern Louisiana Industrial		–		2	–	0	–	1
Davidson		–		6	–	1	–	1
Navy		–		7	–	2	–	1
North Carolina		–		5	–	2	–	2
Virginia		–		6	–	3	–	0
North Carolina A&M		–		3	–	1	–	2
West Virginia		–		6	–	3	–	0
VPI		–		5	–	3	–	0
George Washington		–		4	–	2	–	2
Arkansas		–		4	–	3	–	0
Oklahoma		–		4	–	3	–	1
South Carolina		–		4	–	3	–	1
Stetson		–		2	–	2	–	0
Central Oklahoma		–		2	–	3	–	0
VMI		–		3	–	5	–	0
Kentucky University		–		3	–	4	–	0
Grant		–		2	–	3	–	0
Florida State College		–		2	–	3	–	0
Maryland		–		2	–	4	–	2
East Florida Seminary		–		1	–	2	–	0
Goldey College		–		1	–	2	–	0
Baylor		–		2	–	5	–	1
Louisiana Industrial		–		1	–	4	–	0
TCU		–		1	–	4	–	1
Delaware		–		1	–	5	–	1
Kendall		–		0	–	2	–	1
Rollins		–		0	–	1	–	0
Tusculum		–		0	–	2	–	0
Birmingham		–		0	–	3	–	0
Florida at Lake City		–		0	–	5	–	0
Oklahoma A&M		–		0	–	6	–	0
Tennessee Docs		–		0	–	7	–	0

The 1904 University of Florida Blue and White football team represented the University of Florida at Lake City in the sport of American football during the 1904 college football season. This was neither the modern University of Florida nor the modern Florida Gators, but a team fielded by one of its four predecessor institutions that had been known as Florida Agricultural College until 1903, being then named the University of Florida until 1905 when the modern university was formed in Gainesville. They were led by player-coach Marvin O. Bridges, whose brothers also played on the squad.

In an attempt to grow the program into one that could compete with those of more established football programs from other southern schools, Bridges arranged a challenging slate of five games that included four out-of-state road contests. The schedule proved too challenging for the Blue and White, who did not score a single point in five lopsided defeats. This would also prove to be the last football team fielded by the school, as the University of Florida at Lake City was merged with three other state-sponsored institutions to form the modern University of Florida in 1905.

== Season overview ==
Football programs were established by a growing number of southern colleges in the 1890s, and a handful of public and private colleges in Florida organized teams in the early years of the 20th century. However, these programs were very informal, and schedules consisting of a few games against other in-state colleges and local athletic clubs in venues that were little more than open fields with spectators standing along the field boundaries.

Coach Bridges sought to grow the school's football program into the first in Florida which could compete with more established programs across the south. In an attempt to expedite the process, he sought and received permission to schedule road games against top out-of-state opponents. The "Blue and White" had never played a game outside of Florida, but Bridges arranged a slate that included daunting road games against Mike Donahue's first Auburn squad and John Heisman's first team at Georgia Tech along with visits to Georgia and Alabama .

The team's five game season was played entirely in October. To reduce travel costs, the Blue and White scheduled its four road games over a two and a half week train trek through Alabama and Georgia. They returned to Lake City in mid-October and concluded the season with their lone home game, a match-up with in-state rival Florida State College on October 21.

Despite Bridge's noble aspirations, the schedule proved far too challenging for the fledgling program, and the Blue and White suffered through a winless season in which they did not score a single point over five games.

== Schedule and game summaries ==
Date	Opponent	Site	Result	Source
October 1	at Alabama	The Quad; Tuscaloosa, AL	L 0–29	
October 4	at Auburn	Auburn, AL	L 0–44	
October 15	at Georgia	Macon, GA	L 0–52	
October 17	at Georgia Tech	Piedmont Park; Atlanta, GA	L 0–77	
October 21	Florida State College	Lake City, FL	L 0–23	

=== Alabama ===
The season opened with a 29–0 loss to Alabama. Touchdowns were scored by William LaFayette Ward (2), Chamberlain, Auxford Burks and Frank Clark.

The starting lineup was: Weller (left end), Buck (left tackle), T. Cason (left guard), Keene (center), Bratton (right guard), T. McGuire (right tackle), B. H. Bridges (right end), McDonnell (quarterback), R. Cason (left halfback), B. T. Bridges (right halfback), C. McGuire (fullback).

=== Auburn ===
The October 4, 1904 game against the University of Florida was considered a practice game by Auburn and is not included in the Tiger's official record of 5–0 for the season.

=== Florida-Georgia dispute ===
The Florida team next traveled to Macon, Georgia to face the Georgia Bulldogs and lost 52–0. The University of Georgia still counts this game as a win against the Florida Gators even though the modern University of Florida did not yet exist, adding another layer of intrigue to the Florida–Georgia football rivalry. UGA sports historian Dan Magill sums up Georgia's attitude: "That's where Florida was back then. We can't help it if they got run out of Lake City."

=== Georgia Tech ===
Team	1	2	Total
Florida	0	0	0
• Ga. Tech	36	41	77

- Location: Atlanta, GA

Only a single first down was scored on Tech, a 77–0 loss. The starting lineup was: Zealius (left end), Bratton (left tackle), T. McGuire (left guard), Keene (center), O'Berry (right guard), Rowlett (right tackle), R. Woller (right end), R. Cason (quarterback), Clarke (left halfback), Bridges (right halfback), C. McGuire (fullback)

=== Florida State College ===
The Blue and White had reason for optimism coming into their last game of the season against the Florida State College Eleven (FSC). They were finally playing a home game, they had beaten FSC in Lake City in 1902, and FSC had been beaten soundly by Georgia Tech in the only game they'd played of their 1904 slate. This was not first meeting between FSC's player-coach Jack Forsythe and Marvin Bridges, his counterpart for the Blue and White; Forsythe was a player on the Clemson Tigers team that tied Bridges' Cumberland Bulldogs in a 1903 battle which was dubbed the SIAA championship game.

Their 1904 match-up was not nearly as close; the Blue and White were shut out again and lost 23–0. As a newspaper account reported, "The people of Lake City had expected at least one victory after a long series of defeats encountered by the university and were greatly disappointed. The university should be made stronger before it attempts to play again." FSC would go on to beat Stetson and lay claim to a "state championship".

== Aftermath ==
The 1904 campaign would be the school's last, as the University of Florida in Lake City ceased to exist after the 1904-1905 academic year. Per the Buckman Act of 1905, the Florida legislature consolidated the school with three other state-supported institutions to establish the modern University of Florida in Gainesville. When the new university fielded its first football team in 1906, no players or coaches from the 1904 Blue and White squad were associated with the program.
