= Edwin F. Gayle =

American football player, coach, and lawyer (1875–1976)

Biographical details
- Born: August 18, 1875; Pointe Coupee Parish, Louisiana, U.S.
- Died: May 11, 1976 (aged 100); Lake Charles, Louisiana, U.S.
- Education: Tulane (1906, LLB)

Playing career
- 1893: LSU
- Position: Halfback

Coaching career (HC unless noted)
- 1904: Southwestern Louisiana

Head coaching record
- Overall: 2–0–1

Edwin Franklin Gayle (August 18, 1875 – May 11, 1976) was an American lawyer and college football player and coach. He served as the head football coach at the University of Louisiana at Lafayette–then known as the Southwestern Louisiana Institute–in 1904.

Gayle was an 1896 graduate of Louisiana State University (LSU). He later earned a master's degree from Columbia University in 1903 and a law degree from the Tulane University Law School in 1906.

== Head coaching record ==
Year	Team	Overall	Conference	Standing	Bowl/playoffs
Southwestern Louisiana Industrial (Independent) (1904)
1904	Southwestern Louisiana Industrial	2–0–1			
Southwestern Louisiana Industrial:		2–0–1			
Total:		2–0–1			
