= 1904 Tampa football team =

American college football season

1904 Tampa football
- Conference: Independent
- Record: 1–1
- Captain: Bert Steadman

The 1904 Tampa football team was an amateur American football team based in Tampa, Florida which competed during the 1904 college football season. The Tampa Football club should not be confused with the University of Tampa's football program, as the school was not established until 1933.

The Tampa team was active for several years in the early 1900s and competed against early college football squads along with amateur teams organized by military bases and other local clubs from around Florida. The club's founder and manager, local businessman J. L. Reed, was considered instrumental in bringing the game of football to Tampa.

The team's lineup against Jacksonville was: Bagwell (left end), Barclay (left tackle), Woolweaver (left guard), Pemberton (center), Hodgson (right guard), Emory (right tackle), Letz (right end), C. Joughin (quarterback), R. Joughin (left halfback), Kissinger (right halfback), Steadman (fullback).

== Schedule ==
Date	Opponent	Site	Result	Source
October 16	at Jacksonville Jays	Jacksonville, FL	L 0–15	
November 18	East Florida Seminary	DeSoto Park; Tampa, FL	W 11–6	
