= 1904 East Florida Seminary football team =

American college football season

1904 East Florida Seminary football
- Conference: Independent
- Record: 1–3
- Home stadium: The Ballpark

1904 Southern college football independents records
	Conf.			Overall
Team	W	L	T	W		L		T
Georgetown		–		7	–	1	–	0
Southwest Texas State		–		5	–	1	–	0
Southwestern Louisiana Industrial		–		2	–	0	–	1
Davidson		–		6	–	1	–	1
Navy		–		7	–	2	–	1
North Carolina		–		5	–	2	–	2
Virginia		–		6	–	3	–	0
North Carolina A&M		–		3	–	1	–	2
West Virginia		–		6	–	3	–	0
VPI		–		5	–	3	–	0
George Washington		–		4	–	2	–	2
Arkansas		–		4	–	3	–	0
Oklahoma		–		4	–	3	–	1
South Carolina		–		4	–	3	–	1
Stetson		–		2	–	2	–	0
Central Oklahoma		–		2	–	3	–	0
VMI		–		3	–	5	–	0
Kentucky University		–		3	–	4	–	0
Grant		–		2	–	3	–	0
Florida State College		–		2	–	3	–	0
Maryland		–		2	–	4	–	2
East Florida Seminary		–		1	–	2	–	0
Goldey College		–		1	–	2	–	0
Baylor		–		2	–	5	–	1
Louisiana Industrial		–		1	–	4	–	0
TCU		–		1	–	4	–	1
Delaware		–		1	–	5	–	1
Kendall		–		0	–	2	–	1
Rollins		–		0	–	1	–	0
Tusculum		–		0	–	2	–	0
Birmingham		–		0	–	3	–	0
Florida at Lake City		–		0	–	5	–	0
Oklahoma A&M		–		0	–	6	–	0
Tennessee Docs		–		0	–	7	–	0

The 1904 East Florida Seminary football team represented the East Florida Seminary in the sport of American football during the 1904 college football season. Though the school was located in Gainesville, Florida, it was not the modern University of Florida but one of its predecessor institutions. Intercollegiate football was not as a well-established sport in Florida at the time, so seasons typically consisted of a few games against in-state schools or athletic clubs. East Florida Seminary's team played three games in 1904 - home-and-home losses against the Stetson Hatters along with a road victory over the Cadets of the South Florida Military College in what may have been the first organized football game played in Polk County.

The 1904-1905 academic year was the last for the school. The Florida legislature reorganized the state's system of higher education the following year, and the East Florida Seminary was consolidated along with four other state-supported institutions to form the new "University of the State of Florida", which established its own football program in 1906.

== Schedule ==
Date	Opponent	Site	Result	Source
	Stetson		L 0–16	
	Stetson		L 0–21	
November 18	at Tampa	DeSoto Park; Tampa, FL	L 6–11	
November 19	at South Florida Military College	Bartow, FL	W 26–0	
