= John C. O'Connor =

American football player, coach, and physician (1878–1922)

Biographical details
- Born: December 21, 1878; Bradford, Massachusetts, U.S.
- Died: January 5, 1922 (aged 43); Manchester, New Hampshire, U.S.

Playing career
- 1898–1901: Dartmouth

Coaching career (HC unless noted)
- 1902–1903: Bowdoin
- 1904: VPI
- 1907–1908: Dartmouth

Head coaching record
- Overall: 26–14–2

John Christopher O'Connor (December 21, 1878 – January 5, 1922) was an American college football player, coach, and physician. He served as the head football coach at Bowdoin College from 1902 to 1903, at Virginia Agricultural and Mechanical College and Polytechnic Institute (VPI)—now known as Virginia Tech—in 1904, and at Dartmouth College from 1907 to 1908, compiling a career coaching record of 26–14–2. O'Connor played football at Dartmouth from 1898 to 1901, and captained the team in 1901.

O'Connor was born in Bradford, Massachusetts on December 21, 1878. He graduated from Haverhill High School in 1898, Dartmouth College in 1902, and the Bowdoin Medical School in 1905. O'Connor served on the staff of the Eliot and Balch hospitals in Manchester, New Hampshire. He died there on January 5, 1922.

== Head coaching record ==
Year	Team	Overall	Conference	Standing	Bowl/playoffs
Bowdoin Polar Bears (Independent) (1902–1903)
1902	Bowdoin	3–5			
1903	Bowdoin	4–5			
Bowdoin:		7–10			
VPI (Independent) (1904)
1904	VPI	5–3			
VPI:		5–3			
Dartmouth (Independent) (1907–1908)
1907	Dartmouth	8–0–1			
1908	Dartmouth	6–1–1			
Dartmouth:		14–1–2			
Total:		26–14–2			
