= Fred Ewing =

American football coach and physician (1880–1968)

Biographical details
- Born: October 23, 1880; Arcola, Illinois, U.S.
- Died: March 2, 1968 (aged 87); Saratoga, California, U.S.

Playing career
- 1902: Knox (IL)
- Position: Tackle

Coaching career (HC unless noted)
- 1903: Fargo
- 1904: Oklahoma
- 1905: Knox (IL)

Head coaching record
- Overall: 8–9–2

Fred E. "Buck" Ewing (October 23, 1880 – March 2, 1968) was an American football coach and physician. He coached the University of Oklahoma during the 1904 season and amassed a 4–3–1 record. He was the first Oklahoma football coach to require players to be academically eligible. Ewing coached Oklahoma in its first meeting against Oklahoma State University.

== Early life ==
A native of Arcola, Illinois, Ewing attended Knox College in Galesburg. He played on the football there, including as its captain during the 1902 season, and was considered the greatest tackle the school ever produced. That year, Knox defeated several larger schools, including Notre Dame, Kansas, and Northwestern. Ewing was elected the president of the Inter-State Oratorical Society and president of the graduating class of 1903. He was also a member of the Phi Delta Theta fraternity. After college, Ewing attended medical school at the Rush Medical College in Chicago.

== Coaching career ==
His coaching career began in 1903 at Fargo College in Fargo, North Dakota.

In 1904, Ewing took a hiatus from medical school to become the fifth head coach of the University of Oklahoma football team. He was the first coach at the school to insist upon fielding only academically eligible players, and the first Oklahoma coach to not play on the team himself. Ewing also introduced to Oklahoma the practice of ankle-taping and the "Minnesota shift", a maneuver attributed to Golden Gophers coach Henry L. Williams.

The Oklahoma Rough Riders (as they were then known) played Kingfisher College to a scoreless stalemate in the season opener. At their next opponent, the Pauls Valley Town Team, the Oklahoma players helped erect the goalposts and chalk lines on the field, which was only 75 yards in length. The game started late, at 5:00 pm, and the second half was shortened from 20 to 10 minutes, which made it the shortest game in school history. Oklahoma lost to Kansas, 16–0, the following week at Oklahoma City. The Rough Riders defeated Lawton on the road, 6–0.

On November 5, Oklahoma and rival Oklahoma A&M (now Oklahoma State) played their first game, which was held halfway between Norman and Stillwater in Guthrie, Oklahoma. After the Aggies failed to advance the ball in the game's first possession, they elected to punt it away. The ball sailed out of bounds behind the punter and through the A&M end zone before bouncing into a creek. By the rules of the day, possession would be gained by the team that recovered the loose ball first. Several A&M and Oklahoma players jumped into the creek and struggled to control the wet ball before the Rough Riders finally came up with it and downed it on the bank for the first touchdown of the game. During the game, every Oklahoma player scored in a rout of Oklahoma A&M, which ended with the final score of 75–0.

The next week featured an early edition of what became another long-standing Oklahoma rivalry, that against Texas. Texas led 17–10 at half time, but scored 33 unanswered points in the second period to win 50–10. In their next game, undefeated Bethany College continued its streak and, using a hurry-up offense, defeated Oklahoma, 36–9, on Thanksgiving day. Oklahoma finished the season with a 4–3–1 record. The following day, Ewing traveled back to Chicago to continue medical school.

In 1905, Ewing signed a two-year contract to coach at his alma mater, Knox College, and continued his medical schooling at Rush between the football seasons.

== Later life ==
In 1912, Ewing moved back to Galesburg to work as a surgeon. He later moved to North Dakota, where he built a hospital and became the youngest president of the state medical society. Ewing lived in Oakland, California in the late 1930s and 1940s, and was an active member of the Kiwanis Club. In 1940, Ewing spoke at a Berkeley, California YMCA, and said attributes required of championship athletes included the "ability to rise to great heights in emergencies". Ewing was a lay leader of the Trinity Church. During the defense of the Philippines in World War II, Ewing addressed the Berkeley Kiwanis Club:

"We need tough men today ... We cannot expect 100 per cent unity. There were Tories in the Revolutionary War, copperheads in the Civil War and slackers in the last war. But we can hope for that hardy leadership that characterizes our fight for freedom, our pioneering movements, our activities in World War I—yes, even the days of '49."

Ewing died in 1968 at the age of about 82 years.

== Head coaching record ==
Year	Team	Overall	Bowl/playoffs
Fargo Hilltoppers (Independent) (1903)
1903	Fargo		
Fargo:			
Oklahoma Sooners (Independent) (1904)
1904	Oklahoma	4–3–1	
Oklahoma:		4–3–1	
Knox Old Siwash (Independent) (1905)
1905	Knox	4–6–1	
Knox:		4–6–1	
Total:		8–9–2	
