= 1904 Rollins Tars football team =

American college football season

1904 Rollins Tars football
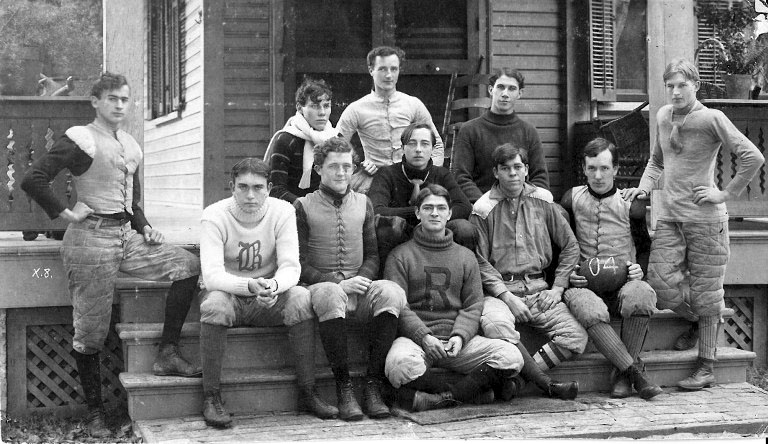
- Conference: Independent
- Record: 0–1

1904 Southern college football independents records
| | Conf. | | | Overall |
| Team | W | L | T | W | | L | | T |
|---|---|---|---|---|---|---|---|---|
| Georgetown | | – | | 7 | – | 1 | – | 0 |
| Southwest Texas State | | – | | 5 | – | 1 | – | 0 |
| Southwestern Louisiana Industrial | | – | | 2 | – | 0 | – | 1 |
| Davidson | | – | | 6 | – | 1 | – | 1 |
| Navy | | – | | 7 | – | 2 | – | 1 |
| North Carolina | | – | | 5 | – | 2 | – | 2 |
| Virginia | | – | | 6 | – | 3 | – | 0 |
| North Carolina A&M | | – | | 3 | – | 1 | – | 2 |
| West Virginia | | – | | 6 | – | 3 | – | 0 |
| VPI | | – | | 5 | – | 3 | – | 0 |
| George Washington | | – | | 4 | – | 2 | – | 2 |
| Arkansas | | – | | 4 | – | 3 | – | 0 |
| Oklahoma | | – | | 4 | – | 3 | – | 1 |
| South Carolina | | – | | 4 | – | 3 | – | 1 |
| Stetson | | – | | 2 | – | 2 | – | 0 |
| Central Oklahoma | | – | | 2 | – | 3 | – | 0 |
| VMI | | – | | 3 | – | 5 | – | 0 |
| Kentucky University | | – | | 3 | – | 4 | – | 0 |
| Grant | | – | | 2 | – | 3 | – | 0 |
| Florida State College | | – | | 2 | – | 3 | – | 0 |
| Maryland | | – | | 2 | – | 4 | – | 2 |
| East Florida Seminary | | – | | 1 | – | 2 | – | 0 |
| Goldey College | | – | | 1 | – | 2 | – | 0 |
| Baylor | | – | | 2 | – | 5 | – | 1 |
| Louisiana Industrial | | – | | 1 | – | 4 | – | 0 |
| TCU | | – | | 1 | – | 4 | – | 1 |
| Delaware | | – | | 1 | – | 5 | – | 1 |
| Kendall | | – | | 0 | – | 2 | – | 1 |
| Rollins | | – | | 0 | – | 1 | – | 0 |
| Tusculum | | – | | 0 | – | 2 | – | 0 |
| Birmingham | | – | | 0 | – | 3 | – | 0 |
| Florida at Lake City | | – | | 0 | – | 5 | – | 0 |
| Oklahoma A&M | | – | | 0 | – | 6 | – | 0 |
| Tennessee Docs | | – | | 0 | – | 7 | – | 0 |

The 1904 Rollins Tars football team represented Rollins College in the sport of American football as an independent during the 1904 college football season.

== Schedule ==
| Opponent | Site | Result |
|---|---|---|
| South Florida Military College | | L 0–5 |
