= 1904 Florida State College football team =

American college football season

1904 Florida State College football
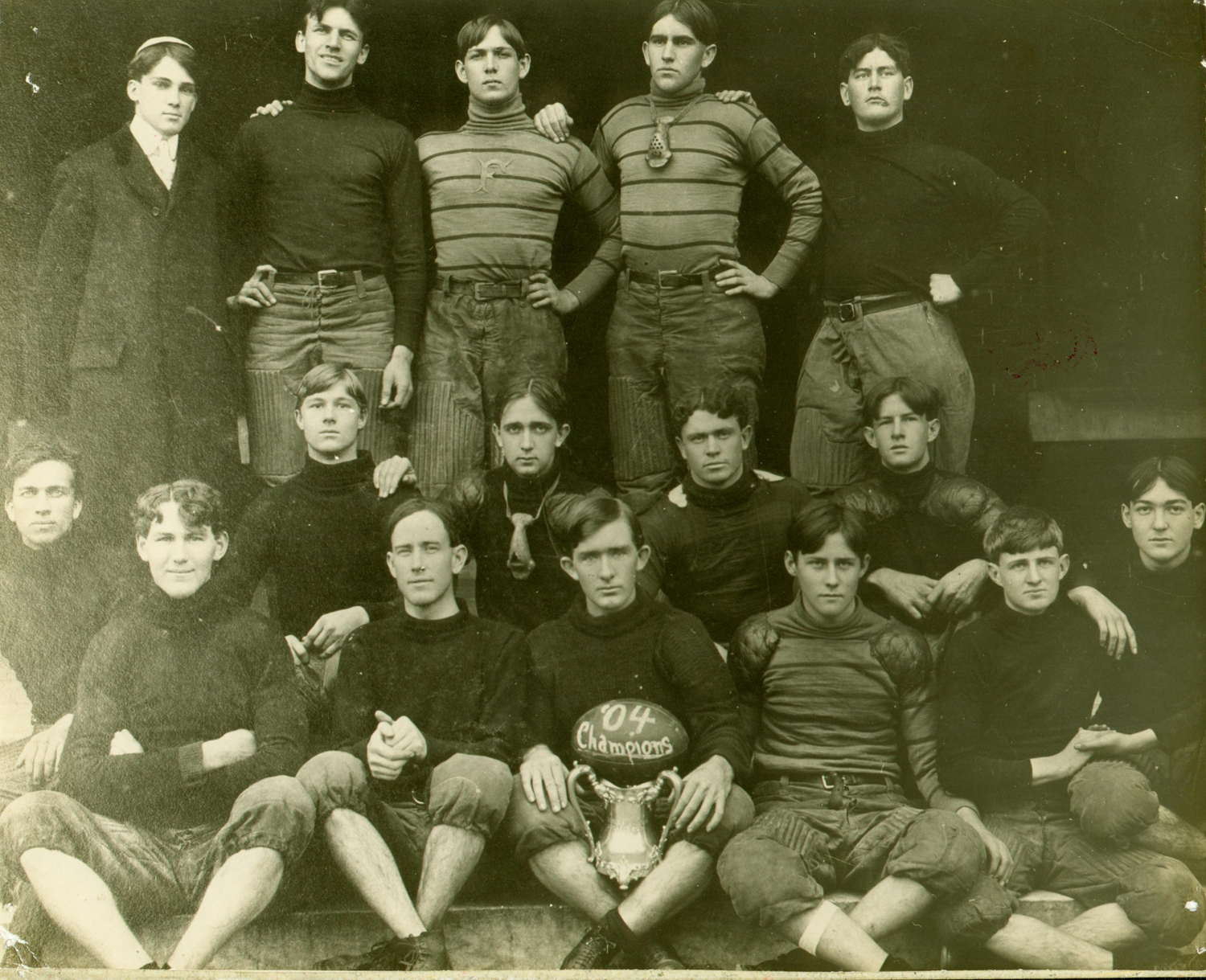

State champion
- Conference: Independent
- Record: 2–3
- Head coach: Jack Forsythe (1st season)
- Captain: Dan Williams

1904 Southern college football independents records
	Conf.			Overall
Team	W	L	T	W		L		T
Georgetown		–		7	–	1	–	0
Southwest Texas State		–		5	–	1	–	0
Southwestern Louisiana Industrial		–		2	–	0	–	1
Davidson		–		6	–	1	–	1
Navy		–		7	–	2	–	1
North Carolina		–		5	–	2	–	2
Virginia		–		6	–	3	–	0
North Carolina A&M		–		3	–	1	–	2
West Virginia		–		6	–	3	–	0
VPI		–		5	–	3	–	0
George Washington		–		4	–	2	–	2
Arkansas		–		4	–	3	–	0
Oklahoma		–		4	–	3	–	1
South Carolina		–		4	–	3	–	1
Stetson		–		2	–	2	–	0
Central Oklahoma		–		2	–	3	–	0
VMI		–		3	–	5	–	0
Kentucky University		–		3	–	4	–	0
Grant		–		2	–	3	–	0
Florida State College		–		2	–	3	–	0
Maryland		–		2	–	4	–	2
East Florida Seminary		–		1	–	2	–	0
Goldey College		–		1	–	2	–	0
Baylor		–		2	–	5	–	1
Louisiana Industrial		–		1	–	4	–	0
TCU		–		1	–	4	–	1
Delaware		–		1	–	5	–	1
Kendall		–		0	–	2	–	1
Rollins		–		0	–	1	–	0
Tusculum		–		0	–	2	–	0
Birmingham		–		0	–	3	–	0
Florida at Lake City		–		0	–	5	–	0
Oklahoma A&M		–		0	–	6	–	0
Tennessee Docs		–		0	–	7	–	0

The 1904 Florida State College football team represented Florida State College (FSC) in the sport of American football during the 1904 college football season. The team, led by head coach Jack Forsythe, posted a 2–3 record and won the State Championship with victories over Stetson and the University of Florida at Lake City With no formal nickname or mascot, the Florida State College football team was known simply as the "Florida State College Eleven".

This would be the last football squad fielded by Florida State College, which was converted into the Florida State College for Women when the state's system of higher education was reorganized by the Buckman Act. Jack Forsythe became the first football coach for the new University of the State of Florida when it opened in Gainesville in 1906. After World War 2, Florida State College became the co-educational Florida State University, which traces the roots of its football program back to the teams of Florida State College.

== Before the season ==
=== Uniforms ===
The Florida State College Eleven wore gold uniforms with a large purple F on the front.

== Schedule ==
Date	Opponent	Site	Result
October 8	at Georgia Tech	Piedmont Park; Atlanta, GA	L 0–35
October 21	University of Florida at Lake City	Lake City, FL	W 23–0
October 29	at Savannah A. A.	Savannah, GA	L 0–6
November 5	at Jacksonville Consolidated	Jacksonville, FL	L 0–6
November 24	Stetson	Tallahassee, FL	W 18–6

== Season summary ==
=== Week 1: Georgia Tech ===
The season opened with a 35–0 defeat at the hands of coach John Heisman's Georgia Tech team. At the start of the contest, Georgia Tech tried line bucking to no avail. Then a run off tackle by Tech's fullback Clarke went 70 yards for a touchdown. Lob Brown and Davies played well.

The starting lineup for Florida State was: Johnston (left end), Liddell (left tackle), Mullin (left guard), Williams (center), Buckholz (right guard), McCord (right tackle), Pulliston (right end), Murray (quarterback), Watson (left halfback), Wells (right halfback), and Walther (fullback).

=== Week 2: Florida ===
Florida State scored a touchdown in a "hotly contested" first half, and three more in the second half. Time of game: First half, 25 minutes; second half, 20 minutes.

=== Week 3: Savannah Athletic Association ===
In 1904, the Atlanta Constitution wrote that Savannah Athletic Association was "considered one of the strongest in the South".

=== Week 4: Jacksonville Consolidated ===
The first half was played without either team scoring. Florida State started the game with a fumble by Liddell on kickoff and was held where he caught it. Florida State was driving towards Jacksonville's goal, when Jacksonville recovered the ball on a Florida State fumble. Florida State got the ball back, thanks to a fumble by Yancey. On the thirty-yard line, Jacksonville's Jones tackled a Florida State player and forced a fumble, which Florida State lost. After Jacksonville gained yardage, an effort to send the ball around the left end of Florida State resulted in a loss of ten yards. Yancey again lost several yards, but by a technicality kept possession of the ball instead of a turnover on downs. Yancey, Jones and Kennedy then commenced a rapid advance of the ball by a series of fierce bucks. The first half ended with the ball in Jacksonville's territory.

In the second half, there was a decided improvement by Jacksonville and an apparently falling off in the defensive work of Florida State. Jacksonville was getting into weak points of Florida State and managed to advance a little more rapidly.

Jones was standing on Jacksonville's fifteen-yard line when Florida State kicked off and he caught the ball. A dash through center for a fake run was followed by a sudden dart through right tackle, catching the opposing team almost unaware. Good interference from Curran and others, and a clever direction of his route by Kennedy assisted Jones in making the touchdown. Jones caught the ball fair, and his run was "as fleet as that of a deer". When he started out, Florida State expected him to break through center, as he was making rapid strides in that direction, Florida State bunched for the center and left the ends practically unprotected. Once around the center of the Florida State line and between tackle and right end, Jones had almost clear sailing. There were but two efforts to tackle him but they were successfully met. Jones jumped one of the tackles and Curran guarded him against the second. The Florida State and Jacksonville players raced with Jones for the goal, but were unable to catch him. "Those who had been waving aloft the Jacksonville colors went wild with enthusiasm, and there was a din which lasted until Yancey had succeeded in kicking the goal."

After the touchdown by Jones, the ball was returned to the center and Jacksonville kicked off to Florida State. The ball was caught by Puleston, who carried it from the 16-yard line to the 30-yard line. Florida State again made attacked Jacksonville's defensive line, gaining fifteen yards when again Florida State lost the ball on a fumble. Jacksonville had possession and moved down the field. Florida State's defense was able to hold Jacksonville back, though they were unable to get the ball on downs. There were a number of controversial calls in this part of the game, as to whether the line of scrimmage had been properly marked, but Jacksonville managed to retain the ball until within twenty yards of the goal line, when it was fumbled. Florida State recovered the ball, but lost it on downs before gaining much yardage. There were then three minutes on the play clock, and the Jacksonville made a vigorous effort to score, failing to do so in only about four yards.

== End of the program ==
In 1905, Florida's state legislature passed the Buckman Act, which completely reorganized the state's system of higher education and consolidated most state colleges and universities into a few new institutions. Florida State College ceased to exist, and its Tallahassee campus became home to the new Florida Female College (later changed to the Florida State College for Women), ending the football program. After a year of transition, the new "University of the State of Florida" opened in Gainesville in 1906, and Jack Forsythe, FSC's last head coach, was hired as UF's first head coach.

== Roster ==
The original lineup played the entire game, both offense and defense. Substitutes replaced injured players.

=== Line ===
- LE - J.K. Johnston
- LT – Liddell
- LG – David Munro Cook
- C – Dan Williams
- RG – Buchholz
- RT – Guyte McCord
- RE - Puleston

=== Backfield ===
- QB – Murray
- LH - Forsyth
- RH - Watson
- FB – Whitner
