= Jack Forsythe =

American football player and coach (1882–1957)

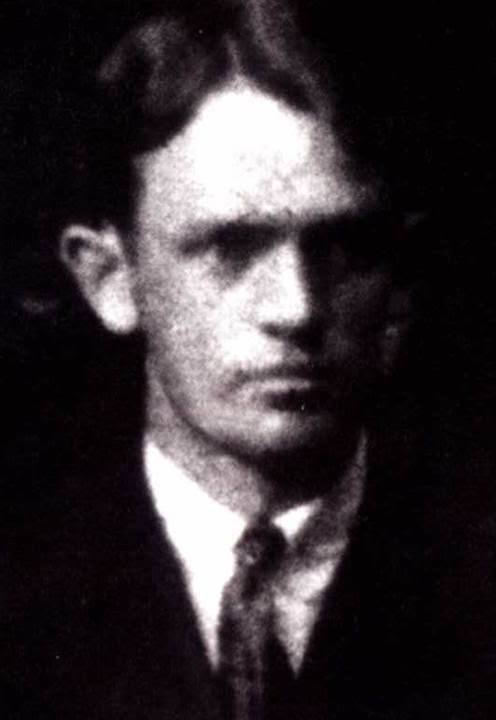
- Forsythe cropped from Florida's 1907 team picture

Biographical details
- Born: August 4, 1882; Brevard, North Carolina, U.S.
- Died: April 3, 1957 (aged 74); Charlotte, North Carolina, U.S.

Playing career
- 1901–1903: Clemson
- 1904: Florida State College
- 1906–1908: Florida
- Positions: Guard, fullback, end

Coaching career (HC unless noted)
- 1904: Florida State College
- 1906–1908: Florida

Head coaching record
- Overall: 14–6–2

James Adger "Jack" Forsythe Jr. (August 4, 1882 – April 3, 1957), nicknamed "Pee Wee", was an American college football player and coach. Forsythe has an important place in the history of college athletics in the U.S. state of Florida as the first head coach of the team now known as the University of Florida Gators. He had previously been the last football coach at Florida State College, now Florida State University, before it was reorganized as a school for women.

== Early years ==
Forsythe was born in Brevard, North Carolina. He claimed to have been at the first instance of the "Big Thursday" Clemson–South Carolina rivalry in Columbia, South Carolina in 1896.

== College playing career ==
Forsythe was a standout football player at right guard for Clemson Agricultural College (now Clemson University) in Clemson, South Carolina, playing for three years under coach John Heisman, from 1901 to 1903. Heisman's Clemson Tigers football teams finished 3–1–1, 6–1 and 4–1–1 during those seasons, claiming southern championships in the latter two, and Forsythe started in each of those games. Moreover, he played every minute of those eighteen games, providing a remarkable example of athletic stamina and resilience. As was typical in the early 1900s, Forsythe played both offense and defense. Teammates on the line included Vet Sitton, Hope Sadler, and O. L. Derrick.

== Coaching career ==
Forsythe became an assistant coach for the fledgling football team of Florida State College (now Florida State University) in 1903. Florida State College's head coach, W. W. Hughes, planned to use Forsythe as a fullback in a game against the University of Florida in Lake City (one of the predecessor institutions of the modern University of Florida, previously known as Florida Agricultural College), creating a controversy between the teams. For the 1904 season, the third and last for FSC's football team, Hughes transferred all coaching duties to Forsythe. The reason for this is unknown, but Hughes, who was also a Latin professor, may have taken on increased academic duties. Forsythe played on top of his coaching duties, and was probably paid. Under Forsythe, the FSC football team defeated the University of Florida at Lake City, and after defeating Stetson College (now Stetson University), FSC was declared "champion of Florida" by The Florida Times-Union newspaper of Jacksonville.

In 1905 the Florida Legislature passed the Buckman Act, which reorganized higher education in Florida. The University of Florida in Lake City was merged with three other institutions to form the new "University of the State of Florida", a school for men in Gainesville. Florida State College became the Florida Female College, a school for women, and a number of its former male students transferred to the new men's university. With the ending of FSC's football program, Forsythe coached the University School for Boys prep team in Stone Mountain, Georgia for a year.

The University of the State of Florida opened in Gainesville in 1906, and in May, Forsythe was hired to be the school's first football coach and director of athletics. Forsythe coached at Florida for three seasons from 1906 to 1908, and he compiled a 14–6–2 overall win–loss record. As measured by his winning percentage (.682), he is currently the eighth winningest football coach in team history. In addition to his coaching duties for which he was paid $500, Forsythe also played on the team as a fullback and was purportedly paid an additional $500. Forsythe's most successful season at Florida came in 1907, when the Orange and Blue posted a 4–1–1 record behind star back William Shands, who later was elected as a state senator and helped found the University of Florida College of Medicine.

== Head coaching record ==
Year	Team	Overall	Conference	Standing	Bowl/playoffs
Florida State College (Independent) (1904)
1904	Florida State College	2–3			
Florida State College:		2–3			
Florida (Independent) (1906–1908)
1906	Florida	5–3			
1907	Florida	4–1–1			
1908	Florida	5–2–1			
Florida:		14–6–2			
Total:		16–9–2			

== See also ==
- History of Florida State University
- History of the University of Florida
- List of Clemson University alumni
