= 1904 Kentucky University football team =

American college football season

1904 Kentucky University football
- Conference: Independent
- Record: 3–4
- Home stadium: K.U. Athletic Park

1904 Southern college football independents records
	Conf.			Overall
Team	W	L	T	W		L		T
Georgetown		–		7	–	1	–	0
Southwest Texas State		–		5	–	1	–	0
Southwestern Louisiana Industrial		–		2	–	0	–	1
Davidson		–		6	–	1	–	1
Navy		–		7	–	2	–	1
North Carolina		–		5	–	2	–	2
Virginia		–		6	–	3	–	0
North Carolina A&M		–		3	–	1	–	2
West Virginia		–		6	–	3	–	0
VPI		–		5	–	3	–	0
George Washington		–		4	–	2	–	2
Arkansas		–		4	–	3	–	0
Oklahoma		–		4	–	3	–	1
South Carolina		–		4	–	3	–	1
Stetson		–		2	–	2	–	0
Central Oklahoma		–		2	–	3	–	0
VMI		–		3	–	5	–	0
Kentucky University		–		3	–	4	–	0
Grant		–		2	–	3	–	0
Florida State College		–		2	–	3	–	0
Maryland		–		2	–	4	–	2
East Florida Seminary		–		1	–	2	–	0
Goldey College		–		1	–	2	–	0
Baylor		–		2	–	5	–	1
Louisiana Industrial		–		1	–	4	–	0
TCU		–		1	–	4	–	1
Delaware		–		1	–	5	–	1
Kendall		–		0	–	2	–	1
Rollins		–		0	–	1	–	0
Tusculum		–		0	–	2	–	0
Birmingham		–		0	–	3	–	0
Florida at Lake City		–		0	–	5	–	0
Oklahoma A&M		–		0	–	6	–	0
Tennessee Docs		–		0	–	7	–	0

The 1904 Kentucky University football team was an American football team that represented Kentucky University (now known as Transylvania University) as an independent during the 1904 college football season.

== Schedule ==
Date	Time	Opponent	Site	Result	Attendance	Source
September 24		Kentucky Military Institute	K.U. Athletic Park; Lexington, KY	W 12–0		
October 15		Central University	K.U. Athletic Park; Lexington, KY	W 42–0		
October 20	2:30 p.m.	at Saint Louis	World's Fair Stadium; St. Louis, MO	L 0–5		
October 22		at Missouri	Rollins Field; Columbia, MO	L 6–37	1,100	
November 12		at Central University	Danville, KY	W 39–0		
November 18		at Indiana	Jordan Field; Bloomington, IN	L 0–27		
November 24		at Kentucky State College	State College Park; Lexington, KY (rivalry)	L 4–22	4,000	
