= 1904 Kendall Orange and Black football team =

American college football season

1904 Kendall Orange and Black football
- Conference: Independent
- Record: 0–2–1
- Head coach: S. L. Morley (1st season)
- Captain: Robertson
- Home stadium: Athletic Park

1904 Southern college football independents records
	Conf.			Overall
Team	W	L	T	W		L		T
Georgetown		–		7	–	1	–	0
Southwest Texas State		–		5	–	1	–	0
Southwestern Louisiana Industrial		–		2	–	0	–	1
Davidson		–		6	–	1	–	1
Navy		–		7	–	2	–	1
North Carolina		–		5	–	2	–	2
Virginia		–		6	–	3	–	0
North Carolina A&M		–		3	–	1	–	2
West Virginia		–		6	–	3	–	0
VPI		–		5	–	3	–	0
George Washington		–		4	–	2	–	2
Arkansas		–		4	–	3	–	0
Oklahoma		–		4	–	3	–	1
South Carolina		–		4	–	3	–	1
Stetson		–		2	–	2	–	0
Central Oklahoma		–		2	–	3	–	0
VMI		–		3	–	5	–	0
Kentucky University		–		3	–	4	–	0
Grant		–		2	–	3	–	0
Florida State College		–		2	–	3	–	0
Maryland		–		2	–	4	–	2
East Florida Seminary		–		1	–	2	–	0
Goldey College		–		1	–	2	–	0
Baylor		–		2	–	5	–	1
Louisiana Industrial		–		1	–	4	–	0
TCU		–		1	–	4	–	1
Delaware		–		1	–	5	–	1
Kendall		–		0	–	2	–	1
Rollins		–		0	–	1	–	0
Tusculum		–		0	–	2	–	0
Birmingham		–		0	–	3	–	0
Florida at Lake City		–		0	–	5	–	0
Oklahoma A&M		–		0	–	6	–	0
Tennessee Docs		–		0	–	7	–	0

The 1904 Kendall Orange and Black football team represented Henry Kendall College—now known as the University of Tulsa—as an independent during the 1904 college football season. Led by S. L. Morley in his first and only season as head coach, the team compiled a record of 0–2–1.

== Schedule ==
Date	Time	Opponent	Site	Result	Source
November 4		Willie Halsell College	Muskogee, Indian Territory	T 0–0	
November 11	3:30 p.m.	at Jones Academy	Krebs Park; Krebs, Indian Territory	L 0–17	
November 24	3:00 p.m.	Jones Academy	Athletic Park; Muskogee, Indian Territory	L 0–6	
All times are in Central time
