= 1904 South Carolina Gamecocks football team =

American college football season

1904 South Carolina Gamecocks football
- Conference: Independent
- Record: 4–3–1
- Head coach: Christie Benet (1st season)
- Captain: Gene Oliver

1904 Southern college football independents records
	Conf.			Overall
Team	W	L	T	W		L		T
Georgetown		–		7	–	1	–	0
Southwest Texas State		–		5	–	1	–	0
Southwestern Louisiana Industrial		–		2	–	0	–	1
Davidson		–		6	–	1	–	1
Navy		–		7	–	2	–	1
North Carolina		–		5	–	2	–	2
Virginia		–		6	–	3	–	0
North Carolina A&M		–		3	–	1	–	2
West Virginia		–		6	–	3	–	0
VPI		–		5	–	3	–	0
George Washington		–		4	–	2	–	2
Arkansas		–		4	–	3	–	0
Oklahoma		–		4	–	3	–	1
South Carolina		–		4	–	3	–	1
Stetson		–		2	–	2	–	0
Central Oklahoma		–		2	–	3	–	0
VMI		–		3	–	5	–	0
Kentucky University		–		3	–	4	–	0
Grant		–		2	–	3	–	0
Florida State College		–		2	–	3	–	0
Maryland		–		2	–	4	–	2
East Florida Seminary		–		1	–	2	–	0
Goldey College		–		1	–	2	–	0
Baylor		–		2	–	5	–	1
Louisiana Industrial		–		1	–	4	–	0
TCU		–		1	–	4	–	1
Delaware		–		1	–	5	–	1
Kendall		–		0	–	2	–	1
Rollins		–		0	–	1	–	0
Tusculum		–		0	–	2	–	0
Birmingham		–		0	–	3	–	0
Florida at Lake City		–		0	–	5	–	0
Oklahoma A&M		–		0	–	6	–	0
Tennessee Docs		–		0	–	7	–	0

The 1904 South Carolina Gamecocks football team represented South Carolina College—now known as the University of South Carolina–as an independent during the 1904 college football season. Led by first-year head coach Christie Benet, South Carolina compiled a record of 4–3–1. Captain Gene Oliver played against Georgia with a broken jaw.

== Schedule ==
Date	Opponent	Site	Result	Source
October 7	Welsh Neck High School	Columbia, SC	W 40–0	
October 15	at North Carolina	Chapel Hill, NC	L 0–27	
October 20	Guilford	Columbia, SC	W 21–4	
October 26	Georgia	Columbia, SC	W 2–0	
November 5	at North Carolina A&M	Raleigh, NC	T 0–0	
November 12	Davidson	Columbia, SC	L 0–6	
November 19	at Charleston A.C.	Charleston, SC	L 0–6	
November 24	Washington and Lee	Sumter, SC	W 25–0	
