= 1904 VPI football team =

American college football season

1904 VPI football
- Conference: Independent
- Record: 5–3
- Head coach: John C. O'Connor (1st season)
- Captain: George C. Willson
- Home stadium: Gibboney Field

1904 Southern college football independents records
	Conf.			Overall
Team	W	L	T	W		L		T
Georgetown		–		7	–	1	–	0
Southwest Texas State		–		5	–	1	–	0
Southwestern Louisiana Industrial		–		2	–	0	–	1
Davidson		–		6	–	1	–	1
Navy		–		7	–	2	–	1
North Carolina		–		5	–	2	–	2
Virginia		–		6	–	3	–	0
North Carolina A&M		–		3	–	1	–	2
West Virginia		–		6	–	3	–	0
VPI		–		5	–	3	–	0
George Washington		–		4	–	2	–	2
Arkansas		–		4	–	3	–	0
Oklahoma		–		4	–	3	–	1
South Carolina		–		4	–	3	–	1
Stetson		–		2	–	2	–	0
Central Oklahoma		–		2	–	3	–	0
VMI		–		3	–	5	–	0
Kentucky University		–		3	–	4	–	0
Grant		–		2	–	3	–	0
Florida State College		–		2	–	3	–	0
Maryland		–		2	–	4	–	2
East Florida Seminary		–		1	–	2	–	0
Goldey College		–		1	–	2	–	0
Baylor		–		2	–	5	–	1
Louisiana Industrial		–		1	–	4	–	0
TCU		–		1	–	4	–	1
Delaware		–		1	–	5	–	1
Kendall		–		0	–	2	–	1
Rollins		–		0	–	1	–	0
Tusculum		–		0	–	2	–	0
Birmingham		–		0	–	3	–	0
Florida at Lake City		–		0	–	5	–	0
Oklahoma A&M		–		0	–	6	–	0
Tennessee Docs		–		0	–	7	–	0

The 1904 VPI football team represented Virginia Agricultural and Mechanical College and Polytechnic Institute in the 1904 college football season. The team was led by their head coach John C. O'Connor and finished with a record of five wins and three losses (5–3).

== Schedule ==
Date	Time	Opponent	Site	Result	Attendance	Source
October 1	3:45 p.m.	Richmond	Gibboney Field; Blacksburg, VA	W 18–0		
October 8		Washington and Lee	Gibboney Field; Blacksburg, VA	W 24–0		
October 12		Nashville	Gibboney Field; Blacksburg, VA	W 32–0		
October 22	3:45 p.m.	William & Mary	Gibboney Field; Blacksburg, VA	W 30–0		
October 29	2:35 p.m.	North Carolina	Gibboney Field; Blacksburg, VA	L 0–6	~1,000	
November 5		vs. Virginia	Broad Street Park; Richmond, VA (rivalry)	L 0–5	3,000	
November 19	2:36 p.m.	at Navy	Worden Field; Annapolis, MD	L 0–11		
November 24	3:20 p.m.	vs. VMI	Roanoke, VA (rivalry)	W 17–5	3,000	

== Before the season ==
The 1903 VPI football team compiled a 5–1 record and were led by Charles Augustus Lueder in his only season as head coach.

== Game summaries ==
=== Richmond ===
Richmond vs. VPI

Team	1	2	Total
Richmond	0	0	0
• VPI	6	12	18

- Date: October 1, 1904
- Location: Gibboney Field
  Blacksburg, VA
- Game start: 3:45 p.m.

VPI's first game of the season was a victory over Richmond at Gibboney Field.

=== Washington and Lee ===
Washington & Lee vs. VPI

Team	1	2	Total
W&L	0	0	0
• VPI	18	6	24

- Date: October 8, 1904
- Location: Gibboney Field
  Blacksburg, VA

After their victory over Richmond, VPI played Washington and Lee University at Gibboney Field.

The starting lineup for Washington & Lee was: Thomas Bagley (left end), T. G. Stone (left tackle), H. M. White (left guard), A. I. Miller (center), Emmett Rankin (right guard), H. W. Withers (right tackle), V. M. Miles (right end), J. R. H. Alexander (quarterback), Malcolm Campbell (left halfback), J .L. Anderson (right halfback), H. M. Moomaw (fullback). The substitutes were: Edward Hoge, E. F. King, F. E. Pryor and John Quisenberry.

=== Nashville ===
Nashville vs. VPI

Team	1	2	Total
Nashville	0	0	0
• VPI	22	10	32

- Date: October 12, 1904
- Location: Gibboney Field
  Blacksburg, VA

=== William & Mary ===
William & Mary vs. VPI

Team	1	2	Total
W&M	0	0	0
• VPI	26	4	30

- Date: October 22, 1904
- Location: Gibboney Field
  Blacksburg, VA
- Game start: 3:45 p.m.

=== North Carolina ===
North Carolina vs. VPI

Team	1	2	Total
• UNC	0	6	6
VPI	0	0	0

- Date: October 29, 1904
- Location: Gibboney Field
  Blacksburg, VA
- Game start: 2:35 p.m.
- Game attendance: ~1,000
- Referee: Baird

The starting lineup for VPI was: Miles (left end), Willson (left tackle), McColloch (left guard), Stiles (center), Stickling (right guard), Hynes (right tackle), Lewis (right end), E. Harris (quarterback), G. Harris (left halfback), Conner (right halfback), Nutter (fullback). The substitutes were: Cox, Harlan, and Robins.

The starting lineup for North Carolina was: Newman Townsend (left end), Webber (left tackle), Perry Seagle (left guard), Roach Stewart (center), John Maness (right guard), Romy Story (right tackle), Barry (right end), Jacocks (quarterback), Baer (left halfback), Newton (right halfback), Roberson (fullback). The substitutes were: George Singletary, Sitton, John Winborne and Isaac Wright.

=== Virginia ===
Virginia vs. VPI

Team	1	2	Total
• UVA	0	5	5
VPI	0	0	0

- Date: November 5, 1904
- Location: Broad Street Park
  Richmond, VA
- Game attendance: 3,000
- Referee: W. J. Thompson (Georgetown)

The starting lineup for VPI was: Robins (left end), Willson (left tackle), McCulloch (left guard), Stiles (center), Stickling (right guard), Hynes (right tackle), Lewis (right end), E. Harris (quarterback), G. Harris (left halfback), Conner (right halfback), Nutter (fullback). The substitutes were: Cox.

The starting lineup for Virginia was: W. Rice Warren (left end), Merritt Cooke Jr. (left tackle), George Kite (left guard), John Beckett (center), Terrence Murphy (right guard), Cothran (right tackle), Gray (right end), Oscar Randolph (quarterback), Edward Johnson (left halfback), John Purcell (right halfback), John Paul (fullback). The substitutes were: Springer.

=== Navy ===
VPI at Navy

Team	1	2	Total
VPI	0	0	0
• Navy	6	5	11

- Date: November 19, 1904
- Location: Worden Field
  Annapolis, MD
- Game start: 2:36 p.m.
- Referee: Myron E. Witham

The starting lineup for VPI was: Shuey (left end), Willson (left tackle), McCulloch (left guard), Stiles (center), Stickling (right guard), Hynes (right tackle), Lewis (right end), E. Harris (quarterback), G. Harris (left halfback), Conner (right halfback), Nutter (fullback). The substitutes were: Robins.

The starting lineup for Navy was: Bill Dague (left end), Louis Farley (left tackle), Nelson Goss (left guard), William McClintic (center), William Piersol (right guard), Ronan Grady (right tackle), Ken Whiting (right end), Homer Norton (quarterback), Herbert Spencer (left halfback), Stephen Doherty (right halfback), R. F. Smith (fullback). The substitutes were: Richard Bernard, Jonathan Dowell, Stephen McKinney, Joseph O'Brien, Leo Welch and John Wilcox.

=== VMI ===
VMI vs. VPI

Team	1	2	Total
VMI	5	0	5
• VPI	6	11	17

- Date: November 24, 1904
- Location: Roanoke, VA
- Game start: 3:20 p.m.
- Game attendance: 3,000
- Game weather: "cold wind"
- Referee: Williams

The starting lineup for VPI was: Robins (left end), Willson (left tackle), McCulloch (left guard), Stiles (center), Stickling (right guard), Hynes (right tackle), Lewis (right end), E. Harris (quarterback), G. Harris (left halfback), Conner (right halfback), Nutter (fullback). The substitutes were: Cox, Harlan, Lewis and Treadwell.

The starting lineup for VMI was: Rufus Morison (left end), David Etheridge (left tackle), Donald Fraser (left guard), William Riley (center), Alphonse Stude (right guard), Homer Pace (right tackle), Frank Steele (right end), Taliaferro (quarterback), Robert Massie (left halfback), William Beckner (right halfback), Russell James (fullback). The substitutes were: Mahlon Caffee and Richard Dodson.

== Players ==
The following players were members of the 1904 football team according to the roster published in the 1905 edition of The Bugle, the Virginia Tech yearbook.

VPI 1904 roster
Quarterback: Edwin Rollins Harris; Guards: McCulloch; Frank Henry Stickling; Tackles: Bernard Daxon Hynes; George Cralle Willson (Capt.); Center: Joseph Clay Stiles	Ends: Thomas Walker Lewis; Wilmer Nelson Robins; Halfbacks: Conner; George Newman Harris; Fullback: James Arthur Nutter	Substitutes: Leonard Ballard Cox; Murray Valentine Harlan; Miles; Philip McGregor Shuey; Harry A. Treadwell

== Coaching and training staff ==
- Head coach: John C. O'Connor
- Manager: T. H. Lewis
- Assistant managers
  - H. H. Gary
  - Charles Lumsden Lyon
- "Second varsity" head coach: Sally Miles
- "Second varsity" manager: Joaquin de la Coya
