= 1904 Navy Midshipmen football team =

American college football season

1904 Navy Midshipmen football
- Conference: Independent
- Record: 7–2–1
- Head coach: Paul Dashiell (1st season)
- Captain: Lou Farley
- Home stadium: Worden Field

1904 Southern college football independents records
	Conf.			Overall
Team	W	L	T	W		L		T
Georgetown		–		7	–	1	–	0
Southwest Texas State		–		5	–	1	–	0
Southwestern Louisiana Industrial		–		2	–	0	–	1
Davidson		–		6	–	1	–	1
Navy		–		7	–	2	–	1
North Carolina		–		5	–	2	–	2
Virginia		–		6	–	3	–	0
North Carolina A&M		–		3	–	1	–	2
West Virginia		–		6	–	3	–	0
VPI		–		5	–	3	–	0
George Washington		–		4	–	2	–	2
Arkansas		–		4	–	3	–	0
Oklahoma		–		4	–	3	–	1
South Carolina		–		4	–	3	–	1
Stetson		–		2	–	2	–	0
Central Oklahoma		–		2	–	3	–	0
VMI		–		3	–	5	–	0
Kentucky University		–		3	–	4	–	0
Grant		–		2	–	3	–	0
Florida State College		–		2	–	3	–	0
Maryland		–		2	–	4	–	2
East Florida Seminary		–		1	–	2	–	0
Goldey College		–		1	–	2	–	0
Baylor		–		2	–	5	–	1
Louisiana Industrial		–		1	–	4	–	0
TCU		–		1	–	4	–	1
Delaware		–		1	–	5	–	1
Kendall		–		0	–	2	–	1
Rollins		–		0	–	1	–	0
Tusculum		–		0	–	2	–	0
Birmingham		–		0	–	3	–	0
Florida at Lake City		–		0	–	5	–	0
Oklahoma A&M		–		0	–	6	–	0
Tennessee Docs		–		0	–	7	–	0

The 1904 Navy Midshipmen football team represented the United States Naval Academy during the 1904 college football season. In their first season under head coach Paul Dashiell, the Midshipmen compiled a 7–2–1 record, shut out six opponents, and outscored all opponents by a combined score of 149 to 38.

== Schedule ==
Date	Opponent	Site	Result	Source
October 6	VMI	Worden Field; Annapolis, MD	W 12–0	
October 12	Marine Officers	Worden Field; Annapolis, MD	W 68–0	
October 15	Princeton	Worden Field; Annapolis, MD	W 10–9	
October 19	St. John's (MD)	Worden Field; Annapolis, MD	W 23–0	
October 22	Dickinson	Worden Field; Annapolis, MD	T 0–0	
October 29	Swarthmore	Worden Field; Annapolis, MD	L 0–9	
November 5	Penn State	Worden Field; Annapolis, MD	W 20–9	
November 12	at Virginia	Madison Hall Field; Charlottesville, VA	W 5–0	
November 19	VPI	Worden Field; Annapolis, MD	W 11–0	
November 26	vs. Army	Franklin Field; Philadelphia, PA (Army–Navy Game)	L 0–11	
