= 1904 George Washington Hatchetites football team =

American college football season

1904 George Washington Hatchetites football
- Conference: Independent
- Record: 4–2–2
- Head coach: Alexander Rorke (1st season)

1904 Southern college football independents records
	Conf.			Overall
Team	W	L	T	W		L		T
Georgetown		–		7	–	1	–	0
Southwest Texas State		–		5	–	1	–	0
Southwestern Louisiana Industrial		–		2	–	0	–	1
Davidson		–		6	–	1	–	1
Navy		–		7	–	2	–	1
North Carolina		–		5	–	2	–	2
Virginia		–		6	–	3	–	0
North Carolina A&M		–		3	–	1	–	2
West Virginia		–		6	–	3	–	0
VPI		–		5	–	3	–	0
George Washington		–		4	–	2	–	2
Arkansas		–		4	–	3	–	0
Oklahoma		–		4	–	3	–	1
South Carolina		–		4	–	3	–	1
Stetson		–		2	–	2	–	0
Central Oklahoma		–		2	–	3	–	0
VMI		–		3	–	5	–	0
Kentucky University		–		3	–	4	–	0
Grant		–		2	–	3	–	0
Florida State College		–		2	–	3	–	0
Maryland		–		2	–	4	–	2
East Florida Seminary		–		1	–	2	–	0
Goldey College		–		1	–	2	–	0
Baylor		–		2	–	5	–	1
Louisiana Industrial		–		1	–	4	–	0
TCU		–		1	–	4	–	1
Delaware		–		1	–	5	–	1
Kendall		–		0	–	2	–	1
Rollins		–		0	–	1	–	0
Tusculum		–		0	–	2	–	0
Birmingham		–		0	–	3	–	0
Florida at Lake City		–		0	–	5	–	0
Oklahoma A&M		–		0	–	6	–	0
Tennessee Docs		–		0	–	7	–	0

The 1904 George Washington Hatchetites football was an American football team that represented George Washington University as an independent during the 1904 college football season. In their first season under head coach Alexander Rorke, the team compiled a 4–2–2 record.

== Schedule ==
Date	Opponent	Site	Result	Source
October 3	Randolph–Macon	University Field; Washington, DC	W 17–0	
October 8	Western Maryland	University Field; Washington, DC	L 0–6	
October 15	Richmond	University Field; Washington, DC	W 17–0	
October 22	Gallaudet	University Field; Washington, DC	W 7–0	
October 29	University of Maryland, Baltimore	Van Ness Park; Washington, DC	T 0–0	
November 5	at Johns Hopkins	Oriole Park; Baltimore, MD	T 0–0	
November 12	Maryland Medical College	Van Ness Park; Washington, DC	W 11–0	
November 19	vs. Georgetown	National Park; Washington, DC	L 0–60	
