= 1904 Davidson football team =

American college football season

1904 Davidson football
- Conference: Independent
- Record: 6–1–1
- Head coach: Bob Williams (1st season)

1904 Southern college football independents records
	Conf.			Overall
Team	W	L	T	W		L		T
Georgetown		–		7	–	1	–	0
Southwest Texas State		–		5	–	1	–	0
Southwestern Louisiana Industrial		–		2	–	0	–	1
Davidson		–		6	–	1	–	1
Navy		–		7	–	2	–	1
North Carolina		–		5	–	2	–	2
Virginia		–		6	–	3	–	0
North Carolina A&M		–		3	–	1	–	2
West Virginia		–		6	–	3	–	0
VPI		–		5	–	3	–	0
George Washington		–		4	–	2	–	2
Arkansas		–		4	–	3	–	0
Oklahoma		–		4	–	3	–	1
South Carolina		–		4	–	3	–	1
Stetson		–		2	–	2	–	0
Central Oklahoma		–		2	–	3	–	0
VMI		–		3	–	5	–	0
Kentucky University		–		3	–	4	–	0
Grant		–		2	–	3	–	0
Florida State College		–		2	–	3	–	0
Maryland		–		2	–	4	–	2
East Florida Seminary		–		1	–	2	–	0
Goldey College		–		1	–	2	–	0
Baylor		–		2	–	5	–	1
Louisiana Industrial		–		1	–	4	–	0
TCU		–		1	–	4	–	1
Delaware		–		1	–	5	–	1
Kendall		–		0	–	2	–	1
Rollins		–		0	–	1	–	0
Tusculum		–		0	–	2	–	0
Birmingham		–		0	–	3	–	0
Florida at Lake City		–		0	–	5	–	0
Oklahoma A&M		–		0	–	6	–	0
Tennessee Docs		–		0	–	7	–	0

The 1904 Davidson football team was an American football team that represented the Davidson College as an independent during the 1904 college football season. In their first year under head coach Bob Williams, the team compiled a 6–1–1 record.

== Schedule ==
Date	Opponent	Site	Result	Attendance	Source
September 24	Morganton Mutes	Davidson, NC	W 28–0		
October 8	vs. North Carolina	Mecklenburg Fair Grounds; Charlotte, NC	T 0–0	500	
October 15	Bingham Military School	Davidson, NC	W 17–0		
October 21	Guilford	Davidson, NC	W 5–0		
November 4	at VMI	VMI Parade Ground; Lexington, VA	L 0–6		
November 12	at South Carolina	Columbia, SC	W 6–0		
November 16	at Welsh Neck High School	Hartsville, SC	W 23–0		
November 24	vs. Guilford	South Side Park; Winston-Salem, NC	W 32–6		
