= 1904 Louisiana Industrial football team =

American college football season

1904 Louisiana Industrial football
- Conference: Independent
- Record: 1–4
- Head coach: E. G. Pierce (1st season)
- Captain: Glenn M. Walker

1904 Southern college football independents records
	Conf.			Overall
Team	W	L	T	W		L		T
Georgetown		–		7	–	1	–	0
Southwest Texas State		–		5	–	1	–	0
Southwestern Louisiana Industrial		–		2	–	0	–	1
Davidson		–		6	–	1	–	1
Navy		–		7	–	2	–	1
North Carolina		–		5	–	2	–	2
Virginia		–		6	–	3	–	0
North Carolina A&M		–		3	–	1	–	2
West Virginia		–		6	–	3	–	0
VPI		–		5	–	3	–	0
George Washington		–		4	–	2	–	2
Arkansas		–		4	–	3	–	0
Oklahoma		–		4	–	3	–	1
South Carolina		–		4	–	3	–	1
Stetson		–		2	–	2	–	0
Central Oklahoma		–		2	–	3	–	0
VMI		–		3	–	5	–	0
Kentucky University		–		3	–	4	–	0
Grant		–		2	–	3	–	0
Florida State College		–		2	–	3	–	0
Maryland		–		2	–	4	–	2
East Florida Seminary		–		1	–	2	–	0
Goldey College		–		1	–	2	–	0
Baylor		–		2	–	5	–	1
Louisiana Industrial		–		1	–	4	–	0
TCU		–		1	–	4	–	1
Delaware		–		1	–	5	–	1
Kendall		–		0	–	2	–	1
Rollins		–		0	–	1	–	0
Tusculum		–		0	–	2	–	0
Birmingham		–		0	–	3	–	0
Florida at Lake City		–		0	–	5	–	0
Oklahoma A&M		–		0	–	6	–	0
Tennessee Docs		–		0	–	7	–	0

The 1904 Louisiana Industrial football team was an American football team that represented the Louisiana Industrial Institute—now known as Louisiana Tech University—as an independent during the 1904 college football season. In their first and only season under head coach E. G. Pierce, Louisiana Industrial compiled a 1–4 record. The team's captain was Glenn M. Walker.

== Schedule ==
Date	Opponent	Site	Result	Source
October 13	at Shreveport Athletic Association	Shreveport Ball Park; Shreveport, LA	L 0–22	
October 21	at LSU	State Field; Baton Rouge, LA	L 0–17	
October 22	at Tulane	Athletic Park; New Orleans, LA	L 0–11	
October 29	LSU	Ruston, LA	W 6–0	
November 19	at Mississippi A&M	Starkville Fairgrounds; Starkville, MS	L 5–32	
