= 1904 Grant football team =

American college football season

1904 Grant football
- Conference: Independent
- Record: 2–3
- Head coach: Walter Hullihen (1st season)
- Captain: E. E. DeLaperrierre
- Home stadium: Olympic Park Field

1904 Southern college football independents records
	Conf.			Overall
Team	W	L	T	W		L		T
Georgetown		–		7	–	1	–	0
Southwest Texas State		–		5	–	1	–	0
Southwestern Louisiana Industrial		–		2	–	0	–	1
Davidson		–		6	–	1	–	1
Navy		–		7	–	2	–	1
North Carolina		–		5	–	2	–	2
Virginia		–		6	–	3	–	0
North Carolina A&M		–		3	–	1	–	2
West Virginia		–		6	–	3	–	0
VPI		–		5	–	3	–	0
George Washington		–		4	–	2	–	2
Arkansas		–		4	–	3	–	0
Oklahoma		–		4	–	3	–	1
South Carolina		–		4	–	3	–	1
Stetson		–		2	–	2	–	0
Central Oklahoma		–		2	–	3	–	0
VMI		–		3	–	5	–	0
Kentucky University		–		3	–	4	–	0
Grant		–		2	–	3	–	0
Florida State College		–		2	–	3	–	0
Maryland		–		2	–	4	–	2
East Florida Seminary		–		1	–	2	–	0
Goldey College		–		1	–	2	–	0
Baylor		–		2	–	5	–	1
Louisiana Industrial		–		1	–	4	–	0
TCU		–		1	–	4	–	1
Delaware		–		1	–	5	–	1
Kendall		–		0	–	2	–	1
Rollins		–		0	–	1	–	0
Tusculum		–		0	–	2	–	0
Birmingham		–		0	–	3	–	0
Florida at Lake City		–		0	–	5	–	0
Oklahoma A&M		–		0	–	6	–	0
Tennessee Docs		–		0	–	7	–	0

The 1904 Grant football team represented the Chattanooga campus of U.S. Grant Memorial University—now known as the University of Tennessee at Chattanooga—as an independent in the 1904 college football season.

== Schedule ==
Date	Opponent	Site	Result	Source
October 29	Athens	Olympic Park Field; Chattanooga, TN	W 17–0	
November 5	Livingston Normal	Olympic Park Field; Chattanooga, TN	W 5–0	
November 19	Tennessee	Olympic Park Field; Chattanooga, TN	L 0–23	
November 24	7th Cavalry	Olympic Park Field; Chattanooga, TN	L 0–17	
December 3	Chattanooga High School	Olympic Park Field; Chattanooga, TN	L 0–6	
