= 1904 TCU football team =

American college football season

1904 TCU football
- Conference: Independent
- Record: 1–4–1
- Head coach: C. E. Cronk (1st season)

1904 Southern college football independents records
	Conf.			Overall
Team	W	L	T	W		L		T
Georgetown		–		7	–	1	–	0
Southwest Texas State		–		5	–	1	–	0
Southwestern Louisiana Industrial		–		2	–	0	–	1
Davidson		–		6	–	1	–	1
Navy		–		7	–	2	–	1
North Carolina		–		5	–	2	–	2
Virginia		–		6	–	3	–	0
North Carolina A&M		–		3	–	1	–	2
West Virginia		–		6	–	3	–	0
VPI		–		5	–	3	–	0
George Washington		–		4	–	2	–	2
Arkansas		–		4	–	3	–	0
Oklahoma		–		4	–	3	–	1
South Carolina		–		4	–	3	–	1
Stetson		–		2	–	2	–	0
Central Oklahoma		–		2	–	3	–	0
VMI		–		3	–	5	–	0
Kentucky University		–		3	–	4	–	0
Grant		–		2	–	3	–	0
Florida State College		–		2	–	3	–	0
Maryland		–		2	–	4	–	2
East Florida Seminary		–		1	–	2	–	0
Goldey College		–		1	–	2	–	0
Baylor		–		2	–	5	–	1
Louisiana Industrial		–		1	–	4	–	0
TCU		–		1	–	4	–	1
Delaware		–		1	–	5	–	1
Kendall		–		0	–	2	–	1
Rollins		–		0	–	1	–	0
Tusculum		–		0	–	2	–	0
Birmingham		–		0	–	3	–	0
Florida at Lake City		–		0	–	5	–	0
Oklahoma A&M		–		0	–	6	–	0
Tennessee Docs		–		0	–	7	–	0

The 1904 TCU football team represented Texas Christian University (TCU) as an independent during the 1904 college football season. Le by C. E. Cronk in his first and only year as head coach, TCU compiled a record of 1–4–1. They played their home games in Waco, Texas.

== Schedule ==
Date	Opponent	Site	Result	Attendance	Source
October 1	Baylor	Waco, TX (rivalry)	T 0–0		
October 8	at Texas	Clark Field; Austin, TX (rivalry)	L 0–40		
October 15	vs. Fort Worth	Dallas, TX	L 0–4		
October 22	at Texas A&M	College Station, TX (rivalry)	L 0–29		
November 12	Baylor	Waco, TX	L 0–17		
November 24	at Baylor	Carroll Field; Waco, TX	W 5–0	1,000	
