= 1904 Tennessee Docs football team =

American college football season

1904 Tennessee Docs football
- Conference: Independent
- Record: 0–7
- Home stadium: Athletic Park

1904 Southern college football independents records
	Conf.			Overall
Team	W	L	T	W		L		T
Georgetown		–		7	–	1	–	0
Southwest Texas State		–		5	–	1	–	0
Southwestern Louisiana Industrial		–		2	–	0	–	1
Davidson		–		6	–	1	–	1
Navy		–		7	–	2	–	1
North Carolina		–		5	–	2	–	2
Virginia		–		6	–	3	–	0
North Carolina A&M		–		3	–	1	–	2
West Virginia		–		6	–	3	–	0
VPI		–		5	–	3	–	0
George Washington		–		4	–	2	–	2
Arkansas		–		4	–	3	–	0
Oklahoma		–		4	–	3	–	1
South Carolina		–		4	–	3	–	1
Stetson		–		2	–	2	–	0
Central Oklahoma		–		2	–	3	–	0
VMI		–		3	–	5	–	0
Kentucky University		–		3	–	4	–	0
Grant		–		2	–	3	–	0
Florida State College		–		2	–	3	–	0
Maryland		–		2	–	4	–	2
East Florida Seminary		–		1	–	2	–	0
Goldey College		–		1	–	2	–	0
Baylor		–		2	–	5	–	1
Louisiana Industrial		–		1	–	4	–	0
TCU		–		1	–	4	–	1
Delaware		–		1	–	5	–	1
Kendall		–		0	–	2	–	1
Rollins		–		0	–	1	–	0
Tusculum		–		0	–	2	–	0
Birmingham		–		0	–	3	–	0
Florida at Lake City		–		0	–	5	–	0
Oklahoma A&M		–		0	–	6	–	0
Tennessee Docs		–		0	–	7	–	0

The 1904 Tennessee Docs football team represented University of Tennessee College of Medicine as an independent during the 1904 college football season.

== Schedule ==
Date	Time	Opponent	Site	Result	Source
October 8		at Nashville	Peabody Field; Nashville, TN	L 0–21	
October 11		at Sewanee	Hardee Field; Sewanee, TN	L 0–58	
October 31	3:00 p.m.	Central University (KY)	Athletic Park; Nashville, TN	L 5–15	
November 10		at LSU	State Field; Baton Rouge, LA	L 0–59	
November 11		at Mississippi A&M	Starkville Fairgrounds; Starkville, MS	L 0–59	
November 12		vs. Ole Miss	League Park; Jackson, MS	L 0–46	
November 16	1:30 p.m.	at Georgia Tech	Piedmont Park; Atlanta, GA	L 0–59	
All times are in Central time
