= 1904 Maryland Aggies football team =

American college football season

1904 Maryland Aggies football
- Conference: Independent
- Record: 2–4–2
- Head coach: D. John Markey (3rd season)
- Home stadium: Maryland Agricultural College Field

1904 Southern college football independents records
| | Conf. | | | Overall |
| Team | W | L | T | W | | L | | T |
|---|---|---|---|---|---|---|---|---|
| Georgetown | | – | | 7 | – | 1 | – | 0 |
| Southwest Texas State | | – | | 5 | – | 1 | – | 0 |
| Southwestern Louisiana Industrial | | – | | 2 | – | 0 | – | 1 |
| Davidson | | – | | 6 | – | 1 | – | 1 |
| Navy | | – | | 7 | – | 2 | – | 1 |
| North Carolina | | – | | 5 | – | 2 | – | 2 |
| Virginia | | – | | 6 | – | 3 | – | 0 |
| North Carolina A&M | | – | | 3 | – | 1 | – | 2 |
| West Virginia | | – | | 6 | – | 3 | – | 0 |
| VPI | | – | | 5 | – | 3 | – | 0 |
| George Washington | | – | | 4 | – | 2 | – | 2 |
| Arkansas | | – | | 4 | – | 3 | – | 0 |
| Oklahoma | | – | | 4 | – | 3 | – | 1 |
| South Carolina | | – | | 4 | – | 3 | – | 1 |
| Stetson | | – | | 2 | – | 2 | – | 0 |
| Central Oklahoma | | – | | 2 | – | 3 | – | 0 |
| VMI | | – | | 3 | – | 5 | – | 0 |
| Kentucky University | | – | | 3 | – | 4 | – | 0 |
| Grant | | – | | 2 | – | 3 | – | 0 |
| Florida State College | | – | | 2 | – | 3 | – | 0 |
| Maryland | | – | | 2 | – | 4 | – | 2 |
| East Florida Seminary | | – | | 1 | – | 2 | – | 0 |
| Goldey College | | – | | 1 | – | 2 | – | 0 |
| Baylor | | – | | 2 | – | 5 | – | 1 |
| Louisiana Industrial | | – | | 1 | – | 4 | – | 0 |
| TCU | | – | | 1 | – | 4 | – | 1 |
| Delaware | | – | | 1 | – | 5 | – | 1 |
| Kendall | | – | | 0 | – | 2 | – | 1 |
| Rollins | | – | | 0 | – | 1 | – | 0 |
| Tusculum | | – | | 0 | – | 2 | – | 0 |
| Birmingham | | – | | 0 | – | 3 | – | 0 |
| Florida at Lake City | | – | | 0 | – | 5 | – | 0 |
| Oklahoma A&M | | – | | 0 | – | 6 | – | 0 |
| Tennessee Docs | | – | | 0 | – | 7 | – | 0 |

The 1904 Maryland Aggies football team represented Maryland Agricultural College (later part of the University of Maryland) in the 1904 college football season. In their third and final season under head coach D. John Markey, the Aggies compiled a 2–4–2 record and were outscored by all opponents, 62 to 33.

== Schedule ==
| Date | Opponent | Site | Result | Source |
|---|---|---|---|---|
| September 24 | at Georgetown | Georgetown Field; Washington, DC | L 0–22 | |
| October 1 | Randolph–Macon | College Park, MD | T 0–0 | |
| October 8 | at Fort Monroe | Hampton, VA | T 0–0 | |
| October 15 | at Mount St. Mary's | Emmitsburg, MD | W 11–6 | |
| October 22 | at Western Maryland | Westminster, MD | L 0–5 | |
| November 5 | at University of Maryland, Baltimore | Walbrook Oval; Baltimore, MD | L 0–6 | |
| November 19 | at Gallaudet | Washington, DC | W 23–5 | |
| November 24 | at Delaware | Athletic Field; Newark, DE | L 0–18 | |
