= 1904 Stetson Hatters football team =

American college football season

1904 Stetson Hatters football
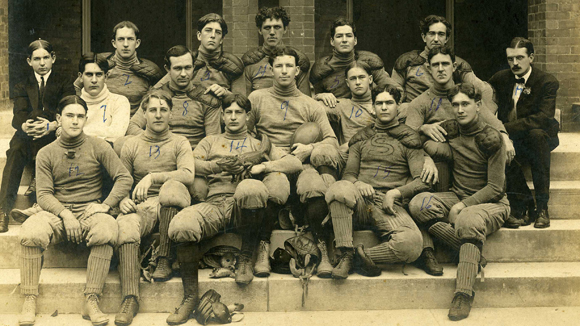
- Conference: Independent
- Record: 2–2
- Head coach: Litchfield Colton (2nd season)

1904 Southern college football independents records
	Conf.			Overall
Team	W	L	T	W		L		T
Georgetown		–		7	–	1	–	0
Southwest Texas State		–		5	–	1	–	0
Southwestern Louisiana Industrial		–		2	–	0	–	1
Davidson		–		6	–	1	–	1
Navy		–		7	–	2	–	1
North Carolina		–		5	–	2	–	2
Virginia		–		6	–	3	–	0
North Carolina A&M		–		3	–	1	–	2
West Virginia		–		6	–	3	–	0
VPI		–		5	–	3	–	0
George Washington		–		4	–	2	–	2
Arkansas		–		4	–	3	–	0
Oklahoma		–		4	–	3	–	1
South Carolina		–		4	–	3	–	1
Stetson		–		2	–	2	–	0
Central Oklahoma		–		2	–	3	–	0
VMI		–		3	–	5	–	0
Kentucky University		–		3	–	4	–	0
Grant		–		2	–	3	–	0
Florida State College		–		2	–	3	–	0
Maryland		–		2	–	4	–	2
East Florida Seminary		–		1	–	2	–	0
Goldey College		–		1	–	2	–	0
Baylor		–		2	–	5	–	1
Louisiana Industrial		–		1	–	4	–	0
TCU		–		1	–	4	–	1
Delaware		–		1	–	5	–	1
Kendall		–		0	–	2	–	1
Rollins		–		0	–	1	–	0
Tusculum		–		0	–	2	–	0
Birmingham		–		0	–	3	–	0
Florida at Lake City		–		0	–	5	–	0
Oklahoma A&M		–		0	–	6	–	0
Tennessee Docs		–		0	–	7	–	0

The 1904 Stetson Hatters football team represented the private Stetson College in the sport of American football during the 1904 college football season. Stetson lost the first game of the season to Jacksonville in a "stupid game."

== Schedule ==
Date	Time	Opponent	Site	Result	Source
October 14		Jacksonville Jays	Jacksonville, FL	L 0–6	
November 4	3:00 p.m.	East Florida Seminary		W 16–0	
November 14		at East Florida Seminary	Gainesville, FL	W 21–0	
November 24		at Florida State College	Tallahassee, FL	L 6–18	
