= 1904 North Carolina Tar Heels football team =

American college football season

1904 North Carolina Tar Heels football
- Conference: Independent
- Record: 5–2–2
- Head coach: R. R. Brown (1st season)
- Captain: R. S. Stewart
- Home stadium: Campus Athletic Field (II)

1904 Southern college football independents records
	Conf.			Overall
Team	W	L	T	W		L		T
Georgetown		–		7	–	1	–	0
Southwest Texas State		–		5	–	1	–	0
Southwestern Louisiana Industrial		–		2	–	0	–	1
Davidson		–		6	–	1	–	1
Navy		–		7	–	2	–	1
North Carolina		–		5	–	2	–	2
Virginia		–		6	–	3	–	0
North Carolina A&M		–		3	–	1	–	2
West Virginia		–		6	–	3	–	0
VPI		–		5	–	3	–	0
George Washington		–		4	–	2	–	2
Arkansas		–		4	–	3	–	0
Oklahoma		–		4	–	3	–	1
South Carolina		–		4	–	3	–	1
Stetson		–		2	–	2	–	0
Central Oklahoma		–		2	–	3	–	0
VMI		–		3	–	5	–	0
Kentucky University		–		3	–	4	–	0
Grant		–		2	–	3	–	0
Florida State College		–		2	–	3	–	0
Maryland		–		2	–	4	–	2
East Florida Seminary		–		1	–	2	–	0
Goldey College		–		1	–	2	–	0
Baylor		–		2	–	5	–	1
Louisiana Industrial		–		1	–	4	–	0
TCU		–		1	–	4	–	1
Delaware		–		1	–	5	–	1
Kendall		–		0	–	2	–	1
Rollins		–		0	–	1	–	0
Tusculum		–		0	–	2	–	0
Birmingham		–		0	–	3	–	0
Florida at Lake City		–		0	–	5	–	0
Oklahoma A&M		–		0	–	6	–	0
Tennessee Docs		–		0	–	7	–	0

The 1904 North Carolina Tar Heels football team represented the University of North Carolina at Chapel Hill in the 1904 college football season. The team captain for the 1904 season was R. S. Stewart.

== Schedule ==
Date	Time	Opponent	Site	Result	Attendance	Source
October 1		Guilford	Campus Athletic Field (II); Chapel Hill, NC	W 29–0		
October 8	3:30 p.m.	vs. Davidson	Latta Park; Charlotte, NC	T 0–0	500	
October 12	4:00 p.m.	William Bingham School	Campus Athletic Field (II); Chapel Hill, NC	W 50–0		
October 15		South Carolina	Campus Athletic Field (II); Chapel Hill, NC (rivalry)	W 27–0		
October 22	3:30 p.m.	vs. Norfolk Athletic Association	Cone Athletic Park (I); Greensboro, NC	W 41–0		
October 29		at VPI	Gibboney Field; Blacksburg, VA	W 6–0		
November 5	2:30 p.m.	vs. Georgetown	Lafayette Field; Norfolk, VA	L 0–16	3,000	
November 16	2:30 p.m.	North Carolina A&M	Campus Athletic Field (II); Chapel Hill, NC (rivalry)	T 6–6	2,000	
November 24	2:00 p.m.	vs. Virginia	Broad Street Park (I); Richmond, VA (rivalry)	L 11–12	15,000	
