= 1904 West Virginia Mountaineers football team =

American college football season

1904 West Virginia Mountaineers football
- Conference: Independent
- Record: 6–3
- Head coach: Anthony Chez (1st season)
- Captain: Paul H. Martin

1904 Southern college football independents records
	Conf.			Overall
Team	W	L	T	W		L		T
Georgetown		–		7	–	1	–	0
Southwest Texas State		–		5	–	1	–	0
Southwestern Louisiana Industrial		–		2	–	0	–	1
Davidson		–		6	–	1	–	1
Navy		–		7	–	2	–	1
North Carolina		–		5	–	2	–	2
Virginia		–		6	–	3	–	0
North Carolina A&M		–		3	–	1	–	2
West Virginia		–		6	–	3	–	0
VPI		–		5	–	3	–	0
George Washington		–		4	–	2	–	2
Arkansas		–		4	–	3	–	0
Oklahoma		–		4	–	3	–	1
South Carolina		–		4	–	3	–	1
Stetson		–		2	–	2	–	0
Central Oklahoma		–		2	–	3	–	0
VMI		–		3	–	5	–	0
Kentucky University		–		3	–	4	–	0
Grant		–		2	–	3	–	0
Florida State College		–		2	–	3	–	0
Maryland		–		2	–	4	–	2
East Florida Seminary		–		1	–	2	–	0
Goldey College		–		1	–	2	–	0
Baylor		–		2	–	5	–	1
Louisiana Industrial		–		1	–	4	–	0
TCU		–		1	–	4	–	1
Delaware		–		1	–	5	–	1
Kendall		–		0	–	2	–	1
Rollins		–		0	–	1	–	0
Tusculum		–		0	–	2	–	0
Birmingham		–		0	–	3	–	0
Florida at Lake City		–		0	–	5	–	0
Oklahoma A&M		–		0	–	6	–	0
Tennessee Docs		–		0	–	7	–	0

The 1904 West Virginia Mountaineers football team was an American football team that represented West Virginia University as an independent during the 1904 college football season. In its first season under head coach Anthony Chez, the team compiled a 6–3 record but was outscored by a total of 233 to 99. (The overall point totals were skewed by a 130–0 loss to Michigan.) Paul H. Martin was the team captain.

Notably, 1904 marked the first season where WUP/Pitt, Penn State, and West Virginia played a full round robin. Thus, 1904 marked the first season of the Big Three championship.

== Schedule ==
Date	Time	Opponent	Site	Result	Attendance	Source
September 24		Westminster (PA)	Morgantown, WV	W 15–0		
October 1		California Normal (PA)	Morgantown, WV	W 16–0		
October 7		Ohio Wesleyan	Morgantown, WV	W 19–11		
October 15		at Penn State	State College, PA (rivalry)	L 0–34		
October 22		at Michigan	Regents Field; Ann Arbor, MI	L 0–130	4,000	
November 8		at Western University of Pennsylvania	Exposition Park; Pittsburgh, PA (rivalry)	L 0–53	4,000	
November 15		Alumni and All Stars	Morgantown, WV	W 18–0		
November 19	3:30 p.m.	at Washington University	World's Fair Stadium; St. Louis, MO	W 6–5		
November 24		at Marietta	Marietta, OH	W 25–0		
All times are in Eastern time
