= 1904 Baylor football team =

American college football season

1904 Baylor football
- Conference: Independent
- Record: 2–5–1
- Head coach: Sol Metzger (1st season)
- Captain: W. S. Morrow

1904 Southern college football independents records
	Conf.			Overall
Team	W	L	T	W		L		T
Georgetown		–		7	–	1	–	0
Southwest Texas State		–		5	–	1	–	0
Southwestern Louisiana Industrial		–		2	–	0	–	1
Davidson		–		6	–	1	–	1
Navy		–		7	–	2	–	1
North Carolina		–		5	–	2	–	2
Virginia		–		6	–	3	–	0
North Carolina A&M		–		3	–	1	–	2
West Virginia		–		6	–	3	–	0
VPI		–		5	–	3	–	0
George Washington		–		4	–	2	–	2
Arkansas		–		4	–	3	–	0
Oklahoma		–		4	–	3	–	1
South Carolina		–		4	–	3	–	1
Stetson		–		2	–	2	–	0
Central Oklahoma		–		2	–	3	–	0
VMI		–		3	–	5	–	0
Kentucky University		–		3	–	4	–	0
Grant		–		2	–	3	–	0
Florida State College		–		2	–	3	–	0
Maryland		–		2	–	4	–	2
East Florida Seminary		–		1	–	2	–	0
Goldey College		–		1	–	2	–	0
Baylor		–		2	–	5	–	1
Louisiana Industrial		–		1	–	4	–	0
TCU		–		1	–	4	–	1
Delaware		–		1	–	5	–	1
Kendall		–		0	–	2	–	1
Rollins		–		0	–	1	–	0
Tusculum		–		0	–	2	–	0
Birmingham		–		0	–	3	–	0
Florida at Lake City		–		0	–	5	–	0
Oklahoma A&M		–		0	–	6	–	0
Tennessee Docs		–		0	–	7	–	0

The 1904 Baylor football team was an American football team that represented Baylor University as an independent during the 1904 college football season. In its first season under head coach Sol Metzger, the team compiled a 2–5–1 record.

Metzger was brought to Baylor following successes with his previous football teams as both player and captain. At Andover, "the leading preparatory school of the East" at the time, he played two years of football. He subsequently attended the University of Pennsylvania, where he was selected as captain of the freshman football team; after two years of varsity football, the senior was selected as captain of the varsity team and graduated with honor from Penn.

In March 1904, the Southwestern Intercollegiate Athletic Association was formed, encompassing:

"the States of Texas, Arkansas, Missouri, Kansas, Colorado and the Territories of New Mexico, Oklahoma and the Indian Territory. Nearly every important institution within this district is either now a member or has signified its intention of joining in the near future."

Following the season, Lester, a right tackle for Baylor, was selected to the All Southwestern football team as a substitute, and center Townes was noted as the greatest rival in the Southwest to Texas's center Glascock.

== Schedule ==
Date	Opponent	Site	Result	Attendance	Source
October 1	at TCU	Waco, TX (rivalry)	T 0–0		
October 15	Texas A&M	Waco, TX (rivalry)	L 0–5		
October 22	Trinity (TX)	Waco, TX	L 0–22		
October 31	Arkansas	Waco, TX	W 11–6		
November 5	Texas A&M	Waco, TX	L 0–10		
November 12	at TCU	Waco, TX	W 17–0		
November 19	Texas	Waco, TX (rivalry)	L 0–58		
November 24	TCU	Carroll Field; Waco, TX	L 0–5	1,000	
