= 1904 Georgetown Blue and Gray football team =

American college football season

1904 Georgetown Blue and Gray football

Southern champion
- Conference: Independent
- Record: 7–1
- Head coach: Joe Reilly (1st season)
- Captain: Matt Mahoney
- Home stadium: Georgetown Field

1904 Southern college football independents records
	Conf.			Overall
Team	W	L	T	W		L		T
Georgetown		–		7	–	1	–	0
Southwest Texas State		–		5	–	1	–	0
Southwestern Louisiana Industrial		–		2	–	0	–	1
Davidson		–		6	–	1	–	1
Navy		–		7	–	2	–	1
North Carolina		–		5	–	2	–	2
Virginia		–		6	–	3	–	0
North Carolina A&M		–		3	–	1	–	2
West Virginia		–		6	–	3	–	0
VPI		–		5	–	3	–	0
George Washington		–		4	–	2	–	2
Arkansas		–		4	–	3	–	0
Oklahoma		–		4	–	3	–	1
South Carolina		–		4	–	3	–	1
Stetson		–		2	–	2	–	0
Central Oklahoma		–		2	–	3	–	0
VMI		–		3	–	5	–	0
Kentucky University		–		3	–	4	–	0
Grant		–		2	–	3	–	0
Florida State College		–		2	–	3	–	0
Maryland		–		2	–	4	–	2
East Florida Seminary		–		1	–	2	–	0
Goldey College		–		1	–	2	–	0
Baylor		–		2	–	5	–	1
Louisiana Industrial		–		1	–	4	–	0
TCU		–		1	–	4	–	1
Delaware		–		1	–	5	–	1
Kendall		–		0	–	2	–	1
Rollins		–		0	–	1	–	0
Tusculum		–		0	–	2	–	0
Birmingham		–		0	–	3	–	0
Florida at Lake City		–		0	–	5	–	0
Oklahoma A&M		–		0	–	6	–	0
Tennessee Docs		–		0	–	7	–	0

The 1904 Georgetown Blue and Gray football team represented Georgetown University during the 1904 college football season. Led by Joe Reilly in his first year as head coach, the team went 7–1 and claims a Southern championship.

== Schedule ==
Date	Time	Opponent	Site	Result	Attendance	Source
September 24		Maryland	Georgetown Field; Washington, DC	W 22–0		
October 1		at Princeton	University Field; Princeton, NJ	L 0–10		
October 15		Villanova	Georgetown Field; Washington, DC	W 17–0		
October 22		Washington and Lee	Georgetown Field; Washington, DC	W 47–0		
October 29		vs. Holy Cross	Columbia Park; Philadelphia, PA	W 17–4	5,000	
November 5		vs. North Carolina	Lafayette Field; Norfolk, VA	W 16–0		
November 12	3:30 p.m.	Bucknell	Georgetown Field; Washington, DC	W 12–0		
November 19		vs. George Washington	National Park; Washington, DC	W 62–0		

== Players ==
=== Line ===
Player	Position
Kangaroo Carroll	tackle
Alston Cockrell	end
Percy Given	center
Raoul Lemat	guard
Harry Lux	end
Matt Mahoney	guard
Charley McGuire	center
Ed Monahan	tackle
Ike Morris	end
Tom Neill	guard
Bill O'Connell	center
Jim Orme	guard
Ed Sutton	end
Cliff Woods	guard

=== Backfield ===
Player	Position
Ray Abbatichio	halfback
Branch Bocock	quarterback
John Dougherty	halfback
Leo Fitzpatrick	halfback
Bill Graham	fullback
Hub Hart	halfback
Reynolds Hayden	fullback
Tom Kirby	quarterback
Bunny Larkin	halfback
Doc Martel	fullback
Charley McCarthy	halfback
Ferd McGettigan	quarterback
Jim McLoughlin	halfback
John Richmond	halfback
