= 1904 Virginia Orange and Blue football team =

American college football season

1904 Virginia Orange and Blue football
- Conference: Independent
- Record: 6–3
- Head coach: George Sanford (1st season)
- Captain: Walter Council
- Home stadium: Madison Hall Field

1904 Southern college football independents records
	Conf.			Overall
Team	W	L	T	W		L		T
Georgetown		–		7	–	1	–	0
Southwest Texas State		–		5	–	1	–	0
Southwestern Louisiana Industrial		–		2	–	0	–	1
Davidson		–		6	–	1	–	1
Navy		–		7	–	2	–	1
North Carolina		–		5	–	2	–	2
Virginia		–		6	–	3	–	0
North Carolina A&M		–		3	–	1	–	2
West Virginia		–		6	–	3	–	0
VPI		–		5	–	3	–	0
George Washington		–		4	–	2	–	2
Arkansas		–		4	–	3	–	0
Oklahoma		–		4	–	3	–	1
South Carolina		–		4	–	3	–	1
Stetson		–		2	–	2	–	0
Central Oklahoma		–		2	–	3	–	0
VMI		–		3	–	5	–	0
Kentucky University		–		3	–	4	–	0
Grant		–		2	–	3	–	0
Florida State College		–		2	–	3	–	0
Maryland		–		2	–	4	–	2
East Florida Seminary		–		1	–	2	–	0
Goldey College		–		1	–	2	–	0
Baylor		–		2	–	5	–	1
Louisiana Industrial		–		1	–	4	–	0
TCU		–		1	–	4	–	1
Delaware		–		1	–	5	–	1
Kendall		–		0	–	2	–	1
Rollins		–		0	–	1	–	0
Tusculum		–		0	–	2	–	0
Birmingham		–		0	–	3	–	0
Florida at Lake City		–		0	–	5	–	0
Oklahoma A&M		–		0	–	6	–	0
Tennessee Docs		–		0	–	7	–	0

The 1904 Virginia Orange and Blue football team represented the University of Virginia as an independent during the 1904 college football season. Led by George Sanford in his first and only season as head coach, the Orange and Blue compiled a record of 6–3.

== Schedule ==
Date	Time	Opponent	Site	Result	Attendance	Source
September 24		Randolph–Macon	Madison Hall Field; Charlottesville, VA	W 16–0		
September 28		Washington and Lee	Madison Hall Field; Charlottesville, VA	W 17–0		
October 1		at Penn	Franklin Field; Philadelphia, PA	L 0–24		
October 15		North Carolina A&M	Madison Hall Field; Charlottesville, VA	W 5–0		
October 22		VMI	Madison Hall Field; Charlottesville, VA	W 17–0		
October 29	2:30 p.m.	vs. Carlisle	Lafayette Field; Norfolk, VA	L 6–14	6,000	
November 5		vs. VPI	Broad Street Park; Richmond, VA (rivalry)	W 5–0	3,000	
November 12		Navy	Madison Hall Field; Charlottesville, VA	L 0–5		
November 24	2:00 p.m.	North Carolina	Broad Street Park; Richmond, VA (rivalry)	W 12–11	15,000	
