= 1904 North Carolina A&M Aggies football team =

American college football season

1904 North Carolina A&M Aggies football
- Conference: Independent
- Record: 3–1–2
- Head coach: Willis Kienholz (1st season)

1904 Southern college football independents records
	Conf.			Overall
Team	W	L	T	W		L		T
Georgetown		–		7	–	1	–	0
Southwest Texas State		–		5	–	1	–	0
Southwestern Louisiana Industrial		–		2	–	0	–	1
Davidson		–		6	–	1	–	1
Navy		–		7	–	2	–	1
North Carolina		–		5	–	2	–	2
Virginia		–		6	–	3	–	0
North Carolina A&M		–		3	–	1	–	2
West Virginia		–		6	–	3	–	0
VPI		–		5	–	3	–	0
George Washington		–		4	–	2	–	2
Arkansas		–		4	–	3	–	0
Oklahoma		–		4	–	3	–	1
South Carolina		–		4	–	3	–	1
Stetson		–		2	–	2	–	0
Central Oklahoma		–		2	–	3	–	0
VMI		–		3	–	5	–	0
Kentucky University		–		3	–	4	–	0
Grant		–		2	–	3	–	0
Florida State College		–		2	–	3	–	0
Maryland		–		2	–	4	–	2
East Florida Seminary		–		1	–	2	–	0
Goldey College		–		1	–	2	–	0
Baylor		–		2	–	5	–	1
Louisiana Industrial		–		1	–	4	–	0
TCU		–		1	–	4	–	1
Delaware		–		1	–	5	–	1
Kendall		–		0	–	2	–	1
Rollins		–		0	–	1	–	0
Tusculum		–		0	–	2	–	0
Birmingham		–		0	–	3	–	0
Florida at Lake City		–		0	–	5	–	0
Oklahoma A&M		–		0	–	6	–	0
Tennessee Docs		–		0	–	7	–	0

The 1904 North Carolina A&M Aggies football team represented the North Carolina A&M Aggies of North Carolina College of Agriculture and Mechanic Arts (now known as North Carolina State University) during the 1904 college football season. They comped a record of 3–1–2 and outscored their opponents 89 to 11, with the majority of those points coming from the season-opening blowout of Guilford, 59–0. This was first and only season as head coach of the Aggies.

== Schedule ==
Date	Opponent	Site	Result	Attendance	Source
September 24	Guilford	State Fairgrounds; Raleigh, NC	W 59–0		
October 1	at VMI	Lexington, VA	W 6–0		
October 15	at Virginia	Madison Hall Field; Charlottesville, VA	L 0–5		
November 5	South Carolina	Raleigh, NC	T 0–0		
November 16	at North Carolina	Campus Athletic Field; Chapel Hill, NC (rivalry)	T 6–6	2,000	
November 24	Clemson	State Fairgrounds; Raleigh, NC (rivalry)	W 18–0		
