= 1904 Oklahoma Sooners football team =

American college football season

1904 Oklahoma Sooners football
- Conference: Independent
- Record: 4–3–1
- Head coach: Fred Ewing (1st season)
- Captain: Byron McCreary

1904 Southern college football independents records
	Conf.			Overall
Team	W	L	T	W		L		T
Georgetown		–		7	–	1	–	0
Southwest Texas State		–		5	–	1	–	0
Southwestern Louisiana Industrial		–		2	–	0	–	1
Davidson		–		6	–	1	–	1
Navy		–		7	–	2	–	1
North Carolina		–		5	–	2	–	2
Virginia		–		6	–	3	–	0
North Carolina A&M		–		3	–	1	–	2
West Virginia		–		6	–	3	–	0
VPI		–		5	–	3	–	0
George Washington		–		4	–	2	–	2
Arkansas		–		4	–	3	–	0
Oklahoma		–		4	–	3	–	1
South Carolina		–		4	–	3	–	1
Stetson		–		2	–	2	–	0
Central Oklahoma		–		2	–	3	–	0
VMI		–		3	–	5	–	0
Kentucky University		–		3	–	4	–	0
Grant		–		2	–	3	–	0
Florida State College		–		2	–	3	–	0
Maryland		–		2	–	4	–	2
East Florida Seminary		–		1	–	2	–	0
Goldey College		–		1	–	2	–	0
Baylor		–		2	–	5	–	1
Louisiana Industrial		–		1	–	4	–	0
TCU		–		1	–	4	–	1
Delaware		–		1	–	5	–	1
Kendall		–		0	–	2	–	1
Rollins		–		0	–	1	–	0
Tusculum		–		0	–	2	–	0
Birmingham		–		0	–	3	–	0
Florida at Lake City		–		0	–	5	–	0
Oklahoma A&M		–		0	–	6	–	0
Tennessee Docs		–		0	–	7	–	0

The 1904 Oklahoma Sooners football team represented the University of Oklahoma as an independent during the 1904 college football season. In their only year under head coach Fred Ewing, the Sooners compiled a 4–3–1 record, and outscored their opponents by a combined total of 204 to 96. This was the first season in which the Sooners played Oklahoma A&M in the Bedlam Series. The first meeting of the two rivals, played on November 5, is known as the infamous "Ball in the Creek Game".

== Schedule ==
Date	Time	Opponent	Site	Result	Attendance	Source
October 10		Kingfisher	Norman, Oklahoma Territory	T 0–0		
October 14	4:00 p.m.	at Pauls Valley Town Team	Pauls Valley, Oklahoma Territory	W 33–0		
October 21		Kansas	Norman, Oklahoma Territory	L 0–16		
October 31		at Lawton Town Team	Lawton, Oklahoma Territory	W 6–0		
November 5		vs. Oklahoma A&M	Island Park; Guthrie, Oklahoma Territory (rivalry)	W 75–0		
November 12		at Texas	Clark Field; Austin, TX (rivalry)	L 10–40		
November 18		Oklahoma State Military Institute	Norman, Oklahoma Territory	W 71–4		
November 24	3:00 p.m.	vs. Bethany (KS)	Colcord Park; Oklahoma City, Oklahoma Territory	L 9–36	2,000	
