= South Florida Military College =

- U.S. National Register of Historic Places
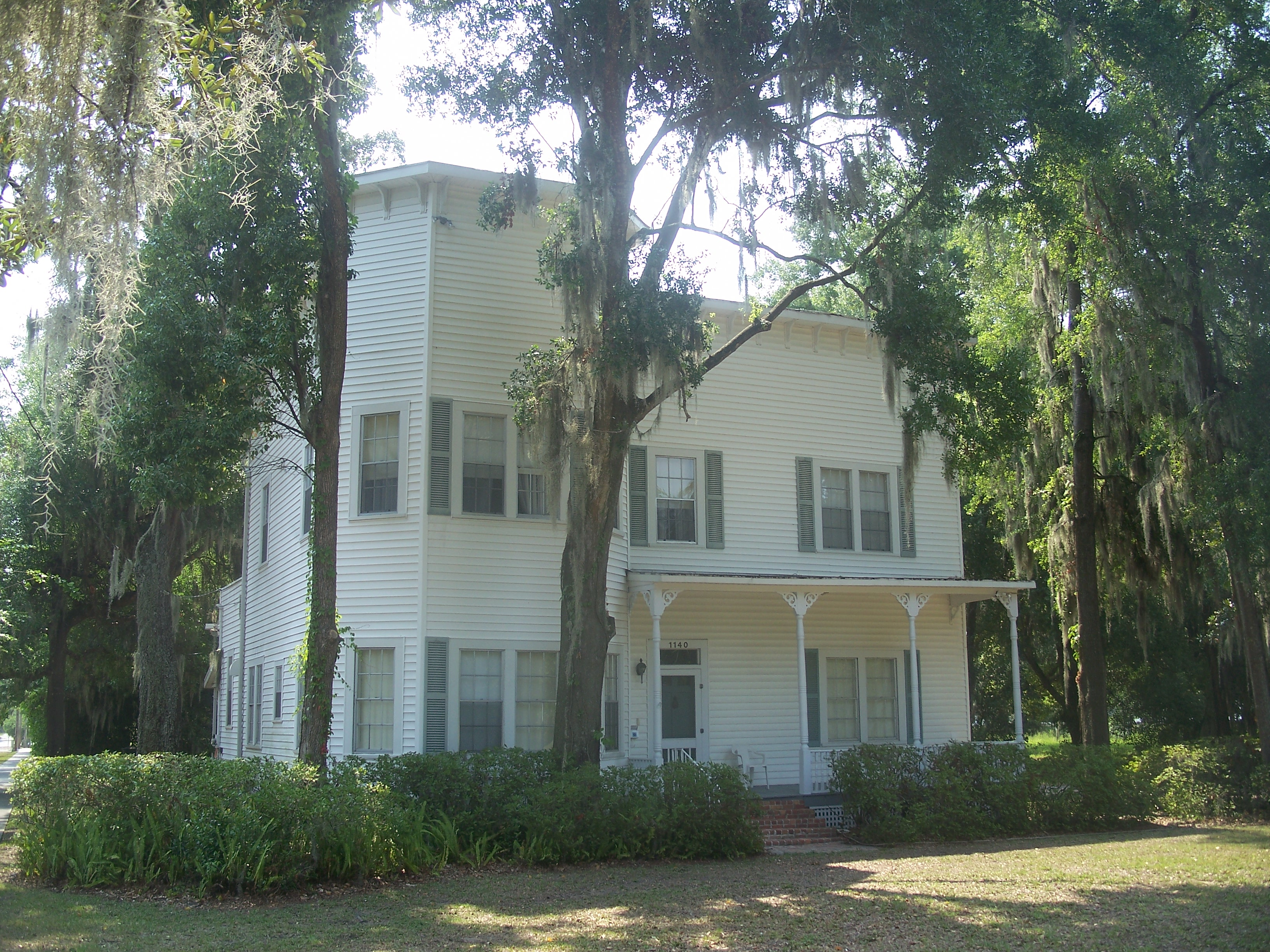

- Location within Florida Location within the United States
- Location: Bartow, Florida
- Coordinates: 27°53′09″N 81°50′33″W
- Built: 1895
- Architectural style: Frame Vernacular
- NRHP reference No.: 72000349
- Added to NRHP: July 24, 1972

The South Florida Military and Educational Institute was established in 1895 by Evander M. Law in Bartow, Florida, United States, and is considered one of several predecessors of the University of Florida.

It was renamed the South Florida Military College in 1903 and was granted the authority to confer degrees. The school stressed scientific and technological studies. The college was abolished in 1905 by the Buckman Act and some of its civil engineering equipment was transferred to the University of Florida at Gainesville. The college's remaining building is a historic site located at 1100 South Broadway which served as a dormitory, and after the college's closure as a private home. On July 24, 1972, it was added to the National Register of Historic Places.
