= 1904 VMI Keydets football team =

American college football season

1904 VMI Keydets football
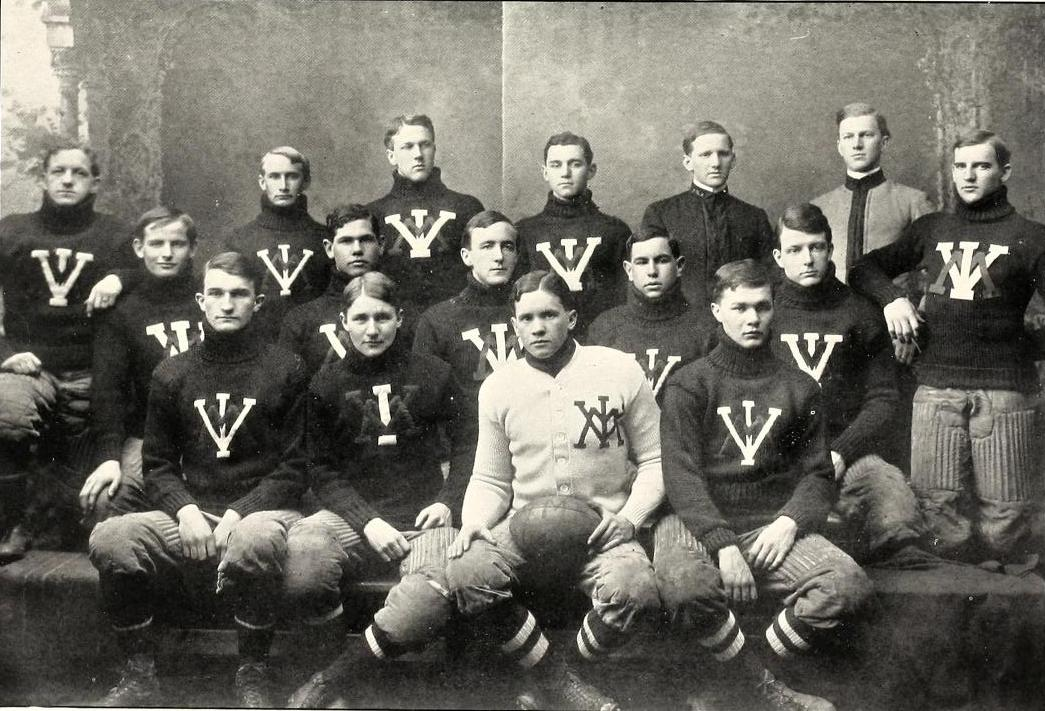
- Conference: Independent
- Record: 3–5
- Head coach: Bill Roper (2nd season)

1904 Southern college football independents records
	Conf.			Overall
Team	W	L	T	W		L		T
Georgetown		–		7	–	1	–	0
Southwest Texas State		–		5	–	1	–	0
Southwestern Louisiana Industrial		–		2	–	0	–	1
Davidson		–		6	–	1	–	1
Navy		–		7	–	2	–	1
North Carolina		–		5	–	2	–	2
Virginia		–		6	–	3	–	0
North Carolina A&M		–		3	–	1	–	2
West Virginia		–		6	–	3	–	0
VPI		–		5	–	3	–	0
George Washington		–		4	–	2	–	2
Arkansas		–		4	–	3	–	0
Oklahoma		–		4	–	3	–	1
South Carolina		–		4	–	3	–	1
Stetson		–		2	–	2	–	0
Central Oklahoma		–		2	–	3	–	0
VMI		–		3	–	5	–	0
Kentucky University		–		3	–	4	–	0
Grant		–		2	–	3	–	0
Florida State College		–		2	–	3	–	0
Maryland		–		2	–	4	–	2
East Florida Seminary		–		1	–	2	–	0
Goldey College		–		1	–	2	–	0
Baylor		–		2	–	5	–	1
Louisiana Industrial		–		1	–	4	–	0
TCU		–		1	–	4	–	1
Delaware		–		1	–	5	–	1
Kendall		–		0	–	2	–	1
Rollins		–		0	–	1	–	0
Tusculum		–		0	–	2	–	0
Birmingham		–		0	–	3	–	0
Florida at Lake City		–		0	–	5	–	0
Oklahoma A&M		–		0	–	6	–	0
Tennessee Docs		–		0	–	7	–	0

The 1904 VMI Keydets football team represented the Virginia Military Institute (VMI) in their 14th season of organized football. The Keydets compiled a 3–5 record in Bill Roper's second and last season as head coach.

== Schedule ==
Date	Time	Opponent	Site	Result	Attendance	Source
October 1		North Carolina A&M	VMI Parade Ground; Lexington, VA	L 0–6		
October 8		at Navy	Worden Field; Annapolis, MD	L 0–12		
October 10		Marine Officers	VMI Parade Ground; Lexington, VA	W 26–6		
October 15		at Virginia	Madison Hall Field; Charlottesville, VA	L 0–17		
October 22		St. John's (MD)	VMI Parade Ground; Lexington, VA	L 6–12		
November 4		Davidson	VMI Parade Ground; Lexington, VA	W 6–0		
November 12		Augusta Military Academy	VMI Parade Ground; Lexington, VA	W 27–0		
November 24	3:20pm	vs. VPI	Unknown; Roanoke, VA (rivalry)	L 5–17	3,000	
