= 1904 Central State Normal football team =

American college football season

1904 Central State Normal football
- Conference: Independent
- Record: 2–3
- Head coach: Boyd Hill (1st season)

1904 Southern college football independents records
	Conf.			Overall
Team	W	L	T	W		L		T
Georgetown		–		7	–	1	–	0
Southwest Texas State		–		5	–	1	–	0
Southwestern Louisiana Industrial		–		2	–	0	–	1
Davidson		–		6	–	1	–	1
Navy		–		7	–	2	–	1
North Carolina		–		5	–	2	–	2
Virginia		–		6	–	3	–	0
North Carolina A&M		–		3	–	1	–	2
West Virginia		–		6	–	3	–	0
VPI		–		5	–	3	–	0
George Washington		–		4	–	2	–	2
Arkansas		–		4	–	3	–	0
Oklahoma		–		4	–	3	–	1
South Carolina		–		4	–	3	–	1
Stetson		–		2	–	2	–	0
Central Oklahoma		–		2	–	3	–	0
VMI		–		3	–	5	–	0
Kentucky University		–		3	–	4	–	0
Grant		–		2	–	3	–	0
Florida State College		–		2	–	3	–	0
Maryland		–		2	–	4	–	2
East Florida Seminary		–		1	–	2	–	0
Goldey College		–		1	–	2	–	0
Baylor		–		2	–	5	–	1
Louisiana Industrial		–		1	–	4	–	0
TCU		–		1	–	4	–	1
Delaware		–		1	–	5	–	1
Kendall		–		0	–	2	–	1
Rollins		–		0	–	1	–	0
Tusculum		–		0	–	2	–	0
Birmingham		–		0	–	3	–	0
Florida at Lake City		–		0	–	5	–	0
Oklahoma A&M		–		0	–	6	–	0
Tennessee Docs		–		0	–	7	–	0

The 1904 Central State Normal football team represented Central Normal School during the 1904 college football season. The Central squad finished the season with a record of 2–3. Boyd Hill served as the program's first head coach and brought the first victory to the Central campus, a victory over Oklahoma City.

== Schedule ==
Date	Opponent	Site	Result
Unknown	Logan County High School		L 0–23
Unknown	Epworth		W 7–0
Unknown	Oklahoma Military Institute		L 0–6
	Kingfisher		L 0–5
Unknown	Oklahoma City High School		W 5–0
