= Buckman Act =

1905 Florida law

The Buckman Act was a Florida law passed by the state legislature in 1905. It reorganized the state's institutions of higher learning and created a Florida Board of Control to govern the system. The act, named for legislator Henry Holland Buckman, consolidated the state's six institutions of higher education into three: one for white men, one for white women, and one for African Americans.

Four institutions—Florida Agricultural College in Lake City (called University of Florida in 1903–1905), the East Florida Seminary in Gainesville, the St. Petersburg Normal and Industrial School in St. Petersburg, and the South Florida Military College in Bartow—were merged into the new University of the State of Florida for white men. Gainesville was chosen for the location of the new school among several competing cities, and the UF campus opened in 1906.

The Agricultural and Mechanical College for Negroes (the future Florida A&M University) in Tallahassee served African Americans, and the Florida Female College, later named the Florida State College for Women (the future Florida State University), also in Tallahassee, served white women. A fourth school in St. Augustine provided specialized training and education for the deaf and blind (the Florida School for the Deaf and Blind).

The Buckman Act was discontinued after World War II, when the GI Bill provided a college education for returning U.S. military veterans, the overwhelming majority of them male. It was replaced by a Board of Regents. Single-gender provisions of the Buckman Act at the University of Florida (UF) and the Florida State College for Women (FSCW) were officially eliminated in 1947. FSCW returned to coeducational status as Florida State University, while UF became coeducational for the first time. Florida Agricultural and Mechanical College for Negroes, the future Florida A&M University, taught both genders from its founding. Civil rights efforts and federal legislation in the early 1960s also led to all three institutions becoming racially integrated during that decade, although FAMU remains a historically black university, with over 87% of its student body African-American as of 2014.
