= 1904 Arkansas Cardinals football team =

American college football season

1904 Arkansas Cardinals football
- Conference: Independent
- Record: 4–3
- Head coach: Ancil D. Brown (1st season)
- Captain: Jess Moore
- Home stadium: The Hill

1904 Southern college football independents records
| | Conf. | | | Overall |
| Team | W | L | T | W | | L | | T |
|---|---|---|---|---|---|---|---|---|
| Georgetown | | – | | 7 | – | 1 | – | 0 |
| Southwest Texas State | | – | | 5 | – | 1 | – | 0 |
| Southwestern Louisiana Industrial | | – | | 2 | – | 0 | – | 1 |
| Davidson | | – | | 6 | – | 1 | – | 1 |
| Navy | | – | | 7 | – | 2 | – | 1 |
| North Carolina | | – | | 5 | – | 2 | – | 2 |
| Virginia | | – | | 6 | – | 3 | – | 0 |
| North Carolina A&M | | – | | 3 | – | 1 | – | 2 |
| West Virginia | | – | | 6 | – | 3 | – | 0 |
| VPI | | – | | 5 | – | 3 | – | 0 |
| George Washington | | – | | 4 | – | 2 | – | 2 |
| Arkansas | | – | | 4 | – | 3 | – | 0 |
| Oklahoma | | – | | 4 | – | 3 | – | 1 |
| South Carolina | | – | | 4 | – | 3 | – | 1 |
| Stetson | | – | | 2 | – | 2 | – | 0 |
| Central Oklahoma | | – | | 2 | – | 3 | – | 0 |
| VMI | | – | | 3 | – | 5 | – | 0 |
| Kentucky University | | – | | 3 | – | 4 | – | 0 |
| Grant | | – | | 2 | – | 3 | – | 0 |
| Florida State College | | – | | 2 | – | 3 | – | 0 |
| Maryland | | – | | 2 | – | 4 | – | 2 |
| East Florida Seminary | | – | | 1 | – | 2 | – | 0 |
| Goldey College | | – | | 1 | – | 2 | – | 0 |
| Baylor | | – | | 2 | – | 5 | – | 1 |
| Louisiana Industrial | | – | | 1 | – | 4 | – | 0 |
| TCU | | – | | 1 | – | 4 | – | 1 |
| Delaware | | – | | 1 | – | 5 | – | 1 |
| Kendall | | – | | 0 | – | 2 | – | 1 |
| Rollins | | – | | 0 | – | 1 | – | 0 |
| Tusculum | | – | | 0 | – | 2 | – | 0 |
| Birmingham | | – | | 0 | – | 3 | – | 0 |
| Florida at Lake City | | – | | 0 | – | 5 | – | 0 |
| Oklahoma A&M | | – | | 0 | – | 6 | – | 0 |
| Tennessee Docs | | – | | 0 | – | 7 | – | 0 |

The 1904 Arkansas Cardinals football team represented the University of Arkansas during the 1904 college football season. In their first season under head coach Ancil D. Brown (a former player and coach at Syracuse), the Razorbacks compiled a 4–3 record.

== Schedule ==
| Date | Opponent | Site | Result | Source |
|---|---|---|---|---|
| October 8 | Drury | The Hill; Fayetteville, AR | L 0–12 | |
| October 22 | Fort Scott High School | The Hill; Fayetteville, AR | W 22–0 | |
| October 22 | Kansas State Normal | The Hill; Fayetteville, AR | L 6–20 | |
| October 29 | at Dallas Medical | Dallas, TX | L 0–5 | |
| October 31 | at Baylor | Waco, TX | L 6–11 | |
| November 7 | Fairmount | The Hill; Fayetteville, AR | L 0–28 | |
| November 12 | Wichita State | The Hill; Fayetteville, AR | W 12–6 | |
| November 17 | at Springfield Normal | Springfield, MO | L 0–6 | |
| November 19 | at Saint Louis | Sportsman's Park; St. Louis, MO | L 0–51 | |
| November 19 | at Fort Smith High School | Fort Smith, AR | W 11–5 | |
| November 24 | Missouri Mines | The Hill; Fayetteville, AR | W 11–10 (or 0–5 loss) | |
