= 1904 Oklahoma A&M Aggies football team =

American college football season

1904 Oklahoma A&M Aggies football
- Conference: Independent
- Record: 0–6
- Head coach: None

1904 Southern college football independents records
	Conf.			Overall
Team	W	L	T	W		L		T
Georgetown		–		7	–	1	–	0
Southwest Texas State		–		5	–	1	–	0
Southwestern Louisiana Industrial		–		2	–	0	–	1
Davidson		–		6	–	1	–	1
Navy		–		7	–	2	–	1
North Carolina		–		5	–	2	–	2
Virginia		–		6	–	3	–	0
North Carolina A&M		–		3	–	1	–	2
West Virginia		–		6	–	3	–	0
VPI		–		5	–	3	–	0
George Washington		–		4	–	2	–	2
Arkansas		–		4	–	3	–	0
Oklahoma		–		4	–	3	–	1
South Carolina		–		4	–	3	–	1
Stetson		–		2	–	2	–	0
Central Oklahoma		–		2	–	3	–	0
VMI		–		3	–	5	–	0
Kentucky University		–		3	–	4	–	0
Grant		–		2	–	3	–	0
Florida State College		–		2	–	3	–	0
Maryland		–		2	–	4	–	2
East Florida Seminary		–		1	–	2	–	0
Goldey College		–		1	–	2	–	0
Baylor		–		2	–	5	–	1
Louisiana Industrial		–		1	–	4	–	0
TCU		–		1	–	4	–	1
Delaware		–		1	–	5	–	1
Kendall		–		0	–	2	–	1
Rollins		–		0	–	1	–	0
Tusculum		–		0	–	2	–	0
Birmingham		–		0	–	3	–	0
Florida at Lake City		–		0	–	5	–	0
Oklahoma A&M		–		0	–	6	–	0
Tennessee Docs		–		0	–	7	–	0

The 1904 Oklahoma A&M Aggies football team represented Oklahoma A&M College in the 1904 college football season. This was the fourth year of football at A&M and the team did not have a head coach. The Aggies played their home games in Stillwater, Oklahoma Territory. They finished the season 0–6. The Aggies did not score a point all season. This season also marked their first game against the Oklahoma Sooners, their longest tenured rival, in the Bedlam Game.

== Schedule ==
Date	Opponent	Site	Result	Source
October 3	at Tonkawa Prep	Tonkawa, Oklahoma Territory	L 0–6	
October 10	at Kingfisher	Kingfisher, Oklahoma Territory	L 0–11	
October 21	Chilocco	Stillwater, Oklahoma Territory	L 0–17	
November 5	vs. Oklahoma	Island Park; Guthrie, Oklahoma Territory (rivalry)	L 0–75	
November 12	at Chilocco		L 0–23	
November 24	at Logan County High School	Guthrie, Oklahoma Territory	L 0–10	
