= 1904 college football season =

American college football season

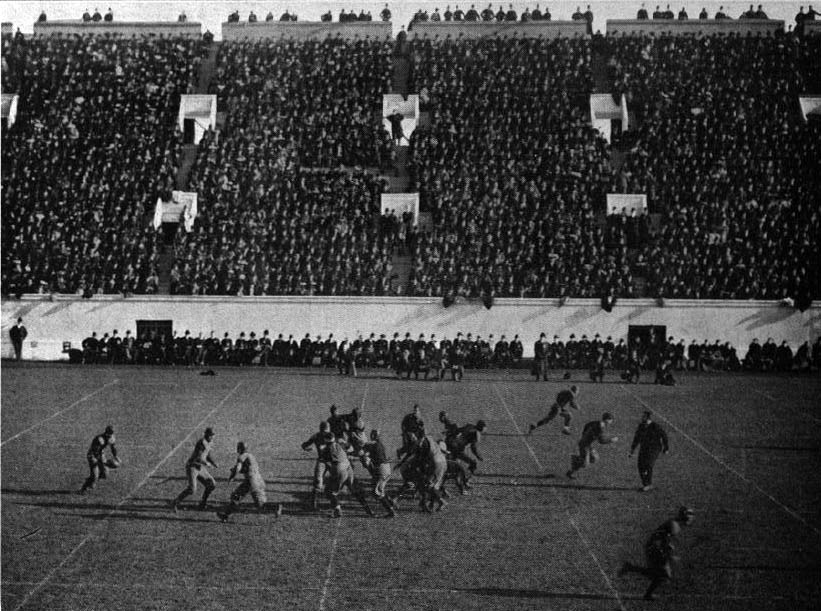
- Penn–Harvard game.
- Total No. of teams: 80
- Regular season: September 17 to December 4
- Champion(s): Michigan; Minnesota; Pennsylvania

The 1904 college football season had no clear-cut champion, with the Official NCAA Division I Football Records Book listing Michigan, Minnesota, and Penn as having been selected national champions.

1904 was a big year for the South. It was the first year for: Dan McGugin at Vanderbilt, Mike Donahue at Auburn, and John Heisman at Georgia Tech.

== Conference and program changes ==
=== Membership changes ===
School	1903 Conference	1904 Conference
Southwest Texas State Normal football	Program Established	Independent

== Conference standings ==
=== Major conference standings ===
1904 Colorado Football Association standings
	Conf.					Overall
Team	W		L		T	W		L		T
Colorado Mines $	3	–	0	–	1	3	–	0	–	1
Colorado	3	–	1	–	0	6	–	2	–	1
Denver	2	–	2	–	0	2	–	5	–	0
Colorado College	1	–	2	–	1	6	–	3	–	1
Colorado Agricultural	0	–	4	–	0	0	–	4	–	1
$ – Conference champion

1904 Southern Intercollegiate Athletic Association football standings
	Conf.					Overall
Team	W		L		T	W		L		T
Vanderbilt +	5	–	0	–	0	9	–	0	–	0
Auburn +	5	–	0	–	0	5	–	0	–	0
Sewanee	4	–	1	–	0	7	–	1	–	0
Georgia Tech	3	–	1	–	1	8	–	1	–	1
Alabama	5	–	3	–	0	7	–	3	–	0
Clemson	3	–	2	–	1	3	–	3	–	1
Tulane	3	–	2	–	0	5	–	2	–	0
Kentucky State	0	–	0	–	0	9	–	1	–	0
Ole Miss	2	–	3	–	0	4	–	3	–	0
LSU	1	–	2	–	0	3	–	4	–	0
Tennessee	1	–	4	–	1	3	–	5	–	1
Cumberland (TN)	0	–	1	–	0	2	–	1	–	0
Nashville	0	–	4	–	1	2	–	5	–	1
Georgia	0	–	4	–	0	1	–	5	–	0
Mississippi A&M	0	–	4	–	0	2	–	4	–	0
+ – Conference co-champions

1904 Southwestern Intercollegiate Athletic Association football standings
	Conf.					Overall
Team	W		L		T	W		L		T
Texas	5	–	0	–	0	6	–	2	–	0
Texas A&M	3	–	1	–	0	4	–	2	–	0
Oklahoma	1	–	1	–	0	4	–	3	–	1
Arkansas	0	–	1	–	0	4	–	3	–	0
Baylor	2	–	5	–	1	2	–	5	–	1
TCU	1	–	3	–	1	1	–	4	–	1
Oklahoma A&M	0	–	1	–	0	0	–	4	–	1
Trinity	0	–	1	–	0	0	–	1	–	0

1904 Western Conference football standings
	Conf.					Overall
Team	W		L		T	W		L		T
Minnesota +	3	–	0	–	0	13	–	0	–	0
Michigan +	2	–	0	–	0	10	–	0	–	0
Chicago	5	–	1	–	1	10	–	1	–	1
Illinois	3	–	1	–	1	9	–	2	–	1
Northwestern	1	–	2	–	0	8	–	2	–	0
Purdue	1	–	2	–	0	9	–	3	–	0
Iowa	0	–	3	–	0	7	–	4	–	0
Wisconsin	0	–	3	–	0	5	–	3	–	0
Indiana	0	–	3	–	0	6	–	4	–	0
+ – Conference co-champions

=== Independents ===
1904 Eastern college football independents records
	Conf.			Overall
Team	W	L	T	W		L		T
Penn		–		12	–	0	–	0
Western U. of Penn.		–		10	–	0	–	0
Dartmouth		–		7	–	0	–	1
Yale		–		10	–	1	–	0
Amherst		–		9	–	1	–	0
Colgate		–		8	–	1	–	1
Carlisle		–		10	–	2	–	0
Lafayette		–		8	–	2	–	0
Princeton		–		8	–	2	–	0
Army		–		7	–	2	–	0
Fordham		–		4	–	1	–	1
Harvard		–		7	–	2	–	1
Dickinson		–		8	–	3	–	1
Columbia		–		7	–	3	–	0
Cornell		–		7	–	3	–	0
Villanova		–		4	–	2	–	1
Syracuse		–		6	–	3	–	0
Swarthmore		–		6	–	3	–	0
Washington & Jefferson		–		5	–	3	–	1
Penn State		–		6	–	4	–	0
Temple		–		3	–	2	–	0
Brown		–		6	–	5	–	0
Bucknell		–		3	–	3	–	0
Springfield Training School		–		4	–	4	–	1
NYU		–		3	–	6	–	0
Holy Cross		–		2	–	5	–	2
Wesleyan		–		3	–	7	–	0
Geneva		–		1	–	4	–	2
Vermont		–		1	–	5	–	2
New Hampshire		–		2	–	5	–	0
Rutgers		–		1	–	6	–	2
Tufts		–		2	–	9	–	1
Lehigh		–		1	–	8	–	0
Frankin & Marshall		–		0	–	10	–	0

1904 Midwestern college football independents records
	Conf.			Overall
Team	W	L	T	W		L		T
Saint Louis		–		10	–	0	–	0
Bethany (KS)		–		7	–	0	–	0
Northern Illinois State		–		5	–	0	–	0
Cape Girardeau Normal		–		2	–	0	–	0
Haskell		–		8	–	1	–	0
Cincinnati		–		7	–	1	–	0
Butler		–		6	–	1	–	0
Doane		–		5	–	1	–	0
Kansas		–		8	–	1	–	1
DePauw		–		8	–	2	–	0
Iowa State		–		7	–	2	–	0
Ohio Northern		–		7	–	2	–	1
Michigan State Normal		–		6	–	2	–	0
Wittenberg		–		6	–	2	–	0
Marquette		–		5	–	2	–	0
Nebraska		–		7	–	3	–	0
Detroit College		–		4	–	2	–	0
South Dakota State		–		4	–	2	–	1
Notre Dame		–		5	–	3	–	0
Iowa State Normal		–		5	–	3	–	1
Western Illinois		–		6	–	4	–	0
Heidelberg		–		6	–	4	–	1
Drake		–		5	–	4	–	0
Carthage		–		0	–	0	–	2
North Dakota Agricultural		–		3	–	3	–	0
Wabash		–		4	–	4	–	0
Fairmount		–		4	–	5	–	0
Lake Forest		–		3	–	5	–	1
Ohio Medical		–		2	–	4	–	2
Washington University		–		4	–	7	–	0
Ohio		–		2	–	4	–	1
Missouri		–		3	–	6	–	0
Mount Union		–		2	–	6	–	0
Miami (OH)		–		1	–	5	–	0
Kansas State		–		1	–	6	–	0
American Medical		–		0	–	3	–	0

1904 Southern college football independents records
	Conf.			Overall
Team	W	L	T	W		L		T
Georgetown		–		7	–	1	–	0
Southwest Texas State		–		5	–	1	–	0
Southwestern Louisiana Industrial		–		2	–	0	–	1
Davidson		–		6	–	1	–	1
Navy		–		7	–	2	–	1
North Carolina		–		5	–	2	–	2
Virginia		–		6	–	3	–	0
North Carolina A&M		–		3	–	1	–	2
West Virginia		–		6	–	3	–	0
VPI		–		5	–	3	–	0
George Washington		–		4	–	2	–	2
Arkansas		–		4	–	3	–	0
Oklahoma		–		4	–	3	–	1
South Carolina		–		4	–	3	–	1
Stetson		–		2	–	2	–	0
Central Oklahoma		–		2	–	3	–	0
VMI		–		3	–	5	–	0
Kentucky University		–		3	–	4	–	0
Grant		–		2	–	3	–	0
Florida State College		–		2	–	3	–	0
Maryland		–		2	–	4	–	2
East Florida Seminary		–		1	–	2	–	0
Goldey College		–		1	–	2	–	0
Baylor		–		2	–	5	–	1
Louisiana Industrial		–		1	–	4	–	0
TCU		–		1	–	4	–	1
Delaware		–		1	–	5	–	1
Kendall		–		0	–	2	–	1
Rollins		–		0	–	1	–	0
Tusculum		–		0	–	2	–	0
Birmingham		–		0	–	3	–	0
Florida at Lake City		–		0	–	5	–	0
Oklahoma A&M		–		0	–	6	–	0
Tennessee Docs		–		0	–	7	–	0

1904 Far West college football independents records
	Conf.			Overall
Team	W	L	T	W		L		T
Utah		–		7	–	1	–	0
Stanford		–		7	–	2	–	1
California		–		6	–	1	–	1
USC		–		6	–	1	–	0
Idaho		–		2	–	1	–	0
Oregon		–		5	–	3	–	0
Tempe Normal		–		4	–	0	–	0
Wyoming		–		4	–	1	–	1
Washington		–		4	–	2	–	1
Arizona		–		3	–	1	–	2
Oregon Agricultural		–		4	–	2	–	0
Montana		–		3	–	2	–	0
Nevada State		–		3	–	3	–	0
Washington Agricultural		–		2	–	2	–	0
New Mexico A&M		–		1	–	2	–	1
Utah Agricultural		–		4	–	8	–	0

=== Minor conferences ===
Conference	Champion(s)	Record
Michigan Intercollegiate Athletic Association	Albion	5–0
Ohio Athletic Conference	Case	4–0

=== Minor conference standings ===
1904 Ohio Athletic Conference football standings
	Conf.					Overall
Team	W		L		T	W		L		T
Case $	4	–	1	–	0	7	–	2	–	0
Ohio State	2	–	1	–	0	6	–	5	–	0
Oberlin	2	–	2	–	1	4	–	2	–	1
Western Reserve	1	–	1	–	1	4	–	2	–	3
Ohio Wesleyan	2	–	2	–	0	5	–	5	–	0
Kenyon	0	–	4	–	0	3	–	5	–	1
$ – Conference champion

== Awards and honors ==
=== All-Americans ===
The consensus All-America team included:

Position	Name	Height	Weight (lbs.)	Class	Hometown	Team
QB	Vince Stevenson	5'10"	148	Jr.		Penn
QB	Foster Rockwell			Sr.	Vermont	Yale
HB	Daniel Hurley			Jr.	Charlestown, Massachusetts	Harvard
HB	Willie Heston	5'8"	190	Sr.	Grant's Pass, Oregon	Michigan
FB	Walter Eckersall	5'7"	141	So.	Chicago, Illinois	Chicago
FB	Andy Smith			Sr.	Du Bois, Pennsylvania	Penn
FB	Henry Torney			Jr.		Army
E	Tom Shevlin	5'10"	195	Jr.	Minneapolis, Minnesota	Yale
T	James Hogan	5'10"	210	Sr.		Yale
G	Frank Piekarski			Sr.	Nanticoke, Pennsylvania	Penn
G	Joseph Gilman				Exeter, New Hampshire	Dartmouth
C	Arthur Tipton			Sr.	Las Vegas, New Mexico Territory	Army
G	Ralph Kinney			Sr.		Yale
T	James Cooney			So.		Princeton
E	Fred Speik			Sr.	Stockton, California	Chicago

=== Statistical leaders ===
- Team scoring most points: Minnesota, 725 to 12.
- Rushing leader: Willie Heston, Michigan, 686
- Rushing avg. leader: Willie Heston, 12.7
- Rushing touchdowns leader: Willie Heston, 21
