= Thresher =

Thresher may refer to:

- Threshing machine (or thresher), a device that first separates the head of a stalk of grain from the straw, and then further separates the kernel from the rest of the head:

Pedal powered thresher, a low-tech threshing machine that is operated using pedals

- Thresher shark, a type of shark with a distinctly scythe-shaped tail
- USS Thresher refers to two United States Navy submarines, named after the Thresher shark:

USS Thresher (SS-200), a Tambor-class submarine that served in World War II
USS Thresher (SSN-593), the lead ship of her class of nuclear-powered attack submarines and was lost by accident on 10 April 1963

- Threshers (First Quench Retailing), a UK off-licence chain
- Rice Thresher, the undergraduate student newspaper of Rice University
- Clearwater Threshers, a minor league baseball team in the Florida State League
- Threshers (secret society), an Irish secret society in the first half of the nineteenth century
