= Thrash =

Thrash may refer to:

- Thrashing (computer science), where increasing resources are used to do a decreasing amount of work
- Thrash (surname)
- Thrash (film), a 2026 survival horror movie
- Thrash, mascot of the Atlanta Thrashers
- Thrash Rally, a top-down perspective rally racing video game developed by ADK
- A synonym for a strike (attack)

== Music ==
- Thrash metal, an extreme subgenre of heavy metal
  - Crossover thrash, a fusion of thrash metal with hardcore punk
  - Groove metal, a subgenre of heavy metal also known as post-thrash
- Thrashcore, a subgenre of hardcore punk
  - Bandana thrash, a subgenre of thrashcore
- Thrash, the nickname of British electronic musician Kris Weston
- Thrash Anthems, a 2007 compilation album released by thrash metal band Destruction
- "Thrash Unreal", a 2007 single by punk group Against Me!
- Thrash Zone, a 1989 album by the American crossover thrash band D.R.I.

== Places ==
- Thrash, West Virginia, former unincorporated community in Braxton County, West Virginia, United States

== See also ==
- Thresh (disambiguation)
