= Thresh =

Thresh may refer to:

- Threshing, in agriculture
  - Threshing machine
- A minor character in the novel The Hunger Games and its film adaptation
- Thresh (gamer), handle of esports player Dennis Fong

== See also ==
- Thrash (disambiguation)
- Thresher (disambiguation)
