= Frank M. Ridley =

American football player and physician (1883–1953)

- Born: May 1, 1883; La Grange, Georgia
- Died: January 28, 1953 (aged 69); La Grange, Georgia
- Occupation: Physician
- Football career

Profile
- Position: End

Personal information
- Listed weight: 170 lb (77 kg)

Career information
- College: Georgia (1901–1902)

Awards and highlights
- All-Southern (1902)

Frank Morris Ridley Jr. (May 1, 1883 – January 28, 1953) was an American college football player and physician.

== College football ==
Ridley was a prominent member of the Georgia Bulldogs football teams of the University of Georgia, captain of the team in 1901 and 1902.

=== 1901 ===
At year's end, Ridley was re-elected captain. He was then the youngest ever captain and the only to be elected such twice.

=== 1902 ===
After the scoreless tie with Georgia Tech, Ridley "was somewhat disgusted and declared that it was the worst game the Georgia team had ever played." Ridley was selected an All-Southern lineman along with teammates Harold Ketron and Sandy Beaver, achieving the honor in his first year at the position – moved to end from the backfield. One account of Ridley reads "Ridley's first year on the team he played this position so well that Coach Heisman named his as the All-Southern end. He is quick and active and never hesitates to tackle a man, seldom being blocked."

== Physician ==
In 1906 he graduated with honors from the old Atlanta College of Physicians and Surgeons. He specialized as a surgeon and diagnostician.

== Marriage ==
On June 6, 1906, Ridley married Sister Mabel Douglas Hood.

=== Shot ===
Ridley was once shot at the wedding of his cousin in 1907, nearly dying.
