= Frank Ridley =

Frank Ridley may refer to:

- Frank Ridley (secularist) (1897–1994), British Marxist and secularist
- Frank L. Ridley, American film and television actor
- Frank M. Ridley (1883–1953), American college football player and physician
