= Thrash (surname) =

Thrash is a surname. Notable people with the surname include:

- Ben Thrash (1897–1966), American diver
- Dox Thrash (1893–1965), American artist
- Jamari Thrash (born 2000), American football player
- James Thrash (born 1975), American football player
- Jesse Thrash (1880–1942), American football player
- Maggie Thrash, American writer
- Thomas W. Thrash Jr. (born 1951), American judge
- Tom Thrash, American college football player
- William G. Thrash (1916–2011), United States Marine Corps general
