= Bucher Industries =

Public company based in Switzerland

Bucher Industries AG
- Type: Joint-stock company
- Industry: Mechanical engineering
- Founded: 1807; 219 years ago in Niederweningen, Switzerland
- Founder: Heinrich Bucher-Weiss
- Headquarters: Niederweningen, Switzerland
- Area served: global
- Key people: Matthias Kümmerle (CEO); Stefan Scheiber (Chairman); Manuela Suter (CFO)
- Revenue: CHF 2.9 billion (2025)
- Number of employees: 13‘700 (2025)
- Website: www.bucherindustries.com/en/

Bucher Industries AG is an internationally active Swiss group of companies in the machinery industry based in Niederweningen, Switzerland. Listed on the SIX Swiss Exchange, the company generated sales of 2.9 billion Swiss francs in 2025 and employed 13,700 people. Bucher Industries is the fourth-oldest listed company in Switzerland.

== History ==
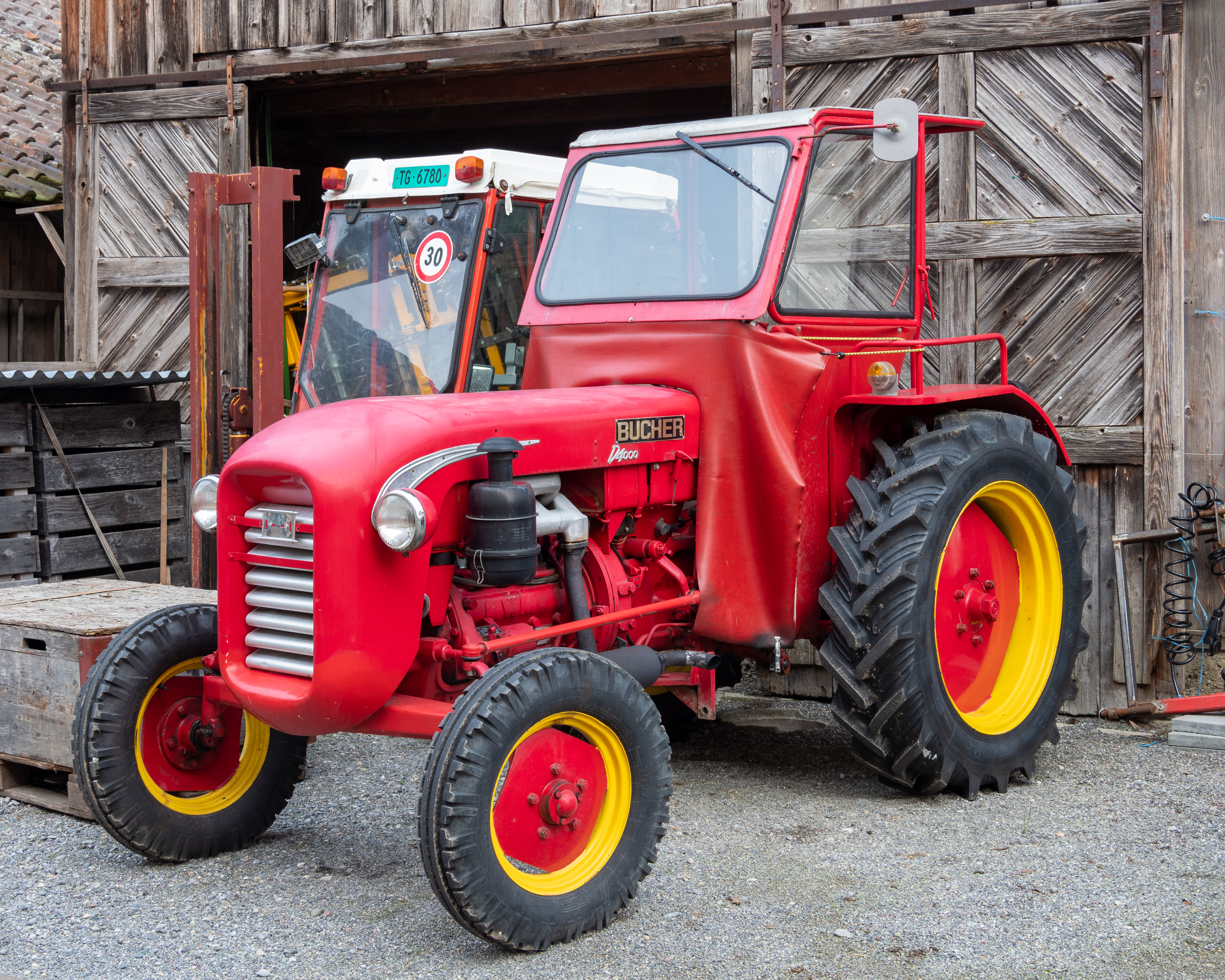
Bucher D4000 tractor from 1960

=== Founding and beginnings ===
The company was founded in 1807 when Heinrich Bucher-Weiss (1784–1850) took over a forge in Murzeln, Niederweningen. Initially, the company produced simple agricultural tools.

In the 1850s, under the leadership of the founder's son, Heinrich Bucher-Weiss, the company began producing slurry pumps, feed cutting machines, and hand mills. In 1871, Johann Bucher-Manz (1843–1919), the grandson of Heinrich Bucher-Weiss, took over the management of the forge. Under his leadership, the company started manufacturing fruit mills, fruit and grape presses, and metal components for agricultural machines such as threshers, hand mills, and feed cutters. By 1873, the company had four employees.

=== International expansion ===
In 1874, the company was registered under the name Johann Bucher, mechanische Werkstätte, Fabrikation von mechanischen Bestandteilen landwirtschaftlicher Maschinen (Johann Bucher, mechanical workshop, manufacturing of mechanical components for agricultural machines). In the late 1880s, Bucher-Manz began importing machines from abroad and reselling them in Germany to reduce costs. Bucher also began to sell agricultural machinery from foreign manufacturers. From 1890, Bucher-Manz collaborated with Johann Georg Fahr from Gottmadingen to import horse rakes from France. In 1895, the company was renamed Maschinenfabrik Johann Bucher-Manz, Niederweningen. At that time, the company had 30 employees.

The first hydraulic fruit press with a high-pressure pump was manufactured in 1901. In 1904, Jean Bucher-Guyer (1875–1961) took over the company's leadership and further advanced the production of hydraulic fruit presses. In 1923, the Maschinenfabrik Johann Bucher was established in Griessen on Lake Constance.

In the first half of the 20th century, the production of agricultural machinery, hydraulic fruit presses, and fruit mills was further expanded. In 1921, the company introduced a centrifugal slurry pump named Luna, which was easier to maintain compared to a hand piston pump, could be powered by an electric or combustion engine, and became one of Bucher's best-selling products. From 1934, Walter Hauser-Bucher (1904–1967), son-in-law of Bucher-Guyer, gradually took over the company's management, which at that time employed 230 people. In the same year, Bucher launched a team-driven mower with an auxiliary engine, whose introduction led to a significant increase in the company's sales. In 1945, Bucher presented the single-axle motor mower Rekord, which sold 116,000 units by 2003. In 1946, Bucher acquired a 50% stake in the agricultural machinery manufacturer Kuhn in Saverne, France.

In 1951, the company was transformed into a public limited company. The so-called Bucher tractors were first produced in 1954, and a total of 5,000 units were delivered by the final production year in 1964. From 1963, Bucher sold Fiat tractor. In 1967, Hans Hauser (1935–1996) and Rudolf Hauser (1937) took over the management of the company. In 1972, Thomas Hauser (1940), who had led the limited partnership Maschinenfabrik Johann Bucher since 1970 as Rudolf Hauser's successor, became a member of the board of directors. In 1975, public bonds were issued to investors for the first time.

In 1986, the majority shareholding in the grape press manufacturer CMMC SA in Chalonnes-sur-Loire, France, was acquired.

=== Acquisitions and reorganisation ===
In 1984, the Group was reorganised into Bucher Holding AG, and two years later it went public and was listed on the Swiss stock exchange. At that time, the Group generated sales of 430 million Swiss francs and had 2,730 employees.

With the initial public offering, Bucher entered a phase of expansion and acquisitions. From 1987 onwards, the subsidiary Kuhn Group expanded through the acquisition of several companies: Huard (1987), Rolba, a street sweeper manufacturer from Wetzikon (1991), and Audureau (1993). In 1994, Bucher acquired the sweeping machines, airport equipment, and special machinery divisions of Schörling GmbH & Co, integrating them into the newly founded company Bucher-Schörling GmbH. Meanwhile, in 1996, the Kuhn Group acquired Nodet. Also during the 1990s, Bucher Hydraulics expanded with the inclusion of Hidroirma S.p.a. in Reggio Emilia, Italy, Beringer Hydraulik based in Neuheim (1996), and Hydrotechnik in Frutigen (1997). Bucher ventured into glass container manufacturing with the acquisition of Swiss company Emhart Glass in 1998. Over the next years, the Kuhn Group acquired Knight Manufacturing, United States (2002), Metasa, Germany (2005), Blanchard in Chaumes-en-Retz, France (2008), the press division of Kverneland, Norway (2009), Brazilian manufacturer of self-propelled crop sprayers and fertilizer spreaders Montana Indústria de Máquinas (2014), and French manufacturer of self-propelled crop sprayers Artec Pulvérisation (2018).

In 1996, the company's core businesses were divided into five divisions: Agricultural Equipment (Kuhn Group), Vehicles (Bucher Municipal), Food Technology (Bucher Process), Hydraulic Components (Bucher Hydraulics) and Machinery (Laeis-Bucher).

Bucher Holding AG was renamed Bucher Industries AG in 2000. In 2001, Bucher Hydraulics opened a production hall at the Frutigen site, and a year later, Philip Mosimann became CEO of Bucher Industries AG, while Rudolf Hauser took over as Chairman of the Board of Directors.

In the financial year 2005, the group generated a turnover of 1.95 billion Swiss francs and employed 6,800 people. The same year, Bucher took over the European and Australian sweeper division of the British company Johnston Sweepers Ltd. One year later, the Indian company Sterling Fluid Technologies was acquired and integrated into the Bucher Hydraulics division. Further acquisitions such as Monarch Hydraulics Inc. in Michigan (2007) and Command Controls Corporation in Illinois (2008) expanded the Bucher Hydraulics division in the United States.

In September 2008, Bucher Hydraulics opened a production hall for drive and control technology at the Frutigen airport. In March 2011, the US agricultural machinery manufacturer Krause Corporation was acquired and integrated into the Kuhn Group division, which was subsequently renamed Kuhn-Krause. The same year, Bucher Emhart Glass established a joint venture with Sanjin Glass Machinery, a Chinese manufacturer of glass forming machines, acquiring 63% of the shares. In 2013, Bucher acquired a majority stake in Jetter AG, a provider of control technology, including their subsidiary Futronic GmbH.

=== Recent developments ===
Since January 2014, Bucher Industries has been organised into five divisions: Kuhn Group (agricultural machinery), Bucher Municipal (municipal vehicles), Bucher Hydraulics (hydraulic systems), Bucher Emhart Glass (glass container industry) and Bucher Specials (individual businesses).

In 2016, Jacques Sanche became CEO of Bucher Industries AG, while the previous CEO, Philip Mosimann, was appointed Chairman of the Board of Directors. Also in 2016, the Bucher Municipal division acquired the Danish manufacturer of sewer cleaners J. Hvidtved Larsen A/S (JHL). In 2018, Bucher Specials division acquired the trading business of combine harvesters and the service business for contract farmers from Swiss company Grunderco S.A. That same year, Bucher Emhart Glass division completed the acquisition of Sanjin Glass Machinery. Also in 2018, through Bucher Hydraulics division in China, Bucher entered into a joint venture to acquire 80% of the shares of Chinese manufacturer of hydraulic pumps and compact units, Wuxi Deli Fluid Technology.

In 2019, Bucher Municipal acquired 100% of the shares in Zynkon, a Chinese manufacturer of sewer cleaning vehicles. Two years later, Bucher Hydraulics acquired the mobile electric drive technology division, Lenze Mobile Drives, from Lenze Schmidhauser in Romanshorn.

In July 2023, Jetter AG and its subsidiary Futronic GmbH were merged and renamed Bucher Automation.

Since April 2026, Stefan Scheiber has been the Chairman of the Board of Bucher, replacing Urs Kaufmann. Also in April 2026, Matthias Kümmerle became CEO of Bucher Industries AG.

== Field of activity ==
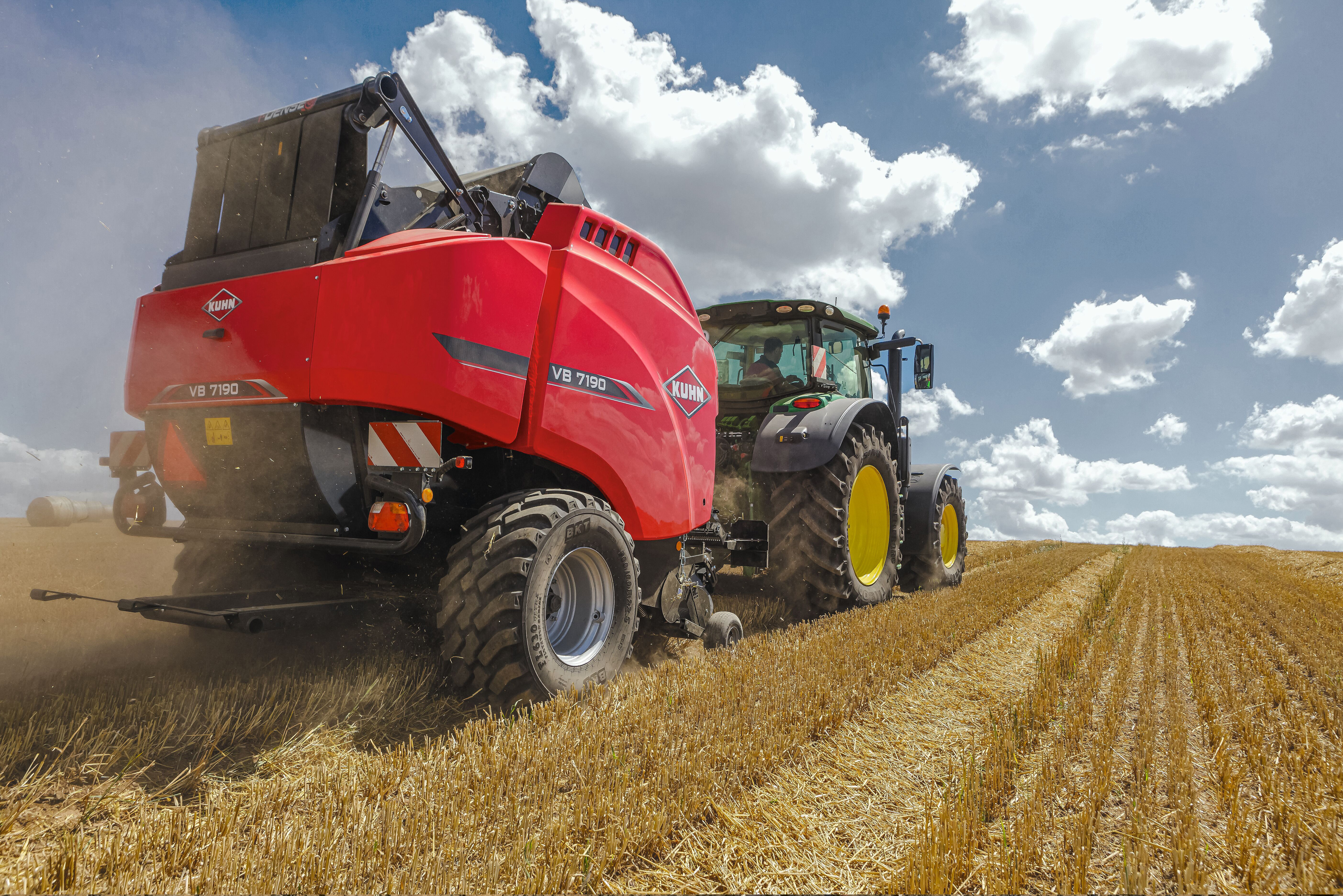
Kuhn Group - VB 7100 baler

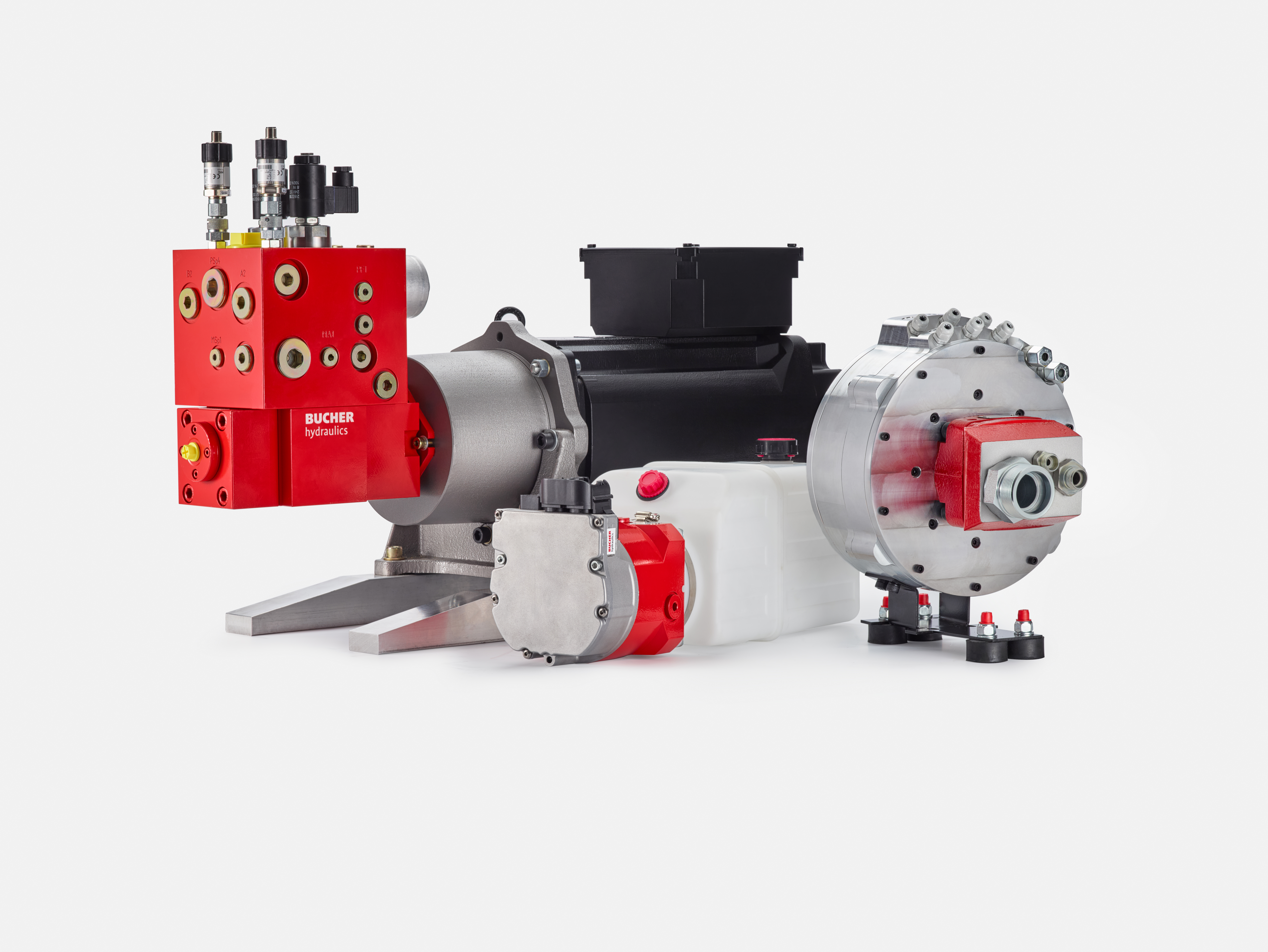
Bucher Hydraulics hydraulics systems

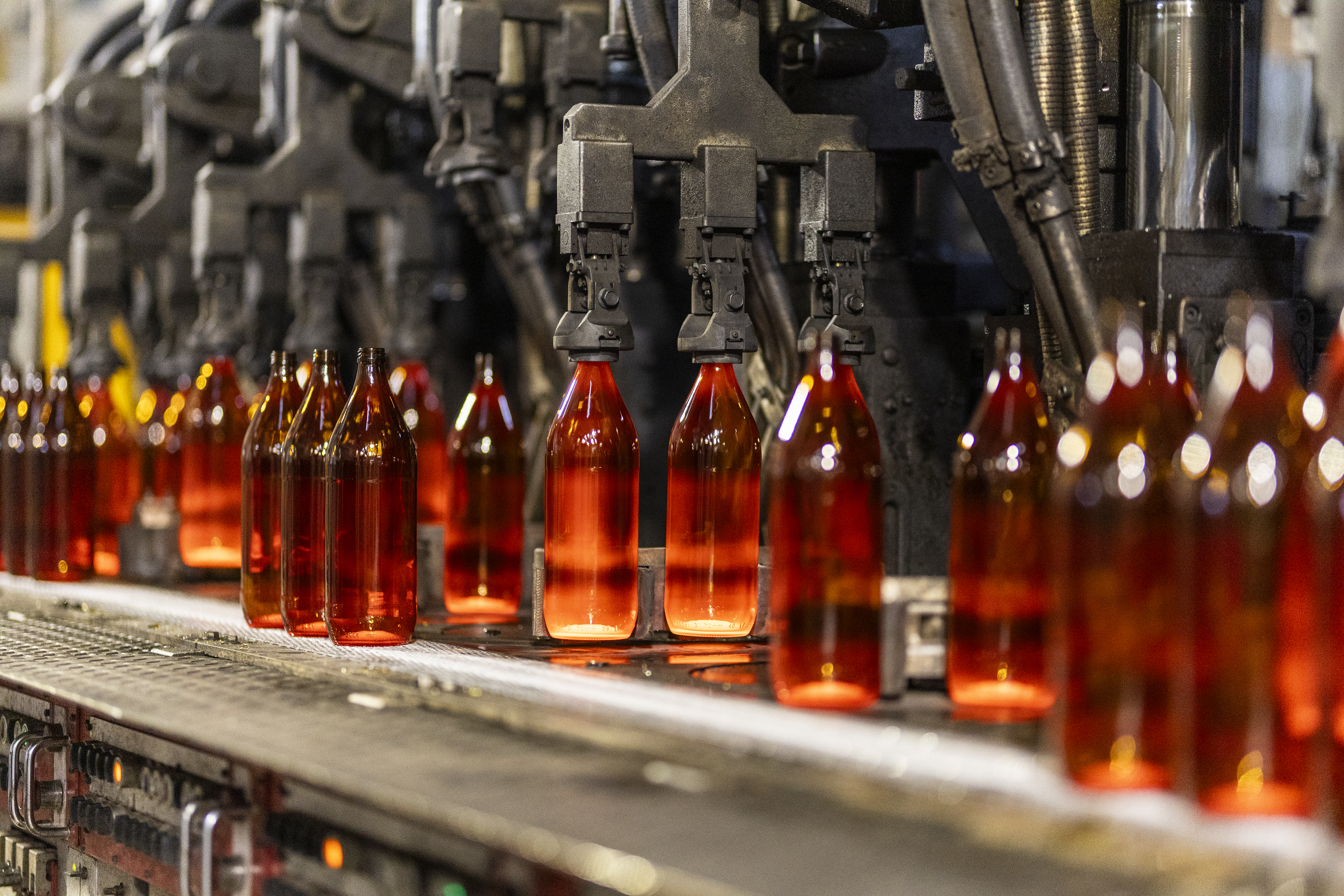
Bucher Emhart Glass -Glass forming machines

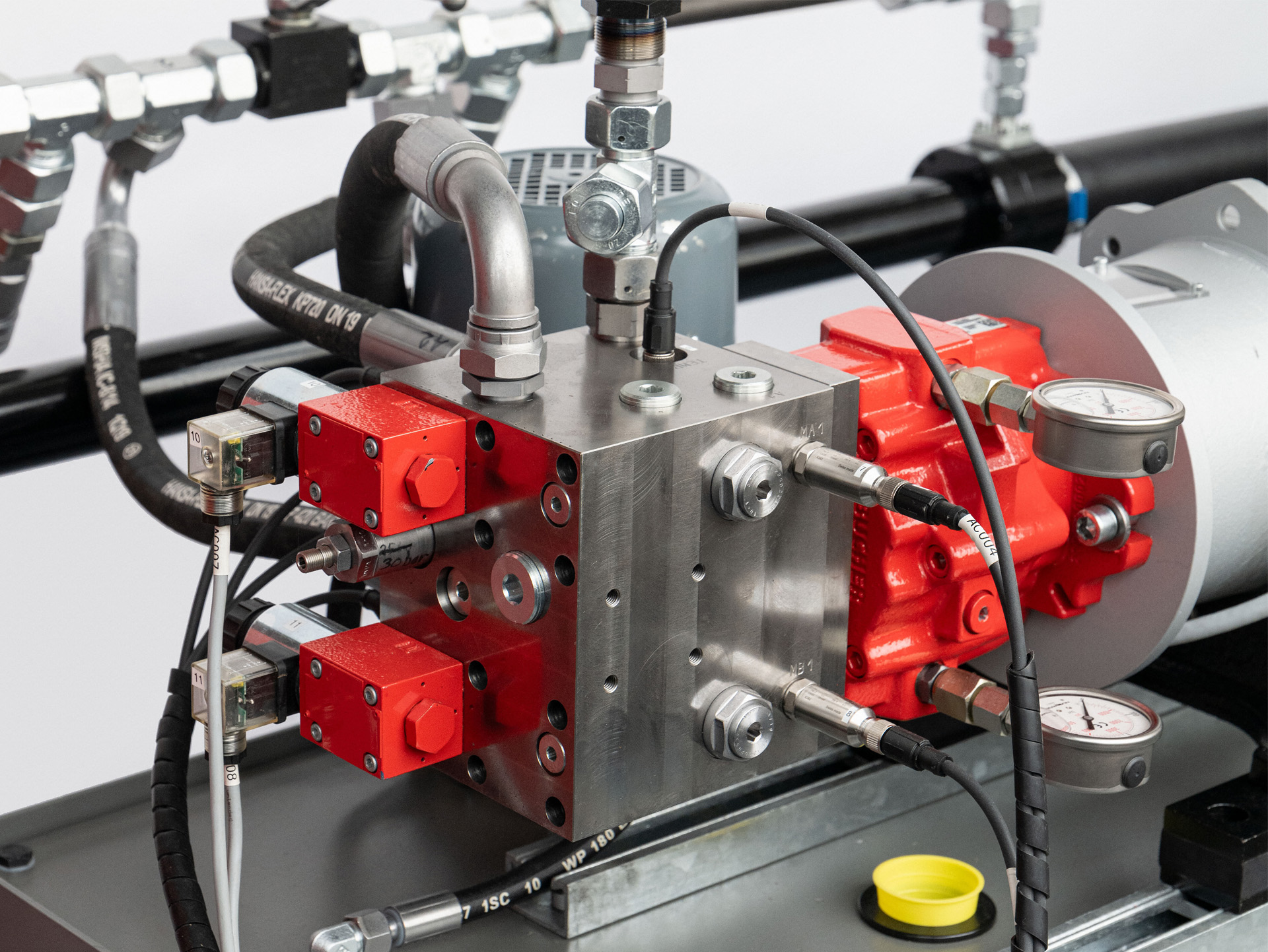
Bucher Hydraulics - Helax linear hydraulic system

The Group operates in four specialized sections in the industrially related markets of mechanical and vehicle engineering, as well as through a division with independent individual businesses:

=== Kuhn Group ===
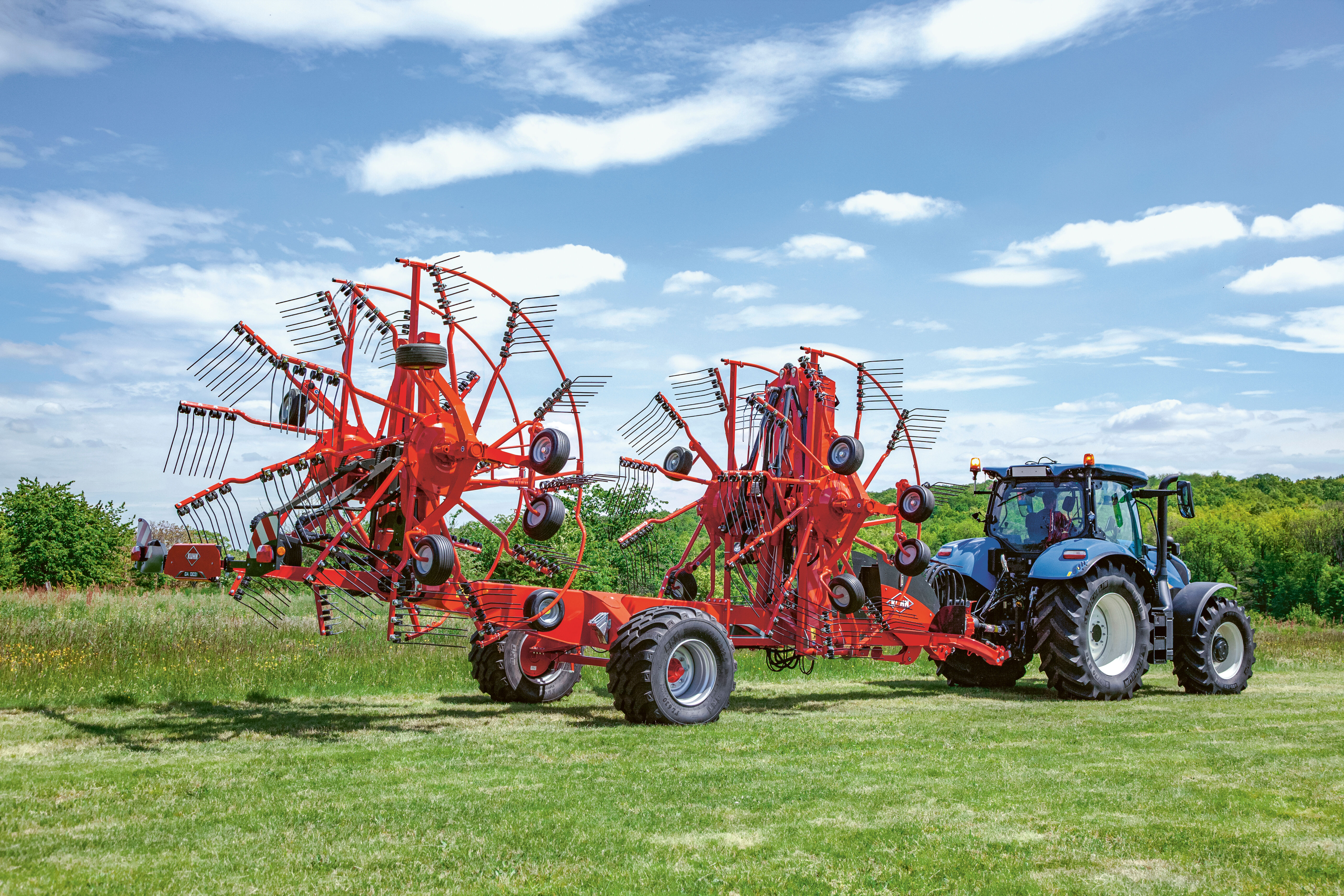
Kuhn Group -Drilling machine ESPRO 6000 RC

Kuhn Group develops, manufactures and distributes agricultural machinery for tillage, planting and seeding, nutrient management and crop protection, hay and forage harvesting, livestock bedding and feeding, as well as landscape maintenance. Kuhn Group operates manufacturing facilities in France, the Netherlands, the United States, and Brazil and is the group's largest business segment in terms of sales.

=== Bucher Municipal ===
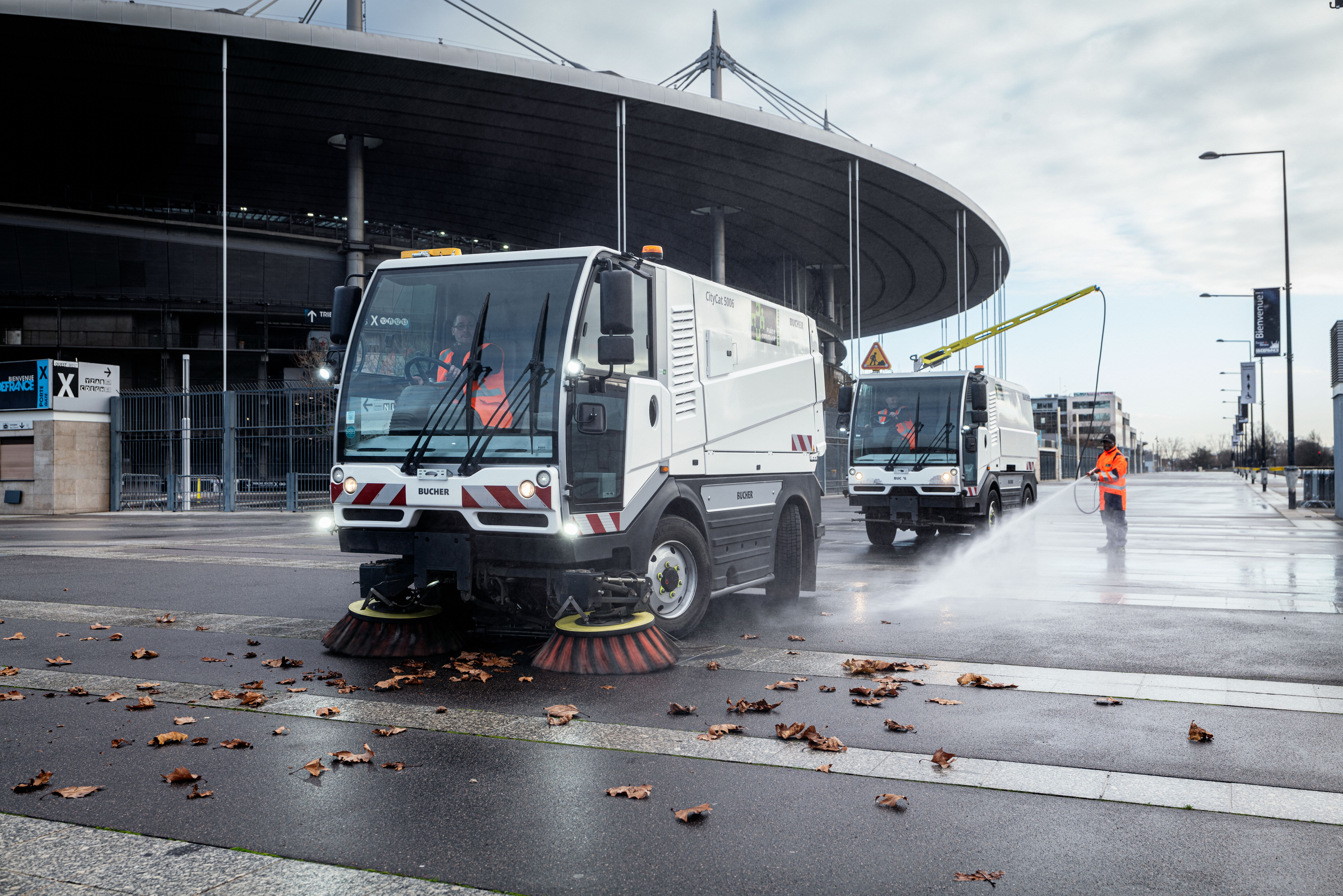
Bucher Municipal -Compact sweeper CityCat 5006

Bucher Municipal is a supplier of municipal vehicles and equipment for cleaning and clearing operations on public and private roads and other traffic areas. Their products include compact sweepers, truck-mounted sweepers and sewer cleaning, winter maintenance and refuse collection vehicles and equipment. Production facilities are located in Europe, North America, Australia, and Asia.

=== Bucher Hydraulics ===
Bucher Hydraulics develops, manufactures and sells hydraulic and electronic components. The company develops, manufactures and sells pumps, motors, valves and manifold block systems, cylinders, power units and power electronics. Production facilities are located in Europe, the United States, China and India.

=== Bucher Emhart Glass ===
Bucher Emhart Glass is a supplier of advanced technologies for manufacturing and inspection of glass containers. Their products include glass forming and inspection machines and spare parts, as well as consulting and service for the hollow glassware industry. Production facilities are located in Sweden, the United States and Malaysia. Emhart Glass is headquartered in Switzerland, with its research and development centre being located in the United States.

=== Bucher Specials ===
Bucher Specials includes independent businesses: machinery and equipment for wine production (Bucher Vaslin), for fruit juice production, dewatering of municipal or industrial sludge, and food dehydration (Bucher Unipektin), as well as the control systems engineering and process technology (Bucher Automation) business, and agricultural machinery in Switzerland (Bucher Landtechnik).

== Economic key figures ==
In addition to its headquarters in Niederweningen and Corporate Center at Zurich Airport, Bucher Industries AG is represented by 22 Group companies at around 60 locations worldwide.

In the 2025 financial year, Bucher Industries generated revenue of 2.9 billion Swiss francs and employed 14,198 people.

== Sustainability ==
In 2016, Bucher Municipal introduced the world's first fully electric compact sweeper in the 2-cubic-meter class. In 2021, the company unveiled the CityCat V20e, another electric sweeper vehicle capable of saving up to 26 tonnes of CO_{2} emissions annually compared to a diesel sweeper.

In 2020, Bucher Hydraulics launched the Helax technology, a decentralized linear drive comprising a hydraulic cylinder controlled by an electric motor, resulting in reduced energy consumption.

== Awards (selection) ==
- 2014: Best Board of Directors among 150 publicly listed companies in the Board of Directors ranking by the shareholder service provider zRating on behalf of the Swiss newspaper Finanz und Wirtschaft.
- 2015: Award for the Universal Seed Drill Espro as "Machine of the Year" in the "Sowing" category, by an international jury of agricultural machinery journalists.
- 2018: Award for the Kuhn FBP 3135 Intelli Wrap baler-wrapper as "Machine of the Year", by an international jury of agricultural machinery journalists.
- 2019: Zug Innovation Prize for the iValve lift control valve, by the Counsil of States of the canton Zug, Switzerland.
- 2023: Manuela Suter honoured as CFO of the Year in the "Swiss Performance Index" category by the CFO Forum Switzerland.
- 2023: German Innovation Award Gold for the CityCat VR50e, awarded by the German Design Council.
- 2023: Award for the Kuhn VBP 7190 baler as "Farm Machine 2023", by a jury comprising representatives from various European media.
- 2026: Award for the Kuhn GMD 15030 mower as "Farm Machine 2026", by a jury comprising representatives from various European media.
