= Ketron =

Ketron is a surname. Notable people with the surname include:

- Bill Ketron (born 1953), Tennessee politician
- Harold Ketron (1879–1946), college football player and coach

== See also ==
- Ketron Island, Washington
- Polyether ether ketone
