= James C. Elmer =

American football player (1882–1920)

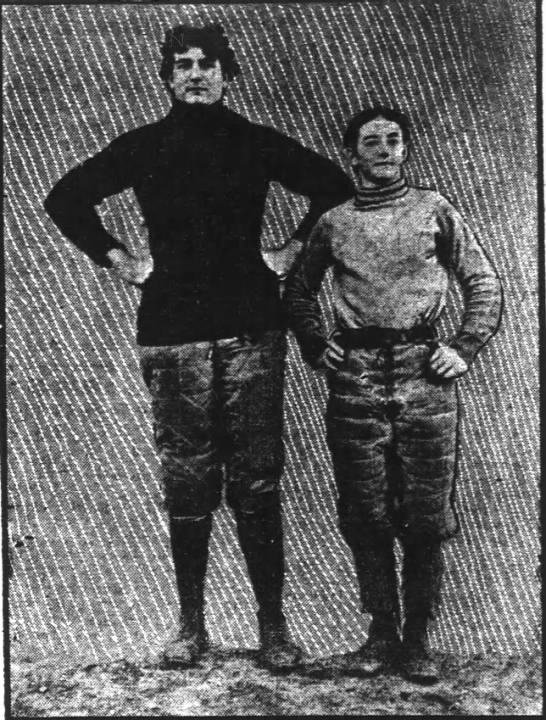
- At Auburn; the larger Elmer next to quarterback C. J. Williams

Profile
- Position: Center/Guard

Personal information
- Born: January 21, 1882; Biloxi, Mississippi, U.S.
- Died: April 30, 1920 (aged 38); New Orleans, Louisiana, U.S.
- Listed weight: 230 lb (104 kg)

Career information
- College: Auburn (1902); Virginia (1903); Ole Miss (1904–1906)

Awards and highlights
- 1st All-Southern at Auburn University; All-Southern (1902, 1906)

James Chester Elmer (January 21, 1882 – April 30, 1920) was a college football player and once sheriff of Harrison County, Mississippi.

== Auburn University ==
He was a prominent guard and center for the Auburn Tigers of Alabama Polytechnic Institute. The yearbook remarks "The student body thinks "Jimmy Bigs" Elmer is the laziest man in college. [Jimmy, when you show this to Papa, tell him that "Large bodies move slowly."]"

=== 1902 ===
He was selected All-Southern in 1902. Tradition dictates many publications list Elmer as the school's first All-Southern selection despite the success in 1899 of Arthur Feagin. A report of the 6 to 0 loss to Sewanee reads "Elmer, of Auburn, was the star of the game, his work in the line being remarkable."

== University of Virginia ==
He attended the University of Virginia for a year.

== Ole Miss ==
He continued his legal studies at the University of Mississippi.

=== 1906 ===
In the Egg Bowl of 1906, Elmer's kicking accounted for 13 points in a 29 to 5 rout. Elmer also caught the first forward pass in the history of that rivalry. He was elected All-Southern by former Tennessee player Nash Buckingham in the Memphis Commercial Appeal.
