= Hampton Lemoine =

American football player and physician (1882–1916)

Profile
- Position: Guard

Personal information
- Born: March 30, 1882; Cottonport, Louisiana, U.S.
- Died: January 24, 1916 (aged 33); Cottonport, Louisiana, U.S.

Career information
- College: Louisiana State (1899); Sewanee (1902)

Awards and highlights
- All-Southern (1902)

Hampton Theophile Lemoine (March 30, 1882 – January 24, 1916) was an American college football player and physician.

== Early life ==
Hampton Theophile Lemoine was born on March 30, 1882 to Confederate veteran Theophile Lemoine.

=== Sewanee ===
He transferred from Louisiana State University to Sewanee: The University of the South in Sewanee, Tennessee. Lemoine was a prominent guard on the Sewanee Tigers football team, selected All-Southern in 1902. He played opposite the other guard Henry D. Phillips.

== Physician ==
Lemoine was a physician; once a member of the Avoyelles Parish Medical Society. In 1906, he moved from Big Cane to Cottonport. He ran Lemoine Pharmacy by 1911. In 1912 it suffered a fire. In 1914, he moved to Plaucheville.

== Death ==
Lemoine died in Cottonport in 1916.
