= Bucher Hydraulics =

- Company type: Division of a swiss stock company
- Industry: drive and control systems
- Founded: 1923
- Headquarters: Klettgau-Griessen, Germany (Division); Niederweningen (ZH), Switzerland
- Key people: Philip Mosimann (CEO); Daniel Waller (President)
- Revenue: $445 million (2015)
- Number of employees: 2,000 (2015)
- Website: bucherhydraulics.com

Bucher Hydraulics located in Klettgau-Griessen, Germany is the internationally active hydraulic division of the Swiss conglomerate Bucher Industries, Niederweningen (ZH), a corporation listed on the SWX Swiss Stock Exchange.

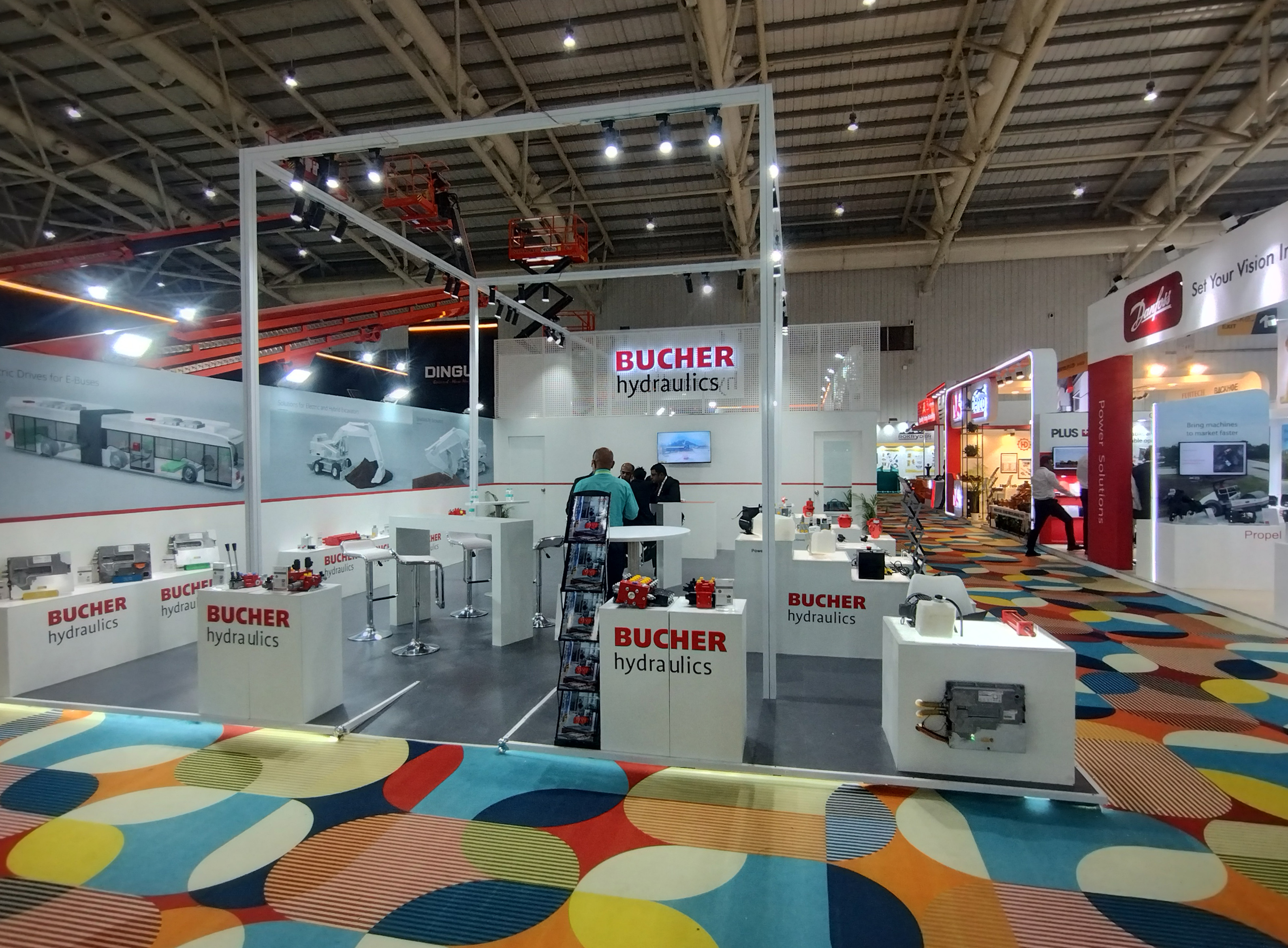
Bucher Hydraulics at EXCON 2025, BIEC

== Activities ==
Bucher Hydraulics develops and produces drive and control technology for the mobile and industrial hydraulics sector. Their range includes products for mobile and industrial hydraulics, elevator hydraulics, hydraulic drives for high-voltage switches and height-adjustable workbenches. Some of the many components produced include hydraulic pumps, hydraulic motors, valves, cylinders, power units, electronic devices and associated systems.

== History ==
The Johann Bucher Guyer Griessen machine company was founded in 1923 in Griessen, today a community in Klettgau-Griessen, Germany in the County of Waldshut. The company had already been in existence in Switzerland since 1807. In 1952 the German company was turned into a private limited partnership and later into a limited liability corporation.

From the 1970s onwards and especially from the mid-1990s the company expanded to cover foreign markets by opening production and distribution branches and by company acquisitions. Currently it maintains its own subsidiaries in France, the United Kingdom, Italy, Switzerland, Taiwan, the United States, Turkey, Brazil, China and India.

Their acquisitions include the Italian company "Hidroirma" (1994), "Beringer Hydraulik" in Neuheim, Switzerland (1996), "Hydrotechnik" in Frutigen, Switzerland and "Dingkind" in Taiwan (1997), "Truninger AG" in Solothurn, Switzerland (2000), "Monarch Hydraulics" (2007) and "Command Controls" (2008) in the United States, and "Eco Sistemas" (2013) in Brazil.

The Bucher Hydraulik corporate group was formed in 1996 with its business management in Klettgau-Grießen. Bucher Hydraulics became the company's umbrella brand name in 2001.

== See also ==
- Bucher Industries
