= USS Thrasher =

USS Thrasher may refer to:

- USS Thrasher (SS-26), which served before World War I, was renamed G-4 before she was launched.
- USS Thrasher was a civilian motorboat commissioned during World War I eventually renamed to only her hull number, SP-546.
- USS Thrasher (AMS-203), was a Bluebird-class minesweeper that served during the early Cold War.

== See also ==
- USS Thresher
