= 1902 College Football All-Southern Team =

American all-star college football team

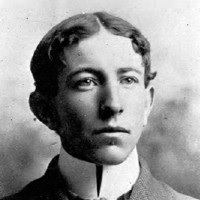
Reynolds Tichenor

The 1902 College Football All-Southern Team consists of American football players selected to the College Football All-Southern Teams selected by various organizations for the 1902 Southern Intercollegiate Athletic Association football season. Clemson won the Southern Intercollegiate Athletic Association (SIAA) championship, though Virginia was often ranked as best team in the south.

Fuzzy Woodruff's A History of Southern Football records the first All-Southern team as in 1902. Woodruff relates "The first selections that had any pretense of being backed by a judicial consideration were made by W. Reynolds Tichenor, old-time Auburn quarterback, who had kept in intimate contact with football through being a sought after official."

== Tichenor's eleven ==
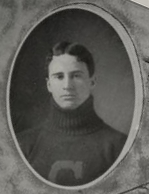
Hope Sadler

Reynolds Tichenor's eleven as posted in Fuzzy Woodruff's A History of Southern Football includes:

- Sandy Beaver, guard for Georgia. He was once head of Riverside Military Academy.
- Marvin M. Dickinson, halfback for Georgia, later coached for his alma mater.
- James C. Elmer, guard for Auburn. Tradition dictates many publications list Elmer as the school's first All-Southern selection.
- Jock Hanvey, fullback for Clemson. He started every game
- Harold Ketron, center for Georgia, known as "War Eagle." Ketron was known as quite a physical player, one source reporting he pulled hair and spat tobacco juice in faces. Another writer claims "There have been many of the old players who have followed the Georgia games long after graduation, but none of them with a record of more loyalty than the "War Eagle."'
- Joseph Lee Kirby-Smith, tackle for Sewanee, son of Edmund Kirby-Smith. He later moved to Jacksonville, Florida as a practicing dermatologist and gaining distinction throughout Florida and the south.
- John Maxwell, quarterback for Clemson. He started every game.
- Henry D. Phillips, guard for Sewanee. Sportswriter Fuzzy Woodruff called him "the greatest football player who ever sank cleated shoes into a chalk line south of the Mason-Dixon line."
- Frank Ridley, end for Georgia. One account of Ridley reads "Ridley's first year on the team he played this position so well that Coach Heisman named his as the All-Southern end. He is quick and active and never hesitates to tackle a man, seldom being blocked." He was later a physician and surgeon.
- Hope Sadler, end for Clemson. One publication reads "Vetter Sitton and Hope Sadler were the finest ends that Clemson ever had perhaps."
- Carl Sitton, end for Clemson. He also played baseball.

== All-Southerns of 1902 ==
=== Ends ===
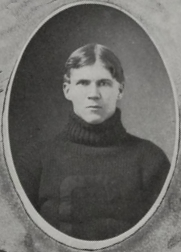
Carl Sitton

- Carl Sitton, Clemson (WRT [as hb], WA, AC, JLD-s, WAL-2)
- Frank Ridley, Georgia (WRT, WA, AC, H)
- Hope Sadler, Clemson (WRT)
- Albert Cox, North Carolina (JLD, WAL-1)
- Thomas Bronston, Virginia (JLD, WAL-1)
- Lois Thompson, Kentucky U. (JLD-s, WAL-2)

=== Tackles ===
- Joseph Lee Kirby-Smith, Sewanee (WRT, JLD-s, WAL-2)
- Nash Buckingham, Tennessee (AC)
- Jesse Thrash, Georgia Tech (AC)
- Branch Johnson, Virginia (JLD, WAL-1)
- Walter Council, Virginia (JLD, WAL-1)
- Sally Miles, VPI (JLD-s, WAL-2)
- W. B. "Bully" Young, Georgia Tech (AC-s)

=== Guards ===
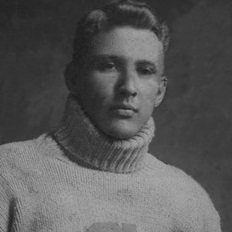
Henry D. Phillips

- Henry D. Phillips, Sewanee (College Football Hall of Fame) (WRT, AC)
- James C. Elmer, Auburn (WRT, AC-s, JLD-s, WAL-2)
- Sandy Beaver, Georgia (WRT [as t], AC-s)
- Hampton Lemoine, Sewanee (AC, JLD, WAL-1)
- Frank Foust, North Carolina (JLD, WAL-1)
- William Spates, Virginia (JLD-s)

=== Centers ===
- Harold Ketron, Georgia (WRT, WA, AC)
- Percy Given, Georgetown (JLD, WAL-1)
- Roach Stewart, North Carolina (JLD-s)
- H. Dorsey Waters, Virginia (WAL-2)

=== Quarterbacks ===
- John Maxwell, Clemson (WRT)
- Frank M. Osborne, Sewanee (WA, AC)
- John Pollard, Virginia (JLD, WAL-2)
- Louis Graves, North Carolina (JLD-s, WAL-1)
- Sax Crawford, Tennessee (AC-s)

=== Halfbacks ===
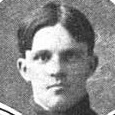
Jock Hanvey

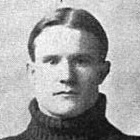
John Edgerton

- Marvin Dickinson, Georgia (WRT, AC)
- A. H. Douglas, Tennessee (AC)
- Earle Holt, North Carolina (JLD, WAL-1)
- Joe Reilly, Georgetown (JLD-s, WAL-2)
- T. Watkins, Virginia (JLD-s, WAL-2)
- James Forman, Alabama (AC-s)

=== Fullbacks ===
- Jock Hanvey, Clemson (WRT)
- John Edgerton, Vanderbilt (WA, JLD [as hb], WAL-1 [as hb])
- Hunter Carpenter, VPI (College Football Hall of Fame) (JLD, WAL-1)
- A. T. Sublett, Furman (AC)
- Frank C. Harris, Virginia (JLD-s, WAL-2)
- H. A. Allison, Auburn (AC-s)

== Key ==
Bold = Tichenor's selection

WRT = selected by W. R. Tichenor, posted in Fuzzy Woodruff's A History of Southern Football

WA = selected by W. A. Reynolds.

AC = selected by the Atlanta Constitution. It had substitutes, denoted with a small S.

JLD = selected by UVA coach John L. DeSaulles. It had substitutes, denoted with a small S.

H = selected by John Heisman.

WAL = selected by W. A. Lambeth for Collier's Weekly. It had a first and second team.
