= Corn sheller =

Machine to shell corn

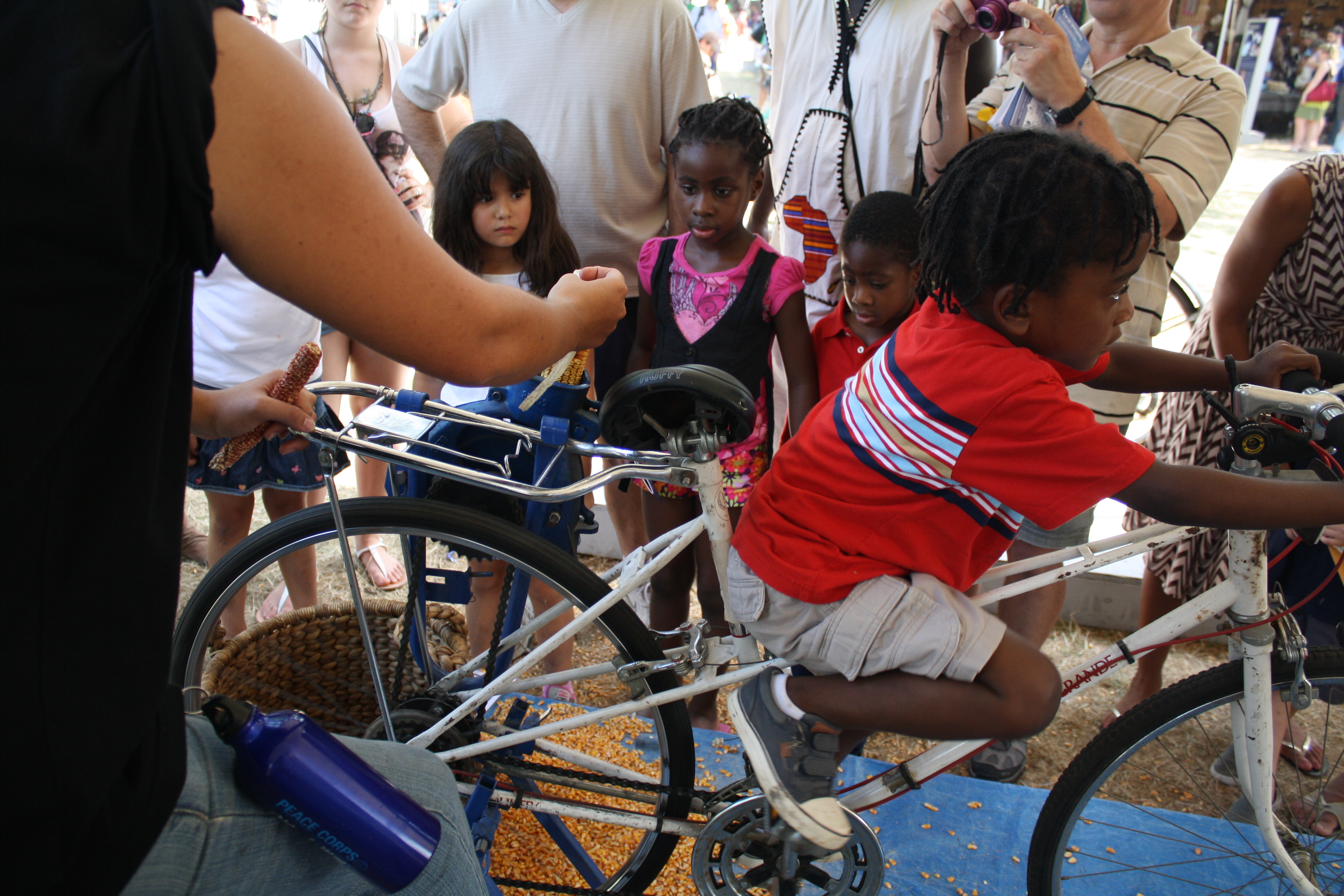
A bicycle-powered corn sheller in operation

A corn sheller is a hand-held device or a piece of machinery to shell corn kernels off the cob for feeding to livestock or for other uses.

== History ==
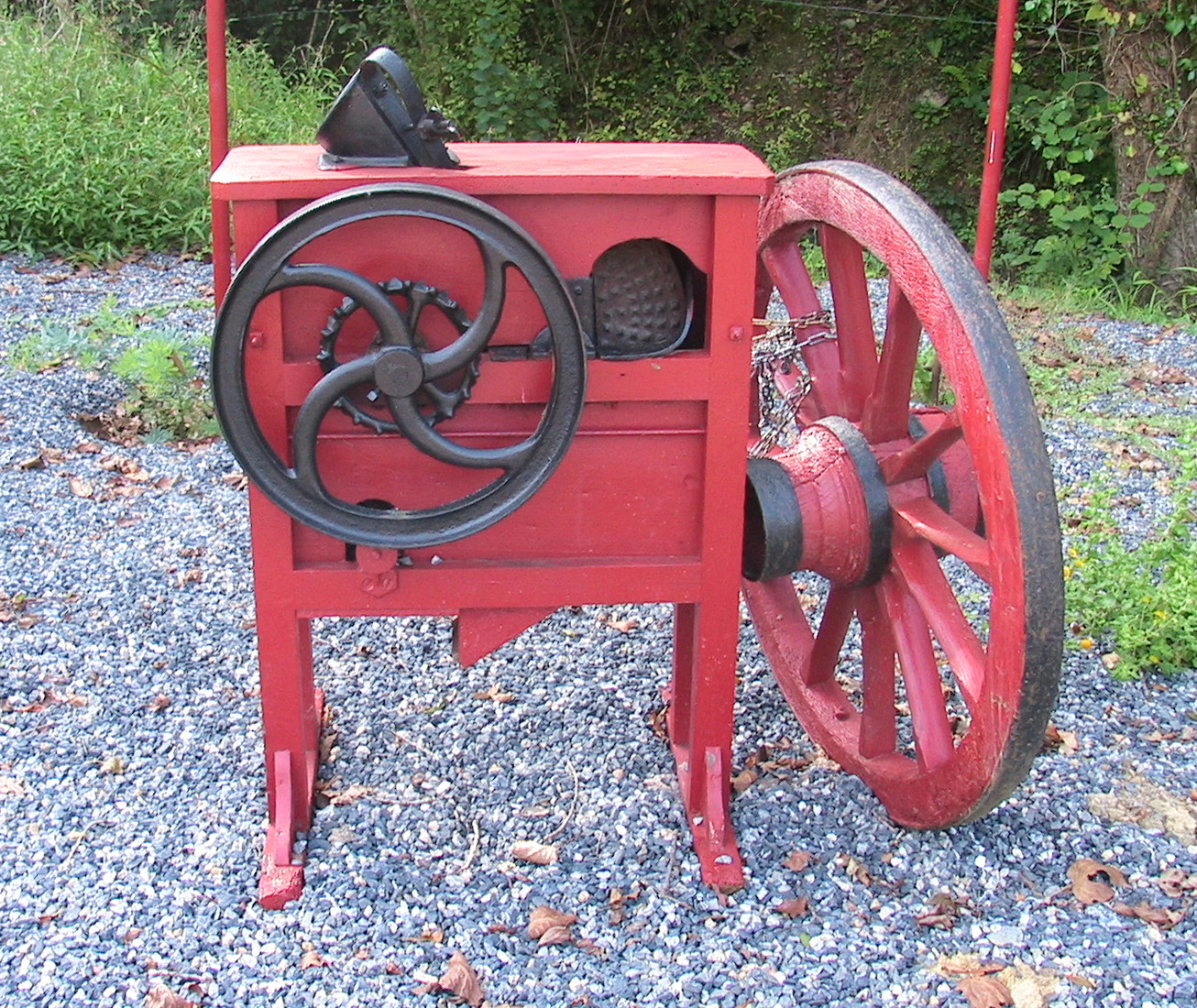
A traditional corn sheller

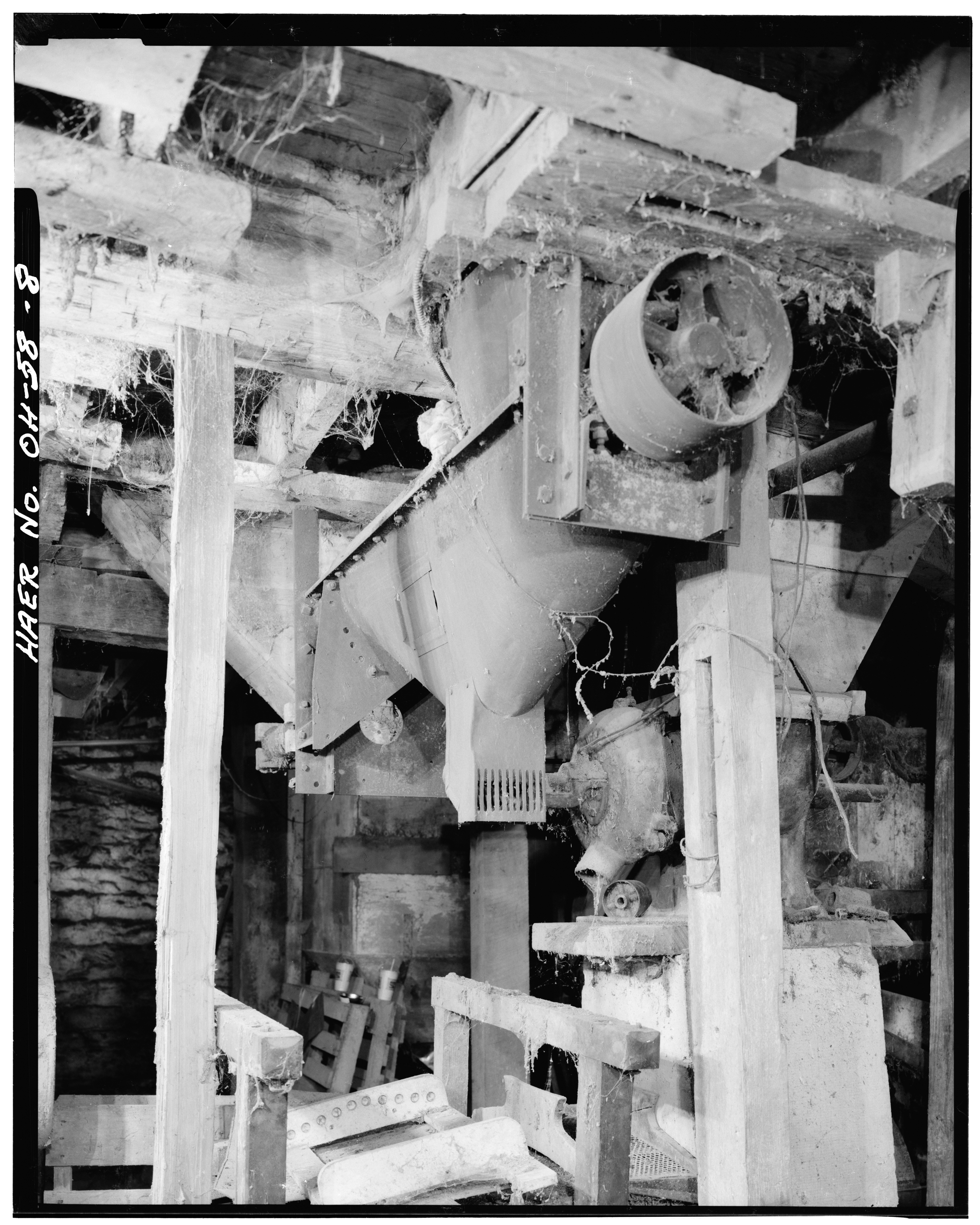
A large corn shelling machine

The modern corn sheller is commonly attributed to Lester E. Denison from Middlesex County, Connecticut. Denison was issued a patent on August 12, 1839, for a freestanding, hand-operated machine that removed individual kernels of corn by pulling the cob through a series of metal-toothed cylinders which stripped the kernels off the cob. Soon after, other patents were granted for similar machines, sometimes having improvements over Denison's original design.

== Operation ==
The operation of a corn sheller is similar to a threshing machine, but with some differences to deal with larger grain size and other differences of corn compared to wheat and other crops. Corn shellers can be powered by a hand crank, a tractor, a stationary engine, or by an electric motor. Whole corn cobs are fed in. They are pulled between two toothed wheels, usually made of metal. Each wheel spins the opposite direction of the other. The teeth pull the kernels off the cob until there are no kernels left. The kernels fall out through a screen into a container (such as a bucket) placed underneath the machine. The cob is then ejected out, since it cannot pass through the screen. Some models have a "walker", similar to a threshing machine or combine, to take the cobs out.

== Resources ==
- ISOKO Institute: Promoting Private Enterprise in Africa
