= 1903 Clemson Tigers baseball team =

American college baseball season

1903 Clemson Tigers baseball
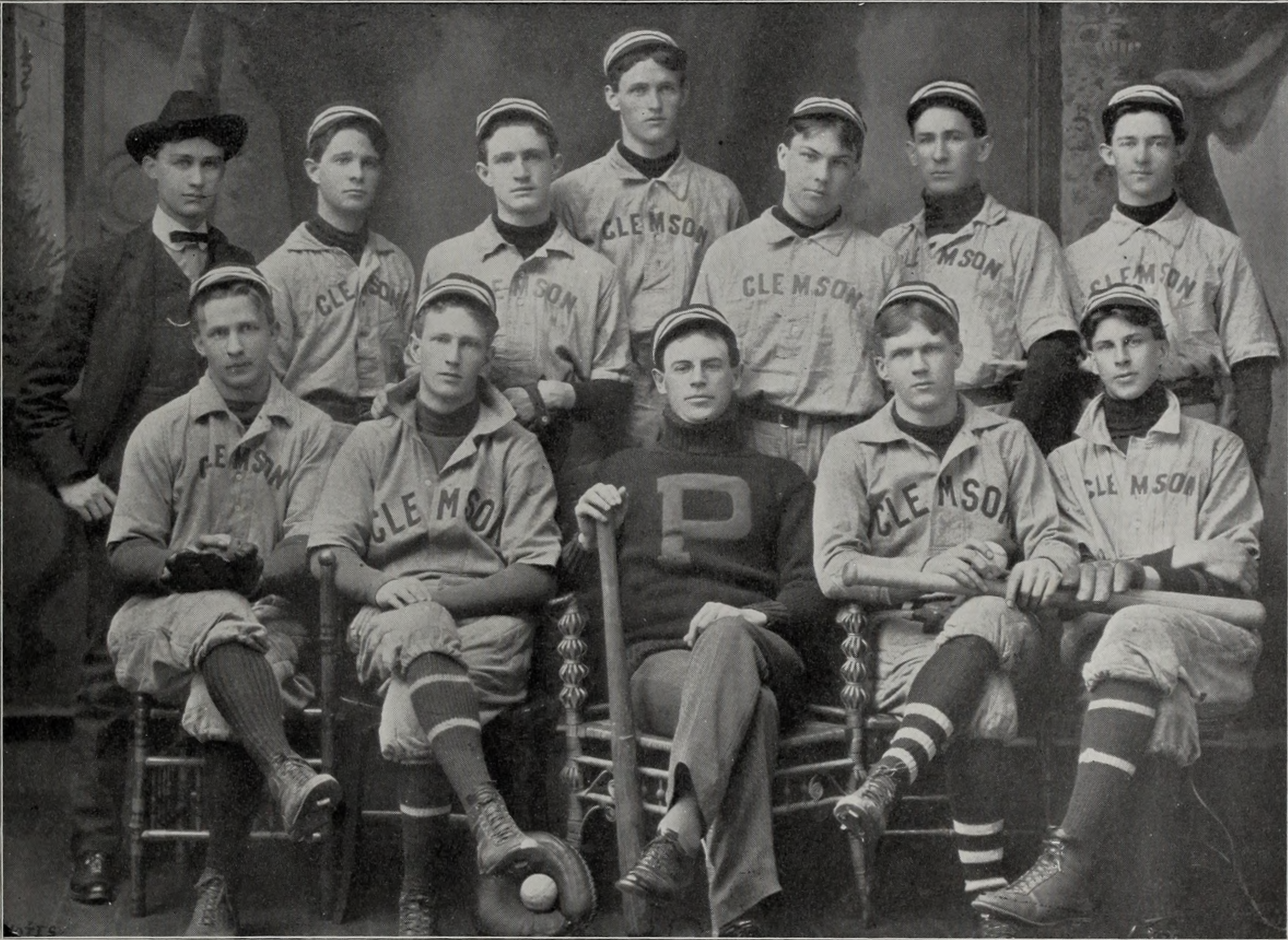
- Conference: Southern Intercollegiate Athletic Association
- Record: 9–1 (4–0 SIAA)
- Head coach: John Heisman
- Captain: Carl Sitton
- Home stadium: Bowman Field

The 1903 Clemson Tigers baseball team represented Clemson University in the 1903 college baseball season.

== Roster ==
1903 Clemson Tigers roster
Pitcher: - Carl Sitton; Catcher: - John Maxwell	Infielders: - L. S. Wood, 1B; - Caldwell, 2B; - Goggans, SS; - Rodger, 3B; Outfielders: - Chisolm, RF; - Dendy, CF; - Weir, LF	Subs: - McIver, IF; - Gil Ellison, P; - Ellis

== Schedule ==
Legend
	Clemson win
	Clemson loss
	Tie
*	Non-Conference game

1903 Clemson Tigers baseball game log
Regular season

April
Date	Opponent	Site/stadium	Score	Overall record	SIAA record
April 4	Davidson*	Bowman Field • Calhoun, SC	W 11–0	1–0	
April 10	at Georgia	Herty Field • Athens, GA	W 13–8	2–0	1–0
April 11	at Georgia Tech	Atlanta, GA	W 5–1	3–0	2–0
April 13	at Auburn	Auburn, AL	W 3–0	4–0	3–0
April 14	at Mercer	Macon, GA	W 5–3	5–0	4–0
April 18	Erskine*	Bowman Field • Calhoun, SC	L 2–5	5–1	
April 21	Wake Forest*	Bowman Field • Calhoun, SC	W 18–3	6–1	

May
Date	Opponent	Site/stadium	Score	Overall record	SIAA record
May 1	at Wofford*	Spartanburg, SC	W 10–4	7–1	
May 6	at Newberry*	Newberry, SC	W 6–5	8–1	
May 11	at Wofford*	Spartanburg, SC	W 11–1	9–1	
