= Sandy Beaver =

American athlete, football coach, and educator

- Born: October 5, 1883; Augusta, Georgia, US
- Died: December 7, 1969 (aged 86); Gainesville, Georgia, US
- Occupation: Educator
- Football career

Profile
- Position: Guard

Career information
- College: Georgia (1902)

Awards and highlights
- All-Southern (1902); RMA Sports Hall of Fame

Edgar Dunlap "Sandy" Beaver (October 5, 1883 – December 7, 1969) was a college football and baseball player, high school football coach, and educator. He was owner and director of Riverside Military Academy near Gainesville, Georgia. In 1932 he served as member of the Board of Regents of the University System of Georgia.

== University of Georgia ==
Beaver was a prominent guard for the Georgia Bulldogs of the University of Georgia.

In 1902 he was selected All-Southern. Sandy played next to All-Southern center Harold Ketron.

== Riverside Military Academy ==
Beaver served as Director of Riverside Military Academy. He held the position at Riverside for over half a century, from 1913 to 1969. At Riverside he was now known as 'Colonel' instead of Professor. Governor Eugene Talmadge appointed Beaver a brigadier general in the Georgia State Militia. He was thus often known as "General Sandy Beaver". He is a member of the school's sports Hall of Fame.

During his coaching career Beaver coached Riverside, University School For Boys (Stone Mountain), and Donald Fraser. At the University School his quarterback was Kid Woodruff.
