= Carl Sitton =

American baseball player and coach (1881–1931)

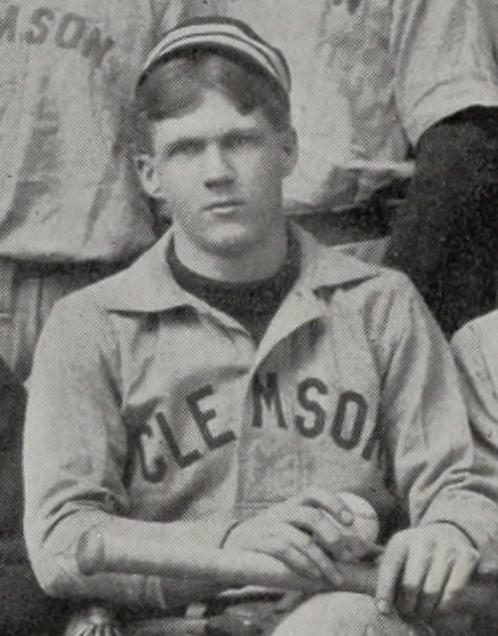
- Pitcher
- Born: September 22, 1881; Pendleton, South Carolina, U.S.
- Died: September 11, 1931 (aged 49); Valdosta, Georgia, U.S.
- Batted: Right Threw: Right

MLB debut
- April 24, 1909, for the Cleveland Naps

Last MLB appearance
- September 2, 1909, for the Cleveland Naps

MLB statistics
- Win–loss record: 3–2
- Earned run average: 2.88
- Strikeouts: 16
- Stats at Baseball Reference

Teams
- Cleveland Naps (1909)

Carl Sitton
Playing career
- 1902–1903: Clemson
- Position: End (football)

Coaching career (HC unless noted)

Baseball
- 1915-1916: Clemson

Accomplishments and honors

Championships
- SIAA (football, 1902, 1903)

Awards
- All-Southern (football, 1902, 1903)

Charles Vedder Sitton (September 22, 1881 – September 11, 1931), also known as Carl, C. V. and Vet Sitton, was an American baseball player and coach.

He attended Clemson College, where he played baseball and football for coach John Heisman. On the baseball team, Sitton was a pitcher, going 6–0 as a senior captain. On the football team, he was an end notable for end runs. He later coached baseball for Clemson.

In his second season in the minor leagues, Sitton led two teams to a regional pennant. In 1908, he pitched for the Jacksonville Jays, and won the South Atlantic League (SALLY), and then for the Nashville Vols, and won the Southern Association.

He was then the first Clemson athlete to play major-league baseball in 1909 with the Cleveland Naps before returning to the minors. He used the now-illegal spitball.

== Early life ==
Sitton was born to Henry Philip and Amy Wilkinson Sitton in Pendleton, South Carolina on September 22, 1881, the second of five children. He was named after a renowned Charleston Presbyterian minister. Known on the sports pages as Carl or C. V., his family called him Vedder. Sitton's grandfather, John B. Sitton, built the first brick building in the town square of the Old Pendleton district; his father and an uncle, Augustus, fought for the Confederacy in the American Civil War. Augustus was later prominent in the Red Shirt movement.

== Clemson ==
Sitton enrolled in Clemson College in 1901, attending through 1903 but never graduating. He played football and baseball for coach John Heisman's Clemson Tigers.

=== Football ===
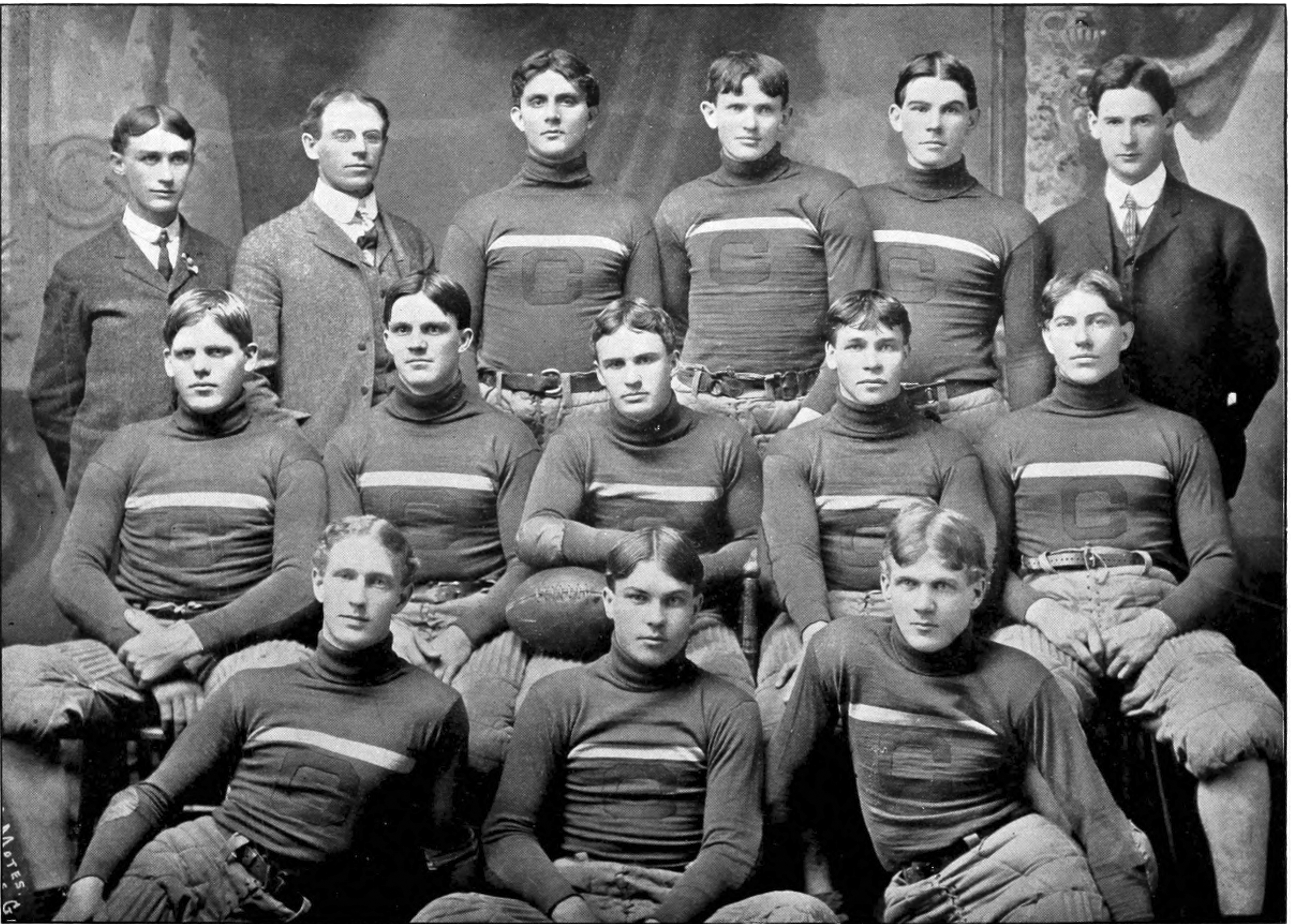
Sitton (bottom row all the way to the right) with the 1903 Clemson Tigers football team

According to one source, "Vetter Sitton and Hope Sadler were the finest ends that Clemson ever had perhaps". Sitton played on the left and Sadler on the right on Clemson's football teams. Both were All-Southern football players in 1902 and 1903. In 1915, John Heisman selected the 30 best Southern football players, and mentioned Sitton 23rd.

1902 saw a 44–5 beatdown of Georgia Tech in which Sitton scored first on an 80-yard end run. The day before the game, Clemson sent in scrubs to Atlanta, checked into a hotel, and partied until dawn. The varsity sat well rested in Lula, Georgia as those who bet on Tech were fooled.

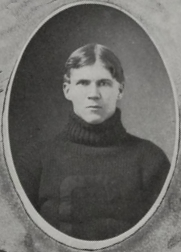
Sitton at Clemson around 1903

In 1903, Sitton was reportedly injured before the Georgia Tech contest. Tech rooters thought perhaps it was another ruse from Heisman. It was no ruse, but Sitton's substitute Gil Ellison played well enough for a 73–0 rout. (Note: Georgia awarded Clemson 44 bushels of apples, one for each point over the total posted over the Bulldogs the week previous. This game led to Tech's later job offer to Heisman.) The 24–0 win over Davidson saw one writer note "Clemson playing against eleven wooden men, would attract attention;" and Sitton had a 60-yard touchdown run.

The 1903 Tigers went on to play in the South's first conference championship game, tying Cumberland 11–11. The tying score came after Cumberland muffed a punt. Cumberland expected a trick play when Fritz Furtick simply ran up the middle for a touchdown. One account of the play reads "Heisman saw his chance to exploit a weakness in the Cumberland defense: run the ball where the ubiquitous Red Smith wasn't. So the next time Sitton started out on one of his slashing end runs, at the last second he tossed the ball back to the fullback who charges straight over center (where Smith would have been except that he was zeroing in on the elusive Sitton) and went all the way for the tying touchdown."

=== Baseball ===
He was also a starting pitcher for the baseball team, "one of the best pitchers Clemson ever had". and "one of the best twirlers in the country." According to one account, "Sitton is considered one of the best college twirlers in the south ... He is a heady pitcher, and knows just what to do in every emergency." He posted an 18–4 career record, including records of 5–2, 7–2, and 6–0 in his three years on the varsity. He was captain of the 1903 team.

== Pro baseball ==
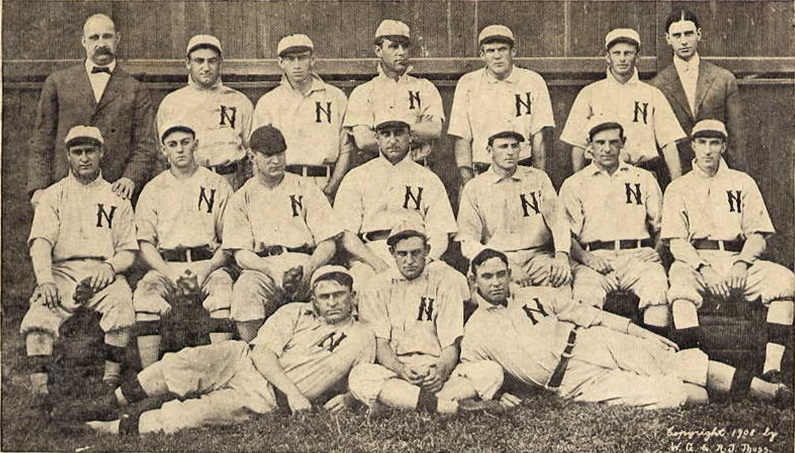
The 1908 Nashville Vols. Sitton is back row, fifth from left.

After college Sitton played baseball in a number of cities, batting and throwing right-handed. He had his pitching debut with the Jacksonville Jays, leading the team to the South Atlantic League (SALLY) championship in his second season in 1908.

=== Nashville Vols ===
Sitton was then a starting pitcher for the Southern Association champion 1908 Nashville Vols. The club, under manager Bill Bernhard, entered the final day of that season with an opportunity to win the league pennant. The championship would be decided by the last game of the season, between the Vols and the New Orleans Pelicans at Sulphur Dell. Both teams had the same number of losses (56), but the Pelicans were in first place with 76 wins to the Vols' second-place 74.

A crowd of 11,000 saw Sitton use his spitball to outpitch Ted Breitenstein for a complete-game, nine-strikeout, three-hit, 1–0 shutout, giving Nashville its third Southern Association pennant by .002 percentage points. The Nashville team and the fans mobbed the pitcher on the mound. (Note: The one run was scored with the bases loaded, Sitton on second. Ed Hurlburt scored from third and Sitton was thrown out.)

Grantland Rice called it "the greatest game ever played in Dixie". According to one account, "By one run, by one point, Nashville has won the Southern League pennant, nosing New Orleans out literally by an eyelash. Saturday's game, which was the deciding one, between Nashville and New Orleans was the greatest exhibition of the national game ever seen in the south and the finish in the league race probably sets a record in baseball history".

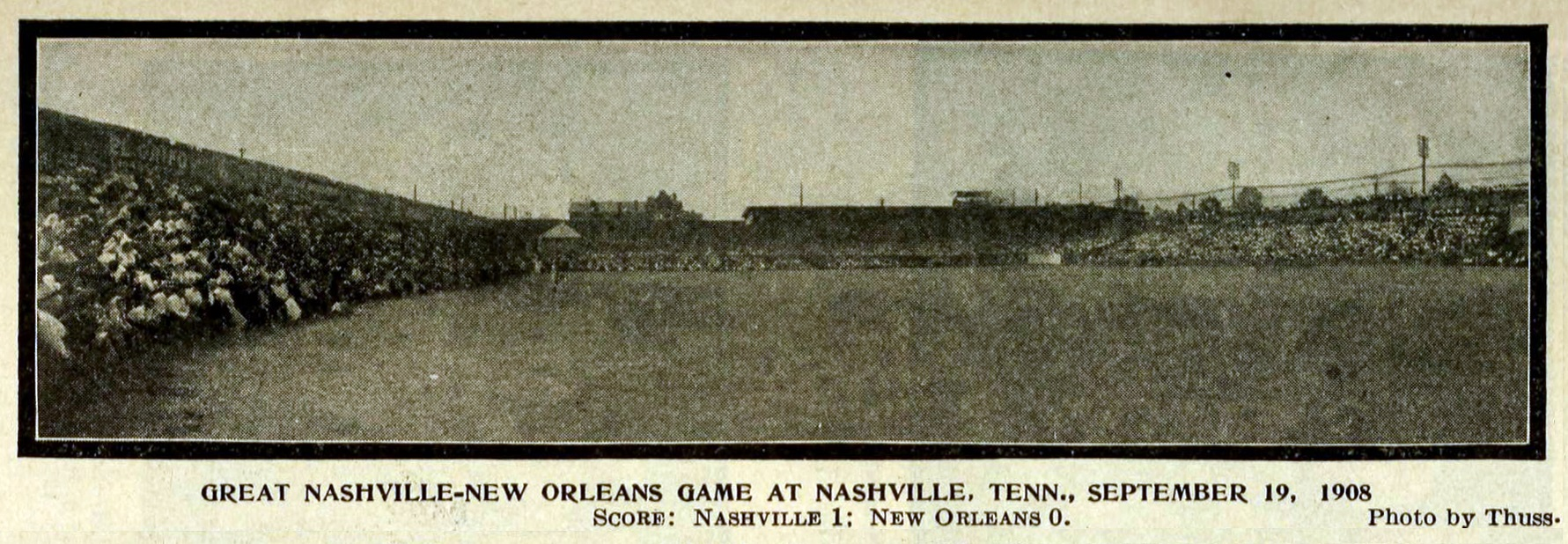
The decisive Nashville-New Orleans game

Nashville Banner sportswriters Fred Russell and George Leonard created all-time team lists of the top Nashville players from 1901 to 1919 and from 1920 to 1963. Sitton was named a pitcher on the former team.

=== Cleveland Naps ===
Sitton pitching for the Nashville Vols.

Nap Lajoie's Cleveland Naps soon lured Sitton from the Nashville club, making him the first Clemson player to play in the major leagues. Sitton was optimistic when he arrived at spring training to replace the ailing Glenn Liebhardt. He pitched well in the preseason, including a shutout against Mobile. Sitton made his major-league debut on April 24, 1909, against Rube Waddell and the St. Louis Browns, winning the game. He also won his second game, against Walter Johnson and the Washington Senators.

Although Sitton had an early 3–0 record, he was overshadowed by other pitchers on the club such as Cy Young and Addie Joss. With his high hits–to–innings ratio, he was relegated to the bullpen. Sitton played his last game in the majors on September 2, 1909, against the New York Yankees; he did not finish the game, losing 6–1.

He appeared in a total of 14 games (five as a starter), posting a 3–2 record and a 2.88 ERA. Sitton had as many hits as innings pitched and a 1:1 strikeout-to-walk ratio.

Sitton once when up to bat told umpire Tim Hurst he was going to use "three healthy swings". After striking out he told Hurst, "Well, I guess I had my three healthies". Hurst responded "That's all right young fellow, take three more; I like the breeze this hot day."

=== Return to minors ===
Sitton then returned to the minors, playing with the Montreal Royals, Atlanta Crackers, Troy Trojans, and Binghamton Bingoes.

== Clemson as coach ==
He was head baseball coach of the Clemson Tigers in 1915 and 1916. Before his hiring, Sitton was known as a frequenter of Clemson games. Sitton posted a 26–18–1 career coaching record.

== Traveling salesman ==
After 1916, Sitton's career as baseball player and coach apparently ended. He surfaced again in the 1920s as an employee of the California-based Hercules Powder Company, a former munitions firm which manufactured fertilizer. Sitton lived in the Daniel Ashley Hotel in Valdosta, Georgia at the beginning of the Great Depression, and lost his job around 1931.

== Death ==
On the morning of September 11, 1931, at age 49, Sitton borrowed a car from a Valdosta native and drove to the Lowndes County Fairgrounds. There, parked near the baseball diamond, he shot himself in the head. No motive was directly stated; his suicide was likely because he lost his job.

== Bibliography ==
- Simpson, John A. (July 23, 2007). The Greatest Game Ever Played In Dixie. McFarland. ISBN 978-0-7864-3050-5.
