= USS Thresher =

USS Thresher has been the name of more than one United States Navy ship, and may refer to:

- USS Thresher (SS-200), a submarine in commission from 1940 to 1945 and in 1946
- USS Thresher (SSN-593), a submarine commissioned in 1961 and lost in 1963

== See also ==
- USS Thrasher
