= Jesse Thrash =

American football player and engineer (1880–1942)

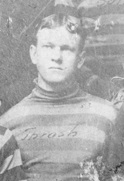
- Thrash cropped from 1902 team picture

Georgia Tech Yellow Jackets
- Position: Tackle
- Class: 1903

Personal information
- Born: October 21, 1880; Georgia, U.S.
- Died: December 12, 1942 (aged 62); Douglas, Georgia, U.S.

Career information
- College: Georgia Tech (1902–1903)

Awards and highlights
- 1st All-Southern at Georgia Tech; All-Southern (1902); Tech Athletics Hall of Fame

Jesse Little Thrash (October 21, 1880 – December 12, 1942) was a college football player and engineer.

== Georgia Tech ==
Thrash was a prominent tackle for the Georgia Tech Yellow Jackets football teams of the Georgia Institute of Technology. He was inducted into the Georgia Tech Athletics Hall of Fame posthumously in 1962.

=== 1902 ===
He was selected All-Southern in 1902, listed by various sources as Tech's first ever All-Southern football player. Despite Tech losing every game, he began the season as a sub and closed it as the undisputed star of the Tech team.

=== 1903 ===
Thrash was captain of the 1903 team.

== Personal life ==
Jesse's sons Kenneth Thrash and William G. Thrash also played football for Tech. His great niece Maria Thrash is a swimming coach, coaching the Tech swimming teams in 2003.

== See also ==
- 1902 College Football All-Southern Team
