= Thrash, West Virginia =

- Unincorporated community
- Location within West Virginia Location within the United States
- Coordinates: 38°37′45″N 80°38′24″W
- Country: United States
- State: West Virginia
- County: Braxton
- Elevation: 1,253 ft (382 m)
- Time zone: UTC-5 (Eastern (EST))
  - Summer (DST): UTC-4 (EDT)
- GNIS feature ID: 1727384

Thrash was an unincorporated community in Braxton County, West Virginia, United States. Its post office is closed.
