= William G. Thrash =

United States Marine Corps general

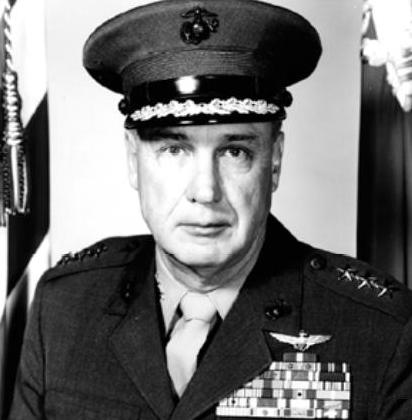
- Born: September 17, 1916; Tifton, Georgia
- Died: July 4, 2011 (aged 94); Hilton Head Island, South Carolina
- Burial place: Beaufort National Cemetery
- Military career
- Allegiance: United States of America
- Branch: United States Marine Corps
- Service years: July 14, 1939 – June 30, 1972
- Rank: Lieutenant general
- Conflicts: World War II; Korean War; Vietnam War
- Awards: Distinguished Service Medal (2); Silver Star; Legion of Merit (3); Distinguished Flying Cross; Purple Heart
- Other work: GT Construction, President

William Gay Thrash (September 17, 1916 – July 4, 2011) was a United States Marine Corps three-star general and highly decorated Naval Aviator. He retired from active duty on June 30, 1972, after more than 30 years of distinguished service.

Thrash earned the Silver Star and the Legion of Merit during the Korean War, and a Gold Star in lieu of a second Legion of Merit for exceptionally meritorious conduct as a senior United Nations officer in a Chinese Communist prisoner of war camp.

== Biography ==
=== Early years ===
William Gay Thrash was born in Tifton, Georgia, on September 17, 1916, to Jesse Thrash and Leila Gay. He graduated from Boys' High School in Atlanta, Georgia, in 1934 and earned a Bachelor of Science from the Georgia School of Technology in 1939. During his senior year, he was a member of Georgia Tech's famed football squad, the Yellow Jackets.

Thrash was commissioned a second lieutenant in the Marine Corps on July 14, 1939. He was assigned to the Basic School at the Philadelphia Navy Yard until June 1940, when he was transferred to Camp Elliott in California. He remained at Camp Elliott, serving in various assignments as an engineering officer until he was transferred to Naval Air Station Pensacola, Florida, in September 1941 for flight training.

=== World War II ===
Promoted to first lieutenant in January 1942, Thrash received his wings as a Naval Aviator on March 18 of the same year. He was promoted to captain that May, then remained an instructor at Pensacola until September 1942. Thrash joined the 1st Marine Aircraft Wing in October and was deployed overseas with the wing in November. While overseas, he was promoted to major in April 1943. Between June and September 1943, he flew over 100 combat reconnaissance missions over enemy territory in the Gilbert-Solomon Islands area, earning the Distinguished Flying Cross and five Air Medals. Returning to the United States in January 1944, he was assigned to Marine Fleet Air, West Coast, until June 1945, when he was promoted to lieutenant colonel. Following another tour of overseas duty, where he saw service at Pearl Harbor, Saipan, and Okinawa, he was assigned to the Division of Aviation at Headquarters Marine Corps in January 1946. That October, he began a two-year assignment in the Office of the Chief of Naval Operations in Washington, D.C.

In August 1948, he entered the Naval War College at Newport, Rhode Island. Upon graduation from its logistics course in May 1949, he was assigned as an instructor in the Aviation Section, Marine Corps Schools, Quantico, Virginia.

=== 1950s ===
Transferred to the 1st Marine Aircraft Wing in June 1951, Lieutenant Colonel Thrash earned the Silver Star for gallantry in action, October 25, 1951, as Tactical Officer and plane pilot in Marine Aircraft Group 12. Encountering 24 hostile jets while leading his flight of 11 Corsairs on a strike against a strategic enemy supply point, he led his flight in an aggressive attack, forcing the enemy planes to break off the engagement and retire. On reaching the target area, he succeeded in scoring direct hits, inflicting severe damage on the enemy.

While serving as tactical officer of Marine Aircraft Group 12, Thrash was engaged in a reconnaissance flight over enemy anti-aircraft positions in Korea on December 21, 1951. When his plane was struck by enemy fire, he parachuted after radioing his base that he was bailing out. Taken prisoner after landing in the heavily fortified enemy area, he remained a prisoner for almost two years.

Thrash was awarded his first Legion of Merit with Combat "V" and his sixth and seventh Air Medals before being captured and imprisoned by the Chinese Communists in December 1951. Following his repatriation in September 1953, he returned to the United States and was subsequently assigned as executive officer and, later, commander of Marine Wing Service Group 37. From May 1955 to July 1958, he was attached to the Division of Aviation, Headquarters Marine Corps, serving consecutively as assistant head and head, Plans and Readiness Branch, and deputy assistant director of aviation. While there, he was promoted to colonel in November 1955. In June 1959, he completed the National War College in Washington, D.C.

In July 1959, Colonel Thrash reported to the Marine Corps Air Station Kaneohe Bay, Hawaii, as commanding officer of Marine Aircraft Group 13. During this assignment, he led a trans-Pacific flight of Marine light attack jet aircraft in a record-making first flight from Kaneohe Bay, Hawaii, to Naval Air Station Alameda, California.

=== 1960s ===
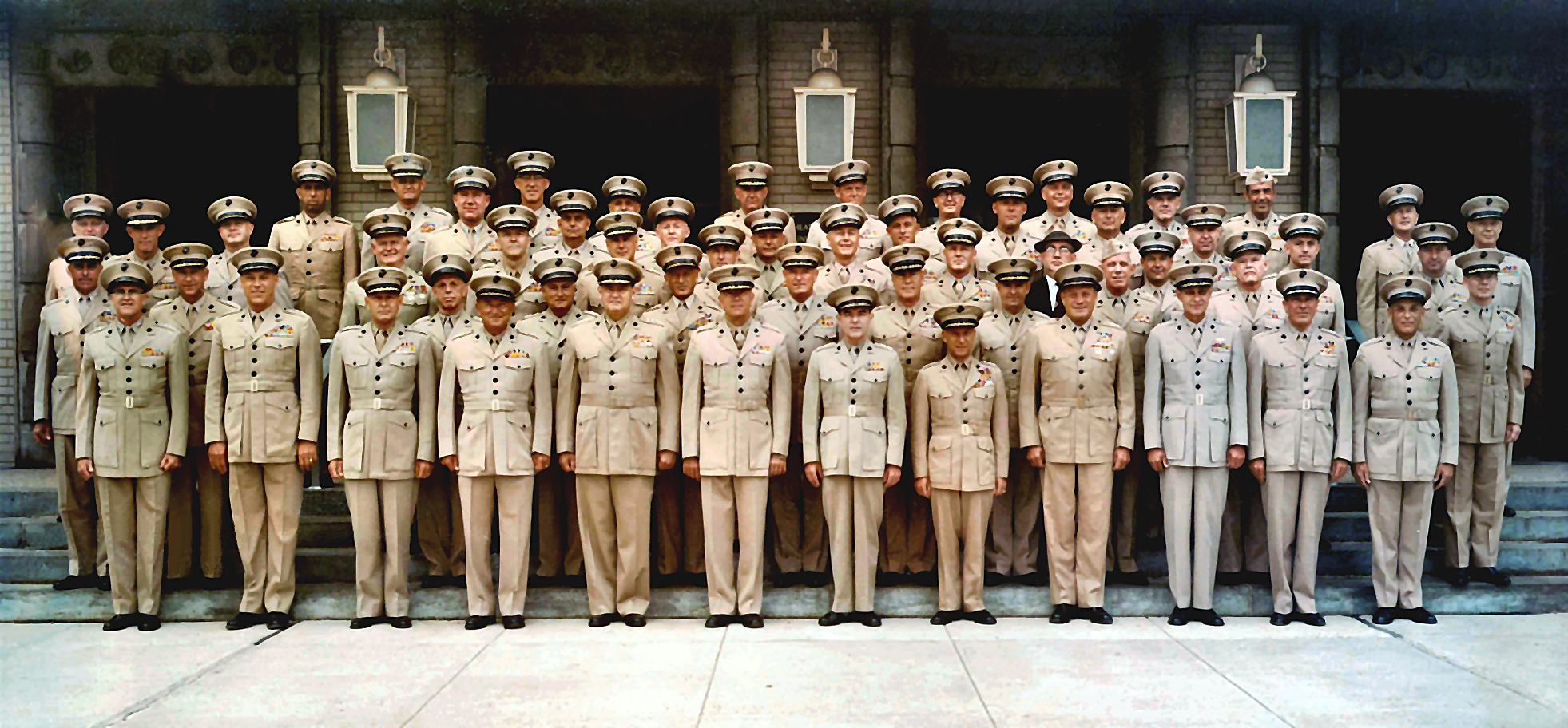
Thrash (4th from left, middle row) at the 1967 General Officers Symposium

In August 1960, he was named chief of staff of the 1st Marine Brigade at Kaneohe. He served in this capacity until May 1962, when he was deployed to Thailand as chief of staff of the 3rd Marine Expeditionary Unit. He returned from Thailand in August 1962 and assumed duty as chief of staff of the 1st Marine Aircraft Wing, Aircraft, FMF, Pacific, Iwakuni, Japan. The following June, he arrived in the United States and assumed duty at Norfolk, Virginia, as assistant chief of staff, G-3, Fleet Marine Force, Atlantic.

In March 1964, he was promoted to brigadier general and assigned as legislative assistant to the Commandant of the Marine Corps. He was awarded the Navy Commendation Medal for service during this assignment. Following his promotion to major general on January 19, 1967, he assumed duties the following month as commander, Marine Corps Air Bases, Western Area/Commanding General, Marine Corps Air Station El Toro, California and earned his third Legion of Merit.

=== Vietnam War ===
Major General Thrash was ordered to the Republic of Vietnam in July 1969 for a one-year tour of duty as commanding general, 1st Marine Aircraft Wing in the I Corps Tactical Zone, and earned the Distinguished Service Medal for his outstanding performance during this tour.

=== 1970s ===
Upon his return to the United States in July 1970, he reported to the Marine Corps Base, Quantico, for duty as deputy for education/director, Education Center, Marine Corps Development and Education Command. MajGen Thrash was nominated for promotion to three-star rank, and President Richard Nixon approved his nomination in February 1971. On March 12, 1971, his promotion was confirmed by the U.S. Senate, and he received his third star upon assignment as commanding general, Marine Corps Development and Education Command at Quantico. He served in this capacity until he retired from active duty on June 30, 1972. For exceptionally meritorious service during his last tour of duty while stationed at Quantico, he was awarded a Gold Star in lieu of a second Distinguished Service Medal.

=== Later years and death ===
Lt.Gen Thrash and his wife, the former Virginia Merryman of Atlanta, Georgia, had two sons, William Gay Jr., and Ralph Merryman Thrash, both Marine Corps officers. Lt.Gen and Mrs. Thrash resided in Newport Beach, California, then later in Hilton Head, South Carolina. He was also active in the Marine Corps Oral History Program and received a Certificate of Appreciation from the Commandant of the Marine Corps, Paul X. Kelley, in June 1986.

Thrash died on July 4, 2011, at the Hilton Head Hospital in Hilton Head Island, South Carolina.

== Awards and medals ==

Naval Aviator Badge
1st Row	Navy Distinguished Service Medal w/ 1 award star	Silver Star	Distinguished Flying Cross	Legion of Merit w/ 2 award stars & valor device
2nd Row	Purple Heart	Air Medal w/ 6 award stars	Navy and Marine Corps Commendation Medal	Navy Presidential Unit Citation
3rd Row	Marine Corps Expeditionary Medal	American Defense Service Medal	American Campaign Medal	Asiatic-Pacific Campaign Medal w/ 1 service star
4th Row	World War II Victory Medal	Navy Occupation Service Medal w/ Asia clasp	National Defense Service Medal w/ 1 service star	Korean Service Medal w/ 2 service stars
5th Row	Vietnam Service Medal w/ 1 service star	Korean Presidential Unit Citation	United Nations Korea Medal	Vietnam Campaign Medal
