= Threshers, pedal powered =

Agricultural machines

Threshing is a key part of agriculture that involves removing the seeds or grain from plants (for example rice or wheat) from the plant stalk. In the case of small farms, threshing is done by beating or crushing the grain by hand or foot, and requires a large amount of hard physical labour. A simple thresher with a crank can be used to make this work much easier for the farmer. In most cases it takes two people to work these: one person to turn the crank and the other to feed the grain through the machine. These threshers can be built using simple materials and can improve the efficiency of grain threshing. They can also be built with pedals, or be attached to a bicycle, so that the person operating it can simply pedal to reduce the work even more and make threshing faster.

Threshers can be made in a number of ways using simple tools, and can be used in the harvesting of maize/corn, rice, wheat, sorghum, pearl millet, and any other grain or seed that must be separated from a stalk. The attachment of a thresher to a pedal-system can be built with basic materials. Two versions are the pedal-powered thresher which is built as one piece and the attachment to a bicycle for a regular thresher with a crank. Pedal-powered threshers have been suggested or made available to farming communities by governmental or non-governmental organizations. It should be remembered that there are some disadvantages to these threshers and their impact in the specific region should be researched before being suggested.

== Threshers ==
Thresher are many different designs for threshers and they can be made from wood or metal. The shape of the thresher can vary, but it must include some main parts:

- A cylinder with spikes or loops that will pull the grains off the stalks as they are held onto the cylinder, or pushed through. These cylinders can be made from metal, or a progression of wooden boards that form a wheel. Different designs that will work better for different crops. For rice it has been found that wire loops should be used and the best spacing for these loops is approximately 40 mm apart and 60 mm high. This study was performed in the North Western Himalayan region of India. Loops are generally preferred for crops with small grains such as wheat, sorghum, pearl millet, etc. For corn/maize is it is suggested that solid spikes, 6 mm long, and spaced 200 mm apart be used. This study was done in Nigeria. Nails may be used as a rudimentary form of spikes. A cylinder without spikes or loops can be used if the grain is being ground against a surface. A model of this type was developed by the Massachusetts Institute of Technology for a project in Guatemala.
- A cover behind the cylinder is required to prevent grain from flying out of the machine while threshing.
- Attachment of crank to cylinder with use of bolts and metal pieces.

== Pedal-powered threshers ==
=== Stationary pedal-system ===
An addition that can be built to make a thresher more efficient is to make it pedal-powered. This adds two more parts:

- A seat for the pedalling operator
- Pedals that are attached to the crank with a chain and sprocket.

The pedal-powered thresher developed by the Maya Pedal Project provides a good example of a built-in pedal system to a thresher/mill.

=== Attachment to a bicycle ===
An attachment to a regular bicycle can be built to allow the bike to be used as the seat, pedals, chain and sprocket of the thresher. The bicycle must be on a stand so that the back wheel is raised off the ground. Plans have been developed to build the attachment and the wheel-stand out of pieces of metal, including a large wheel that can be screwed to the crank section of the thresher (see External links). A drill will be required to make this as well.

== Advantages ==
Advantages of the thresher include less physical labour and more efficiency (amount of grain thresher per amount of time). Less seed breakage is also a benefit of using a thresher as opposed to stomping or beating grains. However, more breakage can occur it is not used properly.

== Complications ==
=== Cultural ===
Cultural differences must be considered. Introduction of machinery to the threshing process, and the way that the pedal-powered thresher is used have conflicted with cultural beliefs or practices in some cases. The preferences of the region must be taken into consideration.

=== Injury ===
There are physical dangers involved in introducing machinery into a farming process; one of these is injury to hands and arms when feeding the stalks into the thresher. When building the thresher, creating a higher hood/chute cover helps stop the operator’s hands from contacting the machine, but does not entirely eliminate the danger.

=== Seed breakage ===
Seeds can be broken and ruined as they go through the thresher, and seed breakage can happen more often with threshers that are the wrong size or design for the type of seed. The wire loops or spikes may have to be adjusted if seeds appear to be broken (please see suggestion for spacing). Seed breakage also happens with stomping and beating, however if the thresher is not built in an appropriate way for the specific grain, more breakage may occur. If the thresher is well-suited for the size of the grain and stalks, it should have fewer broken seeds than beating or stomping. The most common seed breakage with threshers is with corn/maize, when there is too much moisture in the kernels. This can be reduced by drying kernels more thoroughly before threshing.

=== Size/weight ===
The size and weight of the thresher can be problematic. The thresher may need to be carried, and therefore must be light enough for one person. The suggested weight is 35 kg. On hillside farms it may be difficult to transport the thresher or to set it up properly.

== Bibliography ==
- Dewangan, K.N., C. Owary, and R.K. Datta. "Anthropometry of Male Agricultural Workers of North-eastern India and Its Use in Design of Agricultural Tools and Equipment". International Journal of Industrial Ergonomics 40(2010): 560-73.
- Ebenezer, Job S., Ph.D. "Technology for the Poor". Technology for the Poor. N.p., n.d. Web. 21 Oct. 2013.
- Mtshali, Sazile. "Honing Technologies That Build Women's Economic Base" Agenda 38(1998): 23-35.
- Nkakini, S., M. Ayotamuno, G. Maeba, S. Ogaji, and S. Probert. "Manually-powered Continuous-flow Maize-sheller". Applied Energy 84(2007): 1175-186.
- Pedal Powered Water Pumps, Threshers, Blenders, Tile Makers and More. Massachusetts Institute of Technology, 2001. Web. 21 Oct. 2013.
- Quisumbing, Agnes R., and Lauren Pandolfelli. "Promising Approaches to Address the Needs of Poor Female Farmers: Resources, Constraints, and Interventions". World Development 38(2010): 581-92.
- Singh, K., I. Pardeshi, M. Kumar, K. Srinivas, and A. Srivastva. "Optimisation of Machine Parameters of a Pedal-operated Paddy Thresher Using RSM". Biosystems Engineering 100(2008): 591-600.
