= Harold Ketron =

American football player and coach (1879–1946)

Georgia Bulldogs
- Position: Center/Tackle

Personal information
- Born: July 21, 1879; Clarkesville, Georgia, U.S.
- Died: December 22, 1946 (aged 67); Santa Barbara, California, U.S.

Career information
- College: Georgia (1901–1903)

Awards and highlights
- All-Southern (1902)

Harold Wayne "War Eagle" Ketron (July 21, 1879 – December 22, 1946) was an American college football player and coach.

== Early life ==
Harold Wayne Ketron was born on July 21, 1879, in Clarkesville, Georgia, to Irenaus Amelicu Ketron and Roselena McConnell. His father Irenaus was a physician. Raised on a mountain farm, he and his brothers roamed the hills of Habersham County, converting any likely pasture into a playing field, and participating in any available contest of skill or brawn. One book reports that Ketron is the origin of the War Eagle cry now used by the Auburn Tigers, bringing the cry to Athens when he enrolled at the University of Georgia. It was the favorite expression of Habersham residents when they partook of 'double and twisted' corn.

=== University of Georgia ===
Ketron was a prominent member of the Georgia Bulldogs football teams of the University of Georgia. Some note him as Georgia's first great football player. Ketron was known as quite a physical player, one source reporting he pulled hair and spat tobacco juice in faces. His younger brother Grover Cleveland Ketron played for Georgia in later years.

==== 1902 ====
In 1902, Ketron was selected All-Southern from his center position.

==== 1903 ====
He was the only returning starter and captain of the 1903 team; "Fortunately," remarked the Atlanta Constitution, "Ketron is a whole team in himself." Ketron was shifted from center to tackle in 1903.

One writer claims "There have been many of the old players who have followed the Georgia games long after graduation, but none of them with a record of more loyalty than the "War Eagle."' He recruited Charley Trippi to play for the Bulldogs, seeing him in high school while officiating high school games and owning a Coca-Cola bottling plant in Wilkes-Barre.

== Coaching career ==
He was later an assistant at his alma mater, in 1912 and 1913.
