= 1904 Southern Intercollegiate Athletic Association football season =

- League: NCAA
- Sport: College football
- Duration: September 24, 1904 through December 4, 1904
- Teams: 17

Regular Season
- Season champions: Vanderbilt; Auburn

Football seasons
- ← 1903 1905 →

1904 Southern Intercollegiate Athletic Association football standings
	Conf.					Overall
Team	W		L		T	W		L		T
Vanderbilt +	5	–	0	–	0	9	–	0	–	0
Auburn +	5	–	0	–	0	5	–	0	–	0
Sewanee	4	–	1	–	0	7	–	1	–	0
Georgia Tech	3	–	1	–	1	8	–	1	–	1
Alabama	5	–	3	–	0	7	–	3	–	0
Clemson	3	–	2	–	1	3	–	3	–	1
Tulane	3	–	2	–	0	5	–	2	–	0
Kentucky State	0	–	0	–	0	9	–	1	–	0
Ole Miss	2	–	3	–	0	4	–	3	–	0
LSU	1	–	2	–	0	3	–	4	–	0
Tennessee	1	–	4	–	1	3	–	5	–	1
Cumberland (TN)	0	–	1	–	0	2	–	1	–	0
Nashville	0	–	4	–	1	2	–	5	–	1
Georgia	0	–	4	–	0	1	–	5	–	0
Mississippi A&M	0	–	4	–	0	2	–	4	–	0
+ – Conference co-champions

The 1904 Southern Intercollegiate Athletic Association football season was the college football games played by the member schools of the Southern Intercollegiate Athletic Association as part of the 1904 college football season. The season began on September 24 with conference member Sewanee hosting the Mooney School.

1904 saw new coaches Mike Donahue at Auburn and Dan McGugin at Vanderbilt, both of which posted undefeated conference records. McGugin remains the only coach in NCAA history to win his first three games by 60 points. Both McGugin and Donahue were inaugural inductees into the College Football Hall of Fame. The SIAA forbade a postseason contest between Auburn and Vanderbilt.

Also significantly, John Heisman was hired at Georgia Tech.

== Season overview ==
=== Results and team statistics ===
Conf. Rank	Team	Head coach	Overall record	Conf. record	PPG	PAG
1 (tie)	Vanderbilt	Dan McGugin	9–0	5–0	**52.7**	**0.4**
1 (tie)	Auburn	Mike Donahue	5–0	5–0	19.5	1.8
3	Sewanee	George S. Whitney	7–1	4–1	22.5	4.6
4	Georgia Tech	John Heisman	8–1–1	3–1–1	28.7	3.4
5	Alabama	W. A. Blount	7–3	5–3	10.0	6.2
6 (tie)	Clemson	Shack Shealy	3–3–1	3–2–1	7.1	6.4
6 (tie)	Tulane	Thomas A. Barry	5–2	3–2	8.3	3.4
8	Cumberland	A. L. Phillips	3–1	1–1	43.7	
9	Kentucky State	Fred Schacht	9–1	0–0	27.7	1.5
10	Mississippi	M. S. Harvey	4–3	2–3	26.4	15.1
11	LSU	Dan A. Killian	3–4	1–2	5.4	5.4
12	Tennessee	Sax Crawford	3–5–1	1–4–1	5.0	8.6
13	Nashville	H. F. Fisher	1–7–1	0–5–1	4.3	21.0
14 (tie)	Mississippi A&M	Daniel S. Martin	2–5	0–4	14.4	18.0
14 (tie)	Georgia	Charles A. Barnard	1–5	0–4	11.5	11.3

Key

PPG = Average of points scored per game
PAG = Average of points allowed per game

=== Regular season ===
Index to colors and formatting
Non-conference matchup; SIAA member won
Non-conference matchup; SIAA member lost
Non-conference matchup; tie
Conference matchup

SIAA teams in bold.

==== Week One ====
Date	Visiting team	Home team	Site	Result	Attendance	Reference
September 24	Mooney	**Sewanee**	Hardee Field • Sewanee, TN	**W** 47–0		

==== Week Two ====
Date	Visiting team	Home team	Site	Result	Attendance	Reference
October 1	Tennessee Docs	**Sewanee**	Hardee Field • Sewanee, TN	**W** 58–0		
October 1	Camp McPherson	**Georgia Tech**	Piedmont Park • Atlanta, GA	**W** 11–5		
October 1	**Vanderbilt**	**Mississippi A&M**	Columbus Fairgrounds • Columbus, MS	**VAN** 61–0		
October 1	Maryville (TN)	**Tennessee**	Baldwin Park • Knoxville, TN	**W** 17–0		
October 3	Florida Agricultural College	**Alabama**	The Quad • Tuscaloosa, AL	**W** 29–0		

==== Week Three ====
Date	Visiting team	Home team	Site	Result	Attendance	Reference
October 4	Florida Agricultural College	Auburn	Drill Field • Auburn, AL	**W** 44–0		
October 8	Florida State College	Georgia Tech	Piedmont Park • Atlanta, GA	**W** 35–0		
October 8	**Clemson**	Alabama	West End Park • Birmingham, AL	**CLEM** 18–0		
October 8	Florida Agricultural College	Georgia	Central City Park • Macon, GA	**W** 52–0		
October 8	Tennessee Docs	Nashville	Peabody Field • Nashville, TN	**L** 21–0		
October 8	Georgetown (KY)	Vanderbilt	Dudley Field • Nashville, TN	**W** 66–0		

==== Week Four ====
Date	Visiting team	Home team	Site	Result	Attendance	Reference
October 12	**Nashville**	VPI	Gibboney Field • Blacksburg, VA	**L** 32–0		
October 15	**Alabama**	**Mississippi A&M**	Columbus Fairgrounds • Columbus, MS	**ALA** 6–0		
October 15	**Auburn**	**Clemson**	Bowman Field • Calhoun, SC	**AUB** 5–0		
October 15	Mooney	**Georgia Tech**	Piedmont Park • Atlanta, GA	**W** 51–0		
October 15	**Nashville**	**Tennessee**	Baldwin Park • Knoxville, TN	**T** 0–0		
October 15	**Sewanee**	Washington University	World's Fair Stadium • St. Louis, MO	**W** 17–0		
October 15	**Ole Miss**	**Vanderbilt**	Dudley Field • Nashville, TN	**VAN** 69–0		
October 17	Florida Agricultural College	**Georgia Tech**	Piedmont Park • Atlanta, GA	**W** 77–0		

==== Week Five ====
Date	Visiting team	Home team	Site	Result	Attendance	Reference
October 21	Louisiana Industrial	LSU	State Field • Baton Rouge, LA	**W** 17–0		
October 22	**Nashville**	Auburn	West End Park • Birmingham, AL	**AUB** 10–0		
October 22	**Georgia**	Clemson	Bowman Field • Calhoun, SC	**CLEM** 10–0		
October 22	**Tennessee**	Georgia Tech	Piedmont Park • Atlanta, GA	**GT** 2–0		
October 22	**Ole Miss**	Mississippi A&M	Columbus Fairgrounds • Columbus, MS	**MISS** 17–5		
October 22	Missouri Mines	Vanderbilt	Dudley Field • Nashville, TN	**W** 29–4		
October 23	Louisiana Industrial	Tulane	Athletic Park • New Orleans, LA	**W** 11–0		
October 24	**Nashville**	Alabama	The Quad • Tuscaloosa, AL	**ALA** 17–0		

==== Week Six ====
Date	Visiting team	Home team	Site	Result	Attendance	Reference
October 26	**Georgia**	South Carolina	Columbia, SC	**L** 0–2		
October 27	**Sewanee**	**Clemson**	Columbia, SC	**SEW** 11–5	5,000	
October 28	**LSU**	Shreveport Athletic Association	Shreveport Ball Park • Shreveport, LA	**L** 0–16		
October 29	**Georgia Tech**	**Auburn**	Drill Field • Auburn, AL	**AUB** 12–0		
October 29	**Sewanee**	**Tennessee**	Baldwin Park • Knoxville, TN	**SEW** 12–0		
October 29	**LSU**	Louisiana Industrial	Ruston, LA	**L** 0–6		
October 29	Southwestern Baptist	**Ole Miss**	Oxford, MS	**W** 114–0		
October 29	**Mississippi A&M**	**Tulane**	Athletic Park • New Orleans, LA	**TUL** 10–0	1,100	
October 29	**Vanderbilt**	Central University	Danville, KY	**W** 97–0		

==== Week Seven ====
Date	Visiting team	Home team	Site	Result	Attendance	Reference
November 5	**Clemson**	**Georgia Tech**	Piedmont Park • Atlanta, GA	**T** 11–11		
November 5	**Georgia**	**Alabama**	The Quad • Tuscaloosa, AL	**ALA** 16–5		
November 5	Maryville	**Cumberland**	Lebanon, TN	**W** 45–0		
November 5	**Ole Miss**	**LSU**	State Field • Baton Rouge, LA	**LSU** 5–0		
November 5	**Sewanee**	**Texas A&M**	Dallas, TX	**SEW** 17–5		
November 5	**Tulane**	Marion	Marion, AL	**W** 10–0		
November 5	**Tennessee**	**Vanderbilt**	Dudley Field • Nashville, TN	**VAN** 22–0		

==== Week Eight ====
Date	Visiting team	Home team	Site	Result	Attendance	Reference
November 10	Tennessee Docs	LSU	State Field • Baton Rouge, LA	**W** 16–0		
November 11	Tennessee Docs	Mississippi A&M	Starkville Fairgrounds • Starkville, MS	**W** 59–0		
November 12	Tennessee Docs	Ole Miss	League Park • Jackson, MS	**W** 42–0		
November 12	**Auburn**	Alabama	West End Park • Birmingham, AL	**AUB** 29–5		
November 12	**Clemson**	Tennessee	Baldwin Park • Knoxville, TN	**CLEM** 6–0		
November 12	**Georgia**	Georgia Tech	Piedmont Park • Atlanta, GA	**GT** 23–6		
November 12	**Sewanee**	Tulane	Athletic Park • New Orleans, LA	**SEW** 18–0		
November 12	**Nashville**	Vanderbilt	Dudley Field • Nashville, TN	**VAN** 81–0	2,500	

==== Week Nine ====
Date	Visiting team	Home team	Site	Result	Attendance	Reference
November 15	Bethel (KY)	**Cumberland**	Lebanon, TN	**W** 103–0		
November 16	Tennessee Docs	**Georgia Tech**	Piedmont Park • Atlanta, GA	**W** 59–0		
November 19	**Ole Miss**	**Nashville**	Citizens Park • Memphis, TN	**MISS** 12–5		
November 19	**Tennessee**	Grant	Olympic Park Field • Chattanooga, TN	**W** 23–0		
November 19	**Vanderbilt**	Central (KY)	Richmond, KY	**W** 22–0		
November 19	**LSU**	**Tulane**	Athletic Park • New Orleans, LA	**TUL** 5–0	5,000	
November 19	Louisiana Industrial	**Mississippi A&M**	Starkville Fairgrounds • Starkville, MS	**W** 32–5		

==== Week Ten ====
Date	Visiting team	Home team	Site	Result	Attendance	Reference
November 24	Auburn	**Georgia**	Central City Park • Macon, GA	**UGA** 17–6		
November 24	Cumberland	**Georgia Tech**	Piedmont Park • Atlanta, GA	**GT** 18–0	5,000	
November 24	Clemson	North Carolina A&M	State Fairgrounds • Raleigh, NC	**L** 0–18		
November 24	Tennessee	**Alabama**	West End Park • Birmingham, AL	**TENN** 5–0		
November 24	Ole Miss	**Tulane**	Athletic Park • New Orleans, LA	**TUL** 22–0		
November 24	Sewanee	**Vanderbilt**	Dudley Field • Nashville, TN	**VAN** 27–0	6,500	

==== Week Eleven ====
Date	Visiting team	Home team	Site	Result	Attendance	Reference
December 2	**Alabama**	**LSU**	State Field • Baton Rouge, LA	**ALA** 11–0		
December 3	**Alabama**	**Tulane**	Athletic Park • New Orleans, LA	**ALA** 6–0	1,000	
December 4	**Alabama**	Pensacola Athletic Club	Pensacola, FL	**W** 10–5		

== All-Southern team ==
The composite All-Southern team compiled by John de Saulles included:

Position	Name	Team
QB	John Scarbrough	Sewanee
HB	Honus Craig	Vanderbilt
HB	Willard Steele	Cumberland
FB	Humphrey Foy	Auburn
E	Jones Beene	Tennessee
T	Lob Brown	Georgia Tech
G	Henry D. Phillips	Sewanee
C	Stein Stone	Vanderbilt
G	Innis Brown	Vanderbilt
T	Puss Derrick	Clemson
E	Ed Hamilton	Vanderbilt
