= List of Tennessee Volunteers football seasons =

The following is a complete list of Tennessee Volunteers football seasons through the 2025 season.

== Seasons ==
Year	Coach	Overall	Conference	Standing	Bowl/playoffs	Coaches^{#}	AP^{°}
Independent (1891–1895)
1891	No coach	0–1					
1892	No coach	2–5					
1893	No coach	2–4					
1894	Unofficial team	2–0–2					
1895	Unofficial team	3–2–1					
Southern Intercollegiate Athletic Association (1896–1898)
1896	No coach	4–0	0–0	N/A			
1897	No coach	4–1–1	0–0	N/A			
1898	No team						
J. A. Pierce (Southern Intercollegiate Athletic Association) (1899–1900)
1899	J. A. Pierce	6–2	2–1	T–5th			
1900	J. A. Pierce	3–2–1	0–2–1	13th			
Gilbert Kelly (Southern Intercollegiate Athletic Association) (1901)
1901	Gilbert Kelly	3–3–2	1–1–2	T–7th			
Hubert Fisher (Southern Intercollegiate Athletic Association) (1902–1903)
1902	Hubert Fisher	6–2	4–2	T–5th			
1903	Hubert Fisher	4–5	2–4	12th			
Sax Crawford (Southern Intercollegiate Athletic Association) (1904)
1904	Sax Crawford	3–5–1	1–4–1	12th			
James DePree (Southern Intercollegiate Athletic Association) (1905–1906)
1905	James DePree	3–5–1	0–4–1	13th			
1906	James DePree	1–6–2	0–3–1	10th			
George Levene (Southern Intercollegiate Athletic Association) (1907–1909)
1907	George Levene	7–2–1	3–2	T–5th			
1908	George Levene	7–2	3–2	4th			
1909	George Levene	1–6–2	0–5	14th			
Lex Stone (Southern Intercollegiate Athletic Association) (1910)
1910	Lex Stone	3–5–1	1–4	11th			
Zora Clevenger (Southern Intercollegiate Athletic Association) (1911–1915)
1911	Zora Clevenger	3–4–2	0–2	T–16th			
1912	Zora Clevenger	4–4	0–4	T–17th			
1913	Zora Clevenger	6–3	1–3	12th			
1914	Zora Clevenger	9–0	6–0	T–1st			
1915	Zora Clevenger	4–4	1–4	T–18th			
John R. Bender (Southern Intercollegiate Athletic Association) (1916–1920)
1916	John R. Bender	8–0–1	6–0–1	T–1st			
1917	Unofficial team	0–3					
1918	Unofficial team	3–2					
1919	John R. Bender	3–3–3	0–3–2	20th			
1920	John R. Bender	7–2	5–2	8th			
M. B. Banks (Southern Intercollegiate Athletic Association) (1921)
1921	M. B. Banks	6–2–1	4–1–1	5th			
M. B. Banks (Southern Conference) (1922–1925)
1922	M. B. Banks	8–2	3–2	7th			
1923	M. B. Banks	5–4–1	4–3	10th			
1924	M. B. Banks	3–5	0–4	22nd			
1925	M. B. Banks	5–2–1	2–2–1	T–10th			
Robert Neyland (Southern Conference) (1926–1932)
1926	Robert Neyland	8–1	5–1	2nd			
1927	Robert Neyland	8–0–1	5–0–1	T–1st			
1928	Robert Neyland	9–0–1	6–0–1	2nd			
1929	Robert Neyland	9–0–1	6–0–1	2nd			
1930	Robert Neyland	9–1	6–1	3rd			
1931	Robert Neyland	9–0–1	6–0–1	2nd			
1932	Robert Neyland	9–0–1	7–0–1	T–1st			
Robert Neyland (Southeastern Conference) (1933–1934)
1933	Robert Neyland	7–3	5–2	4th			
1934	Robert Neyland	8–2	5–1	3rd			
W. H. Britton (Southeastern Conference) (1935)
1935	W. H. Britton	4–5	2–3	T–9th			
Robert Neyland (Southeastern Conference) (1936–1940)
1936	Robert Neyland	6–2–2	3–1–2	4th			17
1937	Robert Neyland	6–3–1	4–3	7th			
1938	Robert Neyland	11–0	7–0	1st	W Orange		2
1939	Robert Neyland	10–1	6–0	T–1st	L Rose		2
1940	Robert Neyland	10–1	5–0	1st	L Sugar		4
John Barnhill (Southeastern Conference) (1941–1945)
1941	John Barnhill	8–2	3–1	2nd			18
1942	John Barnhill	9–1–1	4–1	T–2nd	W Sugar		7
1943	No team						
1944	John Barnhill	7–1–1	5–0–1	2nd	L Rose		12
1945	John Barnhill	8–1	3–1	2nd			14
Robert Neyland (Southeastern Conference) (1946–1952)
1946	Robert Neyland	9–2	5–0	T–1st	L Orange		7
1947	Robert Neyland	5–5	2–3	T–9th			
1948	Robert Neyland	4–4–2	2–3–1	8th			
1949	Robert Neyland	7–2–1	4–1–1	3rd			17
1950	Robert Neyland	11–1	4–1	2nd	W Cotton	3	4
1951	Robert Neyland	10–1	5–0	T–1st	L Sugar	1	1
1952	Robert Neyland	8–2–1	5–0–1	2nd	L Cotton	8	8
Harvey Robinson (Southeastern Conference) (1953–1954)
1953	Harvey Robinson	6–4–1	3–2–1	7th			
1954	Harvey Robinson	4–6	1–5	T–11th			
Bowden Wyatt (Southeastern Conference) (1955–1962)
1955	Bowden Wyatt	6–3–1	3–2–1	5th			
1956	Bowden Wyatt	10–1	6–0	1st	L Sugar	2	2
1957	Bowden Wyatt	8–3	4–3	5th	W Gator	16	13
1958	Bowden Wyatt	4–6	4–3	5th			
1959	Bowden Wyatt	5–4–1	3–4–1	8th			
1960	Bowden Wyatt	6–2–2	3–2–2	5th		19	
1961	Bowden Wyatt	6–4	4–3	T–4th			
1962	Bowden Wyatt	4–6	2–6	10th			
Jim McDonald (Southeastern Conference) (1963)
1963	Jim McDonald	5–5	3–5	9th			
Doug Dickey (Southeastern Conference) (1964–1969)
1964	Doug Dickey	4–5–1	1–5–1	10th			
1965	Doug Dickey	8–1–2	3–1–2	T–3rd	W Bluebonnet	7	7
1966	Doug Dickey	8–3	4–2	5th	W Gator	14	
1967	Doug Dickey	9–2	6–0	1st	L Orange	2	2
1968	Doug Dickey	8–2–1	4–1–1	2nd	L Cotton	7	13
1969	Doug Dickey	9–2	5–1	1st	L Gator	11	15
Bill Battle (Southeastern Conference) (1970–1976)
1970	Bill Battle	11–1	4–1	2nd	W Sugar	4	4
1971	Bill Battle	10–2	4–2	T–4th	W Liberty	9	9
1972	Bill Battle	10–2	4–2	4th	W Bluebonnet	11	8
1973	Bill Battle	8–4	3–3	4th	L Gator		19
1974	Bill Battle	7–3–2	2–3–1	T–7th	W Liberty		20
1975	Bill Battle	7–5	3–3	5th			
1976	Bill Battle	6–5	2–4	8th			
Johnny Majors (Southeastern Conference) (1977–1992)
1977	Johnny Majors	4–7	1–5	8th			
1978	Johnny Majors	5–5–1	3–3	T–4th			
1979	Johnny Majors	7–5	3–3	T–5th	L Bluebonnet		
1980	Johnny Majors	5–6	3–3	6th			
1981	Johnny Majors	8–4	3–3	T–4th	W Garden State		
1982	Johnny Majors	6–5–1	3–2–1	5th	L Peach		
1983	Johnny Majors	9–3	4–2	T–3rd	W Florida Citrus	17	
1984	Johnny Majors	7–4–1	3–3	T–5th	L Sun		
1985	Johnny Majors	9–1–2	5–1	1st	W Sugar	4	4
1986	Johnny Majors	7–5	3–3	6th	W Liberty		
1987	Johnny Majors	10–2–1	4–1–1	3rd	W Peach	13	14
1988	Johnny Majors	5–6	3–4	T–6th			
1989	Johnny Majors	11–1	6–1	T–1st	W Cotton	5	5
1990	Johnny Majors	9–2–2	5–1–1	1st	W Sugar	7	8
1991	Johnny Majors	9–3	5–2	3rd	L Fiesta	15	14
1992	Johnny Majors (Note: Fulmer served as interim coach for the first three games of the 1992 season while Johnny Majors recovered from heart surgery. He was named full-time coach after the 1992 season, and led the team in the 1993 Hall of Fame Bowl. Tennessee credits the first three games of the 1992 regular season and the Hall of Fame Bowl to Fulmer, and the eight games in between to Majors.)	9–3	5–3	3rd (Eastern)	W Hall of Fame	12	12
Phillip Fulmer (Southeastern Conference) (1992–2008)
1993	Phillip Fulmer	10–2 (Note: Fulmer's 1993 Tennessee team finished 9–2–1 (6–1–1), but Alabama subsequently forfeited the tie to Tennessee.)	7–1	2nd (Eastern)	L Florida Citrus	11	12
1994	Phillip Fulmer	8–4	5–3	2nd (Eastern)	W Gator^{†}	18	22
1995	Phillip Fulmer	11–1	7–1	2nd (Eastern)	W Florida Citrus	2	3
1996	Phillip Fulmer	10–2	7–1	2nd (Eastern)	W Florida Citrus	9	9
1997	Phillip Fulmer	11–2	7–1	1st (Eastern)	L Orange^{†}	8	7
1998	Phillip Fulmer	13–0	8–0	1st (Eastern)	W Fiesta^{†}	1	1
1999	Phillip Fulmer	9–3	6–2	2nd (Eastern)	L Fiesta^{†}	9	9
2000	Phillip Fulmer	8–4	5–3	2nd (Eastern)	L Cotton	25	
2001	Phillip Fulmer	11–2	7–1	1st (Eastern)	W Florida Citrus	4	4
2002	Phillip Fulmer	8–5	5–3	3rd (Eastern)	L Peach		
2003	Phillip Fulmer	10–3	6–2	T–1st (Eastern)	L Peach	16	15
2004	Phillip Fulmer	10–3	7–1	1st (Eastern)	W Cotton	15	13
2005	Phillip Fulmer	5–6	3–5	4th (Eastern)			
2006	Phillip Fulmer	9–4	5–3	2nd (Eastern)	L Outback	23	25
2007	Phillip Fulmer	10–4	6–2	T–1st (Eastern)	W Outback	12	12
2008	Phillip Fulmer	5–7	3–5	5th (Eastern)			
Lane Kiffin (Southeastern Conference) (2009)
2009	Lane Kiffin	7–6	4–4	T–2nd (Eastern)	L Chick-fil-A		
Derek Dooley (Southeastern Conference) (2010–2012)
2010	Derek Dooley	6–7	3–5	T–3rd (Eastern)	L Music City		
2011	Derek Dooley	5–7	1–7	6th (Eastern)			
2012	Derek Dooley (Note: Dooley was fired after 11 games and Jim Chaney coached the last game of the season.)	5–7	1–7	6th (Eastern)			
Butch Jones (Southeastern Conference) (2013–2017)
2013	Butch Jones	5–7	2–6	6th (Eastern)			
2014	Butch Jones	7–6	3–5	T–4th (Eastern)	W TaxSlayer		
2015	Butch Jones	9–4	5–3	T–2nd (Eastern)	W Outback	23	22
2016	Butch Jones	9–4	4–4	T–2nd (Eastern)	W Music City	24	22
2017	Butch Jones (Note: Jones was fired by Tennessee prior to the LSU game and was replaced by Brady Hoke, who coached the final two games of the year.)	4–8	0–8	7th (Eastern)			
Jeremy Pruitt (Southeastern Conference) (2018–2020)
2018	Jeremy Pruitt	5–7	2–6	7th (Eastern)			
2019	Jeremy Pruitt	0–5 (Note: The NCAA vacated all 11 of Tennessee's wins from the 2019 and 2020 seasons after ruling that it used ineligible players.)	0–3	3rd (Eastern)	Vacated Gator		
2020	Jeremy Pruitt	0–7	0–7	5th (Eastern)	CX Liberty (Note: Tennessee dropped out of bowl game due to a rise in positive COVID cases within the program and was replaced by Army.)		
Josh Heupel (Southeastern Conference) (2021–present)
2021	Josh Heupel	7–6	4–4	3rd (Eastern)	L Music City		
2022	Josh Heupel	11–2	6–2	2nd (Eastern)	W Orange^{†}	6	6
2023	Josh Heupel	9–4	4–4	3rd (Eastern)	W Citrus	17	19
2024	Josh Heupel	10–3	6–2	T–2nd	L CFP First Round^{†}	8	9
2025	Josh Heupel	8–5	4–4	8th	L Music City		
Total:		887–427–57					
National championship Conference title Conference division title or championship game berth
^{†}Indicates Bowl Coalition, Bowl Alliance, BCS, or CFP / New Years' Six bowl.; ^{#}Rankings from final Coaches Poll.; ^{°}Rankings from final AP Poll.
