= 1904 Alabama Crimson White football team =

American college football season

1904 Alabama Crimson White football
- Conference: Southern Intercollegiate Athletic Association
- Record: 7–3 (5–3 SIAA)
- Head coach: W. A. Blount (2nd season)
- Captain: W. S. Wyatt
- Home stadium: The Quad; West End Park

1904 Southern Intercollegiate Athletic Association football standings
	Conf.					Overall
Team	W		L		T	W		L		T
Vanderbilt +	5	–	0	–	0	9	–	0	–	0
Auburn +	5	–	0	–	0	5	–	0	–	0
Sewanee	4	–	1	–	0	7	–	1	–	0
Georgia Tech	3	–	1	–	1	8	–	1	–	1
Alabama	5	–	3	–	0	7	–	3	–	0
Clemson	3	–	2	–	1	3	–	3	–	1
Tulane	3	–	2	–	0	5	–	2	–	0
Kentucky State	0	–	0	–	0	9	–	1	–	0
Ole Miss	2	–	3	–	0	4	–	3	–	0
LSU	1	–	2	–	0	3	–	4	–	0
Tennessee	1	–	4	–	1	3	–	5	–	1
Cumberland (TN)	0	–	1	–	0	2	–	1	–	0
Nashville	0	–	4	–	1	2	–	5	–	1
Georgia	0	–	4	–	0	1	–	5	–	0
Mississippi A&M	0	–	4	–	0	2	–	4	–	0
+ – Conference co-champions

The 1904 Alabama Crimson White football team (Note: Alabama football teams were not referred to as the "Crimson Tide" until the 1907 season. Prior to 1907, the team was called the "Crimson White" from 1893 to 1906 and the "Cadets" in 1892.) (variously "Alabama", "UA" or "Bama") represented the University of Alabama in the 1904 Southern Intercollegiate Athletic Association football season. The team was led by head coach W. A. Blount, in his second season, and played their home games at The Quad in Tuscaloosa and at West End Park in Birmingham, Alabama. In what was the twelfth season of Alabama football, the team finished with a record of seven wins and three losses (7–3, 5–3 SIAA).

== Schedule ==
Date	Opponent	Site	Result	Attendance	Source
October 1	Florida Agricultural*	The Quad; Tuscaloosa, AL	W 29–0		
October 8	Clemson	West End Park; Birmingham, AL (rivalry)	L 0–18		
October 15	at Mississippi A&M	Columbus Fairgrounds; Columbus, MS (rivalry)	W 10–5		
October 24	Nashville	The Quad; Tuscaloosa, AL	W 17–0		
November 5	Georgia	The Quad; Tuscaloosa, AL (rivalry)	W 16–5		
November 12	Auburn	West End Park; Birmingham, AL (rivalry)	L 6–29		
November 24	Tennessee	West End Park; Birmingham, AL (rivalry)	L 0–5		
December 2	at LSU	State Field; Baton Rouge, LA (rivalry)	W 11–0		
December 3	at Tulane	Athletic Park; New Orleans, LA	W 6–0	1,000	
December 4	at Pensacola Athletic Club*	Pensacola, FL	W 10–5		
*Non-conference game

- Scoring note: (Note: For the 1904 season, point values were different from those used in contemporary games. In 1904 a touchdown was worth five points, a field goal was worth four points and a conversion (PAT) was worth one point.)

== Game summaries ==
=== Florida Agricultural ===
To open the 1904 season, Alabama defeated Florida Agricultural College 29–0 at Tuscaloosa. In the game, Alabama touchdowns were scored by William LaFayette Ward (2), Chamberlain, Auxford Burks and Frank Clark.

The starting lineup was: J. V. Boyles (left end), C. P. Butcher (left tackle), Harvey Sartain (left guard), James C. Gwin (center), Guy Redden (right guard), Gates (right tackle), George Spigener Wilcox (right end), R. R. Cummings (quarterback), Auxford Burks (left halfback), Floy Hall (right halfback), William LaFayette Ward (fullback).

=== Clemson ===
Team	1	2	Total
• Clemson	6	12	18
Alabama	0	0	0

- Date: October 8
- Location: West End Park
  Birmingham, AL

In what was their first Birmingham game of the season, Alabama were shutout by the Clemson Tigers 18–0 at the West End Park. Puss Derrick gave the Tigers a 6–0 lead with his ten-yard touchdown run early in the first half. Joe Holland then made the final score 18–0 behind his pair of second half touchdown runs. The loss brought Alabama's all-time record against Clemson to 0–2.

=== Mississippi A&M ===
Team	1	2	Total
• Alabama	10	0	10
Mississippi A&M	0	5	5

- Date: October 15
- Location: Columbus Fairgrounds
  Columbus, MS

A week after their loss to Clemson, Alabama led the Aggies of Mississippi A&M (now known as Mississippi State University) 10–5 in the second half when the Aggie squad left the field and forfeited the contest after a disputed call on the field. The Crimson and White took a 10–0 lead into halftime behind touchdown runs by Auxford Burks and Frank B. Clark. In the second half, Mississippi cut the Alabama lead in half after they scored on a short touchdown run. The game then ended later in the half after the Aggies disputed a referees call and subsequently forfeited the contest. The victory improved Alabama's all-time record against Mississippi A&M to 4–1.

=== Nashville ===
Team	1	2	Total
Nashville	0	0	0
• Alabama	5	12	17

- Date: October 24
- Location: The Quad
  Tuscaloosa, AL

In what was the only all time match-up against the University of Nashville, Alabama shutout the Garnet and Blue 17–0 at Tuscaloosa. Alabama took a 5–0 lead in the first half behind a short Auxford Burks touchdown run. In the second half, the made the final score 17–0 behind a short Frank B. Clark run and a 45-yard run by Burks that saw him escape six tackles en route to his second touchdown of the game.

The starting lineup was: Guy Redden (left end), W. C. Oates (left tackle), T. A. McDaniels (left guard), James C. Gwin (center), Harvey Sartain (right guard), C. P. Butcher (right tackle), Aubrey Boyles (right end), W. S. Wyatt (quarterback), Auxford Burks (left halfback), Frank B. Clark (right halfback), S. W. McClesky (fullback).

=== Georgia ===
Team	1	2	Total
Georgia	0	5	5
• Alabama	16	0	16

- Date: November 5
- Location: The Quad
  Tuscaloosa, AL

At Tuscaloosa, Alabama defeated Georgia 16–5 and registered their first all time win against the Bulldogs. The Crimson White scored all of their points in the first half and took a 16–0 lead into halftime behind a pair of C. P. Butcher touchdown runs and another by Auxford Burks. The victory improved Alabama's all-time record against Georgia to 1–2–1.

The starting lineup was: George Spigener Wilcox (left end), W. C. Oates (left tackle), T. A. McDaniels (left guard), James C. Gwin (center), Harvey Sartain (right guard), C. P. Butcher (right tackle), Aubrey Boyles (right end), W. S. Wyatt (quarterback), Auxford Burks (left halfback), W. E. Lewis (right halfback), S. W. McClesky (fullback).

=== Auburn ===
Team	1	2	Total
• Auburn	29	0	29
Alabama	0	6	6

- Date: November 12
- Location: West End Park
  Birmingham, AL

At Birmingham, Alabama was defeated by Auburn 29–6 and lost what was billed as the "Alabama State Championship." Alabama scored their only points in the second half on a Harvey Sartain touchdown run. The victory bought Alabama's all-time record against Auburn to 1–7.

The starting lineup was: George Spigener Wilcox (left end), W. C. Oates (left tackle), Guy Redden (left guard), James C. Gwin (center), Harvey Sartain (right guard), C. P. Butcher (right tackle), Aubrey Boyles (right end), W. S. Wyatt (quarterback), Auxford Burks (left halfback), Floy Hall (right halfback), S. W. McClesky (fullback).

=== Tennessee ===
Team	1	2	Total
• Tennessee	5	0	5
Alabama	0	0	0

- Date: November 24
- Location: West End Park
  Birmingham, AL

On Thanksgiving Day in Birmingham, Tennessee beat Alabama 5–0. McAllister scored on a play Tennessee used throughout the game, where he put his foot on the guard in front of him and had the other backs hurl him forward.

=== LSU ===
Hampered by injuries, LSU was beaten in Baton Rouge by Alabama 11–0. Butcher and Ward scored Alabama's touchdowns. The "feature play of the game" was a fake kick by LSU. Staudinger made 55 yards before Wyatt tackled him, saving a touchdown.

=== Tulane ===
Alabama met Tulane at Athletic Park in New Orleans and won 6–0. Sartain scored Alabama's touchdown. Tulane once drove to the 5-yard line, but lost the ball on downs.

=== Pensacola Athletic Club ===
Team	1	2	Total
• Alabama	10	0	10
Pensacola Athletic Club	6	0	6

- Date: December 4
- Location:
  Pensacola, FL

In Pensacola, Alabama won over the Pensacola Athletic Club 10–6. The Pensacola Team was composed of former players from Yale, Harvard, Army, Navy, Notre Dame, and Carlisle alongside high school athletes from Pensacola.

Wyatt scored two touchdowns for Alabama in the first half. Ward also sustained a broken nose during the game. Just before the end of the first half, Garrett scored for Pensacola.
