= Alabama–Georgia football rivalry =

American college football rivalry

- Alabama Crimson Tide Georgia Bulldogs
- First meeting: November 2, 1895; Georgia, 30–6
- Latest meeting: October 10, 2026; Georgia, 20–17
- Next meeting: 2028

Statistics
- Total meetings: 77
- All-time series: Alabama leads, 45–28–4
- Largest victory: Alabama, 36–0 (1905, 1923)
- Longest win streak: Alabama, 7 (2008–2021)
- Current win streak: Georgia, 2 (2025–present)

Locations of Alabama and Georgia

The Alabama–Georgia football rivalry is a college football rivalry game between the Crimson Tide of the University of Alabama and the Bulldogs of the University of Georgia. The two bordering state schools were charter members of the Southeastern Conference (SEC) in 1933 and played every season from 1944 to 1965. Despite no longer playing annually, Alabama and Georgia have met in several nationally important matchups in the twenty-first century, including five SEC championship games and two College Football Playoff national championship games since 2010, bringing the rivalry back into national prominence. In these recent years, the two programs are widely considered to be two of the preeminent programs of the sport, with thirteen of the rivalry's matchups being contested between AP Top 10 teams, including ten such matchups held since 2008.

== History ==
The two southern schools first met in 1895 in Columbus, Georgia. Georgia defeated Alabama by a score of 30–6. The teams did not meet again until 1901, another Georgia win, then continued to meet on a regular basis for the next several decades.

The teams played each other in every season from 1944 to 1965. Highlights of that era included two separate five-game winning streaks by Alabama and the first-ever college football game to be televised by the ABC network, Alabama's 21–6 win in 1960 in Birmingham.

In 1963, The Saturday Evening Post magazine reported that Alabama coach Paul "Bear" Bryant and Georgia athletic director and former coach Wally Butts had conspired to fix the 1962 game, which Alabama won 35–0. After the story broke, Butts resigned as athletic director, though Butts and Bryant denied the allegations. The two sued the magazine's publisher for libel, and the case reached the United States Supreme Court as Curtis Publishing Co. v. Butts (1967). The Supreme Court ruled in favor of Butts, with the publisher eventually being ordered to pay more than $3 million in damages. The lawsuit has been credited with leading to the end of the magazine.

Following the scandal, the schools decided to end their annual series after the 1965 meeting, which the Bulldogs won 18–17 on a last-second controversial flea-flicker (a hook-and-ladder) touchdown. They have played only sporadically since, including just four meetings from 1971 to 1982, an era in which the Tide or Bulldogs won at least a share of every SEC title.

=== SEC expansion and scheduling changes (1992–2011) ===
When the SEC expanded to twelve teams and split into two divisions in 1992, Alabama was placed in the West Division, while Georgia was in the East. Each team in the league was matched with two "permanent" cross-division rivals. Because Alabama and Georgia were not paired as permanent rivals, they would play only on a rotating basis (twice in an eight-year cycle) or in the newly created SEC Championship Game.

Later scheduling modifications, as well as the SEC's expansion to 14 teams, have resulted in just one permanent cross-division rival for each team, with Alabama playing Tennessee as part of the Third Saturday in October, and Georgia facing off against Auburn in the Deep South's Oldest Rivalry. The Crimson Tide and Bulldogs now saw each other in the regular season only twice per 12-year cycle.

From 1992 to 2011, Alabama and Georgia met six times, with each team winning three games each. Notable matchups included the 2007 and 2008 matchups, which were both featured on College GameDay. The 2007 matchup featured #22 Georgia narrowly defeating #16 Alabama 26–23 in overtime in Tuscaloosa. The 2008 matchup would feature #8 Alabama upsetting #3 Georgia 41–30 in Athens.

Since 1992, Alabama holds a 9–4 record over Georgia, which includes five post-season contests, including three SEC Championship Games won by Alabama and two College Football Playoff National Championship appearances split between the two teams. Many of the recent Alabama-Georgia matchups have been between highly ranked teams, with the regular-season matchups in 2007 and 2008 hosting . In 2007, #16 Georgia beat #23 Alabama in Overtime, 26–23. #8 Alabama won the 2008 matchup in Athens, a 41–30 upset over #3 Georgia.

=== Nationally prominent matchups (2012–present) ===
By 2012, both Georgia and Alabama had seen successes under head coaches Mark Richt and Nick Saban, respectively. The teams' first postseason meeting came in the 2012 SEC Championship Game, with the winner advancing to play for the national championship, as Alabama and Georgia were ranked #2 and #3 respectively. #2 Alabama defeated #3 Georgia, 32–28, after Georgia's final play fell five yards short of a winning score.

Mark Richt was dismissed as Georgia's head coach at the end of the 2015 season, and Georgia hired Alabama defensive coordinator and former Georgia player Kirby Smart to replace him. Smart quickly returned Georgia to national prominence, and in 2017, Georgia won the SEC Championship over Auburn and advanced to the national championship, where they would meet Smart's former boss Nick Saban.

In the 2018 College Football Playoff National Championship, Alabama overcame a 13-point deficit to defeat Georgia by a score of 26–23 in overtime, clinching its 17th national championship in program history. Alabama's win marked the first time in college football history that a program had won the national championship game despite not having the lead the entire game.

The following season, the teams played in the 2018 SEC Championship Game. #4 Georgia led 28–14 with just over three minutes remaining in the third quarter, only to see #1 Alabama once again rally to win, 35–28. The loss would prevent Georgia from making their second-straight College Football Playoff appearance, and Alabama would end up losing the national championship to Clemson.

The teams next met during the 2020 regular season in Tuscaloosa, Alabama. This was a highly anticipated game, with both teams ranked in the top three and Alabama hosting College GameDay. It was the first meeting in Tuscaloosa since 2007. The game was back and forth throughout the first half, and Georgia led 24–20 at halftime. In the second half, however, Alabama outscored Georgia with 21 unanswered points and won 41–24. Alabama would go on to finish with a perfect 13–0 record and win their 18th national title in program history.

In 2021, the two teams met again in the SEC Championship Game. Georgia was undefeated and ranked number one in the nation at the time while Alabama had one loss and was ranked number three. Alabama again prevailed, 41–24, this time dominating the majority of the game. Despite the loss, Georgia still qualified for the College Football Playoff thanks to #5 Oklahoma State losing to #9 Baylor in the Big 12 Championship, and each team prevailed in their national semifinal matchup, setting up a rematch in the national championship. This marked the shortest span between two successive matchups in the history of the teams' rivalry. Georgia won the national championship game at Lucas Oil Stadium in Indianapolis 33–18 for the Bulldogs' first national championship since 1980. This was also Georgia's first win over Alabama since September 22, 2007, snapping a seven-game losing streak. Georgia's win also marked the first time since conference championship games began to be played in 1992 that a team was the AP national champion after losing its respective conference championship game in the same season.

In 2023, the two teams met once again for the SEC Championship Game, with #1 Georgia meeting #8 Alabama. Georgia had entered the game with a 29-game winning streak, which had started after the Bulldogs' loss to Alabama in the 2021 SEC title game. In a close game, Alabama upset Georgia, 27–24, improving to 4–0 against the Bulldogs in SEC title games. Unlike in 2021 though, Georgia would not receive an invite to the College Football Playoff, and would be denied the opportunity to win three consecutive national titles. Alabama would lose in the College Football Playoff Semifinal to Michigan.

Following the 2023 season, Alabama head coach Nick Saban would retire from coaching, leaving Alabama with a record of 8–2 against Georgia. Alabama would hire Washington head coach Kalen DeBoer as Saban's replacement. In 2024, the two teams were scheduled to meet in the regular season for the first time in four years. The game was advertised as another marquee College GameDay matchup, with #4 Alabama hosting #2 Georgia, the seventh time in 12 years the two teams met both ranked in the top five. Georgia entered the game having not allowed a single touchdown through the first three weeks of the season, however, Alabama opened the game scoring 28 unanswered points. Georgia then answered by orchestrating a 28-point comeback, eventually leading 34–33 late in the fourth quarter. Alabama would then respond with a 75-yard, go-ahead touchdown and a subsequent interception off of Georgia to win the game, 41–34. The loss snapped Georgia's 42-game regular-season win streak.

The next season Georgia and Alabama played on September 27, 2025 in Athens, Georgia at Sanford Stadium where #17 Alabama defeated #5 Georgia, 24–21, ending Georgia’s 33 home game winning streak, with their last loss in Athens in 2019. The two teams rematched in the 2025 SEC Championship Game on December 6, 2025 at Mercedes-Benz Stadium in Atlanta, Georgia. UGA won the rematch 28–7 and allowed -3 rushing yards to hand Alabama its first SEC Championship loss since 2008.

On October 10, 2026, the game was advertised as another marquee College GameDay matchup, with #6 Alabama hosting #2 Georgia, as well as the second time in the series history that each team came in 5-0 or better. UGA beat Alabama 20–17 in Tuscaloosa, making it their first regular season win in Tuscaloosa since 2007.

== Game results ==
Alabama victories	Georgia victories	Tie games

No.	Date	Location	Winning team		Losing team	
1	November 2, 1895	Columbus, GA	Georgia	30	Alabama	6
2	November 9, 1901	Montgomery, AL	Tie	0	Tie	0
3	November 1, 1902	Birmingham, AL	Georgia	5	Alabama	0
4	November 5, 1904	Tuscaloosa, AL	Alabama	16	Georgia	5
5	November 4, 1905	Birmingham, AL	Alabama	36	Georgia	0
6	October 25, 1907	Montgomery, AL	Tie	0	Tie	0
7	November 14, 1908	Birmingham, AL	Tie	6	Tie	6
8	October 30, 1909	Atlanta, GA	Alabama	14	Georgia	0
9	October 15, 1910	Birmingham, AL	Georgia	22	Alabama	0
10	October 14, 1911	Birmingham, AL	Georgia	11	Alabama	3
11	October 26, 1912	Columbus, GA	Georgia	13	Alabama	9
12	October 18, 1913	Birmingham, AL	Georgia	20	Alabama	0
13	November 30, 1916	Birmingham, AL	Georgia	23	Alabama	0
14	November 22, 1919	Atlanta, GA	Alabama	6	Georgia	0
15	November 20, 1920	Atlanta, GA	Georgia	21	Alabama	14
16	November 19, 1921	Atlanta, GA	Georgia	22	Alabama	0
17	November 25, 1922	Montgomery, AL	Alabama	10	Georgia	6
18	November 24, 1923	Montgomery, AL	Alabama	36	Georgia	0
19	November 27, 1924	Birmingham, AL	Alabama	33	Georgia	0
20	November 26, 1925	Birmingham, AL	Alabama	27	Georgia	0
21	November 25, 1926	Birmingham, AL	Alabama	33	Georgia	6
22	November 24, 1927	Birmingham, AL	Georgia	20	Alabama	6
23	November 29, 1928	Birmingham, AL	Alabama	19	Georgia	0
24	November 28, 1929	Birmingham, AL	Georgia	12	Alabama	0
25	November 27, 1930	Birmingham, AL	Alabama	13	Georgia	0
26	October 27, 1934	Birmingham, AL	Alabama	26	Georgia	6
27	October 26, 1935	Athens, GA	Alabama	17	Georgia	7
28	October 25, 1941	Birmingham, AL	Alabama	27	Georgia	14
29	October 31, 1942	Atlanta, GA	#2 Georgia	21	#3 Alabama	10
30	November 4, 1944	Birmingham, AL	Georgia	14	#19 Alabama	7
31	October 27, 1945	Birmingham, AL	#6 Alabama	28	Georgia	14
32	November 2, 1946	Athens, GA	#5 Georgia	14	#15 Alabama	0
33	October 25, 1947	Athens, GA	Alabama	17	Georgia	7
34	October 30, 1948	Birmingham, AL	#18 Georgia	35	Alabama	0
35	October 29, 1949	Athens, GA	Alabama	14	Georgia	7
36	November 4, 1950	Birmingham, AL	Alabama	14	Georgia	7
37	November 3, 1951	Athens, GA	Alabama	16	Georgia	14
38	November 1, 1952	Birmingham, AL	#19 Alabama	34	Georgia	19
39	October 31, 1953	Athens, GA	Alabama	33	Georgia	12
40	October 30, 1954	Birmingham, AL	Tie	0	Tie	0

No.	Date	Location	Winning team		Losing team	
41	October 29, 1955	Athens, GA	Georgia	35	Alabama	14
42	November 3, 1956	Birmingham, AL	Georgia	16	Alabama	13
43	November 2, 1957	Athens, GA	Alabama	14	Georgia	13
44	November 1, 1958	Tuscaloosa, AL	Alabama	12	Georgia	0
45	September 19, 1959	Athens, GA	Georgia	17	Alabama	3
46	September 17, 1960	Birmingham, AL	Alabama	21	#13 Georgia	6
47	September 23, 1961	Athens, GA	#3 Alabama	32	Georgia	6
48	September 22, 1962	Birmingham, AL	#3 Alabama	35	Georgia	0
49	September 21, 1963	Athens, GA	#3 Alabama	32	Georgia	7
50	September 19, 1964	Tuscaloosa, AL	#6 Alabama	31	Georgia	3
51	September 18, 1965	Athens, GA	Georgia	18	#5 Alabama	17
52	October 7, 1972	Athens, GA	#4 Alabama	25	Georgia	7
53	October 6, 1973	Tuscaloosa, AL	#3 Alabama	28	Georgia	14
54	October 2, 1976	Athens, GA	#6 Georgia	21	#10 Alabama	0
55	October 1, 1977	Tuscaloosa, AL	#10 Alabama	18	Georgia	10
56	October 6, 1984	Birmingham, AL	#20 Georgia	24	Alabama	14
57	September 2, 1985	Athens, GA	Alabama	20	Georgia	16
58	September 22, 1990	Athens, GA	Georgia	17	Alabama	16
59	September 21, 1991	Tuscaloosa, AL	Alabama	10	#25 Georgia	0
60	October 1, 1994	Tuscaloosa, AL	#11 Alabama	29	Georgia	28
61	September 30, 1995	Athens, GA	#20 Alabama	31	Georgia	0
62	October 5, 2002	Tuscaloosa, AL	#7 Georgia	27	#22 Alabama	25
63	October 4, 2003	Athens, GA	#11 Georgia	37	Alabama	23
64	September 22, 2007	Tuscaloosa, AL	#22 Georgia	26	#16 Alabama	23^{OT}
65	September 27, 2008	Athens, GA	#8 Alabama	41	#3 Georgia	30
66	December 1, 2012*	Atlanta, GA	#2 Alabama	32	#3 Georgia	28
67	October 3, 2015	Athens, GA	#13 Alabama	38	#8 Georgia	10
68	January 8, 2018**	Atlanta, GA	#4 Alabama	26	#3 Georgia	23^{OT}
69	December 1, 2018*	Atlanta, GA	#1 Alabama	35	#4 Georgia	28
70	October 17, 2020	Tuscaloosa, AL	#2 Alabama	41	#3 Georgia	24
71	December 4, 2021*	Atlanta, GA	#3 Alabama	41	#1 Georgia	24
72	January 10, 2022**	Indianapolis, IN	#3 Georgia	33	#1 Alabama	18
73	December 2, 2023*	Atlanta, GA	#8 Alabama	27	#1 Georgia	24
74	September 28, 2024	Tuscaloosa, AL	#4 Alabama	41	#2 Georgia	34
75	September 27, 2025	Athens, GA	#17 Alabama	24	#5 Georgia	21
76	December 6, 2025*	Atlanta, GA	#3 Georgia	28	#9 Alabama	7
77	October 10, 2026	Tuscaloosa, AL	#2 Georgia	20	#6 Alabama	17
Series: Alabama leads 45–28–4
* indicates SEC Championship Game ** indicates National Championship Game

=== Record by location ===
As of October 10, 2026

State	City	Games	Alabama victories	Georgia victories	Ties	Years played
Alabama	Birmingham	26	13	11	2	1902–1916, 1924–1962, 1984
Alabama	Tuscaloosa	12	9	3	0	1904, 1958, 1964–present
Alabama	Montgomery	4	2	0	2	1901, 1907, 1922–23
Georgia	Athens	21	14	7	0	1935–present
Georgia	Atlanta	11	7	4	0	1909, 1919–21, 1942, 2012, 2018 (2), 2021, 2023, 2025
Georgia	Columbus	2	0	2	0	1895, 1912
Indiana	Indianapolis	1	0	1	0	2022

=== Record by game type ===
As of October 10, 2026

Game type	Games	Alabama victories	Georgia victories	Ties
Regular Season	70	40	26	4
As members of the Southeastern Conference (1931–present)	45	29	15	1
As members of the Southern Conference (1921–1931)	10	7	3	0
As independents (until 1920)	15	4	8	3
SEC Championship Game	5	4	1	0
CFP National Championship	2	1	1	0

=== Top-5 games ===
Since 1936, when the AP Poll began being released continuously, the Crimson Tide and Bulldogs have met 9 times when both have been ranked in the top 5. The first instance came in 1942, with the most recent in 2024. Alabama holds a 7–2 record in these top-5 meetings.

Year	Away team		Home team		Notes
1942	No. 3 Alabama	10	No. 2 Georgia	21	
2012	No. 3 Georgia	28	No. 2 Alabama	32	SEC CG
2018	No. 4 Alabama	26	No. 3 Georgia	23	2017 NCG; OT
2018	No. 4 Georgia	28	No. 1 Alabama	35	SEC CG
2020	No. 3 Georgia	24	No. 2 Alabama	41	
2021	No. 3 Alabama	41	No. 1 Georgia	24	SEC CG
2022	No. 3 Georgia	33	No. 1 Alabama	18	2021 NCG
2024	No. 2 Georgia	34	No. 4 Alabama	41	

== Coaching records ==
As of October 13th, 2026

=== Alabama ===
Head Coach	Games	Seasons	Wins	Losses	Ties	Win %
Kalen Deboer	4	2024–present	2	2	0	0.500
Nick Saban	10	2007–2023	8	2	0	0.833
Mike Shula	1	2003–2006	0	1	0	0.000
Dennis Franchione	1	2001–2002	0	1	0	0.000
Gene Stallings	4	1990–1996	3	1	0	0.750
Ray Perkins	2	1983–1986	1	1	0	0.500
Bear Bryant	12	1958–1982	9	3	0	0.750
Jennings B. Whitworth	3	1955–1957	1	2	0	0.333
Harold Drew	8	1947–1954	6	1	1	0.812
Frank Thomas	7	1931–1946	4	3	0	0.517
Wallace Wade	8	1923–1930	6	2	0	0.750
Xen Scott	4	1919–1922	2	2	0	0.500
Thomas Kelley	1	1915–1917	0	1	0	0.000
D.V. Graves	3	1911–1914	0	3	0	0.000
Guy Lowman	1	1910	0	1	0	0.000
J. W. H. Pollard	2	1906–1909	1	0	2	0.666
Jack Leavenworth	1	1905	1	0	0	1.000
W. A. Blount	1	1903–1904	1	0	0	1.000
Eli Abbott	2	1893–1895, 1902	0	2	0	0.000
M. S. Harvey	1	1901	0	0	1	0.500

=== Georgia ===
Head Coach	Games	Seasons	Wins	Losses	Ties	Win %
Kirby Smart	10	2016–present	3	7	0	0.300
Mark Richt	6	2001–2015	3	3	0	0.500
Ray Goff	4	1989–1995	1	3	0	0.250
Vince Dooley	8	1964–1988	3	5	0	0.375
Johnny Griffith	3	1961–1963	0	3	0	0.000
Wally Butts	19	1939–1960	7	11	1	0.394
Harry Mehre	5	1928–1937	1	4	0	0.200
George Cecil Woodruff	5	1923–1927	1	4	0	0.200
Herman Stegeman	3	1920–1922	2	1	0	0.666
W.A. Cunningham	6	1910–1916, 1919	5	1	0	0.833
Frank Dobson	1	1909	0	1	0	0.000
Branch Bocock	1	1908	0	0	1	0.500
George S. Whitney	1	1906–1907	0	0	1	0.500
Marvin D. Dickinson	1	1903, 1905	0	1	0	0.000
Charles A Barnard	1	1904	0	1	0	0.000
William A. Reynolds	2	1901–1902	1	0	1	0.750
Pop Warner	1	1895–1896	1	0	0	1.000

== See also ==
- List of NCAA college football rivalry games
