= 1904 Vanderbilt Commodores football team =

American college football season

1904 Vanderbilt Commodores football
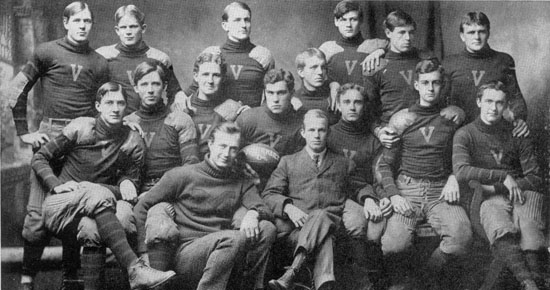

SIAA champion
- Conference: Southern Intercollegiate Athletic Association
- Record: 9–0 (5–0 SIAA)
- Head coach: Dan McGugin (1st season)
- Offensive scheme: Short punt
- Captain: Irish Graham
- Home stadium: Dudley Field

1904 Southern Intercollegiate Athletic Association football standings
	Conf.					Overall
Team	W		L		T	W		L		T
Vanderbilt +	5	–	0	–	0	9	–	0	–	0
Auburn +	5	–	0	–	0	5	–	0	–	0
Sewanee	4	–	1	–	0	7	–	1	–	0
Georgia Tech	3	–	1	–	1	8	–	1	–	1
Alabama	5	–	3	–	0	7	–	3	–	0
Clemson	3	–	2	–	1	3	–	3	–	1
Tulane	3	–	2	–	0	5	–	2	–	0
Kentucky State	0	–	0	–	0	9	–	1	–	0
Ole Miss	2	–	3	–	0	4	–	3	–	0
LSU	1	–	2	–	0	3	–	4	–	0
Tennessee	1	–	4	–	1	3	–	5	–	1
Cumberland (TN)	0	–	1	–	0	2	–	1	–	0
Nashville	0	–	4	–	1	2	–	5	–	1
Georgia	0	–	4	–	0	1	–	5	–	0
Mississippi A&M	0	–	4	–	0	2	–	4	–	0
+ – Conference co-champions

The 1904 Vanderbilt Commodores football team represented Vanderbilt University during the 1904 Southern Intercollegiate Athletic Association football season. The team's head coach was Dan McGugin, who served his first season in that capacity. Members of the Southern Intercollegiate Athletic Association, the Commodores played six home games in Nashville, Tennessee and finished the season with a record of 9–0.

The 1904 Vanderbilt team scored an average of 52.7 points per game, the most in college football that season, and allowed just four points, all surrendered in their game against Missouri-Rolla. The team had a strong claim to the Southern championship, as the elevens of Georgetown and Virginia played few southern schools.

== Schedule ==
Date	Opponent	Site	Result	Attendance	Source
October 1	vs. Mississippi A&M	Columbus Fairgrounds; Columbus, MS	W 61–0		
October 8	Georgetown (KY)*	Dudley Field; Nashville, TN	W 66–0		
October 15	Ole Miss	Dudley Field; Nashville, TN (rivalry)	W 69–0		
October 22	Missouri Mines*	Dudley Field; Nashville, TN	W 29–4		
October 29	Central University*	Dudley Field; Nashville, TN	W 97–0		
November 5	Tennessee	Dudley Field; Nashville, TN (rivalry)	W 22–0		
November 12	Nashville	Dudley Field; Nashville, TN	W 81–0	2,500	
November 19	at Central (KY)*	Richmond, KY	W 22–0		
November 24	Sewanee	Dudley Field; Nashville, TN (rivalry)	W 27–0	6,500	
*Non-conference game

== Before the season ==
The Commodores hired former Michigan guard Dan McGugin, a protege and son-in-law of Michigan coach Fielding H. Yost. Like Yost, McGugin utilized a short punt formation. Sportswriter Fuzzy Woodruff once wrote "The plain facts of the business are that McGugin stood out in the South like Gulliver among the native sons of Lilliput... There was no foeman worthy of the McGugin steel."

Vanderbilt alumnus Myles P. O'Connor wrote of Dan Blake, who "played left half for Vanderbilt, '04, being taken from left end, which position he played in '03. End is his position; he is heavy, weighing about 170, is fast, a good tackler, advances the ball well, and is a fair punter."

== Game summaries ==
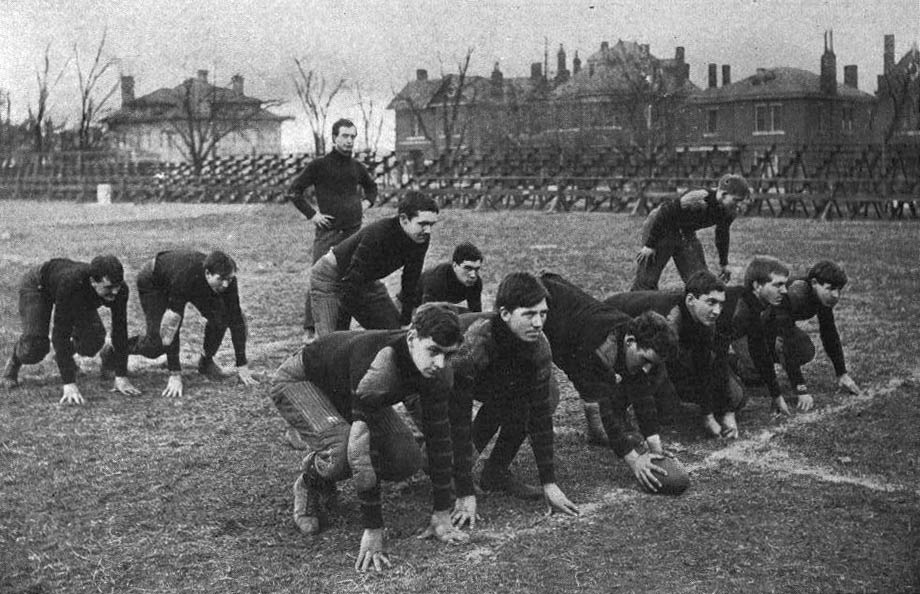
The team in action.

=== Mississippi A&M ===
In his first career game, McGugin's team defeated Mississippi A&M, 61–0.

=== Georgetown ===
In the second week of play, Georgetown of Kentucky was defeated 66–0.

=== Ole Miss ===
Vanderbilt defeated Ole Miss, 69–0. Both sides had players removed for roughness. "The whole South read that 69–0 score and gasped." McGugin remains the only coach in NCAA history to win his first three games by 60 points.

The starting lineup was D. Blake (left end), Taylor (left tackle), Sibley (left guard), Stone (center), Brown (right guard), Graham (right tackle), I. Brown (right end), Kyle (quarterback), Costen (left halfback), Craig (right halfback), Hamilton (fullback).

=== Missouri Mines ===
Missouri Mines at Vanderbilt

Team	1	2	Total
Missouri	4	0	4
• Vanderbilt	29	0	29

- Date: October 22
- Location: Curry Field • Nashville, Tennessee
- Referee: Bradley Walker

The Commodores beat the Missouri Mines 29–4. All scoring was done in the first half. The Missouri school once got the ball on Vanderbilt's 8-yard line. Unable to go any further, Wilson dropped back and made an 18-yard drop kick, the only points scored on the Commodores all season.

The starting lineup was I. Brown (left end), Taylor (left tackle), Pritchard (left guard), Stone (center), Sibley (right guard), Graham (right tackle), Costen (right end), Kyle (quarterback), Blake (left halfback), Craig (right halfback), Hamilton (fullback).

=== Centre ===
Vanderbilt easily beat Centre 97–0. The first score came on Vanderbilt's kickoff to Centre. Dan Blake recovered the ball for a touchdown.

The starting lineup was I. Brown (left end), Taylor (left tackle), Pritchard (left guard), Patterson (center), B. Brown (right guard), Graham (right tackle), Hamilton (right end), Haygood (quarterback), Blake (left halfback), Craig (right halfback), Manier (fullback).

=== Tennessee ===
The Commodores defeated the rival Vols 22–0. Ed Hamilton and Manier alternated against Jones Beene, easily taking care of him.

The starting lineup was I. Brown (left end), Taylor (left tackle), Pritchard (left guard), Patterson (center), B. Brown (right guard), Graham (right tackle), Hamilton (right end), Haygood (quarterback), Blake (left halfback), Craig (right halfback), Manier (fullback).

=== Nashville ===
Nashville vs. Vanderbilt

Team	1	2	Total
Nashville	0	0	0
• Vanderbilt	40	41	81

- Date: November 12
- Location: Curry Field • Nashville, Tennessee
- Game attendance: 2,500
- Referee: Z. N. Estes

Vanderbilt defeated the Nashville Garnet and Blue 81–0. Capt Biddle of the Nashville team said "We were outclassed too far in weight, besides were not as aggressive as Vanderbilt. Their line bucking was not to be denied, and after they had thrown their weight on our line, it weakened and went to pieces."

The starting lineup was I. Brown (left end), Taylor (left tackle), Stone (left guard), Patterson (center), B. Brown (right guard), Graham (right tackle), Hamilton (right end), Haygood (quarterback), Blake (left halfback), Craig (right halfback), Manier (fullback).

=== Central ===
Vanderbilt then beat Central 22–0.

=== Sewanee ===
Vanderbilt faced rival and previously undefeated Sewanee Tigers for the championship of the south. Vanderbilt won 27–0. Vanderbilt's backfield starred. Dan Blake had many gains, and Honus Craig twice had his jersey torn from his body. The 6,500 attendants made the crowd a sea of colors.

The starting lineup was I. Brown (left end), Taylor (left tackle), Stone (left guard), Patterson (center), T. Brown (right guard), Graham (right tackle), Hamilton (right end), Kyle (quarterback), Blake (left halfback), Craig (right halfback), Manier (fullback).

== Postseason ==
A postseason match between Vanderbilt and Auburn to decide a Southern championship was forbidden by the SIAA.

== Personnel ==
=== Line ===
Player	Position	Games started	Hometown	Prep school	Height	Weight	Age
Innis Brown	End	8	Franklin, Tennessee	Mooney School	5'10"	166	20
J. Hamilton "Bull" Brown	Guard	7					
Irish Graham	Tackle	8	Nashville, Tennessee		6'1"	172	21
Owsley Manier	End	8	Nashville, Tennessee	Wallace University School	6'2"	170	17
Emma Patterson	Center	4			5'11"	177	
Joe Pritchard	Tackle, guard	5	Franklin, Tennessee	Mooney School	6'2"	196	18
Jesse Sibley	Guard	5	Shelbyville, Kentucky				
Stein Stone	Center, guard	6	Nashville, Tennessee	Mooney School	6'3"	175	20
Hillsman Taylor	Tackle	8	Trenton, Tennessee		6'1"	182	20

=== Backfield ===
Player	Position	Games started	Hometown	Prep school	Height	Weight	Age
Sam Costen	Halfback	7	McKenzie, Tennessee			150	22
Honus Craig	Halfback	8	Culleoka, Tennessee	Branham & Hughes School	5'9"	168	20
Jimmy R. Haygood	Quarterback	3					
Ed Hamilton	Fullback	8	Franklin, Tennessee	Mooney School	5'11"	164	
Frank Kyle	Quarterback	5		Mooney School	5'11"	162	22

=== Depth chart ===
The following chart provides a visual depiction of Vanderbilt's lineup during the 1904 season with games started at the position reflected in parentheses. The chart mimics a short punt formation while on offense, with the quarterback under center.

LE
Innis Brown (8)
Dan Blake (1)

LT	LG	C	RG	RT
Hillsman Taylor (8)	Joe Pritchard (3)	Stein Stone (5)	J. Hamilton Brown (7)	Irish Graham (8)
	Stein Stone (2)	Emma Patterson (4)	Jesse Sibley (1)	
	Jesse Sibley (1)			

RE
Owsley Manier (6)
Innis Brown (1)
Sam Costen (1)
Ed Hamilton (1)

QB
Frank Kyle (3)
Jimmy R. Haygood (3)

LHB	RHB
Dan Blake (5)	Honus Craig (8)
Sam Costen (1)	

FB
Ed Hamilton (8)
Owsley Manier (1)

-

== Bibliography ==
- Scott, Richard (2008). SEC Football: 75 Years of Pride and Passion. Minneapolis: Voyageur.
- Vanderbilt University (1905). Vanderbilt University Quarterly. Vol. 5.
- Woodruff, Fuzzy (1928). A History of Southern Football 1890–1928. Vol. 1.
