= 1904 Clemson Tigers football team =

American college football season

1904 Clemson Tigers football
- Conference: Southern Intercollegiate Athletic Association
- Record: 3–3–1 (3–2–1 SIAA)
- Head coach: Shack Shealy (1st season)
- Captain: Joe Holland
- Home stadium: Bowman Field

1904 Southern Intercollegiate Athletic Association football standings
	Conf.					Overall
Team	W		L		T	W		L		T
Vanderbilt +	5	–	0	–	0	9	–	0	–	0
Auburn +	5	–	0	–	0	5	–	0	–	0
Sewanee	4	–	1	–	0	7	–	1	–	0
Georgia Tech	3	–	1	–	1	8	–	1	–	1
Alabama	5	–	3	–	0	7	–	3	–	0
Clemson	3	–	2	–	1	3	–	3	–	1
Tulane	3	–	2	–	0	5	–	2	–	0
Kentucky State	0	–	0	–	0	9	–	1	–	0
Ole Miss	2	–	3	–	0	4	–	3	–	0
LSU	1	–	2	–	0	3	–	4	–	0
Tennessee	1	–	4	–	1	3	–	5	–	1
Cumberland (TN)	0	–	1	–	0	2	–	1	–	0
Nashville	0	–	4	–	1	2	–	5	–	1
Georgia	0	–	4	–	0	1	–	5	–	0
Mississippi A&M	0	–	4	–	0	2	–	4	–	0
+ – Conference co-champions

The 1904 Clemson Tigers football team represented Clemson Agricultural College—now known as Clemson University—during the 1904 Southern Intercollegiate Athletic Association football season. Under first-year head coach Shack Shealy, the team posted a 3–3–1 record. Joe Holland was the team captain.

== Schedule ==
Date	Opponent	Site	Result	Attendance	Source
October 8	at Alabama	West End Park; Birmingham, AL (rivalry)	W 18–0		
October 15	Auburn	Bowman Field; Calhoun, SC (rivalry)	L 0–5		
October 22	Georgia	Bowman Field; Calhoun, SC (rivalry)	W 10–0		
October 27	vs. Sewanee	Columbia, SC	L 5–11	5,000	
November 5	at Georgia Tech	Piedmont Park; Atlanta, GA (rivalry)	T 11–11		
November 12	at Tennessee	Baldwin Park; Knoxville, TN	W 6–0		
November 24	at North Carolina A&M*	State Fairgrounds; Raleigh, NC (rivalry)	L 0–18		
*Non-conference game
