= 1902 Cumberland Bulldogs football team =

American college football season

1902 Cumberland Bulldogs football
- Conference: Southern Intercollegiate Athletic Association
- Record: 3–5 (1–4 SIAA)
- Head coach: A. L. Phillips (1st season)
- Captain: R. W. Keeton

1902 Southern Intercollegiate Athletic Association football standings
	Conf.					Overall
Team	W		L		T	W		L		T
Clemson $	5	–	0	–	0	6	–	1	–	0
Vanderbilt	6	–	1	–	0	8	–	1	–	0
LSU +	5	–	1	–	0	6	–	1	–	0
Texas	4	–	1	–	0	6	–	3	–	1
Sewanee	4	–	2	–	0	6	–	2	–	0
Tennessee	4	–	2	–	0	6	–	2	–	0
Georgia	3	–	2	–	1	4	–	2	–	1
Ole Miss	3	–	3	–	0	4	–	3	–	0
Nashville	2	–	2	–	0	2	–	4	–	0
Auburn	2	–	4	–	1	2	–	4	–	1
Alabama	2	–	4	–	0	4	–	4	–	0
Cumberland (TN)	1	–	4	–	0	3	–	5	–	0
Tulane	0	–	3	–	2	1	–	4	–	2
Furman	0	–	2	–	1	4	–	3	–	4
Georgia Tech	0	–	4	–	2	0	–	6	–	2
Mississippi A&M	0	–	4	–	1	1	–	4	–	1
Kentucky State	0	–	2	–	0	4	–	6	–	1
$ – Conference champion; + LSU claims a co-championship

The 1902 Cumberland Bulldogs football team represented Cumberland University in the 1902 Southern Intercollegiate Athletic Association football season. The team was a member of the Southern Intercollegiate Athletic Association (SIAA).

== Schedule ==
Date	Opponent	Site	Result	Source
September 20	Mooney		L 0–15	
September 27	Vanderbilt	Lebanon, TN	L 0–45	
October 8	at Nashville	Peabody Field; Nashville, TN	L 0–11	
October 17	at Mississippi A&M	Starkville Fairgrounds; Starkville, MS	W 16–5	
October 18	at Ole Miss	Oxford, MS	L 0–38	
November 8	Bethel (KY)	Lebanon, TN	W 48–0	
November 15	South Kentucky	Lebanon, TN	W 80–0	
November 21	at Sewanee	Hardee Field; Sewanee, TN	L 0–22	
