= 1904 Kentucky State College Blue and White football team =

American college football season

1904 Kentucky State College Blue and White football
- Conference: Southern Intercollegiate Athletic Association
- Record: 9–1 (0–0 SIAA)
- Head coach: Fred Schacht (1st season)
- Captain: J. White Guyn
- Home stadium: State College Athletic Park

1904 Southern Intercollegiate Athletic Association football standings
	Conf.					Overall
Team	W		L		T	W		L		T
Vanderbilt +	5	–	0	–	0	9	–	0	–	0
Auburn +	5	–	0	–	0	5	–	0	–	0
Sewanee	4	–	1	–	0	7	–	1	–	0
Georgia Tech	3	–	1	–	1	8	–	1	–	1
Alabama	5	–	3	–	0	7	–	3	–	0
Clemson	3	–	2	–	1	3	–	3	–	1
Tulane	3	–	2	–	0	5	–	2	–	0
Kentucky State	0	–	0	–	0	9	–	1	–	0
Ole Miss	2	–	3	–	0	4	–	3	–	0
LSU	1	–	2	–	0	3	–	4	–	0
Tennessee	1	–	4	–	1	3	–	5	–	1
Cumberland (TN)	0	–	1	–	0	2	–	1	–	0
Nashville	0	–	4	–	1	2	–	5	–	1
Georgia	0	–	4	–	0	1	–	5	–	0
Mississippi A&M	0	–	4	–	0	2	–	4	–	0
+ – Conference co-champions

The 1904 Kentucky State College Blue and White football team represented Kentucky State College—now known as the University of Kentucky—during the 1904 Southern Intercollegiate Athletic Association football season. Led by first-year head coach Fred Schacht, the Blue and White compiled an overall record of 9–1.

== Schedule ==
Date	Opponent	Site	Result	Attendance	Source
September 30	Paris A. C.*	State College Athletic Park; Lexington, KY	W 28–0		
October 8	at Indiana*	Jordan Field; Bloomington, IN (rivalry)	W 12–0		
October 12	at Central University (KY)*	Danville, KY (rivalry)	W 40–0		
October 15	Berea*	State College Athletic Park; Lexington, KY	W 42–0		
October 18	Bethany (WV)*	State College Athletic Park; Lexington, KY	W 6–0		
October 22	at Cincinnati*	League Park; Cincinnati, OH	L 0–11		
November 5	Kentucky Military Institute*	State College Athletic Park; Lexington, KY	W 11–0		
November 12	at Georgetown (KY)*	Georgetown, KY	W 35–0		
November 19	Central University (KY)*	State College Athletic Park; Lexington, KY	W 81–0		
November 24	Kentucky University*	State College Athletic Park; Lexington, KY (rivalry)	W 22–4	4,000	
*Non-conference game
