= 1904 Auburn Tigers football team =

American college football season

1904 Auburn Tigers football
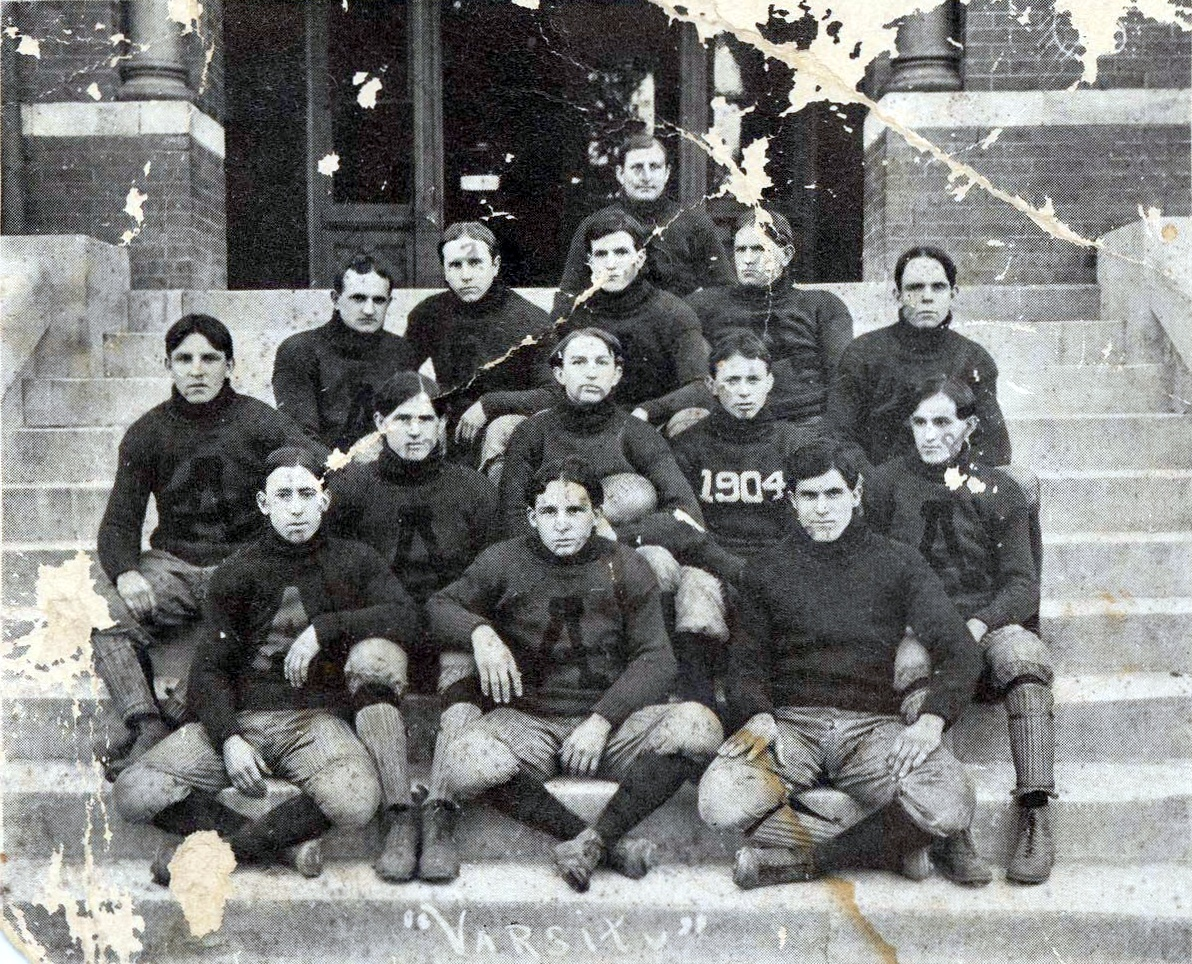
- 1904 Auburn football team; head coach Mike Donahue is in the second row with "1904" on his jersey

SIAA co-champion
- Conference: Southern Intercollegiate Athletic Association
- Record: 5–0 (5–0 SIAA)
- Head coach: Mike Donahue (1st season)
- Captain: R. S. Reynolds

1904 Southern Intercollegiate Athletic Association football standings
	Conf.					Overall
Team	W		L		T	W		L		T
Vanderbilt +	5	–	0	–	0	9	–	0	–	0
Auburn +	5	–	0	–	0	5	–	0	–	0
Sewanee	4	–	1	–	0	7	–	1	–	0
Georgia Tech	3	–	1	–	1	8	–	1	–	1
Alabama	5	–	3	–	0	7	–	3	–	0
Clemson	3	–	2	–	1	3	–	3	–	1
Tulane	3	–	2	–	0	5	–	2	–	0
Kentucky State	0	–	0	–	0	9	–	1	–	0
Ole Miss	2	–	3	–	0	4	–	3	–	0
LSU	1	–	2	–	0	3	–	4	–	0
Tennessee	1	–	4	–	1	3	–	5	–	1
Cumberland (TN)	0	–	1	–	0	2	–	1	–	0
Nashville	0	–	4	–	1	2	–	5	–	1
Georgia	0	–	4	–	0	1	–	5	–	0
Mississippi A&M	0	–	4	–	0	2	–	4	–	0
+ – Conference co-champions

The 1904 Auburn Tigers football team represented Auburn University in the 1904 Southern Intercollegiate Athletic Association football season.

The team went undefeated, winning all five of its regular season games. It also won two "practice" games against Montgomery and the University of Florida. The Tigers defense was nearly perfect, outscoring opponents 73–11 in regular season play and completing three shut outs (five counting the practice games). This was the first undefeated Auburn team since 1900 and was the fourth time the Tigers went undefeated.

The squad was coached by Mike Donahue in his first year as a head football coach. Donahue coached two separate times at Auburn (1904–1906 and 1908–1922) before moving to LSU. He also served as athletic director, basketball coach, baseball coach, and track coach during his tenure. Donahue still ranks second on Auburn football coaches' all-time career win list and third in winning percentage.

== Before the season ==
Auburn hired former Yale multi-sport athlete Mike Donahue to be the programs' tenth head coach. The native of Ireland would coach the Tigers for 18 seasons and still owns the highest winning percentage of any full-time Auburn football coach.

Humphrey Foy recovered from a broken collarbone sustained the previous season and returned to the starting lineup.

== Schedule ==
Date	Opponent	Site	Result	Source
October 4	University of Florida (Lake City)‡*	Drill Field; Auburn, AL	W 44–0	
October 15	at Clemson	Bowman Field; Clemson, SC (rivalry)	W 5–0	
October 22	vs. Nashville	West End Park; Birmingham, AL	W 10–0	
October 29	Georgia Tech	Drill Field; Auburn, AL (rivalry)	W 12–0	
November 12	vs. Alabama	West End Park; Birmingham, AL (rivalry)	W 29–5	
November 24	vs. Georgia	Central City Park; Macon, GA (rivalry)	W 17–6	
*Non-conference game; Source:

‡The October 4, 1904, game against the University of Florida at Lake City was considered a practice game by Auburn and is not included in the official record of 5–0 for the season. The university at Lake City was one of four colleges which would later be merged to form the University of Florida in Gainesville, which established its own football program in 1906.

== Game summaries ==
=== At Clemson ===
Auburn at Clemson

Team	1	2	Total
• Auburn	5	0	5
Clemson	0	0	0

- Date: October 15
- Location: Clemson, SC
- Referee: Sandy Beaver

"The game was slow. Neither team was at its best." Humphrey Foy went around end on a double pass for an 18-yard touchdown, the game's only score. "Referee Beaver says it was one of the fiercest of games and that Clemson's defense was superb but the team lacked snap and ginger."

The starting lineup was Wilkinson (left end), Streit (left tackle), Ringey (left guard), Butler (center), Moon (right guard), Jones (right tackle), Paterson (right end), Perkins (quarterback), Foy (left halfback), Reynolds (right halfback), Lacey (fullback).

=== Nashville ===
Auburn easily defeated Nashville 10–0. Foy ran the second half kick off back for a touchdown. "Foy and Reynolds gained ground every time they were given the ball...The Auburn team is 50 per cent stronger now than it was at this time last year, and Coach Donohue is doing wonderful work with his material."

The starting lineup was Paterson (left end), Streit (left tackle), Bigney (left guard), Butler (center), Moon (right guard), Jones (right tackle), Wilkinson (right end), Perkins (quarterback), Foy (left halfback), Reynolds (right halfback), Lacey (fullback).

=== Georgia Tech ===
Georgia Tech at Auburn

Team	1	2	Total
Ga Tech	0	0	0
• Auburn	12	0	12

- Date: October 29
- Location: Auburn, AL

Donahue's Auburn team beat first year head coach John Heisman's Georgia Tech 12–0, making two touchdowns in the first half.

The starting lineup was Wilkinson (left end), Street (left tackle), Braswell (left guard), Butler (center), Moon (right guard), Jones (right tackle), Patterson (right end), Perkins (quarterback), Reynolds (left halfback), Foy (right halfback), Lacey (fullback).

=== Alabama ===
Auburn beat Alabama 29–6. Auburn used a delayed buck effectively. On this play, blockers swept around end, faking the ball. The ball carrier then drove through the line for substantial gains.

=== Georgia ===
Auburn at Georgia

Team	1	2	Total
• Auburn	12	5	17
Georgia	5	0	5

- Date: November 24
- Location: Macon, GA
- Referee: Butler (North Carolina)

Auburn closed the undefeated season with a 17–5 win over the Georgia Bulldogs. For the first score, Lacey ran in a 5-yard touchdown. Georgia answered with its own score. Lacey drove in another touchdown later, before the half ended. Lacey again got a 5-yard touchdown in the second half to make it 17–5.

The starting lineup was Paterson (left end), Streit (left tackle), Braswell (left guard), Butler (center), Moon (right guard), Hughes (right tackle), Wilkinson (right end), Perkins (quarterback), Foy (left halfback), Reynolds (right halfback), Lacey (fullback).

== Postseason ==
Humphrey Foy was All-Southern.
