= 1904 Mississippi A&M Aggies football team =

American college football season

1904 Mississippi A&M Aggies football
- Conference: Southern Intercollegiate Athletic Association
- Record: 2–4 (0–4 SIAA)
- Head coach: Daniel S. Martin (2nd season)
- Home stadium: Starkville Fairgrounds, Columbus Fairgrounds

1904 Southern Intercollegiate Athletic Association football standings
	Conf.					Overall
Team	W		L		T	W		L		T
Vanderbilt +	5	–	0	–	0	9	–	0	–	0
Auburn +	5	–	0	–	0	5	–	0	–	0
Sewanee	4	–	1	–	0	7	–	1	–	0
Georgia Tech	3	–	1	–	1	8	–	1	–	1
Alabama	5	–	3	–	0	7	–	3	–	0
Clemson	3	–	2	–	1	3	–	3	–	1
Tulane	3	–	2	–	0	5	–	2	–	0
Kentucky State	0	–	0	–	0	9	–	1	–	0
Ole Miss	2	–	3	–	0	4	–	3	–	0
LSU	1	–	2	–	0	3	–	4	–	0
Tennessee	1	–	4	–	1	3	–	5	–	1
Cumberland (TN)	0	–	1	–	0	2	–	1	–	0
Nashville	0	–	4	–	1	2	–	5	–	1
Georgia	0	–	4	–	0	1	–	5	–	0
Mississippi A&M	0	–	4	–	0	2	–	4	–	0
+ – Conference co-champions

The 1904 Mississippi A&M Aggies football team represented The Agricultural and Mechanical College of the State of Mississippi (now known as Mississippi State University) as a member of the Southern Intercollegiate Athletic Association (SIAA) during the 1904 college football season. Led by second-year head coach Daniel S. Martin, the Aggies compiled an overall record of 2–4 with a mark of 0–4 in conference play.

== Schedule ==
Date	Opponent	Site	Result	Attendance	Source
October 1	Vanderbilt	Columbus Fairgrounds; Columbus, MS	L 0–30		
October 15	Alabama	Columbus Fairgrounds; Columbus, MS (rivalry)	L 5–10		
October 22	Ole Miss	Columbus Fairgrounds; Columbus, MS (rivalry)	L 5–17		
October 29	at Tulane	Athletic Park; New Orleans, LA	L 0–10	1,100	
November 11	Tennessee Docs*	Starkville Fairgrounds; Starkville, MS	W 59–0		
November 19	Louisiana Industrial*	Starkville Fairgrounds; Starkville, MS	W 32–5		
*Non-conference game
