= Joe Holland (baseball) =

American baseball player

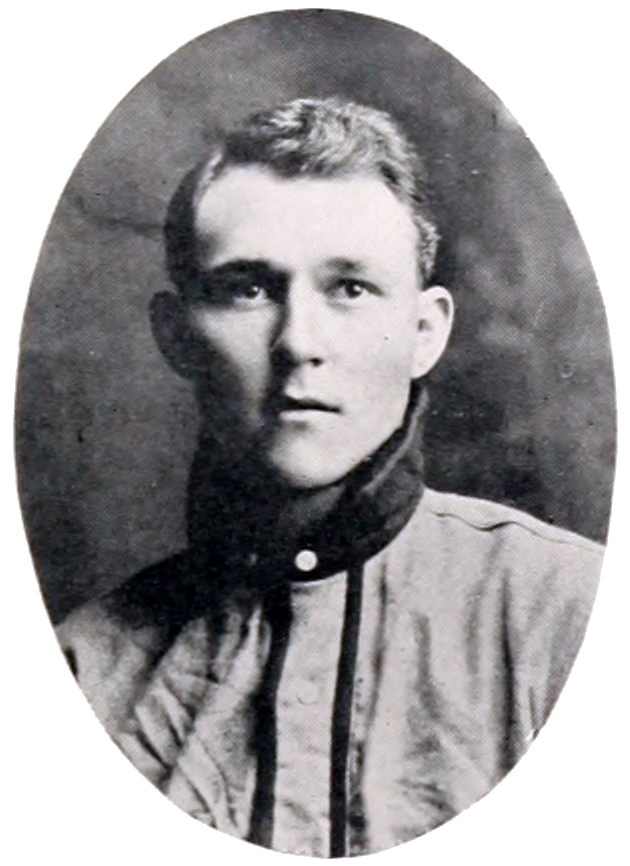

Biographical details
- Born: December 8, 1884
- Died: December 8, 1955 (aged 71); Augusta, Georgia, U.S.
- Education: Clemson College

Playing career
- 1904: Clemson
- Position: Fullback

Coaching career (HC unless noted)
- 1910: Clemson

Head coaching record
- Overall: 10–11

Accomplishments and honors

Awards
- All-Southern football player (1904)

Joseph Gordon Holland (December 8, 1884 – December 8, 1955) was a college football and baseball player as well as baseball coach. He coached at his alma mater Clemson College in 1910, leading the Clemson Tigers baseball team to a 10–11 record. Holland was an All-Southern fullback for the football team in 1904, selected such by former Clemson coach John Heisman, during a year in which he was a sophomore captain. He missed both extra points against Georgia. Holland also played 7 seasons of minor league baseball, including 69 games for the San Francisco Seals of the Pacific Coast League in 1911.
