= 1904 Ole Miss Rebels football team =

American college football season

1904 Ole Miss Rebels football
- Conference: Southern Intercollegiate Athletic Association
- Record: 4–3 (2–3 SIAA)
- Head coach: M. S. Harvey (2nd season)

1904 Southern Intercollegiate Athletic Association football standings
	Conf.					Overall
Team	W		L		T	W		L		T
Vanderbilt +	5	–	0	–	0	9	–	0	–	0
Auburn +	5	–	0	–	0	5	–	0	–	0
Sewanee	4	–	1	–	0	7	–	1	–	0
Georgia Tech	3	–	1	–	1	8	–	1	–	1
Alabama	5	–	3	–	0	7	–	3	–	0
Clemson	3	–	2	–	1	3	–	3	–	1
Tulane	3	–	2	–	0	5	–	2	–	0
Kentucky State	0	–	0	–	0	9	–	1	–	0
Ole Miss	2	–	3	–	0	4	–	3	–	0
LSU	1	–	2	–	0	3	–	4	–	0
Tennessee	1	–	4	–	1	3	–	5	–	1
Cumberland (TN)	0	–	1	–	0	2	–	1	–	0
Nashville	0	–	4	–	1	2	–	5	–	1
Georgia	0	–	4	–	0	1	–	5	–	0
Mississippi A&M	0	–	4	–	0	2	–	4	–	0
+ – Conference co-champions

The 1904 Ole Miss Rebels football team represented the University of Mississippi during the 1904 Southern Intercollegiate Athletic Association football season. The season was up-and-down, featuring a 69–0 loss to SIAA champion Vanderbilt and 114–0 defeat of Southwestern Baptist.

== Schedule ==
Date	Opponent	Site	Result	Source
October 15	at Vanderbilt	Dudley Field; Nashville, TN (rivalry)	L 0–69	
October 22	at Mississippi A&M	Columbus Fairgrounds; Columbus, MS (Egg Bowl)	W 17–5	
October 29	Southwestern Baptist*	University Park; Oxford, MS	W 114–0	
November 5	at LSU	State Field; Baton Rouge, LA (rivalry)	L 0–5	
November 12	vs. Tennessee Docs*	League Park; Jackson, MS	W 42–0	
November 19	vs. Nashville	Citizens Park; Memphis, TN	W 12–5	
November 24	at Tulane	Athletic Park; New Orleans, LA (rivalry)	L 0–22	
*Non-conference game
