= 1904 Georgia Bulldogs football team =

American college football season

1904 Georgia Bulldogs football
- Conference: Southern Intercollegiate Athletic Association
- Record: 1–5 (0–4 SIAA)
- Head coach: Charles A. Barnard (1st season)
- Captain: H. I. Killorain
- Home stadium: Herty Field

1904 Southern Intercollegiate Athletic Association football standings
	Conf.					Overall
Team	W		L		T	W		L		T
Vanderbilt +	5	–	0	–	0	9	–	0	–	0
Auburn +	5	–	0	–	0	5	–	0	–	0
Sewanee	4	–	1	–	0	7	–	1	–	0
Georgia Tech	3	–	1	–	1	8	–	1	–	1
Alabama	5	–	3	–	0	7	–	3	–	0
Clemson	3	–	2	–	1	3	–	3	–	1
Tulane	3	–	2	–	0	5	–	2	–	0
Kentucky State	0	–	0	–	0	9	–	1	–	0
Ole Miss	2	–	3	–	0	4	–	3	–	0
LSU	1	–	2	–	0	3	–	4	–	0
Tennessee	1	–	4	–	1	3	–	5	–	1
Cumberland (TN)	0	–	1	–	0	2	–	1	–	0
Nashville	0	–	4	–	1	2	–	5	–	1
Georgia	0	–	4	–	0	1	–	5	–	0
Mississippi A&M	0	–	4	–	0	2	–	4	–	0
+ – Conference co-champions

The 1904 Georgia Bulldogs football team represented the University of Georgia during the 1904 Southern Intercollegiate Athletic Association football season. The Bulldogs completed the season with a 1–5 record. After a victory in the first game of the season against the University of Florida, the team lost five straight, including losses to rivals Georgia Tech and Auburn. Georgia also lost its fifth game in a row to Clemson to close the season.

== Schedule ==
Date	Opponent	Site	Result	Source
October 15	vs. University of Florida*	Macon, GA	W 52–0	
October 22	at Clemson	Bowman Field; Calhoun, SC (rivalry)	L 0–10	
October 26	at South Carolina*	Columbia, SC (rivalry)	L 0–2	
November 5	Alabama	The Quad; Tuscaloosa, AL (rivalry)	L 5–16	
November 12	at Georgia Tech	Piedmont Park; Atlanta, GA (rivalry)	L 6–23	
November 24	vs. Auburn	Central City Park; Macon, GA (Deep South's Oldest Rivalry)	L 5–17	
*Non-conference game
