= 1904 Tulane Olive and Blue football team =

American college football season

1904 Tulane Olive and Blue football
- Conference: Southern Intercollegiate Athletic Association
- Record: 5–2 (3–2 SIAA)
- Head coach: Thomas A. Barry (1st season)
- Captain: Ralph Wood
- Home stadium: Athletic Park

1904 Southern Intercollegiate Athletic Association football standings
	Conf.					Overall
Team	W		L		T	W		L		T
Vanderbilt +	5	–	0	–	0	9	–	0	–	0
Auburn +	5	–	0	–	0	5	–	0	–	0
Sewanee	4	–	1	–	0	7	–	1	–	0
Georgia Tech	3	–	1	–	1	8	–	1	–	1
Alabama	5	–	3	–	0	7	–	3	–	0
Clemson	3	–	2	–	1	3	–	3	–	1
Tulane	3	–	2	–	0	5	–	2	–	0
Kentucky State	0	–	0	–	0	9	–	1	–	0
Ole Miss	2	–	3	–	0	4	–	3	–	0
LSU	1	–	2	–	0	3	–	4	–	0
Tennessee	1	–	4	–	1	3	–	5	–	1
Cumberland (TN)	0	–	1	–	0	2	–	1	–	0
Nashville	0	–	4	–	1	2	–	5	–	1
Georgia	0	–	4	–	0	1	–	5	–	0
Mississippi A&M	0	–	4	–	0	2	–	4	–	0
+ – Conference co-champions

The 1904 Tulane Olive and Blue football team represented Tulane University during the 1904 Southern Intercollegiate Athletic Association football season.

== Schedule ==
Date	Time	Opponent	Site	Result	Attendance	Source
October 22		Louisiana Industrial*	Athletic Park; New Orleans, LA	W 11–0		
October 29		Mississippi A&M	Athletic Park; New Orleans, LA	W 10–0	1,100	
November 5		at Marion*	Marion, AL	W 10–0		
November 12		Sewanee	Athletic Park; New Orleans, LA	L 0–18		
November 19		LSU	Athletic Park; New Orleans, LA (Battle for the Rag)	W 5–0	5,000	
November 24	3:00 p.m.	Ole Miss	Athletic Park; New Orleans, LA (rivalry)	W 22–0	2,500	
December 3		Alabama	Athletic Park; New Orleans, LA	L 0–6	1,000	
*Non-conference game; All times are in Central time
