= 1904 Cumberland Bulldogs football team =

American college football season

1904 Cumberland Bulldogs football
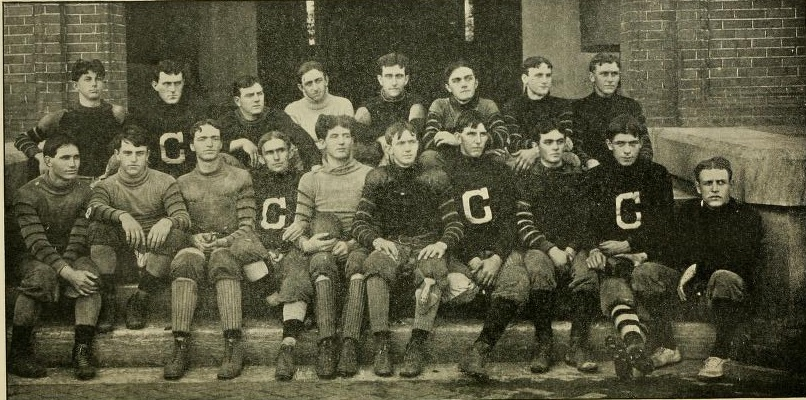
- Conference: Southern Intercollegiate Athletic Association
- Record: 2–1 (0–1 SIAA)
- Head coach: A. L. Phillips (3rd season)
- Captain: Red Smith

1904 Southern Intercollegiate Athletic Association football standings
	Conf.					Overall
Team	W		L		T	W		L		T
Vanderbilt +	5	–	0	–	0	9	–	0	–	0
Auburn +	5	–	0	–	0	5	–	0	–	0
Sewanee	4	–	1	–	0	7	–	1	–	0
Georgia Tech	3	–	1	–	1	8	–	1	–	1
Alabama	5	–	3	–	0	7	–	3	–	0
Clemson	3	–	2	–	1	3	–	3	–	1
Tulane	3	–	2	–	0	5	–	2	–	0
Kentucky State	0	–	0	–	0	9	–	1	–	0
Ole Miss	2	–	3	–	0	4	–	3	–	0
LSU	1	–	2	–	0	3	–	4	–	0
Tennessee	1	–	4	–	1	3	–	5	–	1
Cumberland (TN)	0	–	1	–	0	2	–	1	–	0
Nashville	0	–	4	–	1	2	–	5	–	1
Georgia	0	–	4	–	0	1	–	5	–	0
Mississippi A&M	0	–	4	–	0	2	–	4	–	0
+ – Conference co-champions

The 1904 Cumberland Bulldogs football team represented Cumberland University in the 1904 Southern Intercollegiate Athletic Association football season. The team was a member of the Southern Intercollegiate Athletic Association (SIAA), compiling a 2–1 record.

== Schedule ==
Date	Time	Opponent	Site	Result	Attendance	Source
November 4		Maryville (TN)*	Lebanon, TN	W 45–0		
November 15		Bethel (KY)*	Lebanon, TN	W 103–0		
November 24	2:30 p m.	at Georgia Tech	Piedmont Park; Atlanta, GA	L 0–18	5,000	
*Non-conference game
