= 1904 Nashville Garnet and Blue football team =

American college football season

1904 Nashville Garnet and Blue football
- Conference: Southern Intercollegiate Athletic Association
- Record: 2–5–1 (0–4–1 SIAA)
- Head coach: Hubert Fisher (1st season)
- Captain: Biddle
- Home stadium: Peabody Field

1904 Southern Intercollegiate Athletic Association football standings
| | Conf. | | | | | Overall |
| Team | W | | L | | T | W | | L | | T |
|---|---|---|---|---|---|---|---|---|---|---|
| Vanderbilt + | 5 | – | 0 | – | 0 | 9 | – | 0 | – | 0 |
| Auburn + | 5 | – | 0 | – | 0 | 5 | – | 0 | – | 0 |
| Sewanee | 4 | – | 1 | – | 0 | 7 | – | 1 | – | 0 |
| Georgia Tech | 3 | – | 1 | – | 1 | 8 | – | 1 | – | 1 |
| Alabama | 5 | – | 3 | – | 0 | 7 | – | 3 | – | 0 |
| Clemson | 3 | – | 2 | – | 1 | 3 | – | 3 | – | 1 |
| Tulane | 3 | – | 2 | – | 0 | 5 | – | 2 | – | 0 |
| Kentucky State | 0 | – | 0 | – | 0 | 9 | – | 1 | – | 0 |
| Ole Miss | 2 | – | 3 | – | 0 | 4 | – | 3 | – | 0 |
| LSU | 1 | – | 2 | – | 0 | 3 | – | 4 | – | 0 |
| Tennessee | 1 | – | 4 | – | 1 | 3 | – | 5 | – | 1 |
| Cumberland (TN) | 0 | – | 1 | – | 0 | 2 | – | 1 | – | 0 |
| Nashville | 0 | – | 4 | – | 1 | 2 | – | 5 | – | 1 |
| Georgia | 0 | – | 4 | – | 0 | 1 | – | 5 | – | 0 |
| Mississippi A&M | 0 | – | 4 | – | 0 | 2 | – | 4 | – | 0 |
+ – Conference co-champions

The 1904 Nashville Garnet and Blue football team was an American football team that represented the University of Nashville as a member of the Southern Intercollegiate Athletic Association (SIAA) during the 1904 college football season. In their first year under head coach Hubert Fisher, Nashville compiled an overall record of 2–5–1, with a mark of 0–4–1 in conference play, and finished 13th in the SIAA.

== Schedule ==
| Date | Opponent | Site | Result | Source |
|---|---|---|---|---|
| October 8 | Tennessee Docs* | Peabody Field; Nashville, TN | W 21–0 | |
| October 12 | at VPI* | Gibboney Field; Blacksburg, VA | L 0–32 | |
| October 15 | at Tennessee | Baldwin Park; Knoxville, TN | T 0–0 | |
| October 22 | Auburn | West End Park; Birmingham, AL | L 0–10 | |
| October 24 | at Alabama | The Quad; Tuscaloosa, AL | L 0–17 | |
| November 2 | Central University* | Peabody Field; Nashville, TN | W 34–0 | |
| November 12 | vs. Vanderbilt | Dudley Field; Nashville, TN | L 0–81 | |
| November 19 | vs. Ole Miss | Citizens Park; Memphis, TN | L 5–12 | |
*Non-conference game
