= 1904 LSU Tigers football team =

American college football season

1904 LSU Tigers football
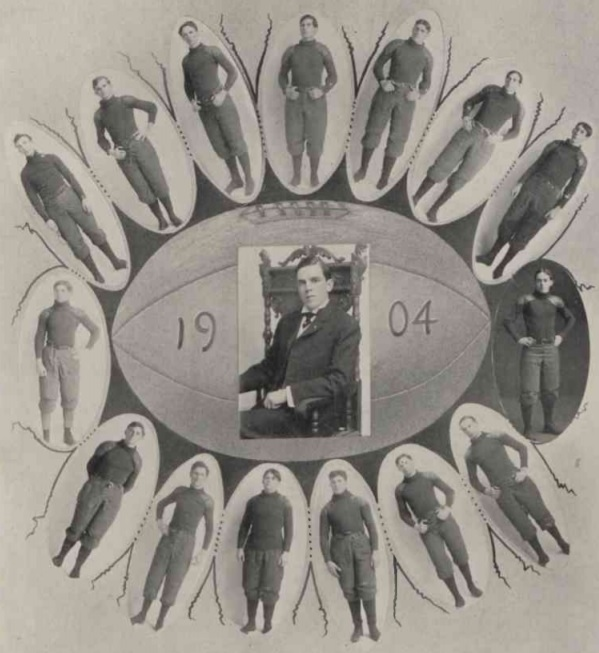
- Conference: Southern Intercollegiate Athletic Association
- Record: 3–4 (1–2 SIAA)
- Head coach: Dan A. Killian (1st season)
- Captain: E. L. Klock
- Home stadium: State Field

1904 Southern Intercollegiate Athletic Association football standings
	Conf.					Overall
Team	W		L		T	W		L		T
Vanderbilt +	5	–	0	–	0	9	–	0	–	0
Auburn +	5	–	0	–	0	5	–	0	–	0
Sewanee	4	–	1	–	0	7	–	1	–	0
Georgia Tech	3	–	1	–	1	8	–	1	–	1
Alabama	5	–	3	–	0	7	–	3	–	0
Clemson	3	–	2	–	1	3	–	3	–	1
Tulane	3	–	2	–	0	5	–	2	–	0
Kentucky State	0	–	0	–	0	9	–	1	–	0
Ole Miss	2	–	3	–	0	4	–	3	–	0
LSU	1	–	2	–	0	3	–	4	–	0
Tennessee	1	–	4	–	1	3	–	5	–	1
Cumberland (TN)	0	–	1	–	0	2	–	1	–	0
Nashville	0	–	4	–	1	2	–	5	–	1
Georgia	0	–	4	–	0	1	–	5	–	0
Mississippi A&M	0	–	4	–	0	2	–	4	–	0
+ – Conference co-champions

The 1904 LSU Tigers football team represented Louisiana State University (LSU) as a member of the Southern Intercollegiate Athletic Association (SIAA) during the 1904 college football season. Led by first-year head coach Dan A. Killian, the Tigers compiled an overall record of 3–4, with a mark of 1–2 in conference play.

== Schedule ==
Date	Opponent	Site	Result	Attendance	Source
October 21	Louisiana Industrial*	State Field; Baton Rouge, LA	W 17–0		
October 28	at Shreveport Athletic Association*	Shreveport Ball Park; Shreveport, LA	L 0–16		
October 29	at Louisiana Industrial*	Ruston, LA	L 0–6		
November 5	Ole Miss	State Field; Baton Rouge, LA (rivalry)	W 5–0		
November 10	Tennessee Docs*	State Field; Baton Rouge, LA	W 16–0		
November 19	at Tulane	Athletic Park; New Orleans, LA (Battle for the Rag)	L 0–5	5,000	
December 1	Alabama	State Field; Baton Rouge, LA (rivalry)	L 0–11		
*Non-conference game
