= 1904 Georgia Tech football team =

American college football season

1904 Georgia Tech football
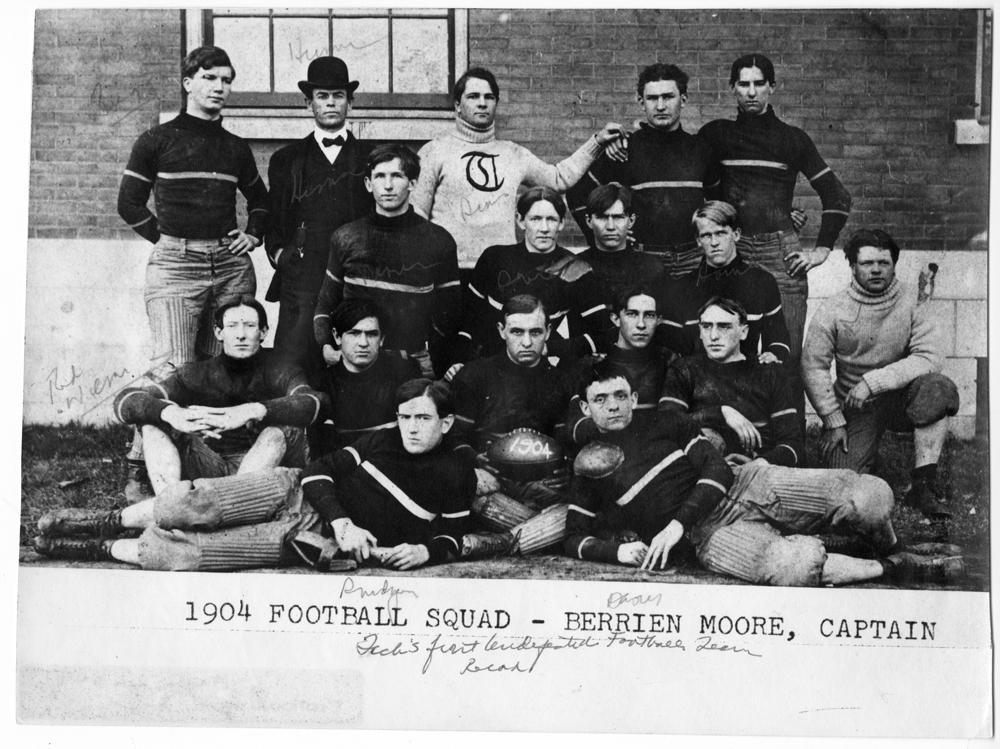
- Conference: Southern Intercollegiate Athletic Association
- Record: 8–1–1 (3–1–1 SIAA)
- Head coach: John Heisman (1st season)
- Captain: Barien Moore
- Home stadium: Piedmont Park

1904 Southern Intercollegiate Athletic Association football standings
	Conf.					Overall
Team	W		L		T	W		L		T
Vanderbilt +	5	–	0	–	0	9	–	0	–	0
Auburn +	5	–	0	–	0	5	–	0	–	0
Sewanee	4	–	1	–	0	7	–	1	–	0
Georgia Tech	3	–	1	–	1	8	–	1	–	1
Alabama	5	–	3	–	0	7	–	3	–	0
Clemson	3	–	2	–	1	3	–	3	–	1
Tulane	3	–	2	–	0	5	–	2	–	0
Kentucky State	0	–	0	–	0	9	–	1	–	0
Ole Miss	2	–	3	–	0	4	–	3	–	0
LSU	1	–	2	–	0	3	–	4	–	0
Tennessee	1	–	4	–	1	3	–	5	–	1
Cumberland (TN)	0	–	1	–	0	2	–	1	–	0
Nashville	0	–	4	–	1	2	–	5	–	1
Georgia	0	–	4	–	0	1	–	5	–	0
Mississippi A&M	0	–	4	–	0	2	–	4	–	0
+ – Conference co-champions

The 1904 Georgia Tech football team represented the Georgia Institute of Technology during the 1904 Southern Intercollegiate Athletic Association football season. This is the first year for Georgia Tech under coach John Heisman. Lob Brown was the school's first consensus All-Southern player.

== Schedule ==
Date	Time	Opponent	Site	Result	Attendance	Source
October 1		Camp McPherson*	Piedmont Park; Atlanta, GA	W 11–5		
October 8		Florida State College*	Piedmont Park; Atlanta, GA	W 35–0		
October 15		Mooney*	Piedmont Park; Atlanta, GA	W 51–0		
October 17		University of Florida (Lake City)*	Piedmont Park; Atlanta, GA	W 77–0		
October 22		Tennessee	Piedmont Park; Atlanta, GA (rivalry)	W 2–0		
October 29		at Auburn	Drill Field; Auburn, AL (rivalry)	L 0–12		
November 5		Clemson	Piedmont Park; Atlanta, GA (rivalry)	T 11–11		
November 12		Georgia	Piedmont Park; Atlanta, GA (rivalry)	W 23–6		
November 16	2:30 p.m.	Tennessee Docs*	Piedmont Park; Atlanta, GA	W 59–0		
November 24		Cumberland (TN)	Piedmont Park; Atlanta, GA	W 18–0	5,000	
*Non-conference game; All times are in Eastern time
