= 1904 Sewanee Tigers football team =

American college football season

1904 Sewanee Tigers football
- Conference: Southern Intercollegiate Athletic Association
- Record: 7–1 (4–1 SIAA)
- Head coach: George S. Whitney (2nd season)
- Captain: Rupert Colmore Sr.
- Home stadium: Hardee Field

1904 Southern Intercollegiate Athletic Association football standings
	Conf.					Overall
Team	W		L		T	W		L		T
Vanderbilt +	5	–	0	–	0	9	–	0	–	0
Auburn +	5	–	0	–	0	5	–	0	–	0
Sewanee	4	–	1	–	0	7	–	1	–	0
Georgia Tech	3	–	1	–	1	8	–	1	–	1
Alabama	5	–	3	–	0	7	–	3	–	0
Clemson	3	–	2	–	1	3	–	3	–	1
Tulane	3	–	2	–	0	5	–	2	–	0
Kentucky State	0	–	0	–	0	9	–	1	–	0
Ole Miss	2	–	3	–	0	4	–	3	–	0
LSU	1	–	2	–	0	3	–	4	–	0
Tennessee	1	–	4	–	1	3	–	5	–	1
Cumberland (TN)	0	–	1	–	0	2	–	1	–	0
Nashville	0	–	4	–	1	2	–	5	–	1
Georgia	0	–	4	–	0	1	–	5	–	0
Mississippi A&M	0	–	4	–	0	2	–	4	–	0
+ – Conference co-champions

The 1904 Sewanee Tigers football team represented the Sewanee Tigers of Sewanee: The University of the South in the 1904 Southern Intercollegiate Athletic Association football season. A game against Washington University was staged as a demonstration event at the 1904 Olympics.

== Schedule ==
Date	Time	Opponent	Site	Result	Attendance	Source
September 24		Mooney*	Hardee Field; Sewanee, TN	W 47–0		
October 11		Tennessee Docs*	Hardee Field; Sewanee, TN	W 58–0		
October 15	2:30 p.m.	at Washington University*	World's Fair Stadium; St. Louis, MO	W 17–0		
October 27		vs. Clemson	Columbia, SC	W 11–5	5,000	
October 29		at Tennessee	Baldwin Park; Knoxville, TN	W 12–0		
November 10		vs. Texas A&M	Dallas, TX	W 17–5		
November 12		at Tulane	Athletic Park; New Orleans, LA	W 18–0		
November 24		at Vanderbilt	Dudley Field; Nashville, TN (rivalry)	L 0–27	6,500	
*Non-conference game; All times are in Central time

== Players ==
=== Line ===
Player	Position	Games started	Hometown	Prep school	Height	Weight	Age
R. N. Atkinson	End, back					140	21
J. L. Brong	Guard					165	21
Rupert Colmore	End		Sewanee, Tennessee			153	21
Roland Crownover	Guard					155	20
E. H. Fowlkes	Tackle					158	18
John B. Greer	End					155	18
Ephraim Kirby-Smith	Tackle		Sewanee, Tennessee			156	20
Henry D. Phillips	Guard		Philadelphia		6'4"	188	22
G. Watkins	Guard					155	17
Miles A. Watkins	Center					184	19
David G. Wetlin	End					145	18

=== Backfield ===
Player	Position	Games started	Hometown	Prep school	Height	Weight	Age
Robert E. Bostrom	Quarterback					150	21
Wilmer S. Poyner	Halfback					142	24
Nate J. Sawrie	Fullback					168	18
John Scarbrough	Quarterback		Rockdale, Texas			135	18
John J. Shaffer	Halfback					138	18
