= 1904 Tennessee Volunteers football team =

American college football season

1904 Tennessee Volunteers football
- Conference: Southern Intercollegiate Athletic Association
- Record: 3–5–1 (1–4–1 SIAA)
- Head coach: Sax Crawford (1st season)
- Captain: Roscoe Word
- Home stadium: Baldwin Park

1904 Southern Intercollegiate Athletic Association football standings
	Conf.					Overall
Team	W		L		T	W		L		T
Vanderbilt +	5	–	0	–	0	9	–	0	–	0
Auburn +	5	–	0	–	0	5	–	0	–	0
Sewanee	4	–	1	–	0	7	–	1	–	0
Georgia Tech	3	–	1	–	1	8	–	1	–	1
Alabama	5	–	3	–	0	7	–	3	–	0
Clemson	3	–	2	–	1	3	–	3	–	1
Tulane	3	–	2	–	0	5	–	2	–	0
Kentucky State	0	–	0	–	0	9	–	1	–	0
Ole Miss	2	–	3	–	0	4	–	3	–	0
LSU	1	–	2	–	0	3	–	4	–	0
Tennessee	1	–	4	–	1	3	–	5	–	1
Cumberland (TN)	0	–	1	–	0	2	–	1	–	0
Nashville	0	–	4	–	1	2	–	5	–	1
Georgia	0	–	4	–	0	1	–	5	–	0
Mississippi A&M	0	–	4	–	0	2	–	4	–	0
+ – Conference co-champions

The 1904 Tennessee Volunteers football team represented the University of Tennessee in the 1904 Southern Intercollegiate Athletic Association football season. The team was led by its fourth new coach in six years, Sax Crawford, who coached the team for a single season. On November 24, Tennessee beat Alabama for the first time in school history. Fullback Sam McAllester wore a belt with handles, and was thrown by teammates for a touchdown.

== Schedule ==
Date	Opponent	Site	Result	Source
October 8	Maryville (TN)*	Baldwin Park; Knoxville, TN	W 17–0	
October 15	Nashville	Baldwin Park; Knoxville, TN	T 0–0	
October 22	at Georgia Tech	Piedmont Park; Atlanta, GA (rivalry)	L 0–2	
October 29	Sewanee	Baldwin Park; Knoxville, TN	L 0–12	
November 5	at Vanderbilt	Dudley Field; Nashville, TN (rivalry)	L 0–22	
November 12	Clemson	Baldwin Park; Knoxville, TN	L 0–6	
November 16	at Cincinnati*	League Park; Cincinnati, OH	L 0–35	
November 19	at Grant*	Olympic Park Field; Chattanooga, TN	W 23–0	
November 24	at Alabama	West End Park; Birmingham, AL (rivalry)	W 5–0	
*Non-conference game
