= Jesse Sibley =

American athlete and coach (1879–1968)

Biographical details
- Born: October 30, 1879; Shelbyville, Kentucky, U.S.
- Died: April, 1968; Florida, U.S.
- Education: Vanderbilt University

Playing career
- 1904: Vanderbilt
- Position: Guard (football)

Coaching career (HC unless noted)
- 1920–1922: Kentucky Wesleyan

Jesse Bourbon Sibley (October 30, 1879 – April, 1968) was a college football and basketball player and coach. He was also a prominent educator in Louisville, Kentucky. Sibley played for the Vanderbilt Commodores, and coached for the Kentucky Wesleyan Panthers.
