= A. L. Phillips =

American football coach

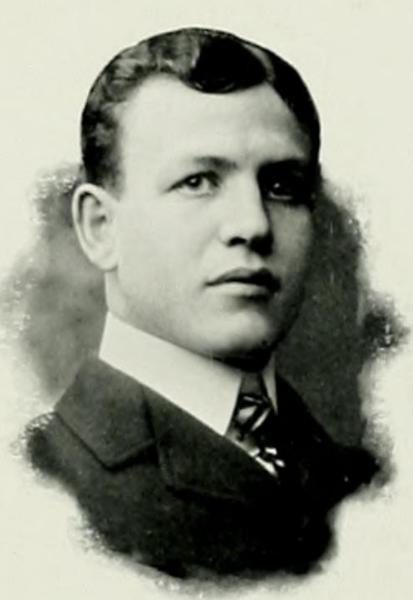
- Phillips pictured in The Phoenix 1903, Cumberland University yearbook

Playing career
- 1899–1900: Washington & Jefferson
- Position: Halfback

Coaching career (HC unless noted)
- 1902–1904: Cumberland (TN)

Head coaching record
- Overall: 12–7–1

Accomplishments and honors

Championships
- 1 SIAA (1903)

A. L. Phillips was an American college football player and coach. He played football as a halfback at Washington & Jefferson College in Washington, Pennsylvania and was captain of the 1900 Washington & Jefferson football team before graduating in 1901. Phillips served as the head football coach at Cumberland University in Lebanon, Tennessee from 1902 to 1904. He led the 1903 Cumberland Bulldogs to share of the Southern Intercollegiate Athletic Association (SIAA) title.

Phillips was later treasurer of the Union Trust Company of Washington, Pennsylvania.

== Head coaching record ==
Year	Team	Overall	Conference	Standing	Bowl/playoffs
Cumberland Bulldogs (Southern Intercollegiate Athletic Association) (1902–1904)
1902	Cumberland	3–5	1–4	12th	
1903	Cumberland	6–1–1	4–1–1	T–1st	
1904	Cumberland	3–1	1–1	8th	
Cumberland:		12–7–1	6–6–1		
Total:		12–7–1			
National championship Conference title Conference division title or championship game berth
