= Shack Shealy =

American football player and coach (1873–1929)

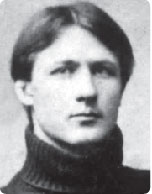

Biographical details
- Born: June 1, 1873; Saluda County, South Carolina, U.S.
- Died: October 24, 1929 (aged 56); Augusta, Georgia, U.S.

Playing career
- 1896–1898: Clemson
- Position: End

Coaching career (HC unless noted)
- 1904: Clemson

Head coaching record
- Overall: 3–3–1

Alonzo Sheck "Shack" Shealy (June 1, 1873 – October 24, 1929) was an American college football player and coach. He served as the head football coach at Clemson University in 1904 and is the only Clemson graduate to be head football coach of his alma mater. A member of Clemson's first football team in 1896, Shealy served as team captain in 1898.

== Biography ==
Shealy was born on June 1, 1873, in Etheridge, South Carolina, an area now known as Saluda County (formerly part of Edgefield County). His father, J. Edward Shealy, was a well-to-do planter of Edgefield, his mother was Miss Frances Linder, of Lexington. Shealy attended public schools of this County until February 1894, when he enrolled at Clemson Agricultural College of South Carolina, in June 1894; graduated 1899 with a Bachelor of Science degree.

"He decided to take the agricultural course and has pursued it to a successful completion. He has been honored with the highest office in the corps, being appointed Senior Captain in February 1898. He has been president of the Columbian Society, was captain of the '98 foot ball [sic] team, holding the position of left end in a manner that left nothing to be desired.

"After graduation Mr. Shealy expects to make a specialty of Veterinary Science.

"Characteristic: A fondness for, but extreme diffidence toward the fair sex."

Entered Iowa State College at Ames, March 1900- taking degree Doctor of Veterinary Medicine, June 1903; at Clemson Agricultural College of South Carolina as Assistant Veterinarian in 1904. Played four years as a Tiger, and two more years for Iowa State. He was hired in the fall of 1904 to replace Coach John Heisman who had accepted Georgia Tech's offer to become head of athletics at the institute in November 1903. He holds the distinction of being the only Clemson player to have been head coach at his alma mater. Shealy coached Clemson one year and guided the Tigers to a 3–3–1 record overall, which included wins over Alabama, Georgia, and Tennessee, giving him a .500 winning percentage.

He died on October 24, 1929.

== Head coaching record ==
Year	Team	Overall	Conference	Standing	Bowl/playoffs
Clemson Tigers (Southern Intercollegiate Athletic Association) (1904)
1904	Clemson	3–3–1	3–3–1	9th	
Clemson:		3–3–1	3–3–1		
Total:		3–3–1			
