= Sax Crawford =

American football player and coach (1881–1964)

Biographical details
- Born: October 6, 1881; Knoxville, Tennessee, U.S.
- Died: February 11, 1964 (aged 82); Birmingham, Alabama, U.S.

Playing career
- 1901–1902: Tennessee
- Position: Quarterback

Coaching career (HC unless noted)
- 1904: Tennessee

Head coaching record
- Overall: 3–5–1

Saxton Daryl Crawford Sr. (October 6, 1881 – February 11, 1964) was an American football player and coach. He served as the head coach at the University of Tennessee for one season in 1904, compiling a record 3–5–1. Crawford was the first Tennessee head coach to record a win against the rival Alabama Crimson Tide. Crawford died on February 11, 1964, at a hospital in Birmingham, Alabama.

== Head coaching record ==
Year	Team	Overall	Conference	Standing	Bowl/playoffs
Tennessee Volunteers (Southern Intercollegiate Athletic Association) (1904)
1904	Tennessee	3–5–1	1–4	11th	
Tennessee:		3–5–1	1–4		
Total:		3–5–1			
