= Charles A. Barnard (American football) =

American football player and coach (1880–1977)

Biographical details
- Born: March 22, 1880; Washington, D.C., U.S.
- Died: December 6, 1977 (aged 97); Washington, D.C., U.S.

Playing career
- 1901: Harvard
- Position: Guard

Coaching career (HC unless noted)
- 1904: Georgia
- 1905: George Washington

Head coaching record
- Overall: 4–9–2

Accomplishments and honors

Awards
- Consensus All-American (1901)

Charles Arthur Barnard (March 22, 1880 – December 6, 1977) was an American college football player and coach. He served as the head coach for one season each at the University of Georgia (1904) and the George Washington University (1905). Barnard attended Harvard University, where he played football as a guard. In 1901, he was named a consensus All-American. Barnard graduated from Harvard in 1902. In 1904, he became the tenth head coach of the Georgia football team and recorded a 1–5 record. The following year, Barnard took over the head coaching job at George Washington, which he held for one year. There, he recorded a 3–4–2 record.

== Head coaching record ==
Year	Team	Overall	Conference	Standing	Bowl/playoffs
Georgia Bulldogs (Southern Intercollegiate Athletic Association) (1904)
1904	Georgia	1–5	0–4		
Georgia:		1–5	0–4		
George Washington Hatchetites (Independent) (1905)
1905	George Washington	3–4–2			
George Washington:		3–4–2			
Total:		4–9–2			
