= George S. Whitney =

American football player and coach (1878–1956)

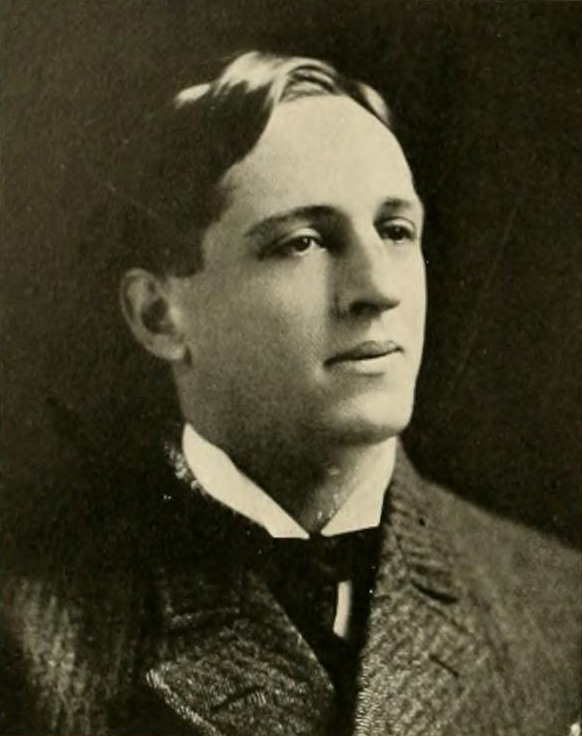
- Whitney pictured in The Agromeck 1906, North Carolina State yearbook

Biographical details
- Born: March 2, 1878; Binghamton, New York, U.S.
- Died: May 5, 1956 (aged 78); Schenectady, New York, U.S.

Playing career
- 1900: Cornell
- Position: Tackle

Coaching career (HC unless noted)
- 1902: Union (NY)
- 1903–1904: Sewanee
- 1905: North Carolina A&M
- 1906–1907: Georgia

Head coaching record
- Overall: 24–19–3

Accomplishments and honors

Championships
- 1 SIAA (1903)

George Stoddard Whitney (March 2, 1878 – May 5, 1956) was an American college football player and coach. He served as the head football coach at Union College in 1902, at Sewanee: The University of the South from 1903 to 1904, and at North Carolina College of Agriculture and Mechanic Arts—North Carolina State University—in 1905, and at the University of Georgia from 1906 to 1907, compiling a career head coaching record of 24–19–3. Whitney played football as a tackle at Cornell University. He died at his home in Schenectady, New York on May 5, 1956.

== Head coaching record ==
Year	Team	Overall	Conference	Standing	Bowl/playoffs
Union Garnet (Independent) (1902)
1902	Union	0–9			
Union:		0–9			
Sewanee Tigers (Southern Intercollegiate Athletic Association) (1903–1904)
1903	Sewanee	7–1	5–1	T–1st	
1904	Sewanee	7–1	4–1	5th	
Sewanee:		14–2	9–2		
North Carolina A&M Aggies (Independent) (1905)
1905	North Carolina A&M	4–1–1			
North Carolina A&M:		4–1–1			
Georgia Bulldogs (Southern Intercollegiate Athletic Association) (1906–1907)
1906	Georgia	2–4–1	2–3–1	10th	
1907	Georgia	4–3–1	2–3–1	8th	
Georgia:		6–7–2	4–6–2		
Total:		33–19–3			
National championship Conference title Conference division title or championship game berth
