= W. A. Blount =

American football coach (1879–1918)

Biographical details
- Born: May 23, 1879; Pensacola, Florida, U.S.
- Died: October 28, 1918 (aged 39); Pensacola, Florida, U.S.
- Education: Yale (B.A. 1903); University of Alabama

Coaching career (HC unless noted)
- 1903–1904: Alabama

Head coaching record
- Overall: 10–7

William Alexander Blount Jr. (May 23, 1879 – October 28, 1918) was an American football coach. He served as the head football coach at the University of Alabama from 1903 to 1904, compiling a career record of 10–7.

== Head coaching record ==
| Year | Team | Overall | Conference | Standing | Bowl/playoffs |
|---|---|---|---|---|---|
Alabama Crimson White (Southern Intercollegiate Athletic Association) (1903–1904)
| 1903 | Alabama | 3–4 | 3–4 | | |
| 1904 | Alabama | 7–3 | 4–3 | | |
| Alabama: | | 10–7 | 7–7 | | |
| Total: | | 10–7 | | | |
