= Hubert Fisher =

American politician (1877–1941)

Hubert F. Fisher
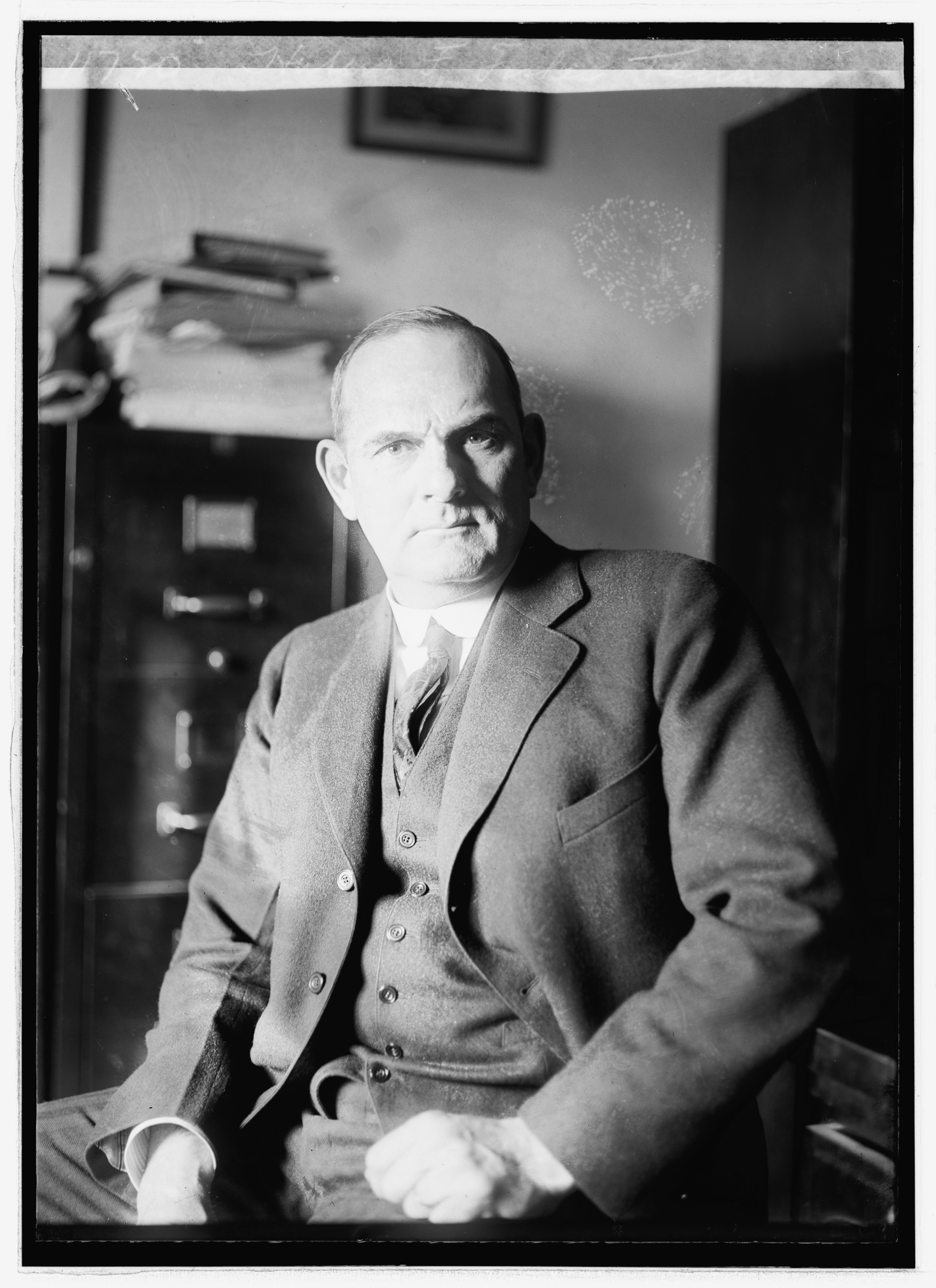

Member of the U.S. House of Representatives from Tennessee's 10th district
- In office March 4, 1917 – March 3, 1931
- Preceded by: Kenneth McKellar
- Succeeded by: E. H. Crump

Personal details
- Born: October 6, 1877 Milton, Florida, U.S.
- Died: June 16, 1941 (aged 63) New York City, New York, U.S.
- Resting place: Old Gray Cemetery, Knoxville, Tennessee
- Party: Democratic
- Spouse: Louise Sanford Fisher
- Education: University of Mississippi, Princeton University

Hubert Fisher
Playing career
- c. 1901: Princeton

Coaching career (HC unless noted)
- 1902–1903: Tennessee
- 1904: Nashville

Head coaching record
- Overall: 12–13–1

Accomplishments and honors

Awards
- Third-team All-American (1901)

Hubert Frederick Fisher (October 6, 1877 – June 16, 1941) was an American politician and a member of the United States House of Representatives for the 10th congressional district of Tennessee.

== Biography ==
Fisher was born on October 6, 1877, in Milton, Florida, in Santa Rosa County son of Frederick and Mary Anna (McCarter) Fisher. He attended the common schools and graduated from the University of Mississippi at Oxford in 1898. Fisher also attended Princeton University, and was a star player on the 1901 football team. He served as the third head football coach at the University of Tennessee from 1902 to 1903, following J. A. Pierce, the initial occupant of the newly created position, and Pierce's successor, Gilbert Kelly, compiling a career record of 10–7. Like Kelley, he also played at Princeton University before coaching the Tennessee Volunteers.

== Career ==
Fisher studied law, was admitted to the bar in 1904, and commenced practice in Memphis, Tennessee. He married Louise Sanford on November 6, 1909. He was a delegate to the Democratic National Convention in 1912. He was a member of the Tennessee Senate in 1913 and 1914. From 1914 to 1917, he was the United States district attorney for the western district of Tennessee.

Elected as a Democrat to the Sixty-fifth and to the six succeeding Congresses, Fisher served from March 4, 1917, to March 3, 1931, but he was not a candidate for renomination in 1930. Due to deafness, he retired from legal and political activities and moved to Germantown, Tennessee, where he engaged in nursery pursuits.

== Death ==
Fisher died on June 16, 1941 (age 63 years, 253 days) while on a visit to New York City. He is interred at Old Gray Cemetery in Knoxville, Tennessee.

== Head coaching record ==
Year	Team	Overall	Conference	Standing	Bowl/playoffs
Tennessee Volunteers (Southern Intercollegiate Athletic Association) (1902–1903)
1902	Tennessee	6–2	4–2	5th	
1903	Tennessee	4–5	1–4	11th	
Tennessee:		10–7	4–6		
Nashville Garnet and Blue (Southern Intercollegiate Athletic Association) (1904)
1904	Nashville	2–6–1	1–5–1	13th	
Nashville:		2–6–1	1–5–1		
Total:		12–13–1			

U.S. House of Representatives
Preceded by Kenneth McKellar	Member of the U.S. House of Representatives from Tennessee's 10th congressional district 1917–1931	Succeeded by E. H. Crump
