= 1908 Baylor football team =

American college football season

1908 Baylor football
- Conference: Independent
- Record: 3–5
- Head coach: Enoch J. Mills (1st season)
- Captain: Charles A. Gantt
- Home stadium: Carroll Field

1908 Southern college football independents records
	Conf.			Overall
Team	W	L	T	W		L		T
Southwestern Louisiana Industrial		–		6	–	0	–	0
Virginia		–		7	–	0	–	1
Rollins		–		4	–	0	–	1
George Washington		–		8	–	1	–	1
Oklahoma		–		8	–	1	–	1
Tulane		–		7	–	1	–	0
North Carolina A&M		–		6	–	1	–	0
The Citadel		–		4	–	1	–	1
Navy		–		9	–	2	–	1
Florida		–		5	–	2	–	1
TCU		–		6	–	3	–	0
VMI		–		4	–	2	–	0
Davidson		–		5	–	3	–	1
Baylor		–		5	–	3	–	0
West Virginia		–		5	–	3	–	0
Kentucky State		–		4	–	3	–	0
Louisiana Industrial		–		4	–	3	–	1
Arkansas		–		5	–	4	–	0
Texas		–		5	–	4	–	0
VPI		–		5	–	4	–	0
Arkansas State Normal		–		3	–	3	–	0
Chattanooga		–		4	–	4	–	0
North Carolina		–		3	–	3	–	3
Oklahoma A&M		–		4	–	4	–	0
Delaware		–		3	–	4	–	1
Kendall		–		2	–	3	–	0
South Carolina		–		3	–	5	–	1
Texas A&M		–		3	–	5	–	0
Georgetown		–		2	–	4	–	1
Howard (AL)		–		2	–	4	–	0
Maryland		–		3	–	8	–	0
Birmingham		–		0	–	3	–	3
Stetson		–		0	–	1	–	1
Wake Forest		–		1	–	4	–	0
Goldey College		–		0	–	2	–	1
Mississippi College		–		0	–	1	–	0
Southwest Texas State		–		0	–	2	–	0
Marshall		–		0	–	6	–	0

The 1908 Baylor Bears football team represented Baylor University as an independent during the 1908 college football season. In their first season under head coach Enoch J. Mills, the Bears compiled a 3–5 record and were outscored by opponents by a combined total of 164 to 48. They played their home games at Carroll Field in Waco, Texas. Charles A. Gantt was the team captain.

== Schedule ==
Date	Opponent	Site	Result	Source
October 3	TCU	Carroll Field; Waco, TX (rivalry)	L 0–15	
October 10	at Texas A&M	Kyle Field; College Station, TX (rivalry)	W 6–5	
October 17	at Texas	Clark Field; Austin, TX (rivalry)	L 5–27	
October 24	TCU	Carroll Field; Waco, TX	L 6–10	
November 7	at Tulane	Pelican Park; New Orleans, LA	L 2–10	
November 10	at LSU	State Field; Baton Rouge, LA	L 0–89	
November 21	Tulane	Carroll Field; Waco, TX	W 6–0	
November 26	TCU	Carroll Field; Waco, TX	W 23–8	
