= 1908 Tulane Olive and Blue football team =

American college football season

1908 Tulane Olive and Blue football
- Conference: Independent
- Record: 7–1
- Head coach: Joe Curtis (2nd season)
- Captain: Temple Brown
- Home stadium: Pelican Park

1908 Southern college football independents records
	Conf.			Overall
Team	W	L	T	W		L		T
Southwestern Louisiana Industrial		–		6	–	0	–	0
Virginia		–		7	–	0	–	1
Rollins		–		4	–	0	–	1
George Washington		–		8	–	1	–	1
Oklahoma		–		8	–	1	–	1
Tulane		–		7	–	1	–	0
North Carolina A&M		–		6	–	1	–	0
The Citadel		–		4	–	1	–	1
Navy		–		9	–	2	–	1
Florida		–		5	–	2	–	1
TCU		–		6	–	3	–	0
VMI		–		4	–	2	–	0
Davidson		–		5	–	3	–	1
Baylor		–		5	–	3	–	0
West Virginia		–		5	–	3	–	0
Kentucky State		–		4	–	3	–	0
Louisiana Industrial		–		4	–	3	–	1
Arkansas		–		5	–	4	–	0
Texas		–		5	–	4	–	0
VPI		–		5	–	4	–	0
Arkansas State Normal		–		3	–	3	–	0
Chattanooga		–		4	–	4	–	0
North Carolina		–		3	–	3	–	3
Oklahoma A&M		–		4	–	4	–	0
Delaware		–		3	–	4	–	1
Kendall		–		2	–	3	–	0
South Carolina		–		3	–	5	–	1
Texas A&M		–		3	–	5	–	0
Georgetown		–		2	–	4	–	1
Howard (AL)		–		2	–	4	–	0
Maryland		–		3	–	8	–	0
Birmingham		–		0	–	3	–	3
Stetson		–		0	–	1	–	1
Wake Forest		–		1	–	4	–	0
Goldey College		–		0	–	2	–	1
Mississippi College		–		0	–	1	–	0
Southwest Texas State		–		0	–	2	–	0
Marshall		–		0	–	6	–	0

The 1908 Tulane Olive and Blue football team was an American football team that represented Tulane University as an independent during the 1908 college football season. In their second year under head coach Joe Curtis, the team compiled an overall record of 7–1, shut out five of eight opponent, and outscored all opponents by a total of 103 to 23.

== Schedule ==
Date	Time	Opponent	Site	Result	Source
October 10		New Orleans YMGC	Pelican Park; New Orleans, LA	W 11–0	
October 24		Central University (KY)	Pelican Park; New Orleans, LA	W 10–0	
October 31		Ole Miss	Pelican Park; New Orleans, LA (rivalry)	W 10–0	
November 7		Baylor	Pelican Park; New Orleans, LA	W 10–2	
November 14		Mississippi A&M	Pelican Park; New Orleans, LA	W 33–0	
November 18		at Texas	Clark Field; Austin, TX	W 28–15	
November 21		at Baylor	Carroll Field; Waco, TX	L 0–6	
November 26	2:30 p.m.	Washington University	Pelican Park; New Orleans, LA	W 11–0	
All times are in Central time
