= 1908 TCU football team =

American college football season

1908 TCU football
- Conference: Independent
- Record: 6–3
- Head coach: Jesse R. Langley (1st season)

1908 Southern college football independents records
	Conf.			Overall
Team	W	L	T	W		L		T
Southwestern Louisiana Industrial		–		6	–	0	–	0
Virginia		–		7	–	0	–	1
Rollins		–		4	–	0	–	1
George Washington		–		8	–	1	–	1
Oklahoma		–		8	–	1	–	1
Tulane		–		7	–	1	–	0
North Carolina A&M		–		6	–	1	–	0
The Citadel		–		4	–	1	–	1
Navy		–		9	–	2	–	1
Florida		–		5	–	2	–	1
TCU		–		6	–	3	–	0
VMI		–		4	–	2	–	0
Davidson		–		5	–	3	–	1
Baylor		–		5	–	3	–	0
West Virginia		–		5	–	3	–	0
Kentucky State		–		4	–	3	–	0
Louisiana Industrial		–		4	–	3	–	1
Arkansas		–		5	–	4	–	0
Texas		–		5	–	4	–	0
VPI		–		5	–	4	–	0
Arkansas State Normal		–		3	–	3	–	0
Chattanooga		–		4	–	4	–	0
North Carolina		–		3	–	3	–	3
Oklahoma A&M		–		4	–	4	–	0
Delaware		–		3	–	4	–	1
Kendall		–		2	–	3	–	0
South Carolina		–		3	–	5	–	1
Texas A&M		–		3	–	5	–	0
Georgetown		–		2	–	4	–	1
Howard (AL)		–		2	–	4	–	0
Maryland		–		3	–	8	–	0
Birmingham		–		0	–	3	–	3
Stetson		–		0	–	1	–	1
Wake Forest		–		1	–	4	–	0
Goldey College		–		0	–	2	–	1
Mississippi College		–		0	–	1	–	0
Southwest Texas State		–		0	–	2	–	0
Marshall		–		0	–	6	–	0

The 1908 TCU football team represented Texas Christian University (TCU) as an independent during the 1908 college football season. Led by Jesse R. Langley in his first year as head coach, TCU compiled a record of 6–3. They played their home games in Waco, Texas.

== Schedule ==
Date	Time	Opponent	Site	Result	Source
September 26		Texas Deaf School	Waco, TX	W 59–0	
October 3		at Baylor	Carroll Field; Waco, TX (rivalry)	W 15–0	
October 10		at Texas	Clark Field; Austin, TX (rivalry)	L 6–11	
October 19	3:45 p.m.	at Trinity (TX)	Waxahachie, TX	W 11–10	
October 24		at Baylor	Carroll Field; Waco, TX	W 10–6	
October 31		Texas A&M	Waco, TX (rivalry)	L 10–13	
November 7		Trinity (TX)	Waco, TX	W 22–0	
November 14		at Southwestern (TX)	Georgetown, TX	W 14–5	
November 26		at Baylor	Carroll Field; Waco, TX	L 8–23	
