= 1908 Texas A&M Aggies football team =

American college football season

1908 Texas A&M Aggies football
- Conference: Independent
- Record: 3–5
- Head coach: Ned Merriam (1st season)
- Home stadium: Kyle Field

1908 Southern college football independents records
	Conf.			Overall
Team	W	L	T	W		L		T
Southwestern Louisiana Industrial		–		6	–	0	–	0
Virginia		–		7	–	0	–	1
Rollins		–		4	–	0	–	1
George Washington		–		8	–	1	–	1
Oklahoma		–		8	–	1	–	1
Tulane		–		7	–	1	–	0
North Carolina A&M		–		6	–	1	–	0
The Citadel		–		4	–	1	–	1
Navy		–		9	–	2	–	1
Florida		–		5	–	2	–	1
TCU		–		6	–	3	–	0
VMI		–		4	–	2	–	0
Davidson		–		5	–	3	–	1
Baylor		–		5	–	3	–	0
West Virginia		–		5	–	3	–	0
Kentucky State		–		4	–	3	–	0
Louisiana Industrial		–		4	–	3	–	1
Arkansas		–		5	–	4	–	0
Texas		–		5	–	4	–	0
VPI		–		5	–	4	–	0
Arkansas State Normal		–		3	–	3	–	0
Chattanooga		–		4	–	4	–	0
North Carolina		–		3	–	3	–	3
Oklahoma A&M		–		4	–	4	–	0
Delaware		–		3	–	4	–	1
Kendall		–		2	–	3	–	0
South Carolina		–		3	–	5	–	1
Texas A&M		–		3	–	5	–	0
Georgetown		–		2	–	4	–	1
Howard (AL)		–		2	–	4	–	0
Maryland		–		3	–	8	–	0
Birmingham		–		0	–	3	–	3
Stetson		–		0	–	1	–	1
Wake Forest		–		1	–	4	–	0
Goldey College		–		0	–	2	–	1
Mississippi College		–		0	–	1	–	0
Southwest Texas State		–		0	–	2	–	0
Marshall		–		0	–	6	–	0

The 1908 Texas A&M Aggies football team represented the Agricultural and Mechanical College of Texas. It is now known as Texas A&M University. During the 1908 college football season, they competed as an independent team. Led by Ned Merriam in his first and only season as head coach, the Aggies compiled a record of 3–5.

== Schedule ==
Date	Opponent	Site	Result	Attendance	Source
October 3	Trinity (TX)	Kyle Field; College Station, TX	W 6–0		
October 10	Baylor	Kyle Field; College Station, TX (rivalry)	L 5–6		
October 17	vs. LSU	Pelican Park; New Orleans, LA (rivalry)	L 0–26	1,800	
October 31	at TCU	Waco, TX (rivalry)	W 13–10		
November 9	vs. Texas	West End Park; Houston, TX (rivalry)	L 8–24		
November 13	Haskell	Kyle Field; College Station, TX	L 0–23		
November 19	Southwestern (TX)	Kyle Field; College Station, TX	W 32–0		
November 26	at Texas	Clark Field; Austin, TX	L 12–28		
