= 1909 Baylor football team =

American college football season

1909 Baylor football
- Conference: Independent
- Record: 5–3
- Head coach: Enoch J. Mills (2nd season)
- Captain: Thomas P. Robinson
- Home stadium: Carroll Field

1908 Southern college football independents records
	Conf.			Overall
Team	W	L	T	W		L		T
Southwestern Louisiana Industrial		–		6	–	0	–	0
Virginia		–		7	–	0	–	1
Rollins		–		4	–	0	–	1
George Washington		–		8	–	1	–	1
Oklahoma		–		8	–	1	–	1
Tulane		–		7	–	1	–	0
North Carolina A&M		–		6	–	1	–	0
The Citadel		–		4	–	1	–	1
Navy		–		9	–	2	–	1
Florida		–		5	–	2	–	1
TCU		–		6	–	3	–	0
VMI		–		4	–	2	–	0
Davidson		–		5	–	3	–	1
Baylor		–		5	–	3	–	0
West Virginia		–		5	–	3	–	0
Kentucky State		–		4	–	3	–	0
Louisiana Industrial		–		4	–	3	–	1
Arkansas		–		5	–	4	–	0
Texas		–		5	–	4	–	0
VPI		–		5	–	4	–	0
Arkansas State Normal		–		3	–	3	–	0
Chattanooga		–		4	–	4	–	0
North Carolina		–		3	–	3	–	3
Oklahoma A&M		–		4	–	4	–	0
Delaware		–		3	–	4	–	1
Kendall		–		2	–	3	–	0
South Carolina		–		3	–	5	–	1
Texas A&M		–		3	–	5	–	0
Georgetown		–		2	–	4	–	1
Howard (AL)		–		2	–	4	–	0
Maryland		–		3	–	8	–	0
Birmingham		–		0	–	3	–	3
Stetson		–		0	–	1	–	1
Wake Forest		–		1	–	4	–	0
Goldey College		–		0	–	2	–	1
Mississippi College		–		0	–	1	–	0
Southwest Texas State		–		0	–	2	–	0
Marshall		–		0	–	6	–	0

The 1909 Baylor football team was an American football team that represented Baylor University as an independent during the 1909 college football season. In its second season under head coach Enoch J. Mills, the team compiled a 5–3 record and outscored opponent by a total of 112 to 41.

1909 was only the second season in which Baylor's first six games were at home; since then, Baylor has not begun the season with more than four home games. The season is prominent for having the world's first "Home-Coming" at the Thanksgiving Day game, which included a concert, parade, and bonfire. To this day, Baylor claims to have the largest homecoming parade in the world.

== Schedule ==
Date	Opponent	Site	Result	Attendance	Source
October 4	San Marcos Academy	Carroll Field; Waco, TX	W 55–0		
October 9	Trinity (TX)	Carroll Field; Waco, TX	W 17–6		
October 16	TCU	Carroll Field; Waco, TX (rivalry)	L 0–9		
October 20	Haskell	Carroll Field; Waco, TX	W 12–0	500	
October 30	Texas A&M	Carroll Field; Waco, TX (rivalry)	L 6–9		
November 6	TCU	Carroll Field; Waco, TX	L 0–11		
November 17	at Simmons (TX)	Abilene, TX	W 16–3		
November 25	TCU^{†}	Carroll Field; Waco, TX	W 6–3		
^{†}Homecoming
