= 1908 Texas Longhorns football team =

American college football season

1908 Texas Longhorns football
- Conference: Independent
- Record: 5–4
- Head coach: W. E. Metzenthin (2nd season)
- Captain: L. H. Feldhake
- Home stadium: Clark Field

1908 Southern college football independents records
	Conf.			Overall
Team	W	L	T	W		L		T
Southwestern Louisiana Industrial		–		6	–	0	–	0
Virginia		–		7	–	0	–	1
Rollins		–		4	–	0	–	1
George Washington		–		8	–	1	–	1
Oklahoma		–		8	–	1	–	1
Tulane		–		7	–	1	–	0
North Carolina A&M		–		6	–	1	–	0
The Citadel		–		4	–	1	–	1
Navy		–		9	–	2	–	1
Florida		–		5	–	2	–	1
TCU		–		6	–	3	–	0
VMI		–		4	–	2	–	0
Davidson		–		5	–	3	–	1
Baylor		–		5	–	3	–	0
West Virginia		–		5	–	3	–	0
Kentucky State		–		4	–	3	–	0
Louisiana Industrial		–		4	–	3	–	1
Arkansas		–		5	–	4	–	0
Texas		–		5	–	4	–	0
VPI		–		5	–	4	–	0
Arkansas State Normal		–		3	–	3	–	0
Chattanooga		–		4	–	4	–	0
North Carolina		–		3	–	3	–	3
Oklahoma A&M		–		4	–	4	–	0
Delaware		–		3	–	4	–	1
Kendall		–		2	–	3	–	0
South Carolina		–		3	–	5	–	1
Texas A&M		–		3	–	5	–	0
Georgetown		–		2	–	4	–	1
Howard (AL)		–		2	–	4	–	0
Maryland		–		3	–	8	–	0
Birmingham		–		0	–	3	–	3
Stetson		–		0	–	1	–	1
Wake Forest		–		1	–	4	–	0
Goldey College		–		0	–	2	–	1
Mississippi College		–		0	–	1	–	0
Southwest Texas State		–		0	–	2	–	0
Marshall		–		0	–	6	–	0

The 1908 Texas Longhorns football team was an American football team that represented the University of Texas (now known as the University of Texas at Austin) as an independent during the 1908 college football season. In their second year under head coach W. E. Metzenthin, the Longhorns compiled an overall record of 5–4.

== Schedule ==
Date	Opponent	Site	Result	Source
October 10	TCU	Clark Field; Austin, TX (rivalry)	W 11–6	
October 17	Baylor	Clark Field; Austin, TX (rivalry)	W 12–5	
October 24	Colorado College	Clark Field; Austin, TX	L 0–16	
November 2	Arkansas	Clark Field; Austin, TX (rivalry)	W 21–0	
November 5	Southwestern (TX)	Clark Field; Austin, TX	L 9–11	
November 9	vs. Texas A&M	West End Park; Houston, TX (rivalry)	W 24–8	
November 13	at Oklahoma	Boyd Field; Norman, OK (rivalry)	L 0–50	
November 18	Tulane	Clark Field; Austin, TX	L 15–28	
November 26	Texas A&M	Clark Field; Austin, TX	W 28–12	
