= 1908 Kentucky State College Blue and White football team =

American college football season

1908 Kentucky State College Blue and White football
- Conference: Kentucky Intercollegiate Athletic Association
- Record: 4–3 (2–0 KIAA)
- Head coach: J. White Guyn (3rd season)
- Captain: George Hendrickson

1908 Southern college football independents records
	Conf.			Overall
Team	W	L	T	W		L		T
Southwestern Louisiana Industrial		–		6	–	0	–	0
Virginia		–		7	–	0	–	1
Rollins		–		4	–	0	–	1
George Washington		–		8	–	1	–	1
Oklahoma		–		8	–	1	–	1
Tulane		–		7	–	1	–	0
North Carolina A&M		–		6	–	1	–	0
The Citadel		–		4	–	1	–	1
Navy		–		9	–	2	–	1
Florida		–		5	–	2	–	1
TCU		–		6	–	3	–	0
VMI		–		4	–	2	–	0
Davidson		–		5	–	3	–	1
Baylor		–		5	–	3	–	0
West Virginia		–		5	–	3	–	0
Kentucky State		–		4	–	3	–	0
Louisiana Industrial		–		4	–	3	–	1
Arkansas		–		5	–	4	–	0
Texas		–		5	–	4	–	0
VPI		–		5	–	4	–	0
Arkansas State Normal		–		3	–	3	–	0
Chattanooga		–		4	–	4	–	0
North Carolina		–		3	–	3	–	3
Oklahoma A&M		–		4	–	4	–	0
Delaware		–		3	–	4	–	1
Kendall		–		2	–	3	–	0
South Carolina		–		3	–	5	–	1
Texas A&M		–		3	–	5	–	0
Georgetown		–		2	–	4	–	1
Howard (AL)		–		2	–	4	–	0
Maryland		–		3	–	8	–	0
Birmingham		–		0	–	3	–	3
Stetson		–		0	–	1	–	1
Wake Forest		–		1	–	4	–	0
Goldey College		–		0	–	2	–	1
Mississippi College		–		0	–	1	–	0
Southwest Texas State		–		0	–	2	–	0
Marshall		–		0	–	6	–	0

The 1908 Kentucky State College Blue and White football team was an American football team that represented Kentucky State College (now known as the University of Kentucky) as an independent during the 1908 college football season. In its third season under head coach J. White Guyn, the team compiled a 4–3 record.

== Schedule ==
Date	Opponent	Site	Result	Source
October 10	Berea	State athletic field; Lexington, KY	W 17–0	
October 17	at Tennessee	Waite Field; Knoxville, TN	L 0–7	
October 19	at Maryville (TN)	Knoxville, TN	W 18–0	
October 31	Sewanee	State athletic field; Lexington, KY	L 0–12	
November 7	at Michigan	Ferry Field; Ann Arbor, MI	L 0–62	
November 14	Rose Polytechnic	State athletic field; Lexington, KY	W 12–10	
November 26	Central University (KY)	State athletic field; Lexington, KY (rivalry)	W 40–0	
