= 1908 Oklahoma A&M Aggies football team =

American college football season

1908 Oklahoma A&M Aggies football
- Conference: Independent
- Record: 4–4
- Head coach: Ed Parry (1st season)

1908 Southern college football independents records
	Conf.			Overall
Team	W	L	T	W		L		T
Southwestern Louisiana Industrial		–		6	–	0	–	0
Virginia		–		7	–	0	–	1
Rollins		–		4	–	0	–	1
George Washington		–		8	–	1	–	1
Oklahoma		–		8	–	1	–	1
Tulane		–		7	–	1	–	0
North Carolina A&M		–		6	–	1	–	0
The Citadel		–		4	–	1	–	1
Navy		–		9	–	2	–	1
Florida		–		5	–	2	–	1
TCU		–		6	–	3	–	0
VMI		–		4	–	2	–	0
Davidson		–		5	–	3	–	1
Baylor		–		5	–	3	–	0
West Virginia		–		5	–	3	–	0
Kentucky State		–		4	–	3	–	0
Louisiana Industrial		–		4	–	3	–	1
Arkansas		–		5	–	4	–	0
Texas		–		5	–	4	–	0
VPI		–		5	–	4	–	0
Arkansas State Normal		–		3	–	3	–	0
Chattanooga		–		4	–	4	–	0
North Carolina		–		3	–	3	–	3
Oklahoma A&M		–		4	–	4	–	0
Delaware		–		3	–	4	–	1
Kendall		–		2	–	3	–	0
South Carolina		–		3	–	5	–	1
Texas A&M		–		3	–	5	–	0
Georgetown		–		2	–	4	–	1
Howard (AL)		–		2	–	4	–	0
Maryland		–		3	–	8	–	0
Birmingham		–		0	–	3	–	3
Stetson		–		0	–	1	–	1
Wake Forest		–		1	–	4	–	0
Goldey College		–		0	–	2	–	1
Mississippi College		–		0	–	1	–	0
Southwest Texas State		–		0	–	2	–	0
Marshall		–		0	–	6	–	0

The 1908 Oklahoma A&M Aggies football team represented Oklahoma A&M College in the 1908 college football season. This was the eighth year of football at A&M and the first under Ed Parry. The Aggies played their home games in Stillwater, Oklahoma. They finished the season 4–4.

== Schedule ==
Date	Opponent	Site	Result	Attendance
September 30	at Central State Normal	Edmond, OK	L 5–8	
October 5	Oklahoma	Stillwater, OK (Bedlam)	L 0–18	1,000
October 13	Northwestern Oklahoma State	Alva, OK	L 0–18	
October 27	Epworth	Stillwater, OK	W 18–0	
November 12	at Southwestern (KS)	Winfield, KS	W 6–0	
November 14	at Kansas State	Manhattan, KS	L 10–40	
November 21	Chilocco	Stillwater, OK	W 30–0	
November 26	Central State Normal	Stillwater, OK	W 17–0	
