= 1908 Louisiana Industrial football team =

American college football season

1908 Louisiana Industrial football
- Conference: Independent
- Record: 4–3–1
- Head coach: A. L. Cornell (1st season)
- Captain: A. A. Smith

1908 Southern college football independents records
	Conf.			Overall
Team	W	L	T	W		L		T
Southwestern Louisiana Industrial		–		6	–	0	–	0
Virginia		–		7	–	0	–	1
Rollins		–		4	–	0	–	1
George Washington		–		8	–	1	–	1
Oklahoma		–		8	–	1	–	1
Tulane		–		7	–	1	–	0
North Carolina A&M		–		6	–	1	–	0
The Citadel		–		4	–	1	–	1
Navy		–		9	–	2	–	1
Florida		–		5	–	2	–	1
TCU		–		6	–	3	–	0
VMI		–		4	–	2	–	0
Davidson		–		5	–	3	–	1
Baylor		–		5	–	3	–	0
West Virginia		–		5	–	3	–	0
Kentucky State		–		4	–	3	–	0
Louisiana Industrial		–		4	–	3	–	1
Arkansas		–		5	–	4	–	0
Texas		–		5	–	4	–	0
VPI		–		5	–	4	–	0
Arkansas State Normal		–		3	–	3	–	0
Chattanooga		–		4	–	4	–	0
North Carolina		–		3	–	3	–	3
Oklahoma A&M		–		4	–	4	–	0
Delaware		–		3	–	4	–	1
Kendall		–		2	–	3	–	0
South Carolina		–		3	–	5	–	1
Texas A&M		–		3	–	5	–	0
Georgetown		–		2	–	4	–	1
Howard (AL)		–		2	–	4	–	0
Maryland		–		3	–	8	–	0
Birmingham		–		0	–	3	–	3
Stetson		–		0	–	1	–	1
Wake Forest		–		1	–	4	–	0
Goldey College		–		0	–	2	–	1
Mississippi College		–		0	–	1	–	0
Southwest Texas State		–		0	–	2	–	0
Marshall		–		0	–	6	–	0

The 1908 Louisiana Industrial football team was an American football team that represented the Louisiana Industrial Institute—now known as Louisiana Tech University—as an independent during the 1908 college football season. In their first and only season under head coach A. L. Cornell, Louisiana Industrial compiled a record of 4–3–1. The team's captain was A. A. Smith.

== Schedule ==
Date	Opponent	Site	Result	Source
October 5	16th Infantry Regiment / Fort Logan H. Roots	Ruston, LA	W 28–0	
October 10	at Mississippi A&M	Hardy Field; Starkville, MS	L 0–47	
October 23	Shreveport Athletic Club	Ruston, LA	T 0–0	
October 29	Hendrix	Ruston, LA	W 72–0	
November 2	at Henderson	Arkadelphia, AR	L 10–11	
November 4	at 16th Infantry Regiment / Fort Logan H. Roots	Little Rock, AR	W 18–6	
November 14	Ouachita Baptist	Athletic Park; Ruston, LA	W 77–5	
November 23	LSU	Ruston, LA	L 0–22	
