= 1908 Wake Forest Baptists football team =

American college football season

1908 Wake Forest Baptists football
- Conference: Independent
- Record: 1–4
- Head coach: A. P. Hall Jr. (1st season)
- Captain: W. H. Hipps

1908 Southern college football independents records
	Conf.			Overall
Team	W	L	T	W		L		T
Southwestern Louisiana Industrial		–		6	–	0	–	0
Virginia		–		7	–	0	–	1
Rollins		–		4	–	0	–	1
George Washington		–		8	–	1	–	1
Oklahoma		–		8	–	1	–	1
Tulane		–		7	–	1	–	0
North Carolina A&M		–		6	–	1	–	0
The Citadel		–		4	–	1	–	1
Navy		–		9	–	2	–	1
Florida		–		5	–	2	–	1
TCU		–		6	–	3	–	0
VMI		–		4	–	2	–	0
Davidson		–		5	–	3	–	1
Baylor		–		5	–	3	–	0
West Virginia		–		5	–	3	–	0
Kentucky State		–		4	–	3	–	0
Louisiana Industrial		–		4	–	3	–	1
Arkansas		–		5	–	4	–	0
Texas		–		5	–	4	–	0
VPI		–		5	–	4	–	0
Arkansas State Normal		–		3	–	3	–	0
Chattanooga		–		4	–	4	–	0
North Carolina		–		3	–	3	–	3
Oklahoma A&M		–		4	–	4	–	0
Delaware		–		3	–	4	–	1
Kendall		–		2	–	3	–	0
South Carolina		–		3	–	5	–	1
Texas A&M		–		3	–	5	–	0
Georgetown		–		2	–	4	–	1
Howard (AL)		–		2	–	4	–	0
Maryland		–		3	–	8	–	0
Birmingham		–		0	–	3	–	3
Stetson		–		0	–	1	–	1
Wake Forest		–		1	–	4	–	0
Goldey College		–		0	–	2	–	1
Mississippi College		–		0	–	1	–	0
Southwest Texas State		–		0	–	2	–	0
Marshall		–		0	–	6	–	0

The 1908 Wake Forest Baptists football team was an American football team that represented Wake Forest College (now known as Wake Forest University) as an independent during the 1908 college football season. In their first year under head coach A. P. Hall Jr., the team compiled a 1–4 record.

== Schedule ==
Date	Opponent	Site	Result	Attendance	Source
September 26	at North Carolina	Campus Athletic Field; Chapel Hill, NC (rivalry)	L 0–17		
October 3	North Carolina A&M	Wake Forest, NC (rivalry)	L 0–25		
October 10	Warrenton High School	Wake Forest, NC	W 21–0		
November 14	at Davidson	Sprunt Athletic Field; Davidson, NC	L 4–31		
November 21	at North Carolina A&M	Riddick Stadium; Raleigh, NC	L 0–76	500	
