= 1908 Oklahoma Sooners football team =

American college football season

1908 Oklahoma Sooners football
- Conference: Independent
- Record: 8–1–1
- Head coach: Bennie Owen (4th season)
- Captain: Key Wolf
- Home stadium: Boyd Field

1908 Southern college football independents records
	Conf.			Overall
Team	W	L	T	W		L		T
Southwestern Louisiana Industrial		–		6	–	0	–	0
Virginia		–		7	–	0	–	1
Rollins		–		4	–	0	–	1
George Washington		–		8	–	1	–	1
Oklahoma		–		8	–	1	–	1
Tulane		–		7	–	1	–	0
North Carolina A&M		–		6	–	1	–	0
The Citadel		–		4	–	1	–	1
Navy		–		9	–	2	–	1
Florida		–		5	–	2	–	1
TCU		–		6	–	3	–	0
VMI		–		4	–	2	–	0
Davidson		–		5	–	3	–	1
Baylor		–		5	–	3	–	0
West Virginia		–		5	–	3	–	0
Kentucky State		–		4	–	3	–	0
Louisiana Industrial		–		4	–	3	–	1
Arkansas		–		5	–	4	–	0
Texas		–		5	–	4	–	0
VPI		–		5	–	4	–	0
Arkansas State Normal		–		3	–	3	–	0
Chattanooga		–		4	–	4	–	0
North Carolina		–		3	–	3	–	3
Oklahoma A&M		–		4	–	4	–	0
Delaware		–		3	–	4	–	1
Kendall		–		2	–	3	–	0
South Carolina		–		3	–	5	–	1
Texas A&M		–		3	–	5	–	0
Georgetown		–		2	–	4	–	1
Howard (AL)		–		2	–	4	–	0
Maryland		–		3	–	8	–	0
Birmingham		–		0	–	3	–	3
Stetson		–		0	–	1	–	1
Wake Forest		–		1	–	4	–	0
Goldey College		–		0	–	2	–	1
Mississippi College		–		0	–	1	–	0
Southwest Texas State		–		0	–	2	–	0
Marshall		–		0	–	6	–	0

The 1908 Oklahoma Sooners football team represented the University of Oklahoma as an independent during the 1908 college football season. In their fourth year under head coach Bennie Owen, the Sooners compiled an 8–1–1 record, and outscored their opponents by a combined total of 272 to 35.

== Schedule ==
Date	Time	Opponent	Site	Result	Source
September 25		at Central State Normal	Edmond, OK	W 51–5	
October 3		at Oklahoma A&M	Stillwater, OK (rivalry)	W 18–0	
October 10		Kingfisher	Boyd Field; Norman, OK	W 51–0	
October 17		at Kansas	McCook Field; Lawrence, KS	L 0–11	
October 23		at Kansas State	Manhattan, KS	W 33–4	
October 30	4:00 p.m.	Arkansas	Boyd Field; Norman, OK	W 27–5	
November 5		Epworth	Boyd Field; Norman, OK	W 24–0	
November 13		Texas	Boyd Field; Norman, OK (rivalry)	W 50–0	
November 19		Fairmount	Boyd Field; Norman, OK	W 12–4	
November 24		at Washburn	Topeka, KS	T 6–6	

== Roster ==
1908 Oklahoma Sooners football
Charles Armstrong; Ralph Campbell; Roy Campbell; Porter English; Dave Fox	Frank Long; James Nairn; Claude Pickard; Earle Radcliffe	Hugh Roberts; Vernon Walling; Charles W. Wantland; Key Wolf
