= 1908 George Washington Hatchetites football team =

American college football season

1908 George Washington Hatchetites football

Southern champion
- Conference: Independent
- Record: 8–1–1
- Head coach: Fred K. Nielsen (2nd season)
- Home stadium: American League Park

1908 Southern college football independents records
	Conf.			Overall
Team	W	L	T	W		L		T
Southwestern Louisiana Industrial		–		6	–	0	–	0
Virginia		–		7	–	0	–	1
Rollins		–		4	–	0	–	1
George Washington		–		8	–	1	–	1
Oklahoma		–		8	–	1	–	1
Tulane		–		7	–	1	–	0
North Carolina A&M		–		6	–	1	–	0
The Citadel		–		4	–	1	–	1
Navy		–		9	–	2	–	1
Florida		–		5	–	2	–	1
TCU		–		6	–	3	–	0
VMI		–		4	–	2	–	0
Davidson		–		5	–	3	–	1
Baylor		–		5	–	3	–	0
West Virginia		–		5	–	3	–	0
Kentucky State		–		4	–	3	–	0
Louisiana Industrial		–		4	–	3	–	1
Arkansas		–		5	–	4	–	0
Texas		–		5	–	4	–	0
VPI		–		5	–	4	–	0
Arkansas State Normal		–		3	–	3	–	0
Chattanooga		–		4	–	4	–	0
North Carolina		–		3	–	3	–	3
Oklahoma A&M		–		4	–	4	–	0
Delaware		–		3	–	4	–	1
Kendall		–		2	–	3	–	0
South Carolina		–		3	–	5	–	1
Texas A&M		–		3	–	5	–	0
Georgetown		–		2	–	4	–	1
Howard (AL)		–		2	–	4	–	0
Maryland		–		3	–	8	–	0
Birmingham		–		0	–	3	–	3
Stetson		–		0	–	1	–	1
Wake Forest		–		1	–	4	–	0
Goldey College		–		0	–	2	–	1
Mississippi College		–		0	–	1	–	0
Southwest Texas State		–		0	–	2	–	0
Marshall		–		0	–	6	–	0

The 1908 George Washington Hatchetites football team represented George Washington University in the 1908 college football season. Led by second year coach Fred K. Nielsen, the team went 8–1–1 and were one of two teams given the mythical title of Southern champion. The Colonials outscored opponents 297 to 28. Curley Byrd was a member of the team.

== Schedule ==
Date	Time	Opponent	Site	Result	Source
October 3		at Western Maryland	American League Park; Washington, DC	W 18–0	
October 10		Eastern (VA)	American League Park; Washington, DC	W 21–0	
October 17		at Baltimore Medical	Baltimore, MD	W 33–0	
October 24		Fort Myer	Washington, DC	W 36–0	
October 28		at Navy	Worden Field; Annapolis, MD	L 0–17	
October 31		University of Maryland, Baltimore	American League Park; Washington, DC	W 77–0	
November 7		Washington and Lee	Washington, DC	W 44–6	
November 14		at VPI	Gibboney Field; Blacksburg, VA	W 6–0	
November 21		at Maryland	College Park, MD	W 57–0	
November 26	2:30 p.m.	Bucknell	American League Park; Washington, DC	T 5–5	
