= 1908 West Virginia Mountaineers football team =

American college football season

1908 West Virginia Mountaineers football
- Conference: Independent
- Record: 5–3
- Head coach: Charles Augustus Lueder (1st season)
- Captain: Mont McIntire

1908 Southern college football independents records
	Conf.			Overall
Team	W	L	T	W		L		T
Southwestern Louisiana Industrial		–		6	–	0	–	0
Virginia		–		7	–	0	–	1
Rollins		–		4	–	0	–	1
George Washington		–		8	–	1	–	1
Oklahoma		–		8	–	1	–	1
Tulane		–		7	–	1	–	0
North Carolina A&M		–		6	–	1	–	0
The Citadel		–		4	–	1	–	1
Navy		–		9	–	2	–	1
Florida		–		5	–	2	–	1
TCU		–		6	–	3	–	0
VMI		–		4	–	2	–	0
Davidson		–		5	–	3	–	1
Baylor		–		5	–	3	–	0
West Virginia		–		5	–	3	–	0
Kentucky State		–		4	–	3	–	0
Louisiana Industrial		–		4	–	3	–	1
Arkansas		–		5	–	4	–	0
Texas		–		5	–	4	–	0
VPI		–		5	–	4	–	0
Arkansas State Normal		–		3	–	3	–	0
Chattanooga		–		4	–	4	–	0
North Carolina		–		3	–	3	–	3
Oklahoma A&M		–		4	–	4	–	0
Delaware		–		3	–	4	–	1
Kendall		–		2	–	3	–	0
South Carolina		–		3	–	5	–	1
Texas A&M		–		3	–	5	–	0
Georgetown		–		2	–	4	–	1
Howard (AL)		–		2	–	4	–	0
Maryland		–		3	–	8	–	0
Birmingham		–		0	–	3	–	3
Stetson		–		0	–	1	–	1
Wake Forest		–		1	–	4	–	0
Goldey College		–		0	–	2	–	1
Mississippi College		–		0	–	1	–	0
Southwest Texas State		–		0	–	2	–	0
Marshall		–		0	–	6	–	0

The 1908 West Virginia Mountaineers football team was an American football team that represented West Virginia University as an independent during the 1908 college football season. In its first season under head coach Charles Augustus Lueder, the team compiled a 5–3 record and outscored opponents by a total of 101 to 29. Mont M. McIntyre was the team captain.

== Schedule ==
Date	Time	Opponent	Site	Result	Attendance	Source
September 26		at Penn	Franklin Field; Philadelphia, PA	L 0–6		
October 17	3:00 p.m.	at Carnegie Tech	Tech Park; Pittsburgh, PA	W 16–0		
October 24		at Penn State	Beaver Field; State College, PA (rivalry)	L 0–12		
October 31		vs. Marietta	Parkersburg, WV	W 12–0		
November 7		at Pittsburgh	Exposition Park; Pittsburgh, PA (rivalry)	L 0–11	4,000	
November 14		Pittsburgh Lyceum	Morgantown, WV	W 4–0		
November 21		Bethany (WV)	Morgantown, WV	W 47–0		
November 28		Westminster (PA)	Morgantown, WV	W 22–0		
All times are in Eastern time
