= 1908 Kendall Orange and Black football team =

American college football season

1908 Kendall Orange and Black football
- Conference: Independent
- Record: 2–3
- Head coach: Sam P. McBirney (1st season)
- Home stadium: Athletic Park

1908 Southern college football independents records
	Conf.			Overall
Team	W	L	T	W		L		T
Southwestern Louisiana Industrial		–		6	–	0	–	0
Virginia		–		7	–	0	–	1
Rollins		–		4	–	0	–	1
George Washington		–		8	–	1	–	1
Oklahoma		–		8	–	1	–	1
Tulane		–		7	–	1	–	0
North Carolina A&M		–		6	–	1	–	0
The Citadel		–		4	–	1	–	1
Navy		–		9	–	2	–	1
Florida		–		5	–	2	–	1
TCU		–		6	–	3	–	0
VMI		–		4	–	2	–	0
Davidson		–		5	–	3	–	1
Baylor		–		5	–	3	–	0
West Virginia		–		5	–	3	–	0
Kentucky State		–		4	–	3	–	0
Louisiana Industrial		–		4	–	3	–	1
Arkansas		–		5	–	4	–	0
Texas		–		5	–	4	–	0
VPI		–		5	–	4	–	0
Arkansas State Normal		–		3	–	3	–	0
Chattanooga		–		4	–	4	–	0
North Carolina		–		3	–	3	–	3
Oklahoma A&M		–		4	–	4	–	0
Delaware		–		3	–	4	–	1
Kendall		–		2	–	3	–	0
South Carolina		–		3	–	5	–	1
Texas A&M		–		3	–	5	–	0
Georgetown		–		2	–	4	–	1
Howard (AL)		–		2	–	4	–	0
Maryland		–		3	–	8	–	0
Birmingham		–		0	–	3	–	3
Stetson		–		0	–	1	–	1
Wake Forest		–		1	–	4	–	0
Goldey College		–		0	–	2	–	1
Mississippi College		–		0	–	1	–	0
Southwest Texas State		–		0	–	2	–	0
Marshall		–		0	–	6	–	0

The 1908 Kendall Orange and Black football team represented Henry Kendall College (later renamed the University of Tulsa) during the 1908 college football season. This was the first season that the institution was located in Tulsa, Oklahoma. In its first season under head coach Sam P. McBirney, the team compiled a 2–3 record and outscored its opponents by a total of 80 to 43. The team played no intercollegiate football games. Four of its games were played against local high schools, and the fifth was against the Outrigger Canoe Club from Pawhuska, Oklahoma.

== Schedule ==
Date	Opponent	Site	Result
October 30	at Muskogee High School	Muskogee, OK	L 5–10
November 7	Muskogee High School	Athletic Park; Tulsa, OK	L 0–10
November 13	at Osage Indians	Pawhuska, OK	L 11–23
November 20	at Claremore Prep	Claremore, OK	W 48–0
November 26	Central High School	Athletic Park; Tulsa, OK	W 16–0
