= 1908 Davidson football team =

American college football season

1908 Davidson football
- Conference: Independent
- Record: 5–3–1
- Head coach: John Nathan Levine (1st season)
- Home stadium: Sprunt Athletic Field

1908 Southern college football independents records
	Conf.			Overall
Team	W	L	T	W		L		T
Southwestern Louisiana Industrial		–		6	–	0	–	0
Virginia		–		7	–	0	–	1
Rollins		–		4	–	0	–	1
George Washington		–		8	–	1	–	1
Oklahoma		–		8	–	1	–	1
Tulane		–		7	–	1	–	0
North Carolina A&M		–		6	–	1	–	0
The Citadel		–		4	–	1	–	1
Navy		–		9	–	2	–	1
Florida		–		5	–	2	–	1
TCU		–		6	–	3	–	0
VMI		–		4	–	2	–	0
Davidson		–		5	–	3	–	1
Baylor		–		5	–	3	–	0
West Virginia		–		5	–	3	–	0
Kentucky State		–		4	–	3	–	0
Louisiana Industrial		–		4	–	3	–	1
Arkansas		–		5	–	4	–	0
Texas		–		5	–	4	–	0
VPI		–		5	–	4	–	0
Arkansas State Normal		–		3	–	3	–	0
Chattanooga		–		4	–	4	–	0
North Carolina		–		3	–	3	–	3
Oklahoma A&M		–		4	–	4	–	0
Delaware		–		3	–	4	–	1
Kendall		–		2	–	3	–	0
South Carolina		–		3	–	5	–	1
Texas A&M		–		3	–	5	–	0
Georgetown		–		2	–	4	–	1
Howard (AL)		–		2	–	4	–	0
Maryland		–		3	–	8	–	0
Birmingham		–		0	–	3	–	3
Stetson		–		0	–	1	–	1
Wake Forest		–		1	–	4	–	0
Goldey College		–		0	–	2	–	1
Mississippi College		–		0	–	1	–	0
Southwest Texas State		–		0	–	2	–	0
Marshall		–		0	–	6	–	0

The 1908 Davidson football team was an American football team that represented the Davidson College as an independent during the 1908 college football season. In their first year under head coach John Nathan Levine, the team compiled a 5–3–1 record.

== Schedule ==
Date	Opponent	Site	Result	Attendance	Source
October 3	Morganton Mutes	Sprunt Athletic Field; Davidson, NC	W 41–0		
October 6	North Carolina Medical College	Sprunt Athletic Field; Davidson, NC	W 12–0		
October 9	at Virginia	Lambeth Field; Charlottesville, VA	L 0–12		
October 17	vs. North Carolina	New League Park; Wilmington, NC	T 0–0	2,500	
October 28	vs. Clemson	State Fair Grounds; Columbia, SC	W 13–2		
October 29	at South Carolina	State Fair Grounds; Columbia, SC	W 22–0		
November 7	vs. North Carolina A&M	Latta Park; Charlotte, NC	L 0–21	1,500	
November 14	Wake Forest	Sprunt Athletic Field; Davidson, NC	W 31–4		
November 21	at Georgia	Herty Field; Athens, GA	L 0–2		
