= 1908 VMI Keydets football team =

American college football season

1908 VMI Keydets football
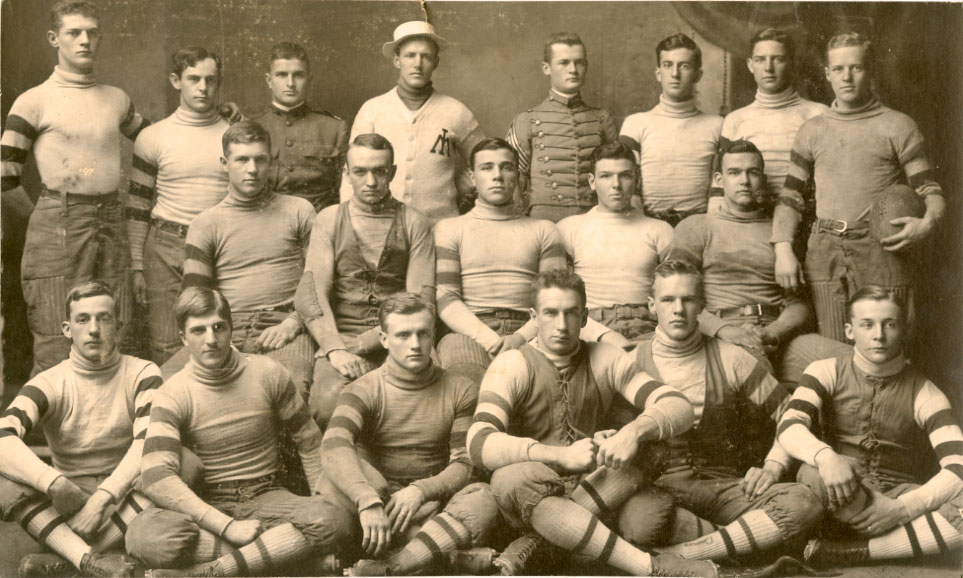
- Conference: Independent
- Record: 4–2
- Head coach: Charles Roller (2nd season)

1908 Southern college football independents records
	Conf.			Overall
Team	W	L	T	W		L		T
Southwestern Louisiana Industrial		–		6	–	0	–	0
Virginia		–		7	–	0	–	1
Rollins		–		4	–	0	–	1
George Washington		–		8	–	1	–	1
Oklahoma		–		8	–	1	–	1
Tulane		–		7	–	1	–	0
North Carolina A&M		–		6	–	1	–	0
The Citadel		–		4	–	1	–	1
Navy		–		9	–	2	–	1
Florida		–		5	–	2	–	1
TCU		–		6	–	3	–	0
VMI		–		4	–	2	–	0
Davidson		–		5	–	3	–	1
Baylor		–		5	–	3	–	0
West Virginia		–		5	–	3	–	0
Kentucky State		–		4	–	3	–	0
Louisiana Industrial		–		4	–	3	–	1
Arkansas		–		5	–	4	–	0
Texas		–		5	–	4	–	0
VPI		–		5	–	4	–	0
Arkansas State Normal		–		3	–	3	–	0
Chattanooga		–		4	–	4	–	0
North Carolina		–		3	–	3	–	3
Oklahoma A&M		–		4	–	4	–	0
Delaware		–		3	–	4	–	1
Kendall		–		2	–	3	–	0
South Carolina		–		3	–	5	–	1
Texas A&M		–		3	–	5	–	0
Georgetown		–		2	–	4	–	1
Howard (AL)		–		2	–	4	–	0
Maryland		–		3	–	8	–	0
Birmingham		–		0	–	3	–	3
Stetson		–		0	–	1	–	1
Wake Forest		–		1	–	4	–	0
Goldey College		–		0	–	2	–	1
Mississippi College		–		0	–	1	–	0
Southwest Texas State		–		0	–	2	–	0
Marshall		–		0	–	6	–	0

The 1908 VMI Keydets football team represented the Virginia Military Institute (VMI) in their 18th season of organized football. VMI went 4–2 in a fairly short season under head coach Charles Roller.

== Schedule ==
Date	Opponent	Site	Result
October 3	William & Mary	Unknown; Lexington, VA (rivalry)	W 21–0
October 10	Hampden–Sydney	Unknown; Lexington, VA	W 40–0
October 13	Staunton Military Academy	Unknown; Lexington, VA	W 57–0
October 17	St. John's (MD)	Unknown; Lexington, VA	L 2–10
October 24	vs. VPI	Unknown; Roanoke, VA (rivalry)	L 0–10
October 31	vs. Roanoke	Unknown; Lexington, VA	W 37–0

- On October 13, when VMI played Staunton Military, Charles Roller was away, being replaced by assistant coach Pete Krebs, who also coached the basketball team that year.
- On October 31, VMI's George Cook Ferebee died from a blow to the head during the Keydets game against Roanoke College. The game was stopped immediately when his death was announced, after he was carried away to a nearby hospital.
