= 1908 Florida football team =

American college football season

1908 Florida football
- Conference: Independent
- Record: 5–2–1
- Head coach: Jack Forsythe (3rd season)
- Captain: William Wetmore "Gric" Gibbs
- Home stadium: The Ballpark

1908 Southern college football independents records
	Conf.			Overall
Team	W	L	T	W		L		T
Southwestern Louisiana Industrial		–		6	–	0	–	0
Virginia		–		7	–	0	–	1
Rollins		–		4	–	0	–	1
George Washington		–		8	–	1	–	1
Oklahoma		–		8	–	1	–	1
Tulane		–		7	–	1	–	0
North Carolina A&M		–		6	–	1	–	0
The Citadel		–		4	–	1	–	1
Navy		–		9	–	2	–	1
Florida		–		5	–	2	–	1
TCU		–		6	–	3	–	0
VMI		–		4	–	2	–	0
Davidson		–		5	–	3	–	1
Baylor		–		5	–	3	–	0
West Virginia		–		5	–	3	–	0
Kentucky State		–		4	–	3	–	0
Louisiana Industrial		–		4	–	3	–	1
Arkansas		–		5	–	4	–	0
Texas		–		5	–	4	–	0
VPI		–		5	–	4	–	0
Arkansas State Normal		–		3	–	3	–	0
Chattanooga		–		4	–	4	–	0
North Carolina		–		3	–	3	–	3
Oklahoma A&M		–		4	–	4	–	0
Delaware		–		3	–	4	–	1
Kendall		–		2	–	3	–	0
South Carolina		–		3	–	5	–	1
Texas A&M		–		3	–	5	–	0
Georgetown		–		2	–	4	–	1
Howard (AL)		–		2	–	4	–	0
Maryland		–		3	–	8	–	0
Birmingham		–		0	–	3	–	3
Stetson		–		0	–	1	–	1
Wake Forest		–		1	–	4	–	0
Goldey College		–		0	–	2	–	1
Mississippi College		–		0	–	1	–	0
Southwest Texas State		–		0	–	2	–	0
Marshall		–		0	–	6	–	0

The 1908 Florida football team represented the University of Florida during the 1908 college football season. The season was Jack Forsythe's third and last as the head coach of the University of Florida football team. Forsythe's 1908 Florida football team posted a record of 5–2–1 in their third varsity season.

== Before the season ==
The team was captained by veteran transfer William Gibbs. It was the first season for a talented Gainesville product, Dummy Taylor. The backfield also included Charlie Bartleson Jim Vidal, and William A. Shands, future state senator and namesake of Shands Hospital.

One story of Florida becoming the "Florida Gators" originates in 1908. Gainesville shop owner ordered orange and blue pennants with a gator emblem from the Michie Company, drawing inspiration from the University of Virginia.

== Schedule ==
Date	Opponent	Site	Result
October 10	at Mercer	Macon, GA	L 0–24
October 17	at Riverside Athletic Club	Baseball Park; Jacksonville, FL	W 4–0
October 21	Gainesville Athletic Club	The Ballpark; Gainesville, FL	W 37–5
October 24	at Columbia College	Lake City, FL	W 6–0
November 1	at Rollins	Winter Park, FL	L 0–5
November 7	Stetson	The Ballpark; Gainesville, FL	W 6–5
November 21	Riverside Athletic Club	The Ballpark; Gainesville, FL	W 37–0
November 26	at Stetson	DeLand, FL	T 0–0

== Game summaries ==
=== Mercer ===
The Florida football team opened the season with a loss to the Mercer Baptists for the third consecutive season, 24–0. Mercer outweighed Florida by 20 pounds.

The starting lineup was Malhorton (left end), Rader (left tackle), Vanfleet (left guard), Parker (center), Videll (right guard), J. Taylor (right tackle), Shands (right end), Thompson (quarterback), Bartleson (left halfback), E. Taylor (right halfback), Gibbs (fullback).

=== Riverside A. C. ===
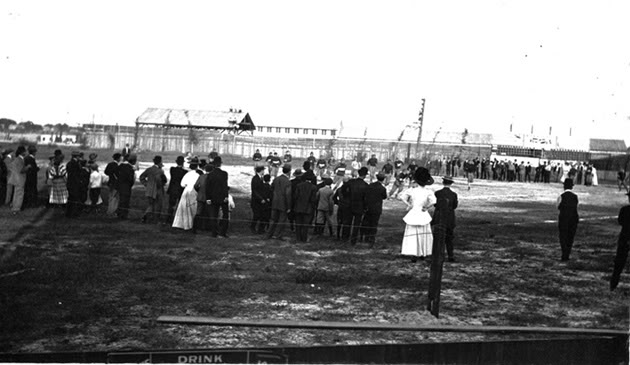
UF at Riverside, 1908

Florida beat the Riverside Athletic Club of Jacksonville twice. The first win was 4–0. Former Gator Roy Corbett coached and played right halfback for Riverside.

=== Gainesville A. C. ===
The Gainesville Athletic Club fell to Florida 37–5.

=== Columbia College ===
Columbia College of Lake City was beaten 6–0.

=== Rollins ===
Team	1	2	Total
Florida	0	0	0
• Rollins	0	5	5

- Location: Winter Park, FL

Florida lost to the state champion Rollins Tars 5–0. Rollins' Harman broke away for a 30-yard touchdown in the second half.

=== Stetson ===
Florida also played the Stetson Hatters for the first time, beating them 6–5 on the Orange and Blue's home field in Gainesville. Dummy Taylor's extra point decided the win over Stetson, after a Charlie Bartleson touchdown run.

=== Riverside A. C. ===
The second win over Riverside was 37–0.

=== Stetson ===
Team	1	2	Total
Florida	0	0	0
Stetson	0	0	0

- Location: DeLand, FL

Florida tied Stetson 0–0 in a rematch on the Hatters' home field in DeLand, Florida.

The starting lineup was Moody (left end), Taylor (left tackle), Shands (left guard), Parker (center), McMillan (right guard), Rader (right tackle), Haughton (right end), Bartleson (quarterback), Gibbs (left halfback), E. Taylor (right halfback), Vidal (fullback).

== Postseason ==
Forsythe finished his three-year tenure as Florida's football coach with an overall record of 14–6–2.

== Bibliography ==
- Horne, Larry E. (2012). Florida Gators IQ. ISBN 1-4499-8947-0.
- McEwen, Tom (1974). The Gators: A Story of Florida Football. Huntsville, Alabama: The Strode Publishers. ISBN 0-87397-025-X.
