= 1908 North Carolina Tar Heels football team =

American college football season

1908 North Carolina Tar Heels football
- Conference: Independent
- Record: 3–3–3
- Head coach: Edward L. Greene (1st season)
- Captain: Romy Story
- Home stadium: Campus Athletic Field (II)

1908 Southern college football independents records
| | Conf. | | | Overall |
| Team | W | L | T | W | | L | | T |
|---|---|---|---|---|---|---|---|---|
| Southwestern Louisiana Industrial | | – | | 6 | – | 0 | – | 0 |
| Virginia | | – | | 7 | – | 0 | – | 1 |
| Rollins | | – | | 4 | – | 0 | – | 1 |
| George Washington | | – | | 8 | – | 1 | – | 1 |
| Oklahoma | | – | | 8 | – | 1 | – | 1 |
| Tulane | | – | | 7 | – | 1 | – | 0 |
| North Carolina A&M | | – | | 6 | – | 1 | – | 0 |
| The Citadel | | – | | 4 | – | 1 | – | 1 |
| Navy | | – | | 9 | – | 2 | – | 1 |
| Florida | | – | | 5 | – | 2 | – | 1 |
| TCU | | – | | 6 | – | 3 | – | 0 |
| VMI | | – | | 4 | – | 2 | – | 0 |
| Davidson | | – | | 5 | – | 3 | – | 1 |
| Baylor | | – | | 5 | – | 3 | – | 0 |
| West Virginia | | – | | 5 | – | 3 | – | 0 |
| Kentucky State | | – | | 4 | – | 3 | – | 0 |
| Louisiana Industrial | | – | | 4 | – | 3 | – | 1 |
| Arkansas | | – | | 5 | – | 4 | – | 0 |
| Texas | | – | | 5 | – | 4 | – | 0 |
| VPI | | – | | 5 | – | 4 | – | 0 |
| Arkansas State Normal | | – | | 3 | – | 3 | – | 0 |
| Chattanooga | | – | | 4 | – | 4 | – | 0 |
| North Carolina | | – | | 3 | – | 3 | – | 3 |
| Oklahoma A&M | | – | | 4 | – | 4 | – | 0 |
| Delaware | | – | | 3 | – | 4 | – | 1 |
| Kendall | | – | | 2 | – | 3 | – | 0 |
| South Carolina | | – | | 3 | – | 5 | – | 1 |
| Texas A&M | | – | | 3 | – | 5 | – | 0 |
| Georgetown | | – | | 2 | – | 4 | – | 1 |
| Howard (AL) | | – | | 2 | – | 4 | – | 0 |
| Maryland | | – | | 3 | – | 8 | – | 0 |
| Birmingham | | – | | 0 | – | 3 | – | 3 |
| Stetson | | – | | 0 | – | 1 | – | 1 |
| Wake Forest | | – | | 1 | – | 4 | – | 0 |
| Goldey College | | – | | 0 | – | 2 | – | 1 |
| Mississippi College | | – | | 0 | – | 1 | – | 0 |
| Southwest Texas State | | – | | 0 | – | 2 | – | 0 |
| Marshall | | – | | 0 | – | 6 | – | 0 |

The 1908 North Carolina Tar Heels football team represented the University of North Carolina in the 1908 college football season. The team captain of the 1908 season was Romy Story.

== Schedule ==
| Date | Time | Opponent | Site | Result | Attendance | Source |
|---|---|---|---|---|---|---|
| September 26 | | Wake Forest | Campus Athletic Field (II); Chapel Hill, NC (rivalry) | W 17–0 | | |
| October 3 | | at Tennessee | Wait Field; Knoxville, TN | L 0–12 | 2,000 | |
| October 10 | 3:00 p.m. | vs. Washington and Lee | Casino Park; Newport News, VA | T 0–0 | | |
| October 17 | | Davidson | New League Park; Wilmington, NC | T 0–0 | 2,500 | |
| October 26 | 4:00 p.m. | at Georgetown | Georgetown Field; Washington, DC | T 6–6 | | |
| October 31 | | Richmond | Campus Athletic Field (II); Chapel Hill, NC | W 17–12 | | |
| November 7 | 3:30 p.m. | vs. VPI | Broad Street Park (I); Richmond, VA | L 0–10 | 3,000 | |
| November 14 | | South Carolina | Campus Athletic Field (II); Chapel Hill, NC (rivalry) | W 22–0 | | |
| November 26 | 2:00 p.m. | vs. Virginia | Broad Street Park (I); Richmond, VA (South's Oldest Rivalry) | L 0–31 | 12,000 | |
