= 1908 Georgetown Blue and Gray football team =

American college football season

1908 Georgetown Blue and Gray football
- Conference: Independent
- Record: 2–4–1
- Head coach: William Newman (1st season)
- Captain: Eddie Miller
- Home stadium: Georgetown Field

1908 Southern college football independents records
	Conf.			Overall
Team	W	L	T	W		L		T
Southwestern Louisiana Industrial		–		6	–	0	–	0
Virginia		–		7	–	0	–	1
Rollins		–		4	–	0	–	1
George Washington		–		8	–	1	–	1
Oklahoma		–		8	–	1	–	1
Tulane		–		7	–	1	–	0
North Carolina A&M		–		6	–	1	–	0
The Citadel		–		4	–	1	–	1
Navy		–		9	–	2	–	1
Florida		–		5	–	2	–	1
TCU		–		6	–	3	–	0
VMI		–		4	–	2	–	0
Davidson		–		5	–	3	–	1
Baylor		–		5	–	3	–	0
West Virginia		–		5	–	3	–	0
Kentucky State		–		4	–	3	–	0
Louisiana Industrial		–		4	–	3	–	1
Arkansas		–		5	–	4	–	0
Texas		–		5	–	4	–	0
VPI		–		5	–	4	–	0
Arkansas State Normal		–		3	–	3	–	0
Chattanooga		–		4	–	4	–	0
North Carolina		–		3	–	3	–	3
Oklahoma A&M		–		4	–	4	–	0
Delaware		–		3	–	4	–	1
Kendall		–		2	–	3	–	0
South Carolina		–		3	–	5	–	1
Texas A&M		–		3	–	5	–	0
Georgetown		–		2	–	4	–	1
Howard (AL)		–		2	–	4	–	0
Maryland		–		3	–	8	–	0
Birmingham		–		0	–	3	–	3
Stetson		–		0	–	1	–	1
Wake Forest		–		1	–	4	–	0
Goldey College		–		0	–	2	–	1
Mississippi College		–		0	–	1	–	0
Southwest Texas State		–		0	–	2	–	0
Marshall		–		0	–	6	–	0

The 1908 Georgetown Blue and Gray football team represented Georgetown University during the 1908 college football season. Led by William Newman in his first year as head coach, the team went 2–4–1.

== Schedule ==
Date	Opponent	Site	Result	Attendance	Source
October 3	Gallaudet	Georgetown Field; Washington, DC	W 15–0		
October 10	Baltimore Medical	Georgetown Field; Washington, DC	W 22–4		
October 17	at North Carolina A&M	Riddick Stadium; Raleigh, NC	L 0–5	5,000	
October 26	North Carolina	Georgetown Field; Washington, DC	T 6–6		
November 3	Fordham	American League Park; New York, NY	L 0–22	3,000	
November 14	Virginia	Georgetown Field; Washington, DC	L 0–6		
November 26	Washington and Lee	Georgetown Field; Washington, DC	L 11–12		
