= 1908 VPI football team =

American college football season

1908 VPI football
- Conference: Independent
- Record: 5–4
- Head coach: R. M. Brown (1st season)
- Captain: Joseph Talmage Luttrell
- Home stadium: Gibboney Field

1908 Southern college football independents records
	Conf.			Overall
Team	W	L	T	W		L		T
Southwestern Louisiana Industrial		–		6	–	0	–	0
Virginia		–		7	–	0	–	1
Rollins		–		4	–	0	–	1
George Washington		–		8	–	1	–	1
Oklahoma		–		8	–	1	–	1
Tulane		–		7	–	1	–	0
North Carolina A&M		–		6	–	1	–	0
The Citadel		–		4	–	1	–	1
Navy		–		9	–	2	–	1
Florida		–		5	–	2	–	1
TCU		–		6	–	3	–	0
VMI		–		4	–	2	–	0
Davidson		–		5	–	3	–	1
Baylor		–		5	–	3	–	0
West Virginia		–		5	–	3	–	0
Kentucky State		–		4	–	3	–	0
Louisiana Industrial		–		4	–	3	–	1
Arkansas		–		5	–	4	–	0
Texas		–		5	–	4	–	0
VPI		–		5	–	4	–	0
Arkansas State Normal		–		3	–	3	–	0
Chattanooga		–		4	–	4	–	0
North Carolina		–		3	–	3	–	3
Oklahoma A&M		–		4	–	4	–	0
Delaware		–		3	–	4	–	1
Kendall		–		2	–	3	–	0
South Carolina		–		3	–	5	–	1
Texas A&M		–		3	–	5	–	0
Georgetown		–		2	–	4	–	1
Howard (AL)		–		2	–	4	–	0
Maryland		–		3	–	8	–	0
Birmingham		–		0	–	3	–	3
Stetson		–		0	–	1	–	1
Wake Forest		–		1	–	4	–	0
Goldey College		–		0	–	2	–	1
Mississippi College		–		0	–	1	–	0
Southwest Texas State		–		0	–	2	–	0
Marshall		–		0	–	6	–	0

The 1908 VPI football team represented Virginia Agricultural and Mechanical College and Polytechnic Institute in the 1908 college football season. The team was led by their head coach R. M. Brown and finished with a record of five wins and four losses (5–4).

== Schedule ==
Date	Time	Opponent	Site	Result	Attendance	Source
October 3		Hampden–Sydney	Gibboney Field; Blacksburg, VA	W 50–0		
October 10		at Clemson	Bowman Field; Calhoun, SC	W 6–0		
October 17	3:00 p.m.	at Princeton	University Field; Princeton, NJ	L 4–10	3,000	
October 24	3:30 p.m.	vs. VMI	Roanoke, VA (rivalry)	W 10–0		
October 31		vs. Washington and Lee	Lynchburg, VA	W 15–4	5,000	
November 7	3:30 p.m.	vs. North Carolina	Broad Street Park; Richmond, VA	W 10–0	2,000	
November 14	4:45 p.m.	George Washington	Gibboney Field; Blacksburg, VA	L 0–6		
November 21		at Navy	Worden Field; Annapolis, MD	L 4–15		
November 26	3:00 p.m.	vs. North Carolina A&M	Lafayette Field; Norfolk, VA	L 5–6	5,000	

== Before the season ==
The 1907 VPI football team compiled a 7–2 record and were led by Bob Williams in his only season as head coach.

== Game summaries ==
=== Hampden–Sydney ===
VPI's first game of the season was a victory over Hampden–Sydney at Gibboney Field.

The starting lineup for VPI was: Huffard (left end), H. Jones (left tackle), Campbell (left guard), Gibbs (center), H. Hodgson (right guard), J. Jones (right tackle), Hicks (right end), Connolly (quarterback), St. Clair (left halfback), Billups (right halfback), V. Hodgson (fullback).

The starting lineup for Hampden–Sydney was: Henry Bishof (left end), S. L. Graham (left tackle), Willoughby Hundley (left guard), Burleigh Mears (center), Lemuel Bowden (right guard), Fred Valentine (right tackle), Merriman Smith (right end), Howson Blanton (quarterback), B. W. Blanton (left halfback), Paul Yeager (right halfback), George Bowers (fullback).

=== Clemson ===
VPI at Clemson

Team	1	2	Total
• VPI	6	0	6
Clemson	0	0	0

- Date: October 10, 1908
- Location: Bowman Field
  Calhoun, SC
- Referee: Bowcock (Georgetown)

After their victory over Hampden–Sydney, VPI played Clemson Agricultural College at Bowman Field in Calhoun, South Carolina.

The starting lineup for VPI was: Huffard (left end), H. Jones (left tackle), Campbell (left guard), Gibbs (center), H. Hodgson (right guard), J. Jones (right tackle), Hicks (right end), Connolly (quarterback), Luttrell (left halfback), Billups (right halfback), V. Hodgson (fullback).

The starting lineup for Clemson was: T. E. Horton (left end), F. V. Gilmer (left tackle), Frank Fleming (left guard), J. T. Cochran (center), Onan Hydrick (right guard), William Odom (right tackle), Walter White (right end), Stricker Coles (quarterback), R. D. McFadden (left halfback), C. F. Lokey (right halfback), Charles Robbs (fullback).

=== Princeton ===
VPI at Princeton

Team	1	2	Total
VPI	4	0	4
• Princeton	0	10	10

- Date: October 17, 1908
- Location: University Field
  Princeton, NJ
- Game start: 3:00 p.m.
- Game attendance: 3,000
- Game weather: "sunny"
- Referee: Samuel B. Newton

The starting lineup for VPI was: Huffard (left end), H. Jones (left tackle), Walker (left guard), Gibbs (center), H. Hodgson (right guard), J. Jones (right tackle), Hicks (right end), Connolly (quarterback), Luttrell (left halfback), Billups (right halfback), V. Hodgson (fullback).

The starting lineup for Princeton was: Harry G. Buckingham (left end), Rudolph Siegling (left tackle), P. E. Waller (left guard), N. R. Cass (center), D. M. MacFayden (right guard), F. C. Bamman (right tackle), T. H. Welch (right end), R. E. Bard (quarterback), F. B. Read (left halfback), C. S. Coxe (right halfback), V. S. Merle-Smith (fullback). The substitutes were: Frank Bergin, H. W. Bishop, A. B. Clark, Logan Cunningham, Fred Dawson, E. C. Feigenspann, H. E. Gill, P. M. King, T. N. Pfeiffer, W. R. Sparks, Frederick Tibbott, J. Waller and F. M. Whaley.

=== VMI ===
VMI vs. VPI

Team	1	2	Total
VMI	0	0	0
• VPI	10	0	10

- Date: October 24, 1908
- Location: Roanoke, VA
- Game start: 3:30 p.m.
- Referee: Williams (UVA)

The starting lineup for VPI was: Huffard (left end), H. Jones (left tackle), Walker (left guard), Gibbs (center), H. Hodgson (right guard), J. Jones (right tackle), Hicks (right end), Connolly (quarterback), Luttrell (left halfback), Billups (right halfback), V. Hodgson (fullback).

The starting lineup for VMI was: William Poague (left end), George Alexander (left tackle), John Minton (left guard), Harry Dashiell (center), Richard Clemmer (right guard), H. Pattison (right tackle), Henry Poague (right end), Donald McMillen (quarterback), G. Cook Ferebee (left halfback), Porter (right halfback), George MacLean (fullback). The substitutes were: R. DeVant, Paul English, Herbert Kinsolving and Thomas Scott.

=== Washington and Lee ===
Washington & Lee vs. VPI

Team	1	2	Total
W&L	0	4	4
• VPI	15	0	15

- Date: October 31, 1908
- Location: Lynchburg, VA
- Game attendance: 5,000
- Referee: Jack Gass

The starting lineup for VPI was: Huffard (left end), H. Jones (left tackle), Walker (left guard), Gibbs (center), H. Hodgson (right guard), J. Jones (right tackle), Hicks (right end), A. Hodgson (quarterback), Luttrell (left halfback), Billups (right halfback), V. Hodgson (fullback). The substitutes were: Connolly and Gravely.

The starting lineup for Washington and Lee was: Carey (left end), Cleon Osbourn (left tackle), Richard Morales (left guard), William Pipes (center), Julian Pelter (right guard), Guyte McCord (right tackle), Henry Smartt (right end), W. H. Feuerstein (quarterback), John Izard (left halfback), W. C. Armentrout (right halfback), Edwin Alderson (fullback).

=== North Carolina ===
North Carolina vs. VPI

Team	1	2	Total
UNC	0	0	0
• VPI	0	10	10

- Date: November 7, 1908
- Location: Broad Street Park
  Richmond, VA
- Game start: 3:30 p.m.
- Game attendance: 2,000
- Referee: Jack Gass

The starting lineup for VPI was: Huffard (left end), H. Jones (left tackle), Walker (left guard), Gibbs (center), H. Hodgson (right guard), J. Jones (right tackle), Hicks (right end), Connolly (quarterback), Luttrell (left halfback), Billups (right halfback), V. Hodgson (fullback). The substitutes were: Davis.

The starting lineup for North Carolina was: James Wiggins (left end), Cecil Garrett (left tackle), George Rodgers (left guard), Archie Deans (center), Robert Howell (right guard), Eston Norwood (right tackle), John Manning (right end), John Tillett (quarterback), Colin Ruffin (left halfback), William Thomas (right halfback), Louis Belden (fullback). The substitutes were: William Lester and Daniel Williams.

=== Navy ===
VPI at Navy

Team	1	2	Total
VPI	4	0	4
• Navy	11	4	15

- Date: November 21, 1908
- Location: Worden Field
  Annapolis, MD
- Referee: George Washington Woodruff

The starting lineup for VPI was: Huffard (left end), H. Jones (left tackle), Walker (left guard), Gibbs (center), H. Hodgson (right guard), Smith (right tackle), Hicks (right end), Connolly (quarterback), Luttrell (left halfback), Davis (right halfback), V. Hodgson (fullback). The substitutes were: J. Jones.

The starting lineup for Navy was: Raymond Jones (left end), Percy Northcroft (left tackle), George Meyer (left guard), Charles Brand (center), Percy Wright (right guard), Frank Leighton (right tackle), Davis (right end), Ed Lange (quarterback), John Dalton (left halfback), Henry Clay (right halfback), W. A. Richardson (fullback). The substitutes were: Anderson, Lee Carey, Calvin Cobb, Dixon, Robert Elmer, Grafton, Hibbard, T. Starr King, Elmer Niles, Frederick Reinicke, Ingram C. Sowell and Stewart.

=== North Carolina A&M ===
North Carolina A&M vs. VPI

Team	1	2	Total
• NC A&M	0	6	6
VPI	0	5	5

- Date: November 26, 1908
- Location: Lafayette Field
  Norfolk, VA
- Game start: 3:00 p.m.
- Game attendance: 5,000
- Referee: V. C. Chase (Michigan)

The starting lineup for VPI was: Huffard (left end), H. Jones (left tackle), Walker (left guard), Gibbs (center), H. Hodgson (right guard), Smith (right tackle), Hicks (right end), Connolly (quarterback), Luttrell (left halfback), Billups (right halfback), V. Hodgson (fullback). The substitutes were: Davis, Jones, Legge and Norris.

The starting lineup for North Carolina A&M was: Harry Hartsell (left end), J. L. Von Glahn (left tackle), James Dunn (left guard), John Bray (center), E. C. Gattis (right guard), J. B. Ross (right tackle), James Sadler (right end), Samuel Stephens (quarterback), J. W. Sexton (left halfback), Frank Thompson (right halfback), J. S. Stroud (fullback). The substitutes were: Joseph Davidson, D. B. Floyd, William Johnson, Harry Mott, David Seifert, S. A. Spencer, Joseph Whitehurst and Wilson.

== Players ==
The following players were members of the 1908 football team according to the roster published in the 1909 edition of The Bugle, the Virginia Tech yearbook.

VPI 1908 roster
Quarterback: Frederick William Connolly; Guards: Hoss Hodgson; Walker; Tackles: Harry Guilford Jones; John Porter Jones; Center: Aubrey Gravatt Gibbs	Ends: Thomas Paret Hicks; Paul Phillippi Huffard; Halfbacks: Henry Evans Billups; Joseph Talmage Luttrell (Capt.); Fullback: Vivian Burnett Hodgson	Substitutes: Campbell; Winston Bozel Davis; William Seymour Gravely; Asbury Nathaniel Hodgson; Frederick Hughes Legge; Edward Raymond Norris

== Coaching and training staff ==
- Head coach: R. M. Brown
- Manager: Henry Hoge Hutchinson
- Assistant manager: Frank Curtis Stoneburner
