= 1908 Delaware football team =

American college football season

1908 Delaware football
- Conference: Independent
- Record: 3–4–1
- Head coach: William McAvoy (1st season)

1908 Southern college football independents records
	Conf.			Overall
Team	W	L	T	W		L		T
Southwestern Louisiana Industrial		–		6	–	0	–	0
Virginia		–		7	–	0	–	1
Rollins		–		4	–	0	–	1
George Washington		–		8	–	1	–	1
Oklahoma		–		8	–	1	–	1
Tulane		–		7	–	1	–	0
North Carolina A&M		–		6	–	1	–	0
The Citadel		–		4	–	1	–	1
Navy		–		9	–	2	–	1
Florida		–		5	–	2	–	1
TCU		–		6	–	3	–	0
VMI		–		4	–	2	–	0
Davidson		–		5	–	3	–	1
Baylor		–		5	–	3	–	0
West Virginia		–		5	–	3	–	0
Kentucky State		–		4	–	3	–	0
Louisiana Industrial		–		4	–	3	–	1
Arkansas		–		5	–	4	–	0
Texas		–		5	–	4	–	0
VPI		–		5	–	4	–	0
Arkansas State Normal		–		3	–	3	–	0
Chattanooga		–		4	–	4	–	0
North Carolina		–		3	–	3	–	3
Oklahoma A&M		–		4	–	4	–	0
Delaware		–		3	–	4	–	1
Kendall		–		2	–	3	–	0
South Carolina		–		3	–	5	–	1
Texas A&M		–		3	–	5	–	0
Georgetown		–		2	–	4	–	1
Howard (AL)		–		2	–	4	–	0
Maryland		–		3	–	8	–	0
Birmingham		–		0	–	3	–	3
Stetson		–		0	–	1	–	1
Wake Forest		–		1	–	4	–	0
Goldey College		–		0	–	2	–	1
Mississippi College		–		0	–	1	–	0
Southwest Texas State		–		0	–	2	–	0
Marshall		–		0	–	6	–	0

The 1908 Delaware football team was an American football team that represented Delaware College (later renamed the University of Delaware) as an independent during the 1908 college football season. In its first year under head coach William McAvoy, the team compiled a 3–4–1 record.

== Schedule ==
Date	Opponent	Site	Result	Source
October 3	Williamson	Newark, DE	L 0–6	
October 10	at Haverford	Haverford, PA	L 0–11	
October 17	at Bucknell	Lewisburg, PA	L 0–13	
October 31	Washington College	Newark, DE	W 12–0	
November 7	at Rutgers	New Brunswick, NJ	T 6–6	
November 14	at Johns Hopkins	Baltimore, MD	W 9–0	
November 21	Franklin & Marshall	Newark, DE	W 15–0	
November 26	at Western Maryland	Westminster, MD	L 4–15	
