= 1908 Southwest Texas State football team =

American college football season

1908 Southwest Texas State football
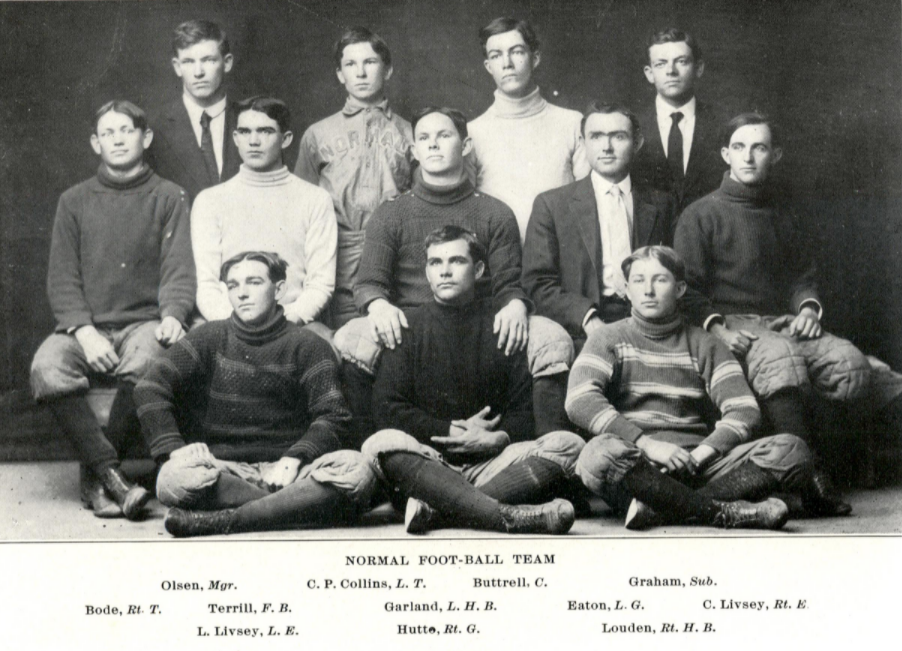
- Conference: Independent
- Record: 0–2
- Head coach: None

1908 Southern college football independents records
	Conf.			Overall
Team	W	L	T	W		L		T
Southwestern Louisiana Industrial		–		6	–	0	–	0
Virginia		–		7	–	0	–	1
Rollins		–		4	–	0	–	1
George Washington		–		8	–	1	–	1
Oklahoma		–		8	–	1	–	1
Tulane		–		7	–	1	–	0
North Carolina A&M		–		6	–	1	–	0
The Citadel		–		4	–	1	–	1
Navy		–		9	–	2	–	1
Florida		–		5	–	2	–	1
TCU		–		6	–	3	–	0
VMI		–		4	–	2	–	0
Davidson		–		5	–	3	–	1
Baylor		–		5	–	3	–	0
West Virginia		–		5	–	3	–	0
Kentucky State		–		4	–	3	–	0
Louisiana Industrial		–		4	–	3	–	1
Arkansas		–		5	–	4	–	0
Texas		–		5	–	4	–	0
VPI		–		5	–	4	–	0
Arkansas State Normal		–		3	–	3	–	0
Chattanooga		–		4	–	4	–	0
North Carolina		–		3	–	3	–	3
Oklahoma A&M		–		4	–	4	–	0
Delaware		–		3	–	4	–	1
Kendall		–		2	–	3	–	0
South Carolina		–		3	–	5	–	1
Texas A&M		–		3	–	5	–	0
Georgetown		–		2	–	4	–	1
Howard (AL)		–		2	–	4	–	0
Maryland		–		3	–	8	–	0
Birmingham		–		0	–	3	–	3
Stetson		–		0	–	1	–	1
Wake Forest		–		1	–	4	–	0
Goldey College		–		0	–	2	–	1
Mississippi College		–		0	–	1	–	0
Southwest Texas State		–		0	–	2	–	0
Marshall		–		0	–	6	–	0

The 1908 Southwest Texas State football team was an American football team that represented Southwest Texas State Normal School—now known cas Texas State University–as an independent during the 1908 college football season. The team had no head coach and finished the season with a record of 0–2.

== Schedule ==
Date	Opponent	Site	Result	Source
November 16	at San Marcos Baptist Academy (second team)	Academy athletic grounds; San Marcos, TX	L 0–5	
	Coronal Institute		L	

== Personnel ==
- Bailiff
- Barrow
- Bode, right tackle
- Buttrell, center
- Collins, left tackle
- Cowan, captain
- Tip Eaton, left guard
- Garland, left halfback
- Graham, substitute
- Hutto, right guard
- Chalmers Livsey, right end
- L. Livsey, left end
- Louden, right halfback
- Raborn
- Terrill, fullback
- Tinsey
- Olsen, manager
