= 1908 Virginia Orange and Blue football team =

American college football season

1908 Virginia Orange and Blue football

Southern co-champion
- Conference: Independent
- Record: 7–0–1
- Head coach: Merritt Cooke Jr. (1st season)
- Captain: William C. Gloth
- Home stadium: Madison Hall Field

1908 Southern college football independents records
	Conf.			Overall
Team	W	L	T	W		L		T
Southwestern Louisiana Industrial		–		6	–	0	–	0
Virginia		–		7	–	0	–	1
Rollins		–		4	–	0	–	1
George Washington		–		8	–	1	–	1
Oklahoma		–		8	–	1	–	1
Tulane		–		7	–	1	–	0
North Carolina A&M		–		6	–	1	–	0
The Citadel		–		4	–	1	–	1
Navy		–		9	–	2	–	1
Florida		–		5	–	2	–	1
TCU		–		6	–	3	–	0
VMI		–		4	–	2	–	0
Davidson		–		5	–	3	–	1
Baylor		–		5	–	3	–	0
West Virginia		–		5	–	3	–	0
Kentucky State		–		4	–	3	–	0
Louisiana Industrial		–		4	–	3	–	1
Arkansas		–		5	–	4	–	0
Texas		–		5	–	4	–	0
VPI		–		5	–	4	–	0
Arkansas State Normal		–		3	–	3	–	0
Chattanooga		–		4	–	4	–	0
North Carolina		–		3	–	3	–	3
Oklahoma A&M		–		4	–	4	–	0
Delaware		–		3	–	4	–	1
Kendall		–		2	–	3	–	0
South Carolina		–		3	–	5	–	1
Texas A&M		–		3	–	5	–	0
Georgetown		–		2	–	4	–	1
Howard (AL)		–		2	–	4	–	0
Maryland		–		3	–	8	–	0
Birmingham		–		0	–	3	–	3
Stetson		–		0	–	1	–	1
Wake Forest		–		1	–	4	–	0
Goldey College		–		0	–	2	–	1
Mississippi College		–		0	–	1	–	0
Southwest Texas State		–		0	–	2	–	0
Marshall		–		0	–	6	–	0

The 1908 Virginia Orange and Blue football team represented the University of Virginia as an independent during the 1908 college football season. Led by Merritt Cooke Jr. in his first and only season as head coach, the Orange and Blue compiled a record of 7–0–1 and were one of two teams given the mythical title of Southern champion.

== Schedule ==
Date	Time	Opponent	Site	Result	Attendance	Source
September 26		William & Mary	Madison Hall Field; Charlottesville, VA	W 11–0		
September 30		St. John's (MD)	Madison Hall Field; Charlottesville, VA	W 18–9		
October 3		Randolph–Macon	Madison Hall Field; Charlottesville, VA	W 22–0		
October 9		Davidson	Madison Hall Field; Charlottesville, VA	W 12–0		
October 17	2:30 p.m.	vs. Sewanee	Lafayette Field; Norfolk, VA	T 0–0	5,000	
October 31	3:00 p.m.	vs. North Carolina A&M	Lafayette Field; Norfolk, VA	W 6–0	5,000	
November 14		at Georgetown	Georgetown Field; Washington, DC	W 6–0		
November 26		vs. North Carolina	Broad Street Park; Richmond, VA (South's Oldest Rivalry)	W 31–0	12,000	
