= 1908 Navy Midshipmen football team =

American college football season

1908 Navy Midshipmen football
- Conference: Independent
- Record: 9–2–1
- Head coach: Frank Berrien (1st season)
- Captain: Percy Northcroft
- Home stadium: Worden Field

1908 Southern college football independents records
	Conf.			Overall
Team	W	L	T	W		L		T
Southwestern Louisiana Industrial		–		6	–	0	–	0
Virginia		–		7	–	0	–	1
Rollins		–		4	–	0	–	1
George Washington		–		8	–	1	–	1
Oklahoma		–		8	–	1	–	1
Tulane		–		7	–	1	–	0
North Carolina A&M		–		6	–	1	–	0
The Citadel		–		4	–	1	–	1
Navy		–		9	–	2	–	1
Florida		–		5	–	2	–	1
TCU		–		6	–	3	–	0
VMI		–		4	–	2	–	0
Davidson		–		5	–	3	–	1
Baylor		–		5	–	3	–	0
West Virginia		–		5	–	3	–	0
Kentucky State		–		4	–	3	–	0
Louisiana Industrial		–		4	–	3	–	1
Arkansas		–		5	–	4	–	0
Texas		–		5	–	4	–	0
VPI		–		5	–	4	–	0
Arkansas State Normal		–		3	–	3	–	0
Chattanooga		–		4	–	4	–	0
North Carolina		–		3	–	3	–	3
Oklahoma A&M		–		4	–	4	–	0
Delaware		–		3	–	4	–	1
Kendall		–		2	–	3	–	0
South Carolina		–		3	–	5	–	1
Texas A&M		–		3	–	5	–	0
Georgetown		–		2	–	4	–	1
Howard (AL)		–		2	–	4	–	0
Maryland		–		3	–	8	–	0
Birmingham		–		0	–	3	–	3
Stetson		–		0	–	1	–	1
Wake Forest		–		1	–	4	–	0
Goldey College		–		0	–	2	–	1
Mississippi College		–		0	–	1	–	0
Southwest Texas State		–		0	–	2	–	0
Marshall		–		0	–	6	–	0

The 1908 Navy Midshipmen football team represented the United States Naval Academy during the 1908 college football season. In their first season under Frank Berrien, the Midshipmen compiled a 9–2–1 record, shut out seven opponents, and outscored all opponents by a combined score of 218 to 38.

== Schedule ==
Date	Opponent	Site	Result	Attendance	Source
October 3	Rutgers	Worden Field; Annapolis, MD	W 18–0		
October 4	St. John's (MD)	Worden Field; Annapolis, MD	W 22–0		
October 10	Dickinson	Worden Field; Annapolis, MD	W 22–0		
October 14	Maryland	Worden Field; Annapolis, MD (rivalry)	W 57–0		
October 17	Lehigh	Worden Field; Annapolis, MD	W 16–0		
October 24	Harvard	Worden Field; Annapolis, MD	T 6–6	8,000	
October 28	George Washington	Worden Field; Annapolis, MD	W 17–0		
October 31	Carlisle	Worden Field; Annapolis, MD	L 6–16		
November 7	Villanova	Worden Field; Annapolis, MD	W 30–6		
November 14	Penn State	Worden Field; Annapolis, MD	W 5–0		
November 21	VPI	Worden Field; Annapolis, MD	W 15–4		
November 28	vs. Army	Franklin Field; Philadelphia, PA (Army–Navy Game)	L 4–6		
