= 1908 South Carolina Gamecocks football team =

American college football season

1908 South Carolina Gamecocks football
- Conference: Independent
- Record: 3–5–1
- Head coach: Christie Benet (3rd season)
- Captain: R. E. Gonzales
- Home stadium: Davis Field

1908 Southern college football independents records
	Conf.			Overall
Team	W	L	T	W		L		T
Southwestern Louisiana Industrial		–		6	–	0	–	0
Virginia		–		7	–	0	–	1
Rollins		–		4	–	0	–	1
George Washington		–		8	–	1	–	1
Oklahoma		–		8	–	1	–	1
Tulane		–		7	–	1	–	0
North Carolina A&M		–		6	–	1	–	0
The Citadel		–		4	–	1	–	1
Navy		–		9	–	2	–	1
Florida		–		5	–	2	–	1
TCU		–		6	–	3	–	0
VMI		–		4	–	2	–	0
Davidson		–		5	–	3	–	1
Baylor		–		5	–	3	–	0
West Virginia		–		5	–	3	–	0
Kentucky State		–		4	–	3	–	0
Louisiana Industrial		–		4	–	3	–	1
Arkansas		–		5	–	4	–	0
Texas		–		5	–	4	–	0
VPI		–		5	–	4	–	0
Arkansas State Normal		–		3	–	3	–	0
Chattanooga		–		4	–	4	–	0
North Carolina		–		3	–	3	–	3
Oklahoma A&M		–		4	–	4	–	0
Delaware		–		3	–	4	–	1
Kendall		–		2	–	3	–	0
South Carolina		–		3	–	5	–	1
Texas A&M		–		3	–	5	–	0
Georgetown		–		2	–	4	–	1
Howard (AL)		–		2	–	4	–	0
Maryland		–		3	–	8	–	0
Birmingham		–		0	–	3	–	3
Stetson		–		0	–	1	–	1
Wake Forest		–		1	–	4	–	0
Goldey College		–		0	–	2	–	1
Mississippi College		–		0	–	1	–	0
Southwest Texas State		–		0	–	2	–	0
Marshall		–		0	–	6	–	0

The 1908 South Carolina Gamecocks football team represented the University of South Carolina as an independent during the 1908 college football season. Led by third-year head coach Christie Benet, South Carolina compiled a record of 3–5–1.

== Schedule ==
Date	Opponent	Site	Result	Source
October 3	Ridgewood A.C.	Davis Field; Columbia, SC	T 0–0	
October 10	College of Charleston	Davis Field; Columbia, SC	W 17–0	
October 17	at Georgia	Herty Field; Athens, GA	L 6–29	
October 22	Charleston A.A.	Davis Field; Columbia, SC	L 4–15	
October 29	Davidson	Fairgrounds; Columbia, SC	L 0–22	
November 4	at Medical College of Georgia	Warren Field; Augusta, GA	W 19–5	
November 7	Bingham School	Davis Field; Columbia, SC	L 6–10	
November 14	at North Carolina	Chapel Hill, NC	L 0–22	
November 26	at The Citadel	Charleston, SC	W 12–0	
