= 1908 North Carolina A&M Aggies football team =

American college football season

1908 North Carolina A&M Aggies football
- Conference: Independent
- Record: 6–1
- Head coach: Mickey Whitehurst (2nd season)
- Home stadium: Riddick Stadium

1908 Southern college football independents records
| | Conf. | | | Overall |
| Team | W | L | T | W | | L | | T |
|---|---|---|---|---|---|---|---|---|
| Southwestern Louisiana Industrial | | – | | 6 | – | 0 | – | 0 |
| Virginia | | – | | 7 | – | 0 | – | 1 |
| Rollins | | – | | 4 | – | 0 | – | 1 |
| George Washington | | – | | 8 | – | 1 | – | 1 |
| Oklahoma | | – | | 8 | – | 1 | – | 1 |
| Tulane | | – | | 7 | – | 1 | – | 0 |
| North Carolina A&M | | – | | 6 | – | 1 | – | 0 |
| The Citadel | | – | | 4 | – | 1 | – | 1 |
| Navy | | – | | 9 | – | 2 | – | 1 |
| Florida | | – | | 5 | – | 2 | – | 1 |
| TCU | | – | | 6 | – | 3 | – | 0 |
| VMI | | – | | 4 | – | 2 | – | 0 |
| Davidson | | – | | 5 | – | 3 | – | 1 |
| Baylor | | – | | 5 | – | 3 | – | 0 |
| West Virginia | | – | | 5 | – | 3 | – | 0 |
| Kentucky State | | – | | 4 | – | 3 | – | 0 |
| Louisiana Industrial | | – | | 4 | – | 3 | – | 1 |
| Arkansas | | – | | 5 | – | 4 | – | 0 |
| Texas | | – | | 5 | – | 4 | – | 0 |
| VPI | | – | | 5 | – | 4 | – | 0 |
| Arkansas State Normal | | – | | 3 | – | 3 | – | 0 |
| Chattanooga | | – | | 4 | – | 4 | – | 0 |
| North Carolina | | – | | 3 | – | 3 | – | 3 |
| Oklahoma A&M | | – | | 4 | – | 4 | – | 0 |
| Delaware | | – | | 3 | – | 4 | – | 1 |
| Kendall | | – | | 2 | – | 3 | – | 0 |
| South Carolina | | – | | 3 | – | 5 | – | 1 |
| Texas A&M | | – | | 3 | – | 5 | – | 0 |
| Georgetown | | – | | 2 | – | 4 | – | 1 |
| Howard (AL) | | – | | 2 | – | 4 | – | 0 |
| Maryland | | – | | 3 | – | 8 | – | 0 |
| Birmingham | | – | | 0 | – | 3 | – | 3 |
| Stetson | | – | | 0 | – | 1 | – | 1 |
| Wake Forest | | – | | 1 | – | 4 | – | 0 |
| Goldey College | | – | | 0 | – | 2 | – | 1 |
| Mississippi College | | – | | 0 | – | 1 | – | 0 |
| Southwest Texas State | | – | | 0 | – | 2 | – | 0 |
| Marshall | | – | | 0 | – | 6 | – | 0 |

The 1908 North Carolina A&M Aggies football team represented the North Carolina College of Agriculture and Mechanic Arts—now known as North Carolina State University—as an independent during the 1908 college football season. Led by second-year head coach Mickey Whitehurst, the Aggies compiled a record of 6–1.

== Schedule ==
| Date | Time | Opponent | Site | Result | Attendance | Source |
|---|---|---|---|---|---|---|
| October 3 | | at Wake Forest | Wake Forest, NC (rivalry) | W 25–0 | | |
| October 12 | | William & Mary | Riddick Stadium; Raleigh, NC | W 24–0 | | |
| October 15 | | Georgetown | Riddick Stadium; Raleigh, NC | W 5–0 | 5,000 | |
| October 31 | 3:00 p.m. | vs. Virginia | Lafayette Field; Norfolk, VA | L 0–6 | 5,000 | |
| November 7 | | vs. Davidson | Latta Park; Charlotte, NC | W 21–0 | 1,500 | |
| November 21 | | Wake Forest | Riddick Stadium; Raleigh, NC | W 76–0 | 500 | |
| November 26 | 3:00 p.m. | vs. VPI | Lafayette Field; Norfolk, VA | W 6–5 | 5,000 | |
All times are in Eastern time
