= 1908 Arkansas State Normal football team =

American college football season

1908 Arkansas State Normal football
- Conference: Independent
- Record: 3–3
- Head coach: Oscar D. Longstreth (1st season)

1908 Southern college football independents records
	Conf.			Overall
Team	W	L	T	W		L		T
Southwestern Louisiana Industrial		–		6	–	0	–	0
Virginia		–		7	–	0	–	1
Rollins		–		4	–	0	–	1
George Washington		–		8	–	1	–	1
Oklahoma		–		8	–	1	–	1
Tulane		–		7	–	1	–	0
North Carolina A&M		–		6	–	1	–	0
The Citadel		–		4	–	1	–	1
Navy		–		9	–	2	–	1
Florida		–		5	–	2	–	1
TCU		–		6	–	3	–	0
VMI		–		4	–	2	–	0
Davidson		–		5	–	3	–	1
Baylor		–		5	–	3	–	0
West Virginia		–		5	–	3	–	0
Kentucky State		–		4	–	3	–	0
Louisiana Industrial		–		4	–	3	–	1
Arkansas		–		5	–	4	–	0
Texas		–		5	–	4	–	0
VPI		–		5	–	4	–	0
Arkansas State Normal		–		3	–	3	–	0
Chattanooga		–		4	–	4	–	0
North Carolina		–		3	–	3	–	3
Oklahoma A&M		–		4	–	4	–	0
Delaware		–		3	–	4	–	1
Kendall		–		2	–	3	–	0
South Carolina		–		3	–	5	–	1
Texas A&M		–		3	–	5	–	0
Georgetown		–		2	–	4	–	1
Howard (AL)		–		2	–	4	–	0
Maryland		–		3	–	8	–	0
Birmingham		–		0	–	3	–	3
Stetson		–		0	–	1	–	1
Wake Forest		–		1	–	4	–	0
Goldey College		–		0	–	2	–	1
Mississippi College		–		0	–	1	–	0
Southwest Texas State		–		0	–	2	–	0
Marshall		–		0	–	6	–	0

The 1908 Arkansas State Normal football team represented Arkansas State Normal School—now known as the University of Central Arkansas—in the 1908 college football season. In their first year fielding a football team, under head coach Oscar D. Longstreth in his first collegiate coaching position, Arkansas State Normal compiled a 3–3 record against a variety of local, high school, and college teams, and outscored their opponents by a total of 63 to 61.

== Schedule ==
Date	Opponent	Site	Result
October 10	Little Rock High School	Little Rock, AR	L 0–22
October 24	Arkansas School of Medicine	Conway, AR	W 5–0
October 31	Ozarks	Clarksville, AR	L 0–11
November 7	Little Rock College	Conway, AR	W 15–6
November 14	Atkins High School	Conway, AR	W 32–0
November 27	Hendrix	Conway, AR	L 11–22
