= 1908 Maryland Aggies football team =

American college football season

1908 Maryland Aggies football
- Conference: Independent
- Record: 3–8
- Head coach: William Lang (1st season)

1908 Southern college football independents records
	Conf.			Overall
Team	W	L	T	W		L		T
Southwestern Louisiana Industrial		–		6	–	0	–	0
Virginia		–		7	–	0	–	1
Rollins		–		4	–	0	–	1
George Washington		–		8	–	1	–	1
Oklahoma		–		8	–	1	–	1
Tulane		–		7	–	1	–	0
North Carolina A&M		–		6	–	1	–	0
The Citadel		–		4	–	1	–	1
Navy		–		9	–	2	–	1
Florida		–		5	–	2	–	1
TCU		–		6	–	3	–	0
VMI		–		4	–	2	–	0
Davidson		–		5	–	3	–	1
Baylor		–		5	–	3	–	0
West Virginia		–		5	–	3	–	0
Kentucky State		–		4	–	3	–	0
Louisiana Industrial		–		4	–	3	–	1
Arkansas		–		5	–	4	–	0
Texas		–		5	–	4	–	0
VPI		–		5	–	4	–	0
Arkansas State Normal		–		3	–	3	–	0
Chattanooga		–		4	–	4	–	0
North Carolina		–		3	–	3	–	3
Oklahoma A&M		–		4	–	4	–	0
Delaware		–		3	–	4	–	1
Kendall		–		2	–	3	–	0
South Carolina		–		3	–	5	–	1
Texas A&M		–		3	–	5	–	0
Georgetown		–		2	–	4	–	1
Howard (AL)		–		2	–	4	–	0
Maryland		–		3	–	8	–	0
Birmingham		–		0	–	3	–	3
Stetson		–		0	–	1	–	1
Wake Forest		–		1	–	4	–	0
Goldey College		–		0	–	2	–	1
Mississippi College		–		0	–	1	–	0
Southwest Texas State		–		0	–	2	–	0
Marshall		–		0	–	6	–	0

The 1908 Maryland Aggies football team represented Maryland Agricultural College (later part of the University of Maryland) in the 1908 college football season. The Aggies compiled a 3–8 record, were shut out by seven of eleven opponents, and were outscored by all opponents, 204 to 27. William Lang was the team's coach.

== Schedule ==
Date	Opponent	Site	Result	Source
September 30	Washington Central High School	College Park, MD	W 5–0	
October 3	at Richmond	Broad Street Park; Richmond, VA	L 0–22	
October 7	Washington Technical High School	College Park, MD	L 5–6	
October 10	at Johns Hopkins	Homewood Field; Baltimore, MD	L 0–10	
October 14	at Navy	Worden Field; Annapolis, MD	L 0–57	
October 17	Gallaudet	College Park, MD	W 5–0	
October 24	at George Washington	American League Park; Washington, DC	L 0–57	
October 31	Fredericksburg College	College Park, MD	L 0–10	
November 7	Baltimore Polytechnic Institute	College Park, MD	W 12–5	
November 14	at St. John's (MD)	Annapolis, MD	L 0–31	
November 21	Washington College	College Park, MD	L 0–11	
