= 1908 Marshall Thundering Herd football team =

American college football season

1908 Marshall Thundering Herd football
- Conference: Independent
- Record: 0–6
- Head coach: William G. Vinal (1st season)
- Captain: Archibald McQueen
- Home stadium: Central Field

1908 Southern college football independents records
	Conf.			Overall
Team	W	L	T	W		L		T
Southwestern Louisiana Industrial		–		6	–	0	–	0
Virginia		–		7	–	0	–	1
Rollins		–		4	–	0	–	1
George Washington		–		8	–	1	–	1
Oklahoma		–		8	–	1	–	1
Tulane		–		7	–	1	–	0
North Carolina A&M		–		6	–	1	–	0
The Citadel		–		4	–	1	–	1
Navy		–		9	–	2	–	1
Florida		–		5	–	2	–	1
TCU		–		6	–	3	–	0
VMI		–		4	–	2	–	0
Davidson		–		5	–	3	–	1
Baylor		–		5	–	3	–	0
West Virginia		–		5	–	3	–	0
Kentucky State		–		4	–	3	–	0
Louisiana Industrial		–		4	–	3	–	1
Arkansas		–		5	–	4	–	0
Texas		–		5	–	4	–	0
VPI		–		5	–	4	–	0
Arkansas State Normal		–		3	–	3	–	0
Chattanooga		–		4	–	4	–	0
North Carolina		–		3	–	3	–	3
Oklahoma A&M		–		4	–	4	–	0
Delaware		–		3	–	4	–	1
Kendall		–		2	–	3	–	0
South Carolina		–		3	–	5	–	1
Texas A&M		–		3	–	5	–	0
Georgetown		–		2	–	4	–	1
Howard (AL)		–		2	–	4	–	0
Maryland		–		3	–	8	–	0
Birmingham		–		0	–	3	–	3
Stetson		–		0	–	1	–	1
Wake Forest		–		1	–	4	–	0
Goldey College		–		0	–	2	–	1
Mississippi College		–		0	–	1	–	0
Southwest Texas State		–		0	–	2	–	0
Marshall		–		0	–	6	–	0

The 1908 Marshall Thundering Herd football team represented Marshall College (now Marshall University) as an independent during the 1908 college football season. Marshall posted a winless 0–6 record, being outscored by its opposition 14–104. Home games were played on a campus field called "Central Field" which is presently Campus Commons.

== Schedule ==
Date	Opponent	Site	Result
October 3	at Ohio	Athens, OH	L 0–59
October 10	Charleston YMCA	Central Field; Huntington, WV	L 4–6
October 17	at Charleston YMCA	Charleston, WV	L 0–12
October 24	Ashland YMCA	Central Field; Huntington, WV	L 5–6
November 7	at Morris Harvey	Charleston, WV	L 0–10
November 28	Morris Harvey^{†}	Central Field; Huntington, WV	L 5–11
^{†}Homecoming
