= 1908 Arkansas Razorbacks football team =

American college football season

1908 Arkansas Razorbacks football
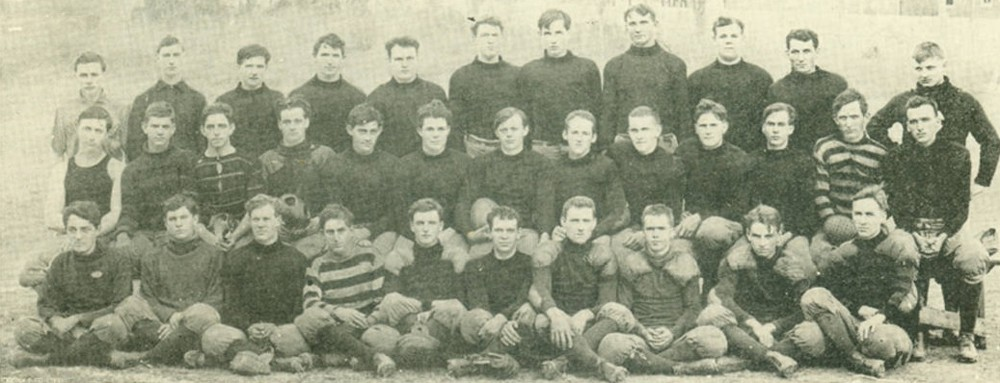
- Conference: Independent
- Record: 5–4
- Head coach: Hugo Bezdek (1st season)
- Captain: Willis Nelson
- Home stadium: The Hill

1908 Southern college football independents records
	Conf.			Overall
Team	W	L	T	W		L		T
Southwestern Louisiana Industrial		–		6	–	0	–	0
Virginia		–		7	–	0	–	1
Rollins		–		4	–	0	–	1
George Washington		–		8	–	1	–	1
Oklahoma		–		8	–	1	–	1
Tulane		–		7	–	1	–	0
North Carolina A&M		–		6	–	1	–	0
The Citadel		–		4	–	1	–	1
Navy		–		9	–	2	–	1
Florida		–		5	–	2	–	1
TCU		–		6	–	3	–	0
VMI		–		4	–	2	–	0
Davidson		–		5	–	3	–	1
Baylor		–		5	–	3	–	0
West Virginia		–		5	–	3	–	0
Kentucky State		–		4	–	3	–	0
Louisiana Industrial		–		4	–	3	–	1
Arkansas		–		5	–	4	–	0
Texas		–		5	–	4	–	0
VPI		–		5	–	4	–	0
Arkansas State Normal		–		3	–	3	–	0
Chattanooga		–		4	–	4	–	0
North Carolina		–		3	–	3	–	3
Oklahoma A&M		–		4	–	4	–	0
Delaware		–		3	–	4	–	1
Kendall		–		2	–	3	–	0
South Carolina		–		3	–	5	–	1
Texas A&M		–		3	–	5	–	0
Georgetown		–		2	–	4	–	1
Howard (AL)		–		2	–	4	–	0
Maryland		–		3	–	8	–	0
Birmingham		–		0	–	3	–	3
Stetson		–		0	–	1	–	1
Wake Forest		–		1	–	4	–	0
Goldey College		–		0	–	2	–	1
Mississippi College		–		0	–	1	–	0
Southwest Texas State		–		0	–	2	–	0
Marshall		–		0	–	6	–	0

The 1908 Arkansas Razorbacks football team represented the University of Arkansas during the 1908 college football season. The Razorbacks compiled a 5–4 record and outscored their opponents by a combined total of 214 to 120. In February 1908, Arkansas hired Hugo Bezdek, who had played at the fullback position for Amos Alonzo Stagg's Chicago Maroons football teams, as athletic director and football coach. The 1908 season was Bezdek's first at the helm of the Arkansas team.

== Schedule ==
Date	Time	Opponent	Site	Result	Attendance	Source
October 3		Haskell	The Hill; Fayetteville, AR	W 6–0		
October 10		Ole Miss	The Hill; Fayetteville, AR (rivalry)	W 33–0		
October 17		at Saint Louis	Sportsman's Park; St. Louis, MO	L 0–24		
October 24		Henderson	The Hill; Fayetteville, AR	W 51–0		
October 30	4:00 p.m.	at Oklahoma	Boyd Field; Norman, OK	L 5–27		
November 2		at Texas	Clark Field; Austin, TX (rivalry)	L 0–21		
November 14		Pittsburg Normal	The Hill; Fayetteville, AR	W 42–12		
November 21		Ouachita	The Hill; Fayetteville, AR	W 73–0		
November 26		LSU	West End Park; Little Rock, AR (rivalry)	L 4–36	5,000	
