= 1908 The Citadel Bulldogs football team =

American college football season

1908 The Citadel Bulldogs football
- Conference: Independent
- Record: 4–1–1
- Head coach: Ralph Foster (3rd season)
- Captain: Ed Smith
- Home stadium: Hampton Park

1908 Southern college football independents records
	Conf.			Overall
Team	W	L	T	W		L		T
Southwestern Louisiana Industrial		–		6	–	0	–	0
Virginia		–		7	–	0	–	1
Rollins		–		4	–	0	–	1
George Washington		–		8	–	1	–	1
Oklahoma		–		8	–	1	–	1
Tulane		–		7	–	1	–	0
North Carolina A&M		–		6	–	1	–	0
The Citadel		–		4	–	1	–	1
Navy		–		9	–	2	–	1
Florida		–		5	–	2	–	1
TCU		–		6	–	3	–	0
VMI		–		4	–	2	–	0
Davidson		–		5	–	3	–	1
Baylor		–		5	–	3	–	0
West Virginia		–		5	–	3	–	0
Kentucky State		–		4	–	3	–	0
Louisiana Industrial		–		4	–	3	–	1
Arkansas		–		5	–	4	–	0
Texas		–		5	–	4	–	0
VPI		–		5	–	4	–	0
Arkansas State Normal		–		3	–	3	–	0
Chattanooga		–		4	–	4	–	0
North Carolina		–		3	–	3	–	3
Oklahoma A&M		–		4	–	4	–	0
Delaware		–		3	–	4	–	1
Kendall		–		2	–	3	–	0
South Carolina		–		3	–	5	–	1
Texas A&M		–		3	–	5	–	0
Georgetown		–		2	–	4	–	1
Howard (AL)		–		2	–	4	–	0
Maryland		–		3	–	8	–	0
Birmingham		–		0	–	3	–	3
Stetson		–		0	–	1	–	1
Wake Forest		–		1	–	4	–	0
Goldey College		–		0	–	2	–	1
Mississippi College		–		0	–	1	–	0
Southwest Texas State		–		0	–	2	–	0
Marshall		–		0	–	6	–	0

The 1908 The Citadel Bulldogs football team represented The Citadel as an independent during the 1908 college football season. This was the fourth year of intercollegiate football at The Citadel, with Ralph Foster serving as coach for the third season. The Board of Visitors would not permit the cadets to travel outside the city of Charleston for games, and all games are believed to have been played at Hampton Park at the site of the old race course.

== Schedule ==
Date	Opponent	Site	Result	Source
October 10	Porter Military Academy	Charleston, SC	W 10–5	
October 17	Medical College of South Carolina	Charleston, SC	W 26–0	
	College of Charleston	Charleston, SC	T 0–0	
November 7	College of Charleston	Hampton Park; Charleston, SC	W 27–0	
November 17	Mercer	Charleston, SC	W 10–5	
November 26	South Carolina	Charleston, SC	L 0–12	
