= 1908 Chattanooga Moccasins football team =

American college football season

1908 Chattanooga Moccasins football
- Conference: Independent
- Record: 4–4
- Head coach: Jones Beene (1st season)
- Captain: James McGaughy
- Home stadium: Chamberlain Field

1908 Southern college football independents records
	Conf.			Overall
Team	W	L	T	W		L		T
Southwestern Louisiana Industrial		–		6	–	0	–	0
Virginia		–		7	–	0	–	1
Rollins		–		4	–	0	–	1
George Washington		–		8	–	1	–	1
Oklahoma		–		8	–	1	–	1
Tulane		–		7	–	1	–	0
North Carolina A&M		–		6	–	1	–	0
The Citadel		–		4	–	1	–	1
Navy		–		9	–	2	–	1
Florida		–		5	–	2	–	1
TCU		–		6	–	3	–	0
VMI		–		4	–	2	–	0
Davidson		–		5	–	3	–	1
Baylor		–		5	–	3	–	0
West Virginia		–		5	–	3	–	0
Kentucky State		–		4	–	3	–	0
Louisiana Industrial		–		4	–	3	–	1
Arkansas		–		5	–	4	–	0
Texas		–		5	–	4	–	0
VPI		–		5	–	4	–	0
Arkansas State Normal		–		3	–	3	–	0
Chattanooga		–		4	–	4	–	0
North Carolina		–		3	–	3	–	3
Oklahoma A&M		–		4	–	4	–	0
Delaware		–		3	–	4	–	1
Kendall		–		2	–	3	–	0
South Carolina		–		3	–	5	–	1
Texas A&M		–		3	–	5	–	0
Georgetown		–		2	–	4	–	1
Howard (AL)		–		2	–	4	–	0
Maryland		–		3	–	8	–	0
Birmingham		–		0	–	3	–	3
Stetson		–		0	–	1	–	1
Wake Forest		–		1	–	4	–	0
Goldey College		–		0	–	2	–	1
Mississippi College		–		0	–	1	–	0
Southwest Texas State		–		0	–	2	–	0
Marshall		–		0	–	6	–	0

The 1908 Chattanooga Moccasins football team represented the University of Chattanooga—now known as the University of Tennessee at Chattanooga—as an independent in the 1908 college football season.

== Schedule ==
Date	Opponent	Site	Result	Attendance	Source
October 17	Athens	Chamberlain Field; Chattanooga, TN	W 11–0		
October 24	Maryville (TN)	Chamberlain Field; Chattanooga, TN	W 21–6		
October 27	Central University	Chamberlain Field; Chattanooga, TN	L 0–24		
October 31	at Alabama	The Quad; Tuscaloosa, AL	L 6–23		
November 7	Howard (AL)	Chamberlain Field; Chattanooga, TN	W 29–0	700–800	
November 14	at Maryville	Maryville, TN	L 0–71		
November 21	at Tennessee	Waite Field; Knoxville, TN	L 5–35		
November 26	12th Cavalry	Olympic Park Field; Chattanooga, TN	W 8–5		
