= Battle of the Brazos =

American college football rivalry

- Baylor Bears Texas A&M Aggies
- Sport: Football
- First meeting: November 30, 1899; Texas A&M, 33–0
- Latest meeting: October 15, 2011; Texas A&M, 55–28

Statistics
- Total meetings: 108
- All-time series: Texas A&M leads, 68–31–9
- Largest victory: Baylor, 46–0 (1901); Texas A&M, 73–10 (2003)
- Longest win streak: Texas A&M, 13 (1991–2003)
- Current win streak: Texas A&M, 3 (2009–present)

Locations of Baylor and Texas A&M

The Battle of the Brazos is an American college football rivalry game between the Baylor Bears and Texas A&M Aggies. The rivalry is named for the Brazos River that flows by the two schools, which are 90 miles apart. The Battle of the Brazos debuted in 1899. The rivalry became dormant in 2012, when Texas A&M left the Big 12 Conference to join the Southeastern Conference.

== History ==
In the early days of the rivalry (1905 and earlier), Baylor and Texas A&M played each other multiple times in a single year, possibly due to a dearth of regional opponents. The two teams were also geographically close with only a one-hour train ride separating the two colleges. The term "Battle of the Brazos" was coined by former sports information director, Maxey Parrish.

=== The Brawl ===
The 1926 football game coincided with Baylor's homecoming. During halftime Baylor Homecoming floats paraded around the field. When a float – actually a car pulling a flatbed trailer with several female Baylor students – neared the section where the Texas A&M Corps of Cadets sat, a cadet raced towards the car and grabbed the steering wheel. The motion caused Louise Norman to fall off the truck, injuring her and inciting a large riot. Students began using metal folding chairs and planks of wood that had been used as yard markers for weapons. Texas A&M student Lt. Charles Sessums was hit in the head during the melee and, although he initially appeared to recover, he died following the game.

On December 8, 1926, the two school presidents agreed to temporarily suspend athletic relations between the schools. The schools would not compete against each other in any athletic event for the next four years. Baylor and Texas A&M would not meet in football again until 1931.

=== Pranks ===
In 1936 Baylor students awoke to find Texas A&M signs plastered across campus, with red paint applied to turn the Baylor flagpole into a barber pole. A huge sign on Waco Hall predicted, "A and M 50, Baylor 0."

It was once a tradition before a big football matchup for Aggie students to drive to Waco of capturing Baylor's bear mascot. Baylor students sometimes resorted to extraordinary defensive measures. In 1946 they placed mascot Chita in the custody of Waco Police so the Aggies could not find her.

In the 1950s, two Aggie students drove to Waco and stole the Baylor mascot, a young bear cub, from the Baylor campus. While they were driving back to College Station in a brand–new car belonging to one of their families, the bear panicked. Twenty–miles from Waco, the bear ripped out the inside of the car, and the boys set it free. The young men were caught when they took the car to be repaired. In 1954, Baylor mascot Nip and her trailer disappeared. Yet, the next day both the bear and trailer were found under a bridge on the highway to College Station.

In 2005 at Baylor Ballpark, a streaker carried a sign with "35–34" (in reference to Baylor defeating Texas A&M in football the previous fall) across right field. He was never caught, and the Bears went on to sweep Texas A&M in the series.

Baylor students likewise pranked the Aggies, often sneaking onto the Texas A&M campus to spray green paint on the statue of Lawrence Sullivan Ross. Ross was the third president of Texas A&M, who graduated from Baylor's two year college preparatory program.

Former U.S. House Majority Leader Tom DeLay was expelled from Baylor after he was in part found painting one of A&M's buildings green.

== Football ==
The competitive peak of the series between Baylor and Texas A&M most likely occurred between 1960 and 1990 during which time Baylor won 13 games, A&M won 16 games, and two games ended in ties. During that same time period 18 of the 31 games played saw the final margin of victory to be 7 points or less. Texas Football magazine voted the 1986 game between the schools the Game of the Decade of the 80s in the Southwest Conference. Baylor led the game 17–0 in the 1st half and was positioned to score again when the Texas A&M defense was able to stop the Bears with a goal line stand. The Aggies came back in the final minutes with an 80-yard drive resulting in a touchdown and a 31–30 victory. The victory allowed them to claim the SWC Championship and advance to the Cotton Bowl for a second straight year. while Baylor finished in 2nd and ended the year with a victory over Colorado in the Bluebonnet Bowl. Another exciting game was the 1978 contest in which little-known Baylor freshman Walter Abercrombie rushed for 207 yards in a 24–6 Baylor win in College Station. The 207 yards were a then NCAA record for rushing yardage in an initial game. In the 1980 contest Baylor won by the score of 46–7, going on that year to win the SWC Championship by a record 3 games and garnering a berth in the Cotton Bowl, where they were beaten by Alabama.

The thrilling 1986 A&M win began a period of domination in the series, in which Baylor did not beat A&M for 18 seasons (17 losses and a tie in 1990). The most lopsided match in the history of the rivalry occurred in 2003 when the Aggies routed the Bears by a score of 73–10. However, in 2004 an underdog Baylor Bear team defeated the No. 16 ranked Aggies 35–34 in overtime at Floyd Casey Stadium when the Bears converted a dramatic 2-point conversion on the final play of the game to earn their first win over the Aggies since 1985. The rivalry again became bitter in 2005 when the Aggies completed two fourth down conversions to win at home 16–13 in overtime.

The Baylor Bears defeated the Aggies for the second time in 5 years in 2008. Baylor has won 2 of the last 4 series games in Waco (2004 & 2008). In 2011 Texas A&M won the probable final meeting for the foreseeable future. With A&M's decision to leave the Big 12 Conference following the 2011 season (plus Baylor filing a lawsuit to prevent the Aggies' departure), resumption of the series is not likely at this point unless the two schools meet in a post season bowl game.

=== Game results ===
Baylor victories	Texas A&M victories	Tie games

No.	Date	Location	Winner	Score
1	November 30 1899	Waco	Texas A&M	33–0
2	October 11, 1901	Dallas	Texas A&M	6–0
3	November 5, 1901	Bryan	Baylor	17–6
4	November 28, 1901	Waco	Baylor	46–0
5	October 10, 1902	Dallas	Texas A&M	11–6
6	October 14, 1902	College Station	Texas A&M	22–0
7	November 7, 1903	Waco	Tie	0–0
8	November 14, 1903	Waco	Texas A&M	18–0
9	November 21, 1903	College Station	Texas A&M	5–0
10	October 15, 1904	Waco	Texas A&M	5–0
11	November 5, 1904	Waco	Texas A&M	10–0
12	October 28, 1905	Waco	Texas A&M	42–0
13	November 18, 1905	College Station	Texas A&M	17–5
14	October 10, 1908	College Station	Baylor	6–5
15	October 30, 1909	Waco	Texas A&M	9–6
16	November 18, 1911	College Station	Texas A&M	22–11
17	November 28, 1912	Dallas	Texas A&M	53–0
18	November 21, 1913	College Station	Tie	14–14
19	November 11, 1916	Waco	Texas A&M	3–0
20	November 10, 1917	Waco	Texas A&M	7–0
21	November 9, 1918	Waco	Texas A&M	19–0
22	November 8, 1919	Waco	Texas A&M	10–0
23	November 6, 1920	Waco	Texas A&M	24–0
24	November 5, 1921	Waco	Texas A&M	14–3
25	November 4, 1922	Waco	Baylor	13–7
26	November 3, 1923	Waco	Tie	0–0
27	November 1, 1924	Waco	Baylor	15–7
28	October 31, 1925	Waco	Texas A&M	13–0
29	November 30, 1926	Waco	Baylor	20–9
30	October 24, 1931	College Station	Texas A&M	33–7
31	October 22, 1932	Waco	Tie	0–0
32	October 28, 1933	College Station	Texas A&M	14–7
33	October 27, 1934	Waco	Texas A&M	10–7
34	October 26, 1935	College Station	Baylor	14–6
35	October 24, 1936	Waco	Tie	0–0
36	October 23, 1937	College Station	#15 Baylor	13–0
37	October 22, 1938	Waco	Tie	6–6
38	October 28, 1939	College Station	#5 Texas A&M	20–0
39	October 26, 1940	Waco	#4 Texas A&M	14–7
40	October 25, 1941	College Station	#9 Texas A&M	48–10
41	October 24, 1942	Waco	Baylor	6–0
42	October 27, 1945	College Station	Texas A&M	19–13
43	October 26, 1946	Waco	Texas A&M	17–0
44	October 25, 1947	College Station	Texas A&M	24–0
45	October 23, 1948	Waco	Baylor	20–14
46	October 22, 1949	College Station	#11 Baylor	21–0
47	October 28, 1950	Waco	Baylor	27–20
48	October 27, 1951	College Station	Tie	21–21
49	October 25, 1952	Waco	Baylor	21–20
50	October 24, 1953	College Station	#6 Baylor	14–13
51	October 23, 1954	Waco	Baylor	20–7
52	October 22, 1955	College Station	#12 Texas A&M	19–7
53	October 27, 1956	Waco	#7 Texas A&M	19–13
54	October 26, 1957	College Station	#2 Texas A&M	14–0
55	October 25, 1958	Waco	Texas A&M	33–27

No.	Date	Location	Winner	Score
56	October 24, 1959	College Station	Baylor	13–0
57	October 22, 1960	Waco	#7 Baylor	14–0
58	October 28, 1961	College Station	Texas A&M	23–0
59	October 27, 1962	Waco	Texas A&M	6–3
60	October 26, 1963	College Station	Baylor	34–7
61	October 24, 1964	Waco	Baylor	20–16
62	October 23, 1965	College Station	Baylor	31–0
63	October 22, 1966	Waco	Texas A&M	17–13
64	October 28, 1967	College Station	Texas A&M	21–3
65	October 26, 1968	Waco	Baylor	10–9
66	October 25, 1969	College Station	Texas A&M	24–0
67	October 24, 1970	Waco	Baylor	29–24
68	October 23, 1971	College Station	Texas A&M	10–9
69	October 28, 1972	Waco	Baylor	15–13
70	October 27, 1973	College Station	Texas A&M	28–22
71	October 26, 1974	Waco	#8 Texas A&M	20–0
72	October 25, 1975	College Station	#5 Texas A&M	19–10
73	October 16, 1976	College Station	Texas A&M	24–0
74	October 15, 1977	Waco	#13 Texas A&M	38–31
75	October 21, 1978	College Station	Baylor	24–6
76	September 15, 1979	Waco	Baylor	17–7
77	October 18, 1980	College Station	#13 Baylor	46–7
78	October 17, 1981	Waco	Baylor	19–17
79	October 16, 1982	College Station	Texas A&M	28–23
80	October 15, 1983	Waco	Tie	13–13
81	October 20, 1984	College Station	Baylor	20–16
82	October 19, 1985	Waco	#14 Baylor	20–15
83	October 18, 1986	College Station	#20 Texas A&M	31–30
84	October 17, 1987	Waco	Texas A&M	34–10
85	October 15, 1988	College Station	Texas A&M	28–14
86	October 21, 1989	Waco	#23 Texas A&M	14–11
87	October 20, 1990	College Station	Tie	20–20
88	October 19, 1991	Waco	#19 Texas A&M	34–12
89	October 24, 1992	College Station	#5 Texas A&M	19–13
90	October 16, 1993	Waco	#13 Texas A&M	34–17
91	October 15, 1994	College Station	#7 Texas A&M	41–21
92	October 21, 1995	Waco	#22 Texas A&M	24–9
93	November 9, 1996	Waco	Texas A&M	24–7
94	November 8, 1997	College Station	#21 Texas A&M	38–10
95	October 17, 1998	Waco	#10 Texas A&M	35–14
96	October 9, 1999	College Station	#13 Texas A&M	45–13
97	October 14, 2000	Waco	Texas A&M	24–0
98	October 6, 2001	College Station	#24 Texas A&M	16–10
99	October 12, 2002	Waco	Texas A&M	41–0
100	October 11, 2003	College Station	Texas A&M	73–10
101	October 30, 2004	Waco	Baylor	35–34^{OT}
102	October 1, 2005	College Station	Texas A&M	16–13^{OT}
103	October 28, 2006	Waco	#22 Texas A&M	31–21
104	September 29, 2007	College Station	Texas A&M	34–10
105	November 15, 2008	Waco	Baylor	41–21
106	November 21, 2009	College Station	Texas A&M	38–3
107	November 13, 2010	Waco	#23 Texas A&M	42–30
108	October 15, 2011	College Station	#21 Texas A&M	55–28
Series: Texas A&M leads 68–31–9

== Basketball ==
In men's basketball, Baylor and A&M have competed since the 1914–15 debut season of the Southwest Conference. With 218 games played, A&M leads the series with 139 wins, 75 losses and 4 ties. Since the formation of the Big 12 the teams have followed somewhat parallel paths. Both spent the early years of the conference as lower-division teams (they combined for one NIT appearance and zero NCAA appearances from 1996 to 2004, and both suffered winless conference seasons during that span). However, in more recent years, they have grown into Big 12 contenders, with A&M reaching the NCAA's six straight years between 2006 and 2011 and Baylor making NCAA tourney appearances in 2008 before advancing all the way to the Elite 8 in 2010 and 2012. In 2011, Baylor did not reach postseason play but swept the series with the NCAA Tourney-Bound Aggies. After Texas A&M moved to the SEC in 2012, the Battle of the Brazos was put on hold. One of the more memorable games occurred on January 23, 2008, when Baylor defeated A&M 116–100 in a five overtime marathon in College Station. Both teams were nationally ranked. It is the longest game and most points scored in Big 12 history. The two schools scheduled out of conference games in 2014 and 2015, with each team winning on their home floor. In their most recent meeting, the #24 ranked Aggies beat the #16 Bears by a score of 80–61.

== See also ==
- List of NCAA college football rivalry games
- List of most-played college football series in NCAA Division I
