= Carroll Field =

Exhibition ground in Waco, Texas

Caroll Field
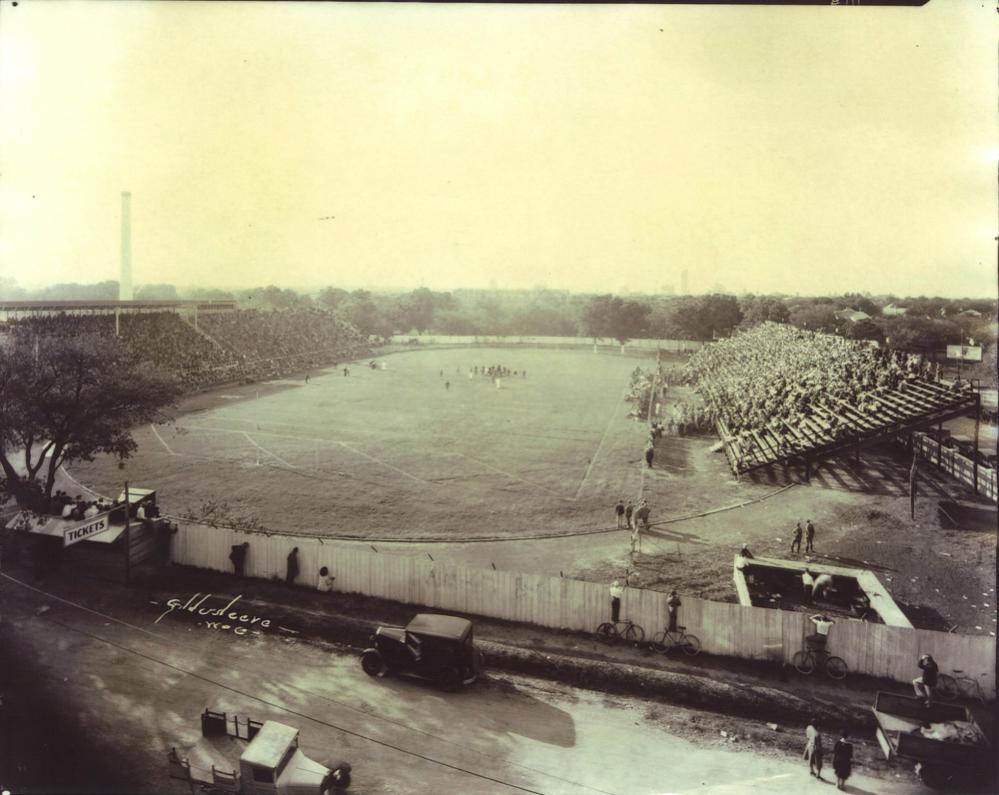
- Carroll Field, 1922
- Interactive map of Caroll Field
- Location: Waco, Texas
- Coordinates: 31.546867°N 97.120866°W
- Owner: Baylor University
- Capacity: 15,000 (1930s)
- Surface: grass

Construction
- Opened: 1902
- Renovated: 1915 (Lee Carroll Field's Athletic Building)
- Closed: 1935
- Demolished: 1939–1940

Tenant
- Baylor Bears (1902–1925, 1930–1935)

Carroll Field was an exhibition ground in Waco, Texas, owned by Baylor University; the Baylor Bears football program played games there from 1902 to 1925, with the exception of 1906 when football was banned on campus, and from 1930 to 1935. Following the construction of the Carroll Science Building in 1902, the field was located between the building and Waco Creek; the field took over as the location of football games from an unnamed field adjacent to and northwest of Old Main. Lee Carroll made a donation for the field to be constructed, and his father and grandfather had also donated to build the Carroll Science Building and Carroll Library. From 1926 to 1929, Baylor football games were played at the Cotton Palace in Waco. During Baylor's first season, they were beat 33–0 by Texas A&M, but the Waco Times-Herald attempted to make the loss positive, saying, "For an eleven many of whose players did not know the shape of the oval until this season, Baylor put up a fair exhibition.”

During Thanksgiving Day 1909, Carroll Field was the location of Baylor's first Homecoming football game; the 5,000 attendees to the football game paid US$1 each and, at the time, the crowd was known as the largest ever. In the football game, Baylor defeated Texas Christian University, who had shut out Baylor in their last two games, 6–3.

== Student Union Building ==
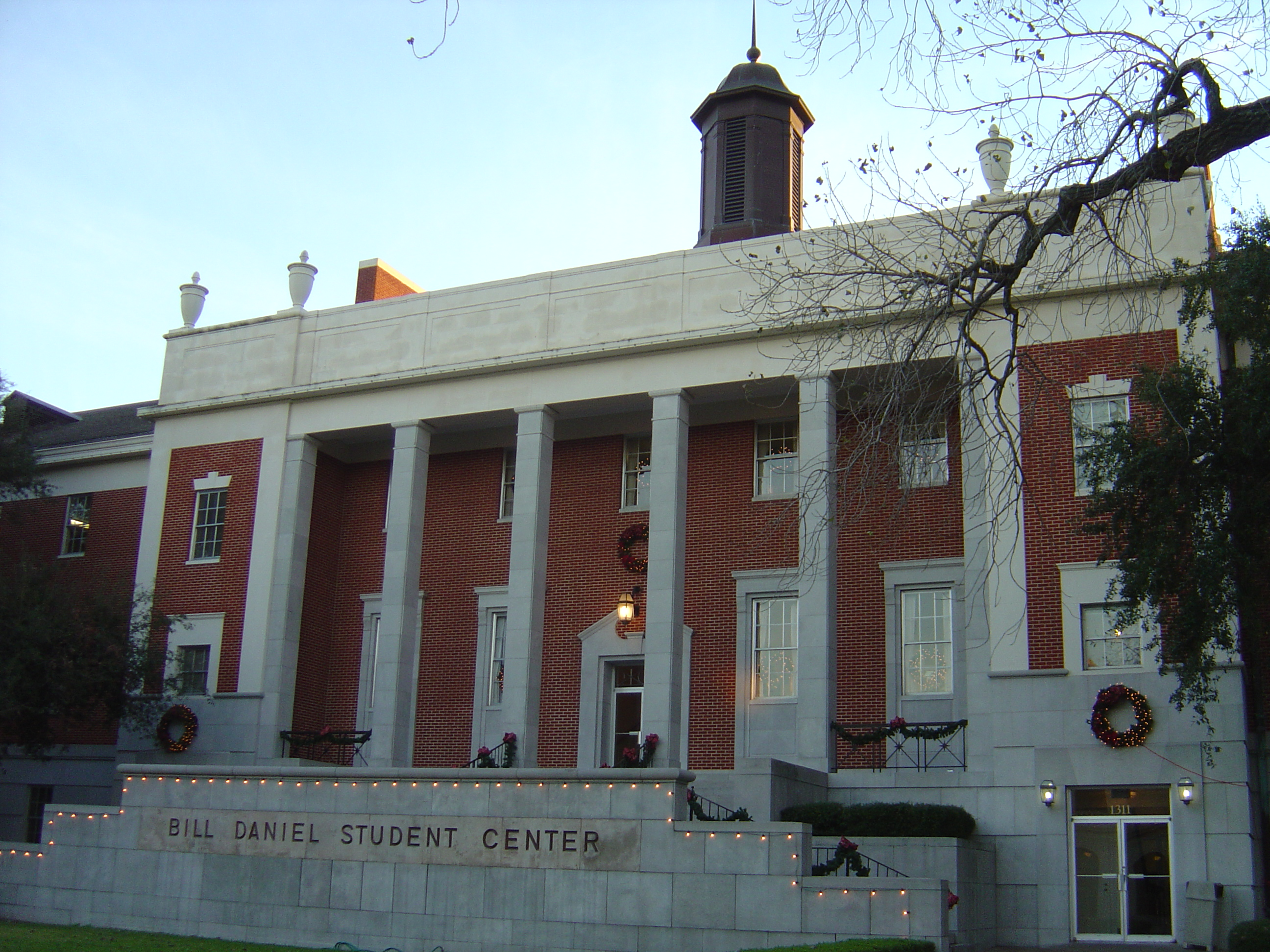
Current Student Union Building on the site of the former Caroll Field

In 1940, groundbreaking began for Baylor University's Student Union Building on the location of Carroll Field, but since 1935, the new Waco Stadium had hosted Baylor football games. The Student Union Building now has the Carroll Field sign proudly displayed on a wall inside.
