= 1908 Howard Crimson and Blue football team =

American college football season

1908 Howard Crimson and Blue football
- Conference: Southern Intercollegiate Athletic Association
- Record: 2–4 (0–3 SIAA)
- Head coach: John Counselman (3rd season; first 2 games); Winton M. Blount (1st season, last 4 games)
- Home stadium: West End Park

1908 Southern Intercollegiate Athletic Association football standings
	Conf.					Overall
Team	W		L		T	W		L		T
LSU +	2	–	0	–	0	10	–	0	–	0
Auburn +	4	–	1	–	0	6	–	1	–	0
Vanderbilt	3	–	0	–	1	7	–	2	–	1
Tennessee	3	–	2	–	0	7	–	2	–	0
Georgia Tech	4	–	3	–	0	6	–	3	–	0
Georgia	2	–	2	–	1	5	–	2	–	1
Alabama	1	–	1	–	1	6	–	1	–	1
Sewanee	1	–	1	–	1	4	–	1	–	3
Mississippi A&M	1	–	3	–	0	3	–	4	–	0
Ole Miss	0	–	2	–	0	3	–	5	–	0
Mercer	0	–	3	–	0	3	–	4	–	0
Howard (AL)	0	–	3	–	0	2	–	4	–	0
Clemson	0	–	4	–	0	1	–	6	–	0
Nashville			–					–
+ – Conference co-champions

The 1908 Howard Crimson and Blue football team was an American football team that represented Howard College (now known as the Samford University) during the 1908 Southern Intercollegiate Athletic Association football season. The team compiled an 2–4 record, with John Counselman going 0–2 through the first two games and Winton M. Blount going 2–2 for the final four games of the season.

== Schedule ==
Date	Opponent	Site	Result	Attendance	Source
October 3	Auburn	West End Park; Birmingham, AL	L 0–18		
October 10	Alabama	West End Park; Birmingham, AL	L 0–17		
November 7	at Chattanooga	Chamberlain Field; Chattanooga, TN	L 0–29	700–800	
November 14	at Jacksonville State	Anniston, AL (rivalry)	W 21–0		
November 21	vs. Birmingham	West End Park; Birmingham, AL	W 12–11		
November 26	at Mercer	Central City Park; Macon, GA	L 0–45		
