= Mississippi College Collegians football, 1907–1909 =

American college football seasons

The Mississippi College Collegians football program's first three seasons of competition were from 1907 to 1909, representing Mississippi College, located in Clinton, Mississippi, as an independent.

== 1907 ==
1907 Mississippi College Collegians football
- Conference: Independent
- Record: 1–0
- Head coach: None

The 1907 Mississippi College Collegians football team represented Mississippi College as an independent during the 1907 college football season.

=== Schedule ===
| Date | Opponent | Site | Result | Source |
|---|---|---|---|---|
| December 6 | Chamberlain-Hunt Academy | Clinton, MS | W 6–0 | |

== 1908 ==
1908 Mississippi College Collegians football
- Conference: Independent
- Record: 0–1
- Head coach: None

The 1908 Mississippi College Collegians football team was an American football team that represented Mississippi College as an independent in the 1908 college football season. Playing without a head coach, the team compiled an overall record of 0–1.

=== Schedule ===
| Date | Opponent | Site | Result | Source |
|---|---|---|---|---|
| October 29 | vs. Ole Miss | State Fairgrounds; Jackson, MS | L 0–41 | |

== 1909 ==
1909 Mississippi College Collegians football
- Conference: Independent
- Record: 3–0
- Head coach: Dr. Kern (1st season)
- Captain: Clyde Blankinship

The 1909 Mississippi College Collegians football team was an American football team that represented Mississippi College as an independent in the 1909 college football season. Led by Dr. Kern is his first and only season as head coach, the team compiled an overall record of 3–0. Clyde Blankinship, who played at halfback, was the team's captain.

=== Schedule ===
| Date | Opponent | Site | Result | Source |
|---|---|---|---|---|
| September 28 | French Camp Academy | Clinton, MS | W 29–0 | |
| October 16 | Chamberlain-Hunt Academy | Clinton, MS | W 94–0 | |
| October 23 | at University of Memphis | Red Elm Park; Memphis, TN | W 6–5 | |
