= History of Tennessee Volunteers football =

The Tennessee Volunteers football team represents the University of Tennessee in American football.

== Overview ==
=== Early history (1891–1963) ===
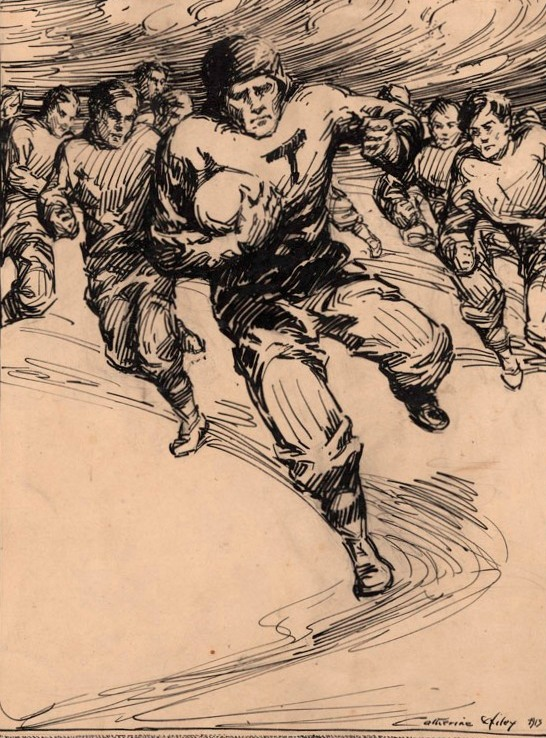
Mid-1890s yearbook sketch of a UT football player by artist Catherine Wiley

Tennessee's football program began in 1891, organized in large part by Henry Denlinger, a teacher who had played at Princeton. The team's first game, a loss to Sewanee, was played on November 21, 1891. The program's first win did not come until October 25, 1892, when they defeated Maryville College in Maryville, Tennessee, by a score of 25–0. Tennessee competed in their first 5 seasons without a coach.

In October 1894, the Athletic Association had resolved to drop varsity football and look forward to baseball in the spring of 1895. After the humiliating 1893 season with two wins and four imposing defeats, only two athletes willing to admit they had played on the 1893 team returned to campus in 1894. To complicate matters further, the practice field, located just west of the main entrance to the Hill, was being graded and improved. Soon after the Athletic Association's decision, W. B. Stokely, a UT senior who transferred from Wake Forest University, persuaded a group of students to form a team in the fall of 1894. Stokely, who was elected captain, gave encouragement and direction to the other players. Even though the institution chose not to be represented officially on the gridiron in 1894, Stokely and his unofficial team kept football interest alive during this period when almost certainly it otherwise would have been allowed to lapse completely. These unofficial games, referred to as "The Lost Years", are not included in NCAA statistics or in official UT win–loss records. The 1896 team was the first "official team", posting the school's first winning record, and joining the Southern Intercollegiate Athletic Association, the first Southern athletics conference. 1898 was UT's first time to not have an active football team, due to the Spanish–American War.

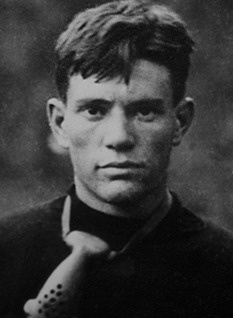
Nathan Dougherty with nose guard.

Tennessee played on Waite Field during these days, on the southeast corner of 15th street and Cumberland avenue, where the Walters Life Science Building now stands.

In 1899, J. A. Pierce became the first head coach of the team. Author Nash Buckingham was a prominent athlete in 1901 and 1902, two of Tennessee's strongest early elevens. The 1902 team scored on rival Vanderbilt for the first time, and also featured halfback Tootsie Douglas, who booted a 109-yard punt (the field length was 110 yards in those days) in a blizzard, against John Heisman's Clemson Tigers. (Note: Douglas went on to play for Navy where in 1907 he was the second player from the south to make Walter Camp's third-team All-America.) Fullback Sam Y. Parker of the 1904 and 1905 teams made Buckingham's All-Southern team in 1904, and was murdered in 1906 for an alleged affair. Roscoe 'Piggy' Ward was the school's only three-time captain. The 1908 team coached by George Levene was considered the best Tennessee football yet assembled, led by All-Southerns captain Walker Leach and College Football Hall of Fame inductee Nathan Dougherty. Its four SIAA wins was the most in school history. Vanderbilt coach Dan McGugin noted "All things considered, Leach was perhaps the best football player of the year in Dixie." The 1909 team won only a single game, and Levene was fired. The 1910 team was coached by former Sewanee tackle Lex Stone.

The team had several coaches with short tenures until Zora Clevenger took over in 1911. The 1912 squad was the first non-losing Volunteer team in four years, but they did not win a conference game. In 1914, Clevenger led the Vols to a dominant 9–0 season and their first championship of any kind (even state titles), winning the Southern Intercollegiate Athletic Association title. The team included All-Southerns end Goat Carroll, tackle Farmer Kelly, guard Mush Kerr and fullback Rus Lindsay. Tennessee beat rival Vanderbilt for the first time, passing for two touchdowns to Carroll in a 16–14 victory. The 1914 Vols were retroactively awarded a national championship by 1st-N-Goal, though this remains largely unrecognized.

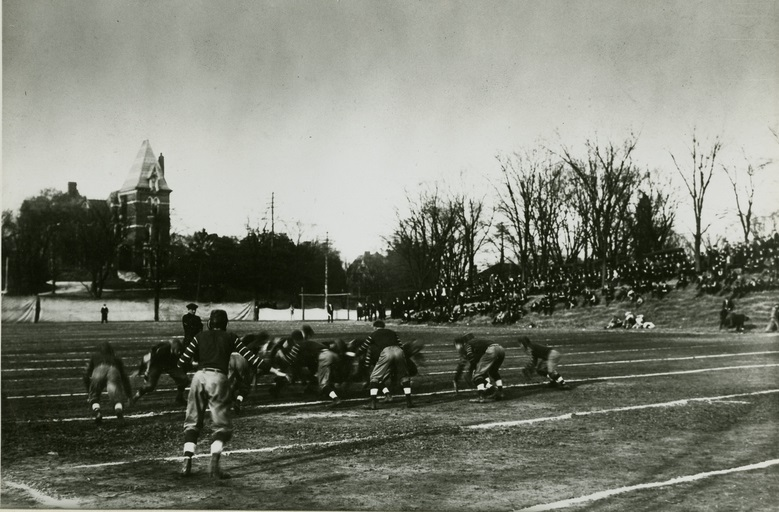
UT on Waite Field

The Vols would again field an undefeated squad in 1916 under coach John R. Bender, but consistency was still elusive. A second, unblemished SIAA championship in three years was relegated to a tie with Georgia Tech when Kentucky held Tennessee to a scoreless tie in the final week of play. End Graham Vowell was a unanimous All-Southern selection. Chink Lowe also made some All-Southern teams. The New York Herald ranked quarterback Buck Hatcher as the season's premier punter.

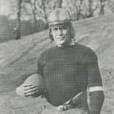
Graham Vowell

Professor Dougherty officially suspended varsity football during the World War I years of 1917 and 1918 because the majority of the players were called into military service. In addition, Coach Bender was enlisted as an instructor at Camp John Sevier in Greenville, South Carolina. During this period without varsity football, two unofficial teams were formed from Army recruits and students. One team represented a training unit called the Fighting Mechanics and the other represented the Student Army Training Corps (SATC). Vanderbilt beat the SATC 78–0 in 1918, and counts the game as one against the Volunteers.

Under new coach M. B. Banks, in 1920, 1921, and 1922 the Vols lost to rival Vanderbilt and one other opponent. In 1921, Shields–Watkins Field, the core of modern Neyland Stadium, was built. The new home of the Vols was named after William S. Shields and his wife Alice Watkins Shields, the financial backers of the field. The field used bleachers that could seat 3,200, and had been used for baseball the prior year. The inaugural game at Shields–Watkins field was played on September 24, 1921, and resulted in a 27–0 Tennessee victory over Emory and Henry College. Rufe Clayton scored the first touchdown in the new stadium. After the loss to Vanderbilt, Tennessee had its first ever victory over the Mississippi A&M Aggies, a 14–7 win. Roe Campbell spearheaded the first touchdown drive. In 1922, the team began to wear orange jerseys for the first time after previously wearing black jerseys. The 1923 team lost to Vanderbilt 51–7, the worst loss to the Commodores since 1909 (disregarding 1918). Estes Kefauver played as a guard on the team. In 1924 and 1925, J. G. Lowe, the brother of Chink, was the last Vol football player to serve as captain two years in a row until 2004.

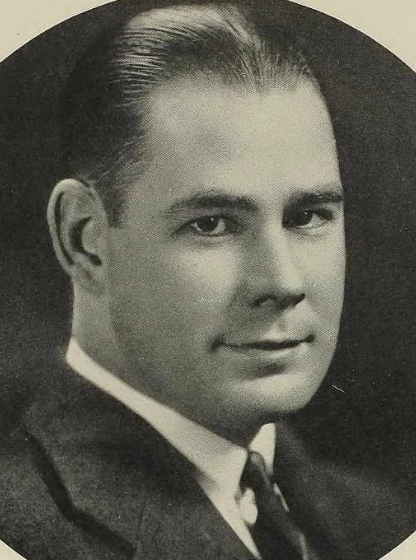
Coach Neyland

Robert Neyland took over as head coach in 1926. At the time, Neyland was a captain in the United States Army and an ROTC instructor at the school. In the 1929 season at least, his two assistant coaches (also ROTC instructors) out-ranked him. Former player Dougherty, who had then become dean of the school's engineering program and chairman of athletics, stated the priority: "Even the score with Vanderbilt", referring to the Nashville school which had been dominating football in the state under coach Dan McGugin. Captain Neyland led the Vols to a 76–7–5 record from 1926 to 1934. This first stint with UT for Neyland saw the Vols rattle off undefeated streaks of 33, 28, and 14 games, including five undefeated seasons (1927, 1928, 1929, 1931, and 1932). Neyland lost to Vanderbilt in his first season, but either won or tied Vanderbilt in his next seven seasons. Neyland captured the school's first Southern Conference title in 1927, in only his second year on the job. The Commodores were up late until a Dick Dodson run tied the score. "After the game McGugin questioned each of his players as to his whereabouts during the run. Without exception the players claimed that two men had blocked them. McGugin shrugged. "Well, we'll just protest the play. It's perfectly obvious that Tennessee had 22 men on the field." Led by captain John Barnhill, the team won all its other games.

Longtime Georgia Tech football coach Bobby Dodd led Tennessee at quarterback to back-to-back unbeaten seasons with identical 9–0–1 records his sophomore and junior years in 1928 and 1929.

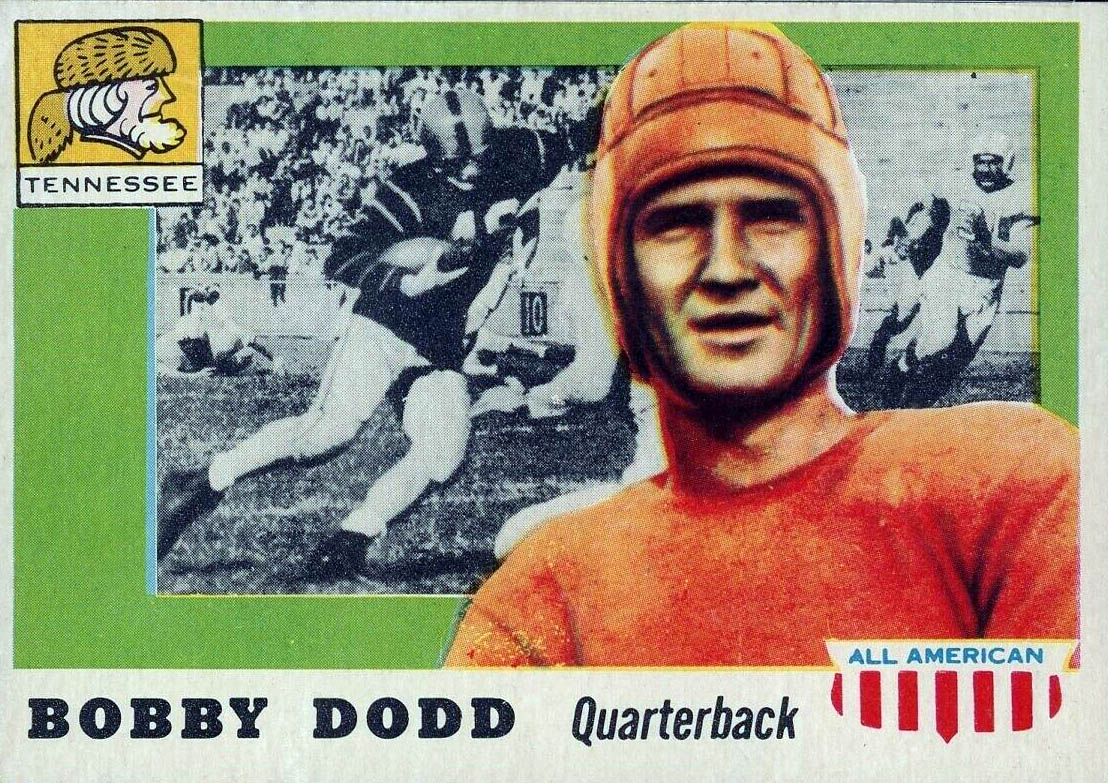
Dodd at Tennessee depicted on a trading card in the 1950s.

The 1928 Vols beat Vanderbilt for the first time since 1916, scored an upset victory over coach Wallace Wade's heavily favored Alabama Crimson Tide, and beat the Florida Gators team which led the nation in scoring by a single point, in the mud. Again like 1916, the season's only blemish was a scoreless tie with Kentucky. In 1929, Gene McEver became the football program's first ever All-American. He led the nation in scoring, and his 130 points stood as a 95-year-long school record until Dylan Sampson scored 132 in 2024. Dodd was named to Grantland Rice's All-America team in 1930, making him the 2nd granted that honor at Tennessee, following McEver. McEver missed the entire 1930 season with torn ligaments in his knee. His prior sidekick at halfback Buddy Hackman filled the void and made All-Southern. During Dodd's tenure, the Vols went 33 games without a loss until an 18–6 setback against national champion Alabama in 1930, which ranks as the longest unbeaten streak in UT history. After the loss, Dodd and his teammates helped kick off another unbeaten streak lasting 28 games that ranks as the second longest. (Note: In 1959, Dodd was named to the University of Tennessee's Hall of Fame and to the College Football Hall of Fame as a player. He was elected in the same year as teammate Herman Hickman.)

In the 1930s, Tennessee saw a number of more firsts. They played in the New York City Charity Game on December 5, 1931, the program's first ever bowl game. Led by Herman Hickman, they scored a 13–0 victory over New York University. Hickman's performance caught the eye of sportswriter Grantland Rice, who added Hickman to his All American team, and he would later play professionally for the Brooklyn Dodgers. Led by a backfield with Deke Brackett and Beattie Feathers, the 1932 team were SoCon champions.

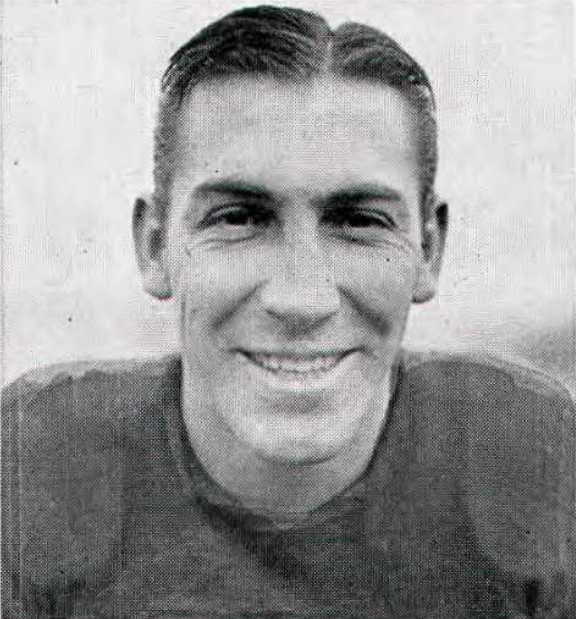
Beattie Feathers

After the 1932 season, Tennessee joined the newly formed Southeastern Conference, setting the stage for decades of new and now storied rivalries with such teams like Alabama, Florida, Georgia, Kentucky, and Vanderbilt. In 1933, Wallace Wade's Duke Blue Devils upset Neyland's Vols 10–2, the first loss for the Vols in over 2 1/2 seasons. It caused Neyland to say of Fred Crawford, the first first-team All-American from the state of North Carolina: "He gave the finest exhibition of tackle play I have ever seen." After the 1934 season, Neyland was called into military service in Panama.

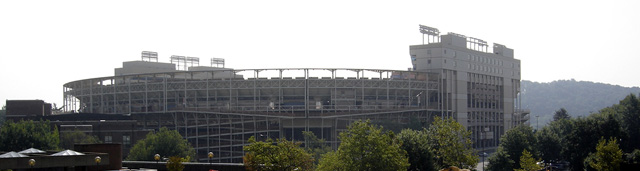
Neyland Stadium, named for Robert Neyland.

Tennessee struggled to a losing record during Neyland's time in Panama. He returned to find a rebuilding project in 1936. In 1936 and 1937, the Vols won six games each season. However, in 1938, Neyland's Vols began one of the more impressive streaks in NCAA football history. Led by the likes of Tennessee's only three time All-American Bob Suffridge, the 1938 Tennessee Volunteers football team won the school's first National Championship and earned a trip to the Orange Bowl, the team's first major bowl, where they pounded fellow unbeaten Oklahoma by a score of 17–0. They outscored their opponents 283–16. The 1939 regular season was even more impressive. The 1939 team was the last NCAA team ever to hold their opponents scoreless for an entire regular season. Surprisingly, the Vols did not earn a national title that year despite being ranked #1 for most of the season, but did earn a trip to the famed Rose Bowl. The Vols were without the services of tailback George Cafego, who would finish fourth in the Heisman voting and be the top pick in the NFL draft, due to a knee injury. Cafego's backup was also injured. For a single-wing squad heavily dependent upon the tailback position, it proved to be too much for the Vols to overcome. In front of a crowd of over 90,000, Tennessee fell by a score of 14–0 to Southern California. That loss ended UT's streak of 17 straight shutout games and 71 consecutive shutout quarters, NCAA records to this day.

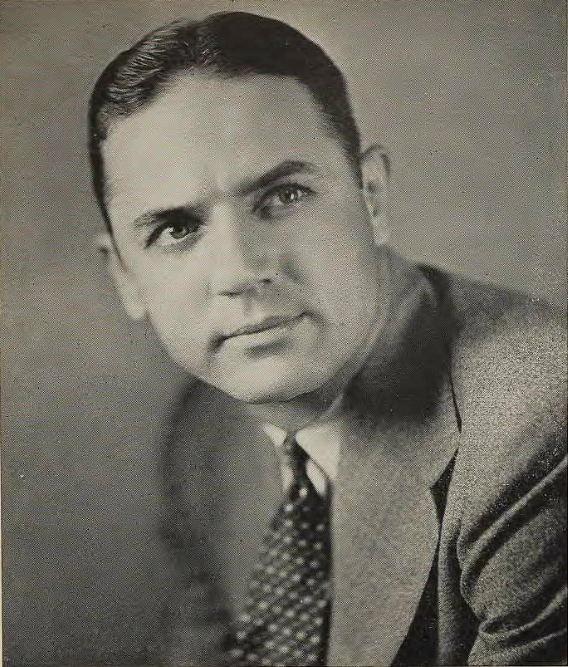
John Barnhill

The 1940 Vols put together a third consecutive undefeated regular season (Neyland's eighth such season with the Vols). That team earned a national title from two minor polls, and received the school's first bid to the Sugar Bowl, where they lost to Boston College. After the 1940 season, Neyland was again pressed into military service, this time for World War II. His successor, assistant and former player John Barnhill, did well in his absence, going 32–5–2 during the war years of 1941 to 1945. The UT Athletic Council officially suspended varsity football in 1943 because the majority of the players were called into military service in the war.

After World War II, Neyland retired from the military with the rank of brigadier general, and returned to Knoxville. From 1946 to 1952, Neyland's Vols had a record of 54–17–4. They won conference titles in 1946 and 1951, and national titles in 1950 and 1951. The 1950 season included what would prove to be the highest profile matchup between the South's two biggest coaching legends: General Neyland and Paul "Bear" Bryant, then at Kentucky. Both teams were ranked in the top ten. The Vols defeated Bryant, Kentucky star quarterback Babe Parilli, and the Wildcats, 7–0. Bryant would never win a game against Neyland. The 1950 season culminated with a win against #2 Texas in Dallas at the Cotton Bowl Classic. The 1951 team featured Hank Lauricella, that season's Heisman Trophy runner up, and Doug Atkins, a future college football and Pro Football Hall of Fame performer. The Vols romped to a 10–0 regular season record (Neyland's ninth undefeated regular season) and the AP National Title. Neyland retired due to poor health in 1952 after taking the Vols to an 8–2–1 record, and took the position of athletic director. His final game was the 1953 Cotton Bowl against Texas, where Tennessee was shut out 16–0. The Vols would see spotty success for some 40 years after that, but it would be the late 1980s and 1990s before the Tennessee program had similar winning percentages.

Harvey Robinson had the tough task of replacing General Neyland, and only stuck around for two seasons. Following the 1954 season, Neyland fired Robinson and replaced him with Bowden Wyatt, who had seen success at Wyoming and Arkansas. Neyland called the move "the hardest thing I've ever had to do." Wyatt, who had been a Hall of Fame player for Neyland, struggled at Tennessee. He won more than 6 games only twice, in 1956 and 1957. The 1956 squad won an SEC Championship, going 10–1 and finishing the season ranked #2. That year, UT won one of the greatest games in team history, a 6–0 victory over Georgia Tech in Atlanta when both teams were ranked #2 and #3, respectively. It was voted the second best game in college football history by Sports Illustrated's 100th Anniversary of College Football issue (published in 1969). Tech was coached by former UT Hall of Fame quarterback, and revered Yellow Jacket coach, Bobby Dodd. In the final minutes of a legendary defensive struggle, UT was backed up just ahead of their own goal line, but star tailback and future head coach Johnny Majors took a direct snap and booted a roughly 70-yard punt deep into Yellow Jacket territory to seal the win. Majors would finish second in the Heisman voting that year; it was a controversial vote that resulted in the only time a player from a losing squad, Paul Hornung of 2–8 Notre Dame, won the trophy. Wyatt's team never returned to a bowl game after the 1957 season. Assistant James McDonald took over for Wyatt in 1963, going 5–5. Before the 1962 season, on March 28, 1962, General Neyland died in New Orleans. Shields–Watkins Field was then presented with a new and appropriate name: Neyland Stadium. The stadium was dedicated at the 1962 Alabama game, and by that time had expanded to 52,227 seats. Reflecting Tennessee's growth in stature over the years, this represented a more than 14-fold increase in capacity since Neyland's arrival on The Hill 38 years earlier. By comparison, when the stadium first opened, it was not even a fraction of the size of Vanderbilt's Dudley Field. Incidentally, Neyland had a hand in designing the expansion efforts for the stadium while he was athletic director. His plans were so forward-looking that they were used for every expansion until 1996, when the stadium was expanded to 102,544 seats.

=== Doug Dickey era (1964–1969) ===
Doug Dickey, who had been an assistant at Arkansas under Frank Broyles, replaced McDonald in 1964. Dickey was entrusted with rebuilding the program, and his six seasons at the school saw considerable change, including the "three T's". In one of his first moves, Dickey scrapped the single wing formation and replaced it with the more modern T formation offense, in which the quarterback takes the snap "under center." This move was in part prompted by the fact that the single wing was by then a relatively rare offense and top high school players did not necessarily want to play in it. (Note: One such player was Steve Spurrier, then a top quarterback prospect from Johnson City in the Tri-Cities area, who had no interest in becoming a single-wing tailback and opted to play for Coach Ray Graves at Florida instead.) Dickey also changed the helmets of the Vols, removing numbers from the side and replacing them with a "T." His third change also remains today. Dickey worked with the Pride of the Southland Marching Band to create a unique pregame entrance for the football squad. The band would open a block T with its base at the locker room tunnel. The team would then run through the T to the sideline. The T was reoriented in the 1980s when the locker room was moved behind the north end zone, and the entrance remains a prized tradition of the football program. In addition to the "three T's", Dickey instituted the now universally recognized checkerboard endzone design and signed the school's first black player, wideout Lester McClain.

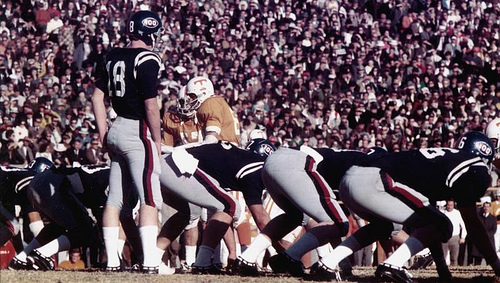
Archie Manning vs. Tennessee, 1969

Dickey had some success in his six seasons as a Vol. He led Tennessee to a 46–15–4 record and captured SEC titles in 1967 and 1969. In the 1967 season, UT lost its season opening game to UCLA in the Los Angeles Memorial Coliseum. Bruin quarterback Gary Beban, who would win the Heisman Trophy that year, scored the winning touchdown in the final minutes on a fourth-down scramble. The Vols won their remaining nine regular season games, however, including the Alabama game, in which they handed Alabama its only loss of the year, and snapping a 25-game unbeaten streak by the Tide. The 24–13 win in Birmingham landed the Vols on the cover of Sports Illustrated, and was Dickey's biggest career win.

=== Bill Battle era (1970–1976) ===
Following the 1969 season, Dickey left Tennessee to coach at his alma mater, the University of Florida. He would later return to Tennessee as the Athletic Director. Dickey was replaced by Bill Battle. Battle was a 28-year-old coach from Alabama, had played and served as an assistant coach for the legendary Bear Bryant, and was the youngest head coach in the country at the time that he took over. Led by star quarterback Condredge Holloway (who, only three years after the Vols removed their color bar, became one of the first black QBs to gain national attention), Battle's teams won at least 10 games in his first three seasons; however, he lost to Auburn in each of those seasons and never finished higher than tied for 4th place in an era where Auburn and Alabama dominated the SEC. Therefore, he did not win a conference title, and would not do so during his time as head coach.

=== Johnny Majors era (1977–1992) ===
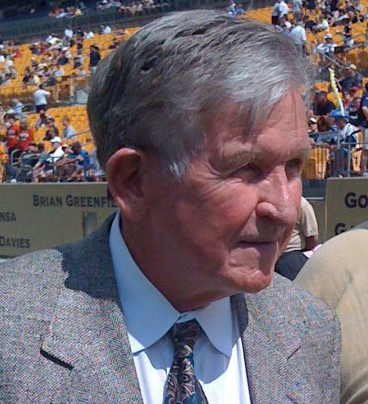
Coach Majors

Johnny Majors, who had played at UT from 1954 to 1956 before playing with the Montreal Alouettes in 1957, won a national championship at Pittsburgh in 1976 and decided that the job of head coach at Tennessee was too good to pass up. In 1977, he replaced Battle, who had just suffered two five-loss seasons. Majors lost his first game as head coach to the University of California, by a score of 27–17, in Knoxville. Majors struggled his first four seasons, going 4–7, 5–5–1, 7–5, and 5–6. His teams saw mild success in 1981, going to the Garden State Bowl and finishing 8–4, and in 1983, winning the Citrus Bowl and finishing 9–3.

Majors' 1985 Volunteer squad (9–1–2, 5–1) was one of his most revered squads. The team lost only one game, regrouped after losing the services of Heisman trophy contending quarterback Tony Robinson for the season, and won their first conference title since 1969. The Big Orange earned a trip to the 1986 Sugar Bowl, where they defeated the heavily favored and 2nd-ranked Miami Hurricanes, coached by Jimmy Johnson, 35–7. The win kept Miami from winning a national title and earned the 1985 UT squad the nickname "Sugar Vols." Also during the Majors era, Tennessee began to be known as "Wide Receiver U" after several of UT's wide receivers went on to play in the NFL. Some of these players that started this reputation included, Tim McGee, Willie Gault, Eric Swanson, and Joey Clinkscales. The 1988 Vols lost their first 6 games, but went on to finish with a 5–6 record. UT then won back-to-back SEC titles in 1989 and 1990. The Vols played on a January 1 bowl game every season in the early '90s under Majors. However, in the fall of 1992, Majors suffered heart problems, and missed the early part of the season. Phillip Fulmer, then the offensive coordinator, took over as interim coach, and scored upsets over Georgia and Florida. Majors returned and lost three straight conference games to Arkansas, Alabama, and South Carolina. The Alabama loss cut the deepest as the Vols had lost seven in a row to the Crimson Tide. The administration decided to make a change after the regular season. Majors was forced to resign, and Fulmer coached the team in the Hall of Fame Bowl.

=== Phillip Fulmer era (1992–2008) ===
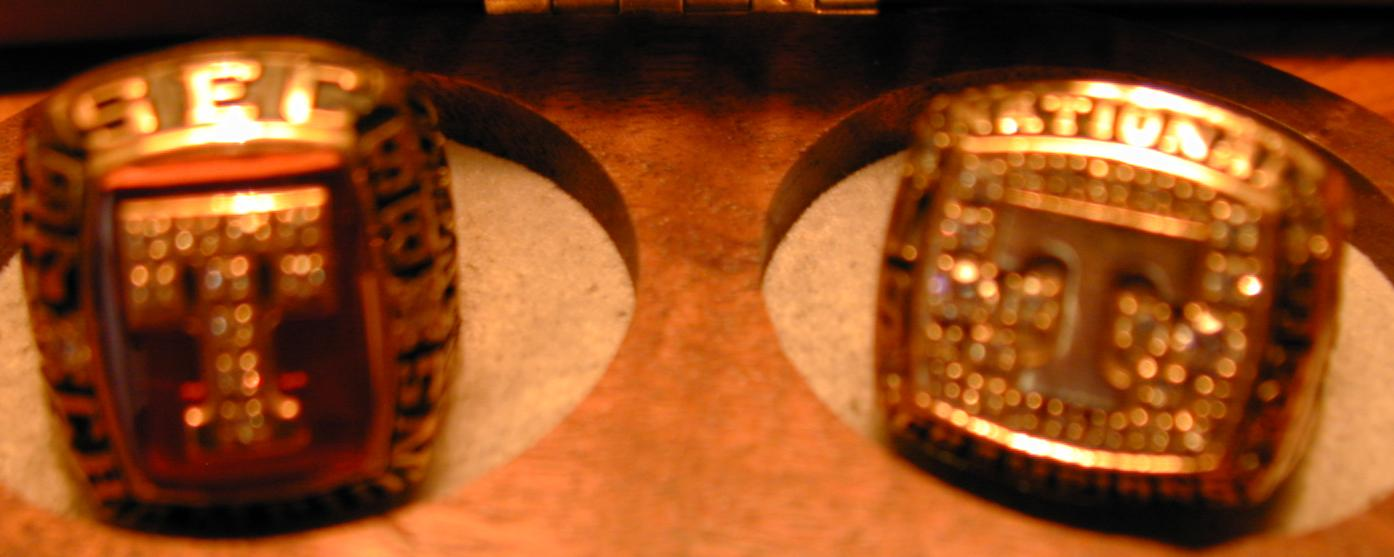
SEC and National Championship rings for the 1998 Vols

1993 saw the Vols complete a 10–2 season, losing to Penn State in the Florida Citrus Bowl. 1994 saw a down turn in the record of the Vols, but events shaped the bright future of the program. Starting quarterback Jerry Colquitt suffered a season ending knee injury in the first series of the season against UCLA. Backup Todd Helton suffered a similar fate early in the fourth game of the year at Mississippi State requiring backups Brandon Stewart and Peyton Manning to take action. The following week freshman quarterback Peyton Manning would take over the controls and not let go until he departed to the NFL. Manning would be a 4-year starter for the Vols, and he led them to an 8–4 record in 1994. The next season, Manning led the Vols to a 41–14 win over Alabama, breaking the long winless streak. The only loss of the 1995 season was a 62–37 loss to Florida. The loss to the Gators was the 3rd in a row, and would prove to be the major hurdle between the Vols and the national title.

The Vols would put together 11–1, 10–2, and 11–2 seasons in the last three seasons with Manning as quarterback. Manning entered his senior season as a solid favorite for the Heisman Trophy. The trophy would eventually be awarded to Charles Woodson of Michigan. Manning did lead the Vols to an SEC title in 1997, before losing his final game to eventual co-National Champion Nebraska.

After three seasons with high expectations, the Vols faced a new task. Tennessee was expected to have a slight fall off after their conference championship the previous season. They lost QB Peyton Manning, WR's Marcus Nash and Andy McCullough, and LB Leonard Little to the NFL. Manning was the first pick overall in the 1998 NFL draft. They were also coming off of a 42–17 loss to Nebraska in the Orange Bowl, and were in the midst of a 5-game losing streak to their rivals the Florida Gators.

However, the 1998 Tennessee Volunteers football team would prove to exceed all expectations. Led by new quarterback Tee Martin, All American linebacker Al Wilson, and Peerless Price, the Vols captured another national title and would win the first ever BCS Title game against Florida State. They finished the season 13–0, ending a remarkable run of 45–5 in 4 years. Those four seasons, the Vols were led by Fulmer, offensive coordinator David Cutcliffe, and defensive coordinator John Chavis. Cutcliffe took over at Ole Miss as a head coach following the 1998 regular season.

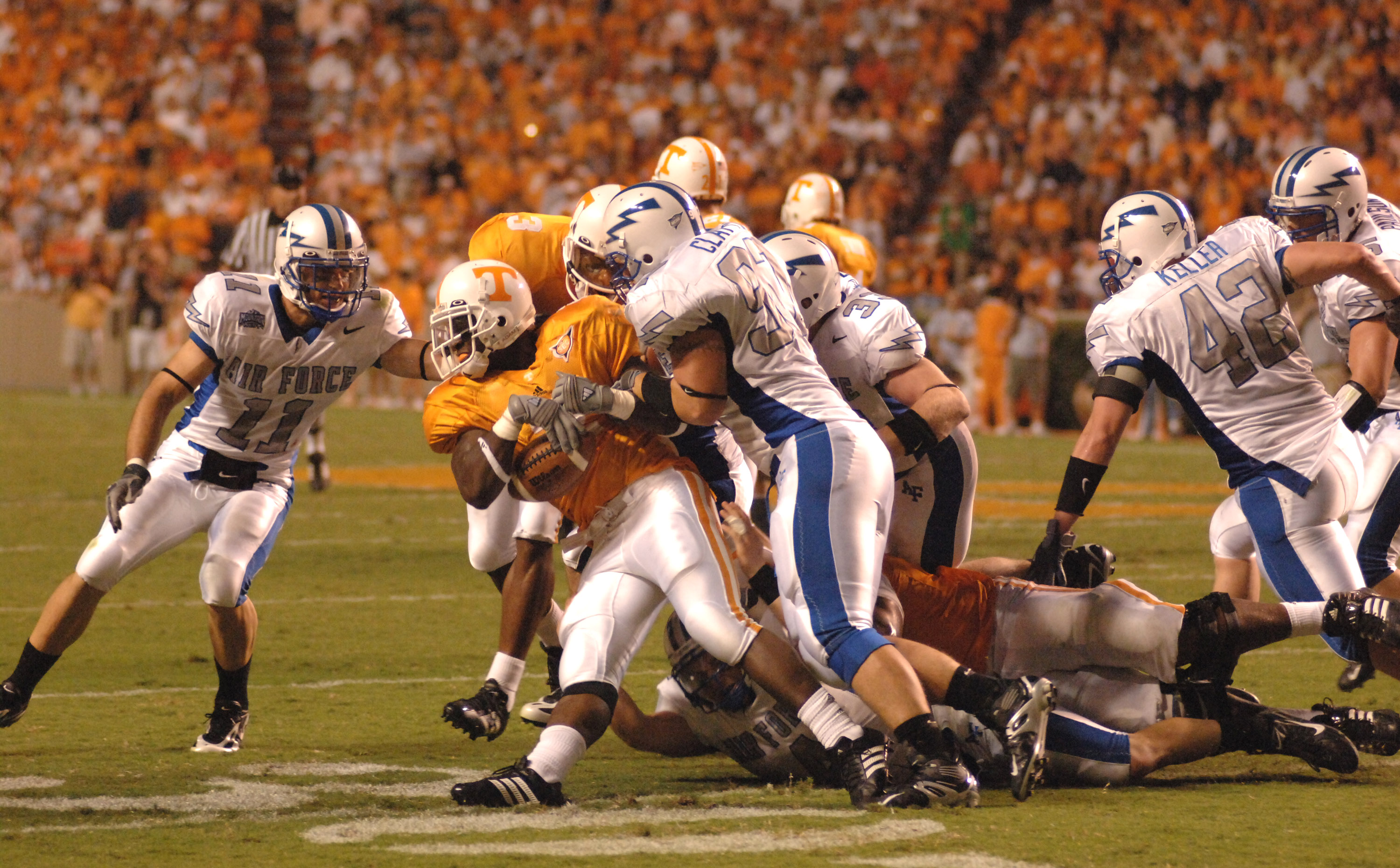
UT football, seen here at Neyland in September 2006 against Air Force, has seen various up-and-down seasons since the 1998 season.

After 1998, the Vols made three more trips to the SEC Championship Game with Fulmer as the head coach: 2001, 2004, and 2007. The 2001 team beat then head coach Steve Spurrier and Florida in the Swamp 34–32, moving them up to #2 in most polls and giving them a shot at the BCS title game in the Rose Bowl vs Miami. But they would lose to underdog #21 LSU in the SEC Championship Game. In 2005, the team suffered its first losing season since 1988, going 5–6, fielding a nationally ranked defense but an anemic offense. Cutcliffe returned to the Vols as offensive coordinator before the 2006 season, which reunited the successful group of Fulmer, Chavis, and Cutcliffe. Tennessee rebounded to go 9–3 in the 2006 regular season, losing two heartbreakers at home to Florida and LSU. This earned a spot in the 2007 Outback Bowl, where they lost to underdog Penn State, 20–10. The 2007 season was the first in team history in which the Volunteers allowed 40 or more points in more than one game (3 times). The Vols' defense did considerably better than expected with help from seniors Xavier Mitchell, Antonio Reynolds, and Jerod Mayo, and also from freshman Eric Berry. They would eventually win the SEC Eastern Division title and would go on to play eventual national champion LSU. The Vols would lose to the Tigers 21–14. After the SEC Championship, the Vols were invited to play the Wisconsin Badgers in the Outback Bowl on January 1, 2008, winning 21–17.

On January 11, 2008, it was announced that Dave Clawson had been hired as the new offensive coordinator for the Vols by head coach Phillip Fulmer. He replaced David Cutcliffe, who moved to Duke University as head coach. Jonathan Crompton started at quarterback for the first four games of the 2008 season and went 1–3, after which he was replaced by sophomore Nick Stephens. B. J. Coleman was the third quarterback on the roster. Clawson's appointment introduced problems with the Volunteer's offense, leading to one of the worst performing offenses under then-Head Coach Phillip Fulmer's career. Clawson's offense was focused primarily on the short game (strong running and short-range passing) which was in large contrast to UT's quarterbacks who spent their high school careers primarily throwing the ball deep. The Vols posted a dismal 5–7 record in the 2008 season, resulting in Fulmer's ouster at the end of the season. The athletic department had to come up with $6 million for Fulmer's total buyout, which would be paid over 48 months in equal installments. On November 3, 2008, under pressure, head coach Phillip Fulmer announced that he would be stepping down from his position at the end of the season after a winning total of 152 games at his alma mater.

=== Lane Kiffin era (2009) ===
On December 1, 2008, Lane Kiffin, former head coach of the Oakland Raiders, was announced as the 21st head coach of the Tennessee Volunteers. It was also reported that once the 2008 NFL regular season ended, Lane's father, Monte Kiffin, would join him in Knoxville. Monte would replace John Chavis as the Volunteers defensive coordinator. On December 31, 2008, it was announced that former Ole Miss head coach Ed Orgeron would become associate coach and defensive line coach as well as recruiting coordinator for the Vols. Jim Chaney was also announced as the Vols' new offensive coordinator replacing Dave Clawson, who took the head coaching job at Bowling Green. Chaney was the tight ends coach for the NFL's St. Louis Rams, and was the offensive coordinator at Purdue University under Joe Tiller.

In Lane Kiffin's only year at UT, the Vols finished the season 7–6. On February 5, 2009, Kiffin gained media attention by accusing Urban Meyer of NCAA recruiting violations at Florida. The Vols would play the Gators in the third game of the season as 30-point underdogs. UT was able to keep the game close, losing 23–13. In the sixth game of the season, the Vols played #2 Alabama. Terrence Cody blocked a 44-yard field goal attempt on the final play to give the Crimson Tide a 12–10 victory. Tennessee played #22 South Carolina the following game, which fell on Halloween night. They would win 31–13, giving Kiffin his first win over a ranked team at Tennessee. In this game, the Vols wore black and orange jerseys. It was another in a series of controversial decisions made by Kiffin; some UT alumni did not want the jerseys worn because doing so challenged tradition. However, an overwhelming majority of fans said they liked the new jerseys in a local poll. Tennessee would finish the regular season 7–5, earning an invitation to the 2009 Chick-fil-A Bowl against #11 Virginia Tech. They would lose to the Hokies 37–14.

For the 2009 season, UT paid $3.32 million to all assistant football coaches, the highest combined salary among public schools. On January 12, 2010, after just one year at Tennessee, Kiffin left to accept the head coaching job at the University of Southern California. Kiffin's abrupt departure was met with anger and backlash among a number of Tennessee fans, and rioting occurred in and around campus after word got out.

=== Derek Dooley era (2010–2012) ===
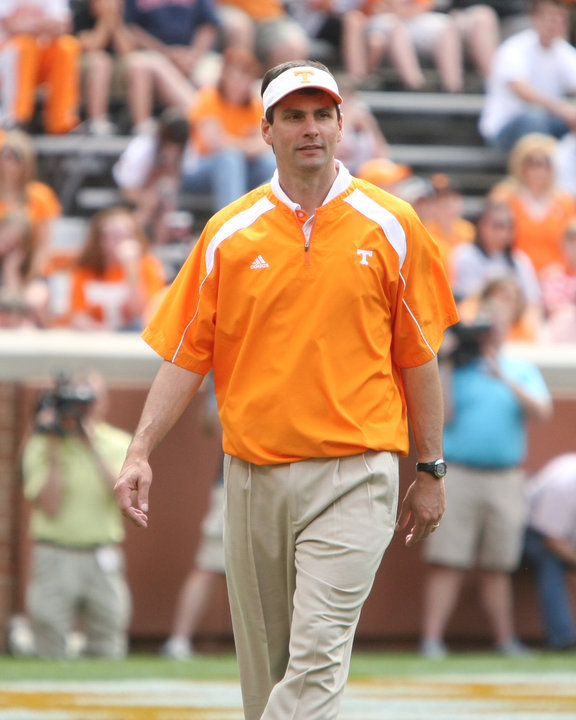
Coach Dooley

On January 15, 2010, Louisiana Tech head coach Derek Dooley, son of legendary Georgia head coach Vince Dooley, was named the Volunteers' 22nd head coach, replacing Lane Kiffin. Expectations for the Vols entering 2010 were relatively low in part because of having a third head coach in two years, a young and lacking offensive line, and an unresolved QB issue just weeks before the season began. Junior QB Matt Simms, son of Pro Bowl and former Super Bowl MVP Phil Simms, was named starter for the Vols for the opener against UT-Martin. After eight games the Vols were 2–6, including a heartbreaking loss at LSU which ended in controversy.

After Tennessee was soundly beaten by South Carolina 38–24, Dooley named true freshman QB Tyler Bray as starter for the next game against Memphis. The Vols found new life in their new QB. Bray threw for 325 yards and 5 touchdowns. The Vols would make a remarkable stand throughout November, going 4–0 to reach 6–6 overall and become bowl eligible. On December 30 the Vols faced North Carolina in the Music City Bowl, which ended similarly to UT's previous game with LSU. A loophole in the rules (a lack of a late game 10-second runoff) gave the Tar Heels one more second in regulation in which they would kick a field goal to tie the game at 20–20 and send it into overtime. After both teams scored touchdowns in the first overtime, Bray would throw an interception on UT's first possession in the second overtime. UNC would cap it off by kicking a field goal to win the game 30–27. Overall, the Vols and Dooley would finish 6–7. The aftermath of UT's bowl loss to UNC resulted in the NCAA applying the same rule as the NFL when it comes to too many players on the field as time expires.

In 2011, the Vols had another losing season at 5–7. The Vols escaped sanctions in connection to an earlier scandal involving Kiffin during his coaching tenure at Tennessee (apart from minor sanctions they had imposed on themselves). Kiffin was also cleared by the NCAA. On November 18, 2012, Dooley was fired after losing 41–18 to Vanderbilt. The team finished the season at 5–7 for the second consecutive season.

=== Butch Jones era (2013–2017) ===
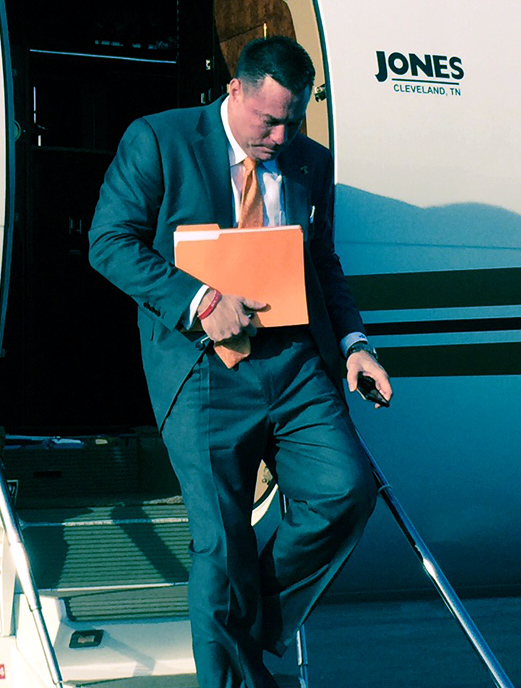
Coach Jones

On December 7, 2012, Butch Jones left Cincinnati and became the 23rd head coach of the Vols. In his inaugural season at UT, Jones stressed the importance of rebuilding the football program itself, as well as the culture at Tennessee, and providing much-needed coaching stability for the Vols. Jones also reiterated the significance to the team, UT, and the legions of fans of leading the Volunteers to their first winning season since 2009 and getting and winning a postseason bowl berth for the first time since 2010 and 2007, respectively. Jones led the Vols to a 23–21 win over #11 South Carolina on October 19, 2013, on a last-second field goal by Michael Palardy, marking the first time that the team won over a ranked team since 2009 and a team ranked in the top 15 since 2007, when they beat the then-ranked #15 Gamecocks 27–24. The team completed the season at a yet another losing season with a 5–7.

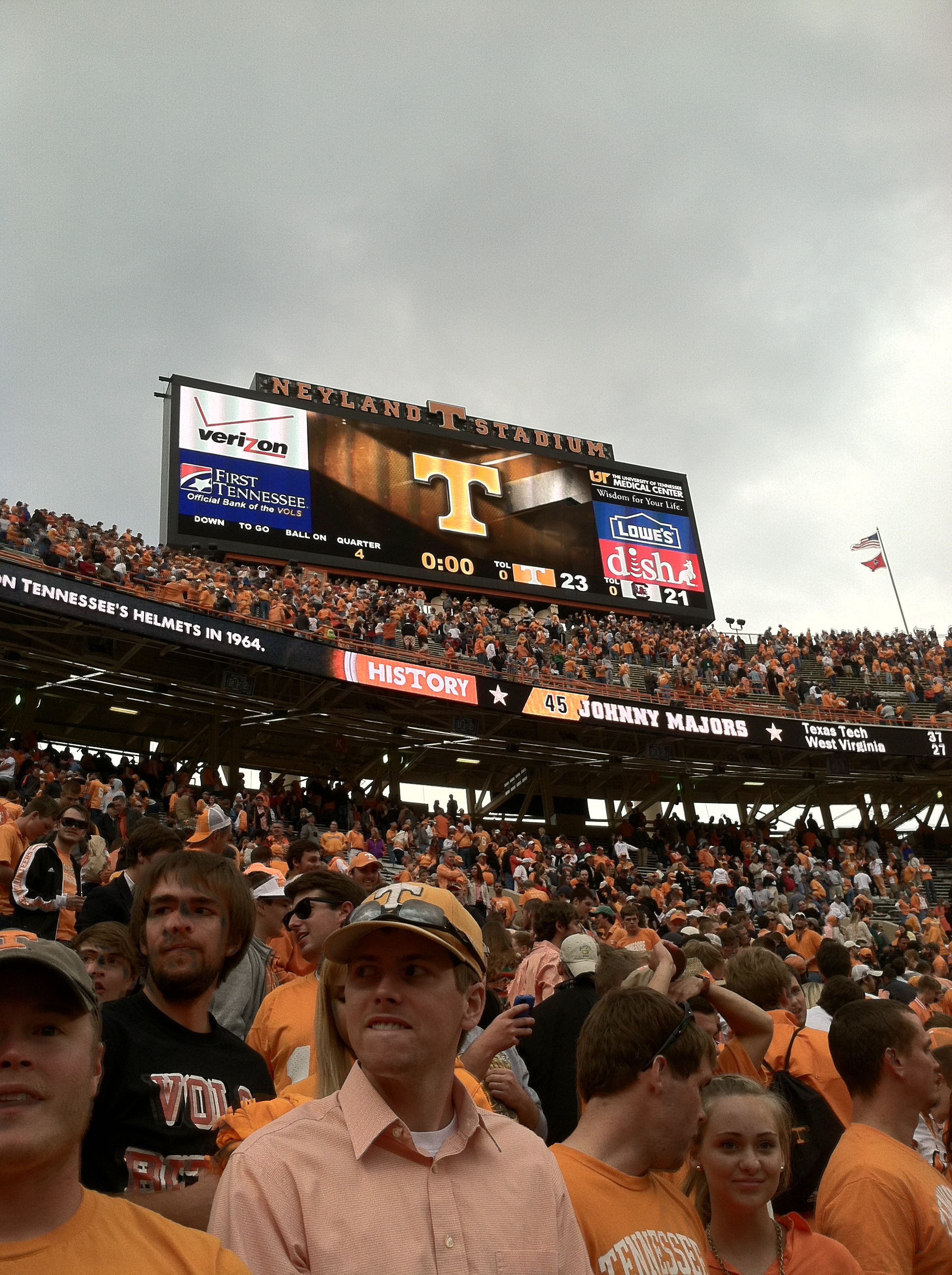
Tennessee defeats #11 South Carolina 23–21 in October 2013, making it the first time that the Vols won over a ranked team since 2009 and a team ranked in the top 15 since 2007.

In 2014, UT began the season with wins over Utah State (38–7) and Arkansas State (34–19). The next 6 games saw the Vols losing to four top-12 opponents, and to unranked Florida, when Vol fans "Checkered Neyland" Orange and White for the first time. The Vols then finished the regular season strong, starting when Joshua Dobbs replaced the injured Justin Worley as QB and led the team back from a 14-point deficit at South Carolina with roughly 5 minutes left in regulation. The Vols went on to win 45–42 in overtime. Dobbs was then named the starting quarterback, and led the Vols on to two more wins, and a close loss to Missouri. The Vols earned their first bowl game appearance since 2010, finishing the season 6–6. UT announced they would play in the TaxSlayer Bowl, formerly known as the Gator Bowl, in Jacksonville, Florida against Iowa. The game was played on January 2, and was UT's first January bowl game since 2007. In Jacksonville, the Vols struck quickly and never looked back, beating the Hawkeyes 45–28, and marking the Vols' first winning season since 2009. With the win, UT also secured its first bowl win since 2007. In February, the Vols secured a top-5 recruiting class, and their second consecutive top-10.

2015 brought high hopes from the start after the strong finish in 2014. The Vols started off strong with a 59–30 win over Bowling Green. Next, the Vol faithful "Checkered Neyland" for a second time against #19 Oklahoma. The Vols gave up a 14-point 4th quarter lead and eventually lost in 2OT, 31–24. After a 55–10 victory against Western Carolina in which the Vols returned both a Kick and a Punt for touchdowns, the Vols traveled to The Swamp to play Florida. Late game collapse was the story yet again, as a debatable coaching decision was made when the Vols scored a touchdown up 20–14 and did not go for the 2-pt conversion. The Vols later allowed a crucial 59-yard 4th down touchdown pass play with less than 2 minutes remaining. The Vols were able to drive down to attempt a 55-yard FG, but missed left by inches, losing 28–27. The loss would be the Vols' 11th in a row against Florida. The Vols returned home and lost to Arkansas, 20–24 despite Evan Berry returning the opening Kickoff for a touchdown. The next week, Tennessee pulled out its first win over Georgia (38–31) since 2009 and its first win over a ranked opponent since 2013. Tennessee then traveled to Tuscaloosa to face Alabama. The Vols took the lead 14–13 with 6 minutes left, but allowed a touchdown on Alabama's next drive, and could not convert on their final possession, losing 19–14. The Vols would finish out the season in convincing style, winning the rest of their games by a 175–81 margin, and finishing the season with 8 wins for the first time since 2007. UT announced that they would be facing #13 Northwestern in the Outback Bowl in Tampa, Florida at Raymond James Stadium on New Year's Day; the Vols' first appearance since 2007 and second consecutive bowl. Tennessee won the Outback Bowl in a blowout, 45–6. Jalen Hurd was selected as MVP. Tennessee ended the season on a 6–game winning streak (its first since 2003).

2016 brought the highest expectations in the Butch Jones era. With multiple starters returning on both offense and defense Tennessee was the overall favorite to win the SEC East. After surviving a scare against Appalachian St. in the season opener at home, the Vols looked much better at the long-awaited Battle at Bristol against Virginia Tech. Coming back from an early 14–0 deficit, Joshua Dobbs turned in a great performance and led Tennessee to an impressive 45–24 victory. An impressive victory would be followed with an underwhelming 28–19 win against Ohio the following week at Neyland Stadium. Tennessee could not put the Bobcats away early and the game stayed close into the 4th quarter. Nonetheless, Vol fans were eagerly anticipating a visit from the Florida Gators and ending the 11-game losing streak. The first half was terrible for Tennessee as the offense struggled to move the ball effectively and Florida had no trouble finding the end zone. At halftime the score had Florida leading Tennessee 21–3. The second half was a whole different story. Dobbs came back to life and the Volunteer offense ran all over the suddenly ineffective Gators. Five straight touchdowns put the Vols firmly in control. Jauan Jennings out-juked Gator DB Jaylen Tabor on an unforgettable streak to the end zone. Florida could never find a rhythm in the second half and Tennessee finished off the gators 38–28 bring an end to the Vols miserable losing streak to the Gators. The Vols would find more magic a week later in Athens between the hedges. A back-and-forth game seemed over when freshman Georgia QB Jacob Eason found WR Riley Ridley on a long touchdown bomb with 10 seconds left in the game to put the Bulldogs up 31–28. Misfortune followed for the Bulldogs. An unsportsmanlike penalty for excessive celebrating, a strong kickoff return from Tennessee DB Evan Berry, and another Georgia penalty put Tennessee at the Georgia 43-yard line. Dobbs dropped back and launched a prayer to the end zone. It was answered by Jennings who managed to get in front of the Georgia defenders and reel the ball in for the touchdown and the improbable victory. Tennessee was 5–0 for the first time since 1998. The hype would not last. Tennessee traveled to College Station for the first time ever a week later to take on Texas A&M. Tennessee would spend almost all of regulation trailing the Aggies but stay in striking distance. Late in the 4th quarter with A&M up 35–28 Aggie RB Trayveon Williams broke out a huge run and was destined for the end zone. Tennessee DB Malik Foreman, however, managed to catch up to Williams and strip the ball from behind him and the ball sailed out of bounds in the Volunteer end zone for a Tennessee touchback. Alvin Kamara then answered with a touchdown on the following Tennessee possession to send the game to overtime. The Vols and Aggies stayed locked up after the first OT, but Joshua Dobbs threw a bad interception in the second to seal the deal for Texas A&M. The season then unraveled next week in Knoxville with Alabama coming to town. With injuries piling up on the Vols there wasn't much to be done in a deflating 49–10 loss to the Crimson Tide. A much needed BYE week had Tennessee fans confident they could stay in race for the SEC East with a much easier second half to the season. That confidence would dashed in Columbia, SC with a gutting loss to the Gamecocks, 24–21. Dobbs was ineffective and RB Jalen Hurd couldn't get many runs going. On the Monday following the loss Hurd left the team. Hurd's departure put the microscope on Jones's program and some writers questioned the stability of the team and Jones's inability to keep players in the program. Rebounding with wins against Tennessee Tech and Kentucky, the Vols went into their game with Missouri trailing the Gators by one game in the SEC East. As the game began in Knoxville, Florida sealed the East on a goal line stand against LSU in Baton Rouge. The news at Neyland Stadium silenced the crowd. Even with the SEC East lost, Tennessee still had a chance to play in the Sugar Bowl. After handling the Tigers all Tennessee had left was a favorable trip to Nashville to take on reeling Vanderbilt. Tennessee's defensive issues hit a breaking point and the Commodore offense piled up massive yards on the Vols in a spirit-crushing 45–24 win. Tennessee finished the season with a win over Nebraska in the Music City Bowl and a 9–4 record.

In a season hoping to put the Vols back on top in the SEC it would end up having the opposite effect in the long run. Butch Jones's personality issues would begin to come to light after the Vols were eliminated from SEC title contention. In his press conference following the elimination Jones downplayed the disappointment and instead said his players were the "champions of life". Jones's ignorance of Tennessee's most coveted ambitions in championships would greatly alienate the Volunteer fan base and set Jones up on a difficult stage for 2017. The 2017 season in Tennessee football will never be forgotten among the Volunteer faithful and for all the wrong reasons. Opening with wins against old rival Georgia Tech and Indiana St., Tennessee returned to Gainesville seemingly with momentum against the Gators and hoping to erase the embarrassing choke from two years prior. In what would be a very ugly ball game, Tennessee and Florida would struggle the entire game to advance the football. Tennessee had a few chances to take control of the game but failed constantly. It would be a goal line stand that would start a downward trend for Tennessee and its season. With a 1st-and-Goal from Florida's 1-yard line, Jones inexplicably called three straight passing plays. Tennessee QB Quentin Dormady would be intercepted on the third play. Even then, Tennessee gained another opportunity with less than a minute left in the game with another series with Goal to go down 20–17. Again, Jones would not give RB John Kelly the ball despite Kelly having a tremendous 141 yard rushing day. Another three straight broken up passing plays forced Tennessee to kick a field goal to tie game. The failure to win the game there would sting the Vols on Florida's ensuing drive. Though expected to take a knee to go to overtime, the Gators instead ran a few plays to set up one last play from their own 37-yard line. QB Feleipe Franks threw a miraculous 63-yard Hail Mary to Tyrie Cleveland to give the Gators a stunning victory. The Tennessee fan base erupted in fury against Jones following the game, putting his job in jeopardy for the weeks to come. Two weeks later, following an uninspired 17–13 win over winless UMass, the Vols were shut out at Neyland Stadium for the first time in 23 years with an embarrassing 41–0 loss to the surging (and eventual playoff bound) Georgia Bulldogs. A number of sports writers surmised that Jones was sure to be fired at some point during the season. The bleeding continued with another loss to South Carolina bringing Jones's record against Will Muschamp to 0–4. Yet another blowout loss to Alabama in Tuscaloosa followed. Then the Vols lost a close 29–26 game in Lexington to the Kentucky Wildcats. It was only the second victory for the Cats against the Vols since 1985. A homecoming win over Southern Miss would brighten things up just briefly before losing to Missouri on the road, 50–17. In two games against Tennessee the Tigers gained an astonishing 1,399 yards of offense. For Tennessee athletics director John Currie, he had seen enough. Butch Jones was fired the day after the Mizzou loss. Defensive line coach Brady Hoke took over as interim coach for two more losses against LSU and Vanderbilt respectively to finally end what was the worst season in Tennessee football history. The Vols went 4–8, losing eight games in a season for the first time in the program's 121-year history.

=== Jeremy Pruitt era (2018–2020) ===
After one of the most grueling searches for a head coach seen in college football, Alabama defensive coordinator Jeremy Pruitt was named the 24th head coach of the Tennessee Volunteers on December 7, 2017. The search began with then-AD John Currie leading the way. The day after Tennessee completed its 4–8 season with a loss to Vanderbilt, Currie was on the verge of hiring former Rutgers and Buccaneers coach Greg Schiano to be head coach and both parties had even signed a memorandum of understanding. The resulting backlash from fans, sports writers, and even gubernatorial candidates in the state to this news was immensely fierce. Tennessee fans all across social media scolded Schiano for his alleged role in the Jerry Sandusky scandal when he coached at Penn State in the 90s. Though the allegations were regarded as hearsay in court testimony, writers questioned Currie's decision to bring Schiano's background to the school in light of the university's recent Title IX lawsuit settlements the year prior. Both Currie and Schiano backed out of the MOI and Currie found himself on the hot seat following the botched hire. Currie then proceeded to interview Oklahoma State head coach Mike Gundy, but was turned down. Next was Purdue coach Jeff Brohm, who agreed to a deal with Currie, but Tennessee executives nixed the agreement and Brohm turned down the reduced offer. Currie then interviewed NC State head coach Dave Doeren and yet again was turned down. Now desperate, Currie rushed out to Los Angeles, California to meet with Washington State head coach Mike Leach. Before a deal could be reached, Currie was summoned back to Knoxville by chancellor Beverly Davenport where he was subsequently fired. Phillip Fulmer took over both as acting athletic director and the coaching search on December 1. Six days later, Fulmer hired Pruitt to be the Vols new coach.

=== Josh Heupel era (2021–present) ===
On January 27, 2021, UCF head coach Josh Heupel was named the new Volunteers head coach, following athletics director Danny White from Orlando to Rocky Top. Heupel oversaw explosive offenses during his time as a head coach at UCF and as offensive coordinator at Missouri and Oklahoma and brought his offensive pedigree to UT. Heupel signed a six-year contract with UT worth $24 million excluding incentives.

On August 13, 2025, the university announced a 10-year deal with Adidas to return as the official supplier of footwear, uniforms, apparel, and sideline gear. The company had previously partnered with the university from 1995 to 2015, before Nike signed a 10-year deal of their own. The Volunteers finished the 2025 season with Nike, and the deal with Adidas went into effect prior to the 2026 season on July 1, 2026.
