= 1908 Southern Intercollegiate Athletic Association football season =

- League: NCAA
- Sport: College football
- Duration: September 26, 1908 through November 29, 1908
- Teams: 13

Regular Season
- Season champions: LSU; Auburn

Football seasons
- ← 1907 1909 →

1908 Southern Intercollegiate Athletic Association football standings
	Conf.					Overall
Team	W		L		T	W		L		T
LSU +	2	–	0	–	0	10	–	0	–	0
Auburn +	4	–	1	–	0	6	–	1	–	0
Vanderbilt	3	–	0	–	1	7	–	2	–	1
Tennessee	3	–	2	–	0	7	–	2	–	0
Georgia Tech	4	–	3	–	0	6	–	3	–	0
Georgia	2	–	2	–	1	5	–	2	–	1
Alabama	1	–	1	–	1	6	–	1	–	1
Sewanee	1	–	1	–	1	4	–	1	–	3
Mississippi A&M	1	–	3	–	0	3	–	4	–	0
Ole Miss	0	–	2	–	0	3	–	5	–	0
Mercer	0	–	3	–	0	3	–	4	–	0
Howard (AL)	0	–	3	–	0	2	–	4	–	0
Clemson	0	–	4	–	0	1	–	6	–	0
Nashville			–					–
+ – Conference co-champions

The 1908 Southern Intercollegiate Athletic Association football season was the college football games played by the member schools of the Southern Intercollegiate Athletic Association as part of the 1908 college football season. The season began on September 26.

LSU won the SIAA championship, but amidst fears of many players being ineligible under SIAA rules most sportswriters did not include them for consideration. (Note: LSU is recognized as national champions by the National Championship Foundation for this season; however, LSU does not officially recognize this season as a national championship season.) Its season was clouded by accusations of professionalism from Grantland Rice and rival school Tulane which was also undefeated in southern play. Despite this, the SIAA eventually cleared LSU of any wrongdoing. LSU featured Hall of Fame quarterback Doc Fenton.

Auburn and Vanderbilt were among those listed as alternative SIAA champions. The newspapers unanimously handed the title to Auburn. Auburn featured first-year halfback Lew Hardage. Vanderbilt had a down year with a wealth of sophomores; guided shrewdly by McGugin to its success.

The Tennessee Volunteers compiled four wins in SIAA play, the most in team history. It was widely considered the best Tennessee football season up to that point. Vanderbilt coach Dan McGugin noted "All things considered, Leach was perhaps the best football player of the year in Dixie."

== Results and team statistics ==
Conf. Rank	Team	Head coach	Overall record	Conf. record	PPG	PAG
1 (tie)	LSU	Edgar Wingard	10–0	2–0	44.3	1.1
1 (tie)	Auburn	Mike Donahue	6–1	5–1	22.6	1.4
3	Vanderbilt	Dan McGugin	7–2–1	3–0–1	20.7	6.1
4	Tennessee	George Levene	7–2	3–2	13.8	3.9
5	Georgia Tech	John Heisman	6–3	4–3	16.3	8.2
6	Georgia	Branch Bocock	5–3–1	2–2–1	9.0	5.6
7 (tie)	Alabama	Doc Pollard	6–1–1	1–1–1	13.5	3.9
7 (tie)	Sewanee	Harry Van Surdam	4–1–3	1–1–1	11.8	2.5
9	Mississippi A&M	Fred Furman	3–4	1–3	15.4	16.1
10	Mississippi	Frank Kyle	3–5	0–2	12.4	15.6
11	Mercer	Frank Blake	3–4	0–3	18.7	8.4
12	Howard	John Counselman	2–4	0–3		
12	Clemson	Stein Stone	1–6	0–4	3.7	14.9
13	Nashville					

Key

PPG = Average of points scored per game
PAG = Average of points allowed per game

== Regular season ==
Index to colors and formatting
Non-conference matchup; SIAA member won
Non-conference matchup; SIAA member lost
Non-conference matchup; tie
Conference matchup

SIAA teams in bold.

=== Week One ===
Date	Visiting team	Home team	Site	Result	Attendance	Reference
September 26	Gordon	**Clemson**	Bowman Field • Calhoun, SC	**W** 15–0		
September 26	Southwestern Presbyterian	**Vanderbilt**	Dudley Field • Nashville, TN	**W** 11–5		

=== Week Two ===
Date	Visiting team	Home team	Site	Result	Attendance	Reference
October 3	Memphis University School	Ole Miss	Oxford, MS	**W** 30–0		
October 3	Mooney	Sewanee	Hardee Field • Sewanee, TN	**W** 29–0		
October 3	Wetumpka Agricultural School	Alabama	The Quad • Tuscaloosa, AL	**W** 27–0		
October 3	Howard (AL)	Auburn	West End Park • Birmingham, AL	**W** 18–0		
October 3	North Georgia	Georgia	Herty Field • Athens, GA	**W** 16–0		
October 3	Gordon	Georgia Tech	Ponce de Leon Park • Atlanta, GA	**W** 32–0		
October 3	Locust Grove Institute	Mercer	Central City Park • Macon, GA	**W** 56–0		
October 3	North Carolina	Tennessee	Waite Field • Knoxville, TN	**W** 12–0		
October 3	New Orleans Gym Club	LSU	State Field • Baton Rouge, LA	**W** 41–0		
October 3	Maryville (TN)	Vanderbilt	Dudley Field • Nashville, TN	**W** 32–0		

=== Week Three ===
Date	Visiting team	Home team	Site	Result	Attendance	Reference
October 10	Howard (AL)	**Alabama**	West End Park • Birmingham, AL	**W** 17–0		
October 10	Gordon	**Auburn**	Drill Field • Auburn, AL	**W** 42–0		
October 10	Castle Heights	**Sewanee**	Hardee Field • Sewanee, TN	**W** 35–2		
October 10	Florida	**Mercer**	Central City Park • Macon, GA	**W** 24–0		
October 10	Louisiana Industrial	**Mississippi A&M**	Hardy Field • Starkville, MS	**W** 47–0		
October 10	**Ole Miss**	Arkansas	The Hill • Fayetteville, AR	**L** 33–0		
October 10	Mooney	**Georgia Tech**	Ponce de Leon Park • Atlanta, GA	**W** 30–0		
October 10	Maryville (TN)	**Tennessee**	Waite Field • Knoxville, TN	**W** 39–5		
October 10	VPI	**Clemson**	Bowman Field • Calhoun, SC	**L** 6–0		
October 10	Rose Polytechnic	**Vanderbilt**	Dudley Field • Nashville, TN	**W** 32–0		
October 11	Jackson Barracks-New Orleans	**LSU**	State Field • Baton Rouge, LA	**W** 81–5	1,000	

=== Week Four ===
Date	Visiting team	Home team	Site	Result	Attendance	Reference
October 17	**Auburn**	**Mercer**	Central City Park • Macon, GA	**AUB** 23–0		
October 17	Cincinnati	**Alabama**	State Fairgrounds • Birmingham, AL	**W** 16–0		
October 17	**Mississippi A&M**	**Georgia Tech**	Ponce de Leon Park • Atlanta, GA	**GT** 23–0		
October 17	South Carolina	**Georgia**	Herty Field • Athens, GA	**W** 29–6		
October 17	**Sewanee**	Virginia	Lafayette Field • Norfolk, VA	**T** 0–0	5,000	
October 17	Texas A&M	**LSU**	Pelican Park • New Orleans, LA	**W** 26–0		
October 17	Kentucky State College	**Tennessee**	Waite Field • Knoxville, TN	**W** 7–0		
October 17	**Clemson**	**Vanderbilt**	Dudley Field • Nashville, TN	**VAN** 41–0		
October 17	Cape Girardeau Normal	**Ole Miss**	Edgewood Park • Memphis, TN	**W** 17–0		

=== Week Five ===
Date	Time	Visiting team	Home team	Site	Result	Attendance	Reference
October 23		Southwestern Presbyterian	Mississippi A&M	Columbus Fairgrounds • Columbus, MS	**W** 6–0	4,000	
October 24	12:00 p. m.	**Sewanee**	Auburn	West End Park • Birmingham, AL	**AUB** 6–0	3,000	
October 24		**Georgia**	Tennessee	Waite Field • Knoxville, TN	**TENN** 10–0		
October 24		**Alabama**	Georgia Tech	Ponce de Leon Park • Atlanta, GA	**GT** 11–6		
October 24		**Ole Miss**	Vanderbilt	Dudley Field • Nashville, TN	**VAN** 29–0		
October 26		Southwestern Presbyterian	LSU	State Field • Baton Rouge, LA	**W** 55–0		

=== Week Six ===
Date	Visiting team	Home team	Site	Result	Attendance	Reference
October 28	Davidson	**Clemson**	State Fair Grounds • Columbia, SC	**L** 0–13		
October 29	Mississippi College	**Ole Miss**	State Fairgrounds • Jackson, MS	**W** 41–0		
October 31	Chattanooga	**Alabama**	The Quad • Tuscaloosa, AL	**W** 23–6		
October 31	**Georgis**	**Mercer**	Central City Park • Macon, GA	**UGA** 11–0		
October 31	**LSU**	**Auburn**	Drill Field • Auburn, AL	**LSU** 10–2		
October 31	**Vanderbilt**	Michigan	Ann Arbor, MI	**L** 6–24		
October 31	Kentucky University	**Mississippi A&M**	Hardy Field • Starkville, MS	**W** 12–5		
October 31	**Sewanee**	Kentucky State College	State Athletic Field • Lexington, KY	**W** 12–0		
October 31	**Tennessee**	**Georgia Tech**	Ponce de Leon Park • Atlanta, GA	**TENN** 6–5		
October 31	**Ole Miss**	Tulane	Pelican Park • New Orleans, LA	**L** 0–10		

=== Week Seven ===
Date	Visiting team	Home team	Site	Result	Attendance	Reference
November 5	**Clemson**	**Georgia**	Augusta, GA	**UGA** 8–0		
November 7	**Auburn**	**Georgia Tech**	Ponce de Leon Park • Atlanta, GA	**AUB** 44–0		
November 7	**Mississippi A&M**	**LSU**	State Field • Baton Rouge, LA	**LSU** 50–0		
November 7	**Sewanee**	Saint Louis	Sportsman's Park • St. Louis, MO	**T** 6–6		
November 7	**Tennessee**	**Vanderbilt**	Dudley Field • Nashville, TN	**VAN** 16–9		

=== Week Eight ===
Date	Visiting team	Home team	Site	Result	Attendance	Reference
November 10	Baylor	**LSU**	State Field • Baton Rouge, LA	**W** 89–0		
November 10	Southwestern Presbyterian	**Ole Miss**	Oxford, MS	**L** 5–9		
November 14	**Georgia**	**Alabama**	State Fairgrounds • Birmingham, AL	**T** 6–6		
November 14	**Sewanee**	**Georgia Tech**	Ponce de Leon Park • Atlanta, GA	**SEW** 6–0		
November 14	**Mississippi A&M**	Tulane	Pelican Park • New Orleans, LA	**L** 23–0		
November 14	Ohio State	**Vanderbilt**	Dudley Field • Nashville, TN	**L** 6–17		
November 14	**Clemson**	**Tennessee**	Waite Field • Knoxville, TN	**TENN** 6–5		
November 16	Haskell	**LSU**	Pelican Park • New Orleans, LA	**W** 33–0		

=== Week Nine ===
Date	Visiting team	Home team	Site	Result	Attendance	Reference
November 17	**Mercer**	The Citadel	Charleston, SC	**L**5–10		
November 19	**Georgia Tech**	**Mercer**	Central City Park • Macon, GA	**GT** 16–6		
November 20	Haskell	**Alabama**	The Quad • Tuscaloosa, AL	**W** 9–8		
November 21	Davidson	**Georgia**	Herty Field • Athens, GA	**W** 2–0		
November 21	Chattanooga	**Tennessee**	Waite Field • Knoxville, TN	**W** 35–0		
November 21	**Vanderbilt**	Washington University	Francis Field • St. Louis, MO	**W** 28–0	6,000	
November 23	**LSU**	Louisiana Industrial	Ruston, LA	**W** 22–0		

=== Week Ten ===
Date	Visiting team	Home team	Site	Result	Attendance	Reference
November 26	**Tennessee**	**Alabama**	State Fairgrounds • Birmingham, AL	**ALA** 4–0		
November 26	**Clemson**	**Georgia Tech**	Ponce de Leon Park • Atlanta, GA	**GT** 30–6		
November 26	**Georgia**	**Auburn**	Montgomery Baseball Park • Montgomery, AL	**AUB** 23–0		
November 26	**LSU**	Arkansas	West End Park • Little Rock, AR	**W** 36–4	5,000	
November 26	Howard (AL)	**Mercer**	Central City Park • Macon, Georgia	**W** 45–0		
November 26	**Ole Miss**	**Mississippi A&M**	State Fairgrounds • Jackson, MS	**MSA&M** 44–6		
November 26	**Sewanee**	**Vanderbilt**	Dudley Field • Nashville, TN	**T** 6–6		

== Awards and honors ==
=== All-Southern team ===
The consensus All-Southern team:

Position	Name	First-team Selectors	Team
QB	Ray Morrison	NB	Vanderbilt
HB	Walker Leach	H, DM, NB	Tennessee
HB	Lew Hardage	DM	Auburn
FB	Lawrence Markley	H, DM, NB	Sewanee
E	Vaughn Blake	H, DM, NB	Vanderbilt
T	Frank Faulkinberry	H, DM, NB	Sewanee
G	Louis Hasslock	H, DM, NB	Vanderbilt
C	C. C. Countess		Alabama
G	James L. Harris		Sewanee
T	J. R. Davis	H, DM	Georgia Tech
E	Walker Reynolds		Auburn

Selectors include John Heisman (H), Dan McGugin (DM), and Nash Buckingham (NB).
