= Harry Van Surdam =

American football player, coach, musician, composer, bandleader and superintendent

Biographical details
- Born: August 28, 1881; Hoosick Falls, New York, U.S.
- Died: May 28, 1982 (aged 100); Hoosick Falls, New York, U.S.

Playing career
- 1902–1905: Wesleyan
- Position: Quarterback

Coaching career (HC unless noted)
- 1906–1907: Marietta
- 1908: Sewanee
- 1920: Texas Mines

Head coaching record
- Overall: 22–8–3
- College Football Hall of Fame; Inducted in 1972 (profile)

Henderson Edmund "Harry" "Dutch" 'Van Surdam (September 28, 1881 – May 28, 1982) was an American football player, coach, and official, musician, composer, bandleader, and superintendent of the El Paso Military Institute.

Van Surdam played college football at Wesleyan University from 1902 to 1905. Van Surdam then served as the head football coach at Marietta College in 1906 and 1907, at Sewanee in 1908, at the El Paso Military Institute from 1909 to 1912, and at the Texas School of Mines (now known as the University of Texas at El Paso) in 1920, compiling a career record of 22–8–3. He was elected to the College Football Hall of Fame in 1972.

== Early years ==
Van Surdam was born in 1881 in Hoosick Falls, a village in upstate New York. His father was a bandleader, and Harry began playing with his father's band at age 12. After graduating from high school in 1898, Van Surdam attended the Michigan Military Academy on a music scholarship. He also played clarinet with the Detroit City Band in 1901.

He next received a music scholarship at Wesleyan University in Connecticut and enrolled there in the fall of 1901. He played football at Wesleyan under head coach Howard R. Reiter who has been credited by some with the development of the overhand spiral forward pass. Van Surdam played halfback and end on Reiter's 1903 team and was the quarterback of the 1904 and 1905 teams. As a senior in 1904, he was selected as an All-New England quarterback. He returned to Wesleyan in the fall of 1905 for post-graduate study in chemistry, and he led the 1905 Wesleyan football team to a 7–2–1 record. Van Surdam was also a member of the school's track team and glee club. At Wesleyan, he joined Delta Kappa Epsilon fraternity.

Van Surdam worked in 1906 as a metallurgical chemist for Westinghouse Laboratories in New York City and taught at the Choate School in Connecticut in 1907.

== Coaching career ==
=== Marietta ===
Van Surdam was the head coach of the football team at Marietta College in Ohio for the 1906 and 1907 seasons. Van Surdam's 1906 Marietta team compiled a 9–1 record, and his 1907 team went 7–2. Coaching at a small school, he made do with only 13 players and no assistant coaches. He later recalled: "I remember my team in Marietta had 13 men. It was rough on them when we had to play two games in two days. My pay there was $400 a year and there were no assistants or scouts to help."

The forward pass became legal in 1906, and Van Surdam was credited with being one of the first coaches to incorporate the new tactic during the 1906 season at Marietta. On November 29, 1906, Marietta's Petey Gilman threw a 52-yard pass that stood as the longest forward pass in college football until 1920. Van Surdam later described the play:

The passer had to stand back five yards and you could only throw flat passes. Throwing down the middle was still illegal. We had a tailback standing 12 yards back with two blockers in front of him. The quarterback took the direct snap from center -- paused briefly -- and then passed back to the tailback. Meanwhile the left end was streaking down the field. The ball was pumpkin-shaped and you had to sling it side arm, but you could get the job done.

He recalled the reaction to the play: "When we threw it, the other team was dumbfounded. So were the referees. They were so confused they let it stand.

=== Sewanee ===
In 1908, Van Surdam coached the 1908 Sewanee Tigers football team to a 4–1–3 record. Sewanee was one of the major powers in the early years of Southern football, and Van Surdam's 1908 team defeated Georgia Tech (coached by John Heisman), played Vanderbilt (coached by Dan McGugin) to a 6–6 tie, and suffered its only loss in a close game with Auburn. At Sewanee, Van Surdam became friends with Grantland Rice with whom he later composed songs – Rice composing the lyrics and Van Surdam the music.

=== El Paso Military Institute ===
In 1908, after finishing the football season at Sewanee, Van Surdam was hired as an instructor at the El Paso Military Institute in El Paso, Texas. He developed the football program at the Institute and coached the team. Though he was in his later 20s, Van Surdam also played on occasion for the Institute's football team. He played quarterback for the 1909 Institute team that shut out New Mexico, 11-0, in 1909. With respect to his eligibility to participate as a player, he later explained: "There was no NCAA west of the Pecos."

In 1910, Van Surdam became the superintendent of the institute. Van Surdam later recalled that he had taken time off from the institute to pursue Pancho Villa after his 1913–1914 campaign into Ciudad Juárez, across the river from El Paso. When Van Surdam returned to El Paso, the Institute had been closed, and he was out of work. (In 1914, the Institute ceased operation, and its campus became the Texas School of Mines, later renamed the University of Texas at El Paso.)

=== Texas School of Mines ===
Van Surdam returned to coaching in 1920 as the head football coach at the Texas School of Mines. He led the 1920 Miners to a 2–4 record. The season began with losses to Arizona (7-60), New Mexico (0-78), and New Mexico A&M (7–12) and ended with victories over the Base Hospital (28–0) and Aviation Corps (3–0).

== Music career and later years ==
Van Surdam also worked as a musician and composer for many years, beginning as a player in his father's band at age 12. He played with the Military Military Institute band and the Detroit city band in the early 1900s. He played for the Tent City Band in Coronado, California, from 1906 to 1909 and was the director of the El Paso City Band from 1910 to 1917. He organized an orchestra that conducted a world tour from 1923 to 1924 and also organized the El Paso Symphony Orchestra. He also organized and directed an orchestra at the Hotel Statler in Buffalo for two years. He also composed many songs, including songs about football.

Van Surdam also worked officiating football games for 40 years, ending with the 1962 Army-Navy game.

In 1972, Van Surdam was selected for the pioneer gallery in the College Football Hall of Fame.

In May 1982, Van Surdam died at age 100 at the Hoosick Falls Health Center.

== Head coaching record ==
Year	Team	Overall	Conference	Standing	Bowl/playoffs
Marietta Pioneers () (1906–1907)
1906	Marietta	9–1			
1907	Marietta	7–2			
Marietta:		16–3			
Sewanee Tigers (Southern Intercollegiate Athletic Association) (1908)
1908	Sewanee	4–1–3	1–1–1	T–7th	
Sewanee:		4–1–3	1–1–1		
Texas Mines Miners (Independent) (1920)
1920	Texas Mines	2–4			
Texas Mines:		2–4			
Total:		22–8–3			
