= George Sparkman =

George Sparkman may refer to:

- George B. Sparkman (1855–1896), mayor of the city of Tampa, Florida
- George B. Sparkman Jr. (1886–1924), American football player and coach
