= George B. Sparkman Jr. =

American football player and coach (1886–1924)

George B. Sparkman
Biographical details
- Born: January 31, 1886; Tampa, Florida, U.S.
- Died: July 7, 1924 (aged 38); Miami, Florida, U.S.

Playing career
- 1908: Auburn
- Position: End/Halfback

Coaching career (HC unless noted)
- ?: Hillsborough High School
- 1919: Florida (assistant)
- 1923: Hillsborough High School

George Bascom Sparkman Jr. (January 31, 1886 – July 7, 1924) was an American football player and coach, once a key figure in Florida athletics. Sparkman played and later coached at Hillsborough High School in Tampa, posting wins over rival St. Pete. Among his pupils at Hillsborough High were Dutch Stanley and Speedy Walker. Sparkman assisted the 1919 Florida Gators football team. He played for coach Mike Donahue's Auburn Tigers football team in 1908. He possibly saved a touchdown by recovering a fumble against Sewanee at the 2-yard line. He also ran for a 65-yard touchdown against Georgia Tech. Sparkman died at the age of just 38 of tetanus.

== Early years ==
George Bascom Sparkman Jr. was born to George Sr., an attorney and mayor of Tampa, and Mary Elizabeth Kershaw on January 31, 1886. He married Pearl Luther of Albertville, Alabama.
