= 1908 Clemson Tigers football team =

American college football season

1908 Clemson Tigers football
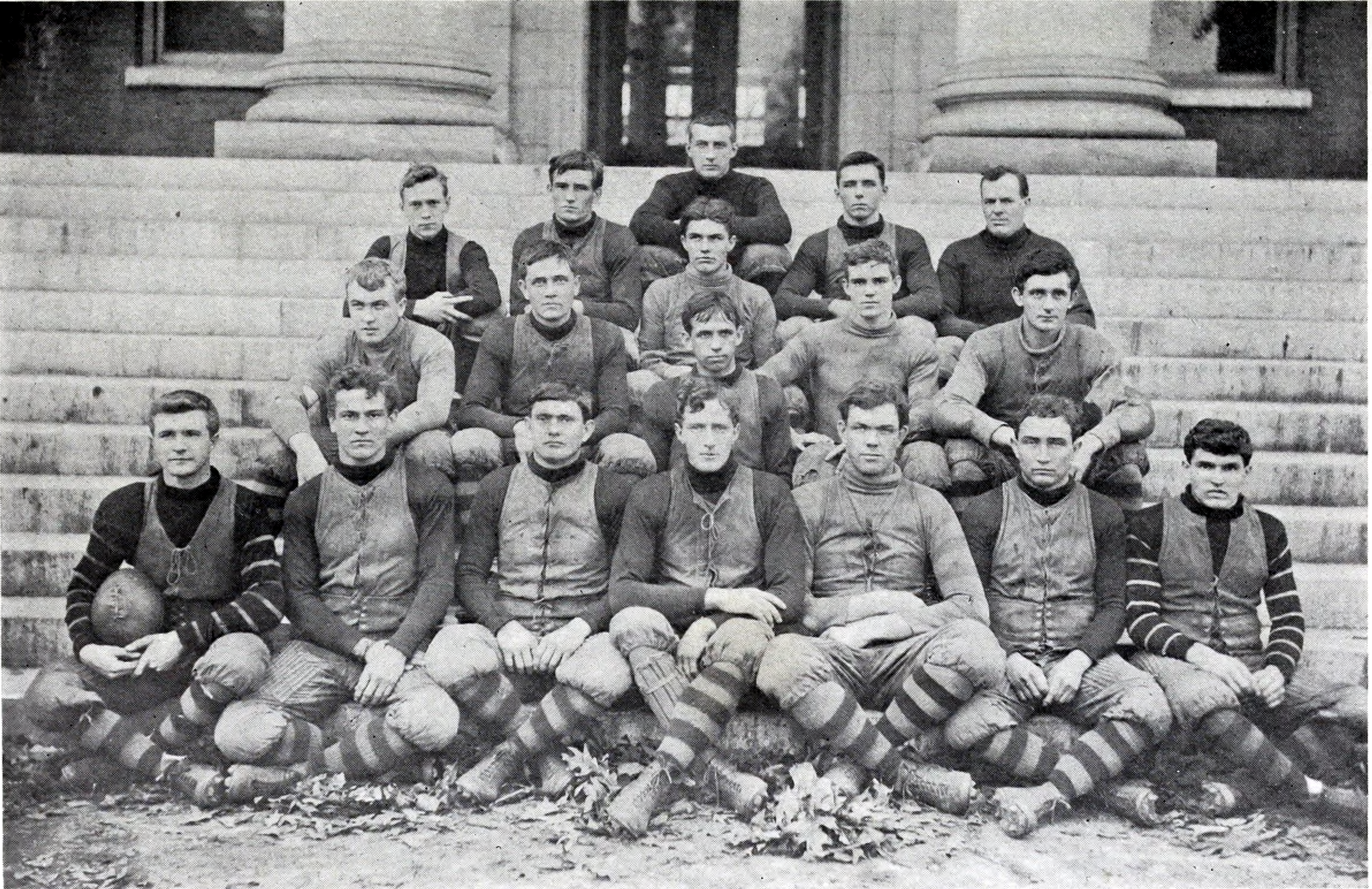
- Conference: Southern Intercollegiate Athletic Association
- Record: 1–6 (0–4 SIAA)
- Head coach: Stein Stone (1st season)
- Captain: Stricker Coles
- Home stadium: Bowman Field

1908 Southern Intercollegiate Athletic Association football standings
	Conf.					Overall
Team	W		L		T	W		L		T
LSU +	2	–	0	–	0	10	–	0	–	0
Auburn +	4	–	1	–	0	6	–	1	–	0
Vanderbilt	3	–	0	–	1	7	–	2	–	1
Tennessee	3	–	2	–	0	7	–	2	–	0
Georgia Tech	4	–	3	–	0	6	–	3	–	0
Georgia	2	–	2	–	1	5	–	2	–	1
Alabama	1	–	1	–	1	6	–	1	–	1
Sewanee	1	–	1	–	1	4	–	1	–	3
Mississippi A&M	1	–	3	–	0	3	–	4	–	0
Ole Miss	0	–	2	–	0	3	–	5	–	0
Mercer	0	–	3	–	0	3	–	4	–	0
Howard (AL)	0	–	3	–	0	2	–	4	–	0
Clemson	0	–	4	–	0	1	–	6	–	0
Nashville			–					–
+ – Conference co-champions

The 1908 Clemson Tigers football team represented Clemson Agricultural College—now known as Clemson University—as a member of the Southern Intercollegiate Athletic Association (SIAA) during the 1908 college football season. Led by Stein Stone in his first and only season as head coach, the team posted an overall record of 1–6 with a mark of 0–4 in SIAA play. Stricker Coles was the team captain.

== Schedule ==
Date	Opponent	Site	Result	Source
September 26	Gordon*	Bowman Field; Calhoun, SC	W 15–0	
October 10	VPI*	Bowman Field; Calhoun, SC	L 0–6	
October 17	at Vanderbilt	Dudley Field; Nashville, TN	L 0–41	
October 28	vs. Davidson*	State Fair Grounds; Columbia, SC	L 2–13	
November 5	vs. Georgia	Augusta, GA (rivalry)	L 0–6	
November 14	at Tennessee	Waite Field; Knoxville, TN	L 5–6	
November 26	at Georgia Tech	Ponce de Leon Park; Atlanta, GA (rivalry)	L 6–30	
*Non-conference game

== Bibliography ==
- Bourret, Tim. "2010 Clemson Football Media Guide" (PDF). Clemson University. p. 202. Archived (PDF) from the original on November 12, 2012.
