= 1908 Ole Miss Rebels football team =

American college football season

1908 Ole Miss Rebels football
- Conference: Southern Intercollegiate Athletic Association
- Record: 3–5 (0–2 SIAA)
- Head coach: Frank Kyle (1st season)
- Captain: Ike Knox

1908 Southern Intercollegiate Athletic Association football standings
| | Conf. | | | | | Overall |
| Team | W | | L | | T | W | | L | | T |
|---|---|---|---|---|---|---|---|---|---|---|
| LSU + | 2 | – | 0 | – | 0 | 10 | – | 0 | – | 0 |
| Auburn + | 4 | – | 1 | – | 0 | 6 | – | 1 | – | 0 |
| Vanderbilt | 3 | – | 0 | – | 1 | 7 | – | 2 | – | 1 |
| Tennessee | 3 | – | 2 | – | 0 | 7 | – | 2 | – | 0 |
| Georgia Tech | 4 | – | 3 | – | 0 | 6 | – | 3 | – | 0 |
| Georgia | 2 | – | 2 | – | 1 | 5 | – | 2 | – | 1 |
| Alabama | 1 | – | 1 | – | 1 | 6 | – | 1 | – | 1 |
| Sewanee | 1 | – | 1 | – | 1 | 4 | – | 1 | – | 3 |
| Mississippi A&M | 1 | – | 3 | – | 0 | 3 | – | 4 | – | 0 |
| Ole Miss | 0 | – | 2 | – | 0 | 3 | – | 5 | – | 0 |
| Mercer | 0 | – | 3 | – | 0 | 3 | – | 4 | – | 0 |
| Howard (AL) | 0 | – | 3 | – | 0 | 2 | – | 4 | – | 0 |
| Clemson | 0 | – | 4 | – | 0 | 1 | – | 6 | – | 0 |
| Nashville | | | – | | | | | – |
+ – Conference co-champions

The 1908 Ole Miss Rebels football team represented the University of Mississippi during the 1908 college football season.

Commenting on the game between Vanderbilt and Ole Miss which he officiated, Grantland Rice called captain Ike Knox, "a sensation in light hair, broad shoulders and stocky frame that gave both the Commodore offense and defense a shock that will not soon be forgotten." Rice continued: "Time and again, as a Commodore back would start down the field, the gorilla-like arms of the demon Knox would encircle his frame and said runner wasn’t only checked, but more often still, literally hurled yards towards his own goal line." In another article Rice wrote that only the mediocrity of his team kept Knox from being regionally and nationally famous: "If Knox has been upon a Vanderbilt, Sewanee or Auburn eleven he would more than likely have been hailed as one of the greatest halfbacks of the decade."

== Schedule ==
| Date | Time | Opponent | Site | Result | Source |
|---|---|---|---|---|---|
| October 3 | | Memphis University School* | Oxford, MS | W 30–0 | |
| October 10 | | at Arkansas* | The Hill; Fayetteville, AR (rivalry) | L 0–33 | |
| October 17 | 3:00 p.m. | vs. Cape Girardeau Normal* | Edgewood Park; Memphis, TN | W 17–0 | |
| October 24 | | at Vanderbilt | Dudley Field; Nashville, TN (rivalry) | L 0–29 | |
| October 29 | | at Mississippi College* | State Fairgrounds; Jackson, MS | W 41–0 | |
| October 31 | | at Tulane* | Pelican Park; New Orleans, LA (rivalry) | L 0–10 | |
| November 10 | | Southwestern Presbyterian* | Oxford, MS | L 5–9 | |
| November 26 | | vs. Mississippi A&M | Jackson, MS (rivalry) | L 6–44 | |
*Non-conference game; All times are in Central time
