= 1908 Mercer Baptists football team =

American college football season

1908 Mercer Baptists football
- Conference: Southern Intercollegiate Athletic Association
- Record: 3–4 (0–3 SIAA)
- Head coach: Frank Blake (1st season)
- Home stadium: Central City Park

1908 Southern Intercollegiate Athletic Association football standings
	Conf.					Overall
Team	W		L		T	W		L		T
LSU +	2	–	0	–	0	10	–	0	–	0
Auburn +	4	–	1	–	0	6	–	1	–	0
Vanderbilt	3	–	0	–	1	7	–	2	–	1
Tennessee	3	–	2	–	0	7	–	2	–	0
Georgia Tech	4	–	3	–	0	6	–	3	–	0
Georgia	2	–	2	–	1	5	–	2	–	1
Alabama	1	–	1	–	1	6	–	1	–	1
Sewanee	1	–	1	–	1	4	–	1	–	3
Mississippi A&M	1	–	3	–	0	3	–	4	–	0
Ole Miss	0	–	2	–	0	3	–	5	–	0
Mercer	0	–	3	–	0	3	–	4	–	0
Howard (AL)	0	–	3	–	0	2	–	4	–	0
Clemson	0	–	4	–	0	1	–	6	–	0
Nashville			–					–
+ – Conference co-champions

The 1908 Mercer Baptists football team represented Mercer University as a member of the Southern Intercollegiate Athletic Association (SIAA) during the 1908 college football season. They finished with a record of 3–4 and outscored their opponents 131–59.

== Schedule ==
Date	Opponent	Site	Result	Source
October 3	Locust Grove Institute*	Central City Park; Macon, GA	W 56–0	
October 10	Florida*	Central City Park; Macon, GA	W 24–0	
October 17	Auburn	Central City Park; Macon, GA	L 0–23	
October 31	Georgia	Central City Park; Macon, GA	L 0–10	
November 17	at The Citadel*	Charleston, SC	L 5–10	
November 19	Georgia Tech	Central City Park; Macon, GA	L 6–16	
November 26	Howard (AL)*	Central City Park; Macon, GA	W 45–0	
*Non-conference game
