= 1908 Vanderbilt Commodores football team =

American college football season

1908 Vanderbilt Commodores football
- Conference: Southern Intercollegiate Athletic Association
- Record: 7–2–1 (3–0–1 SIAA)
- Head coach: Dan McGugin (5th season)
- Offensive scheme: Short punt
- Captain: Vaughn Blake
- Home stadium: Dudley Field

1908 Southern Intercollegiate Athletic Association football standings
	Conf.					Overall
Team	W		L		T	W		L		T
LSU +	2	–	0	–	0	10	–	0	–	0
Auburn +	4	–	1	–	0	6	–	1	–	0
Vanderbilt	3	–	0	–	1	7	–	2	–	1
Tennessee	3	–	2	–	0	7	–	2	–	0
Georgia Tech	4	–	3	–	0	6	–	3	–	0
Georgia	2	–	2	–	1	5	–	2	–	1
Alabama	1	–	1	–	1	6	–	1	–	1
Sewanee	1	–	1	–	1	4	–	1	–	3
Mississippi A&M	1	–	3	–	0	3	–	4	–	0
Ole Miss	0	–	2	–	0	3	–	5	–	0
Mercer	0	–	3	–	0	3	–	4	–	0
Howard (AL)	0	–	3	–	0	2	–	4	–	0
Clemson	0	–	4	–	0	1	–	6	–	0
Nashville			–					–
+ – Conference co-champions

The 1908 Vanderbilt Commodores football team represented Vanderbilt University during the 1908 Southern Intercollegiate Athletic Association football season. The team's head coach was Dan McGugin, who served his fifth season in that capacity. Members of the Southern Intercollegiate Athletic Association (SIAA), the Commodores played eight home games in Nashville, Tennessee and finished the season with a record of 7–2–1 overall and 3–0–1 in SIAA.

On October 17, 1908, Vanderbilt played the school's 137th game, against Clemson, winning the contest 41–0 for the schools' 100th victory. Edwin Pope notes that 1908 was not a successful year for Vanderbilt, due to an inexperienced team, made up of many sophomores.

== Schedule ==
Date	Time	Opponent	Site	Result	Attendance	Source
September 26		Southwestern Presbyterian*	Dudley Field; Nashville, TN	W 11–5		
October 3		Maryville (TN)*	Dudley Field; Nashville, TN	W 32–0		
October 10		Rose Polytechnic*	Dudley Field; Nashville, TN	W 32–0		
October 17		Clemson	Dudley Field; Nashville, TN	W 41–0		
October 24		Ole Miss	Dudley Field; Nashville, TN (rivalry)	W 29–0		
October 31		at Michigan*	Ferry Field; Ann Arbor, MI	L 6–24		
November 7		Tennessee	Dudley Field; Nashville, TN (rivalry)	W 16–9		
November 14		Ohio State*	Dudley Field; Nashville, TN	L 6–17		
November 21	3:00 p.m.	at Washington University*	Francis Field; St. Louis, MO	W 28–0	6,000	
November 26		Sewanee	Dudley Field; Nashville, TN (rivalry)	T 6–6		
*Non-conference game

== Game summaries ==
=== Michigan ===
Before Vanderbilt played Michigan, Louis Hasslock had been on duty at Reelfoot Lake with a militia who were to guard against night riders. When he learned he could be granted a leave of absence if he were to join his football team, he walked a distance of twenty miles through a country infested with night riders, and caught a train at Union City.

=== Tennessee ===
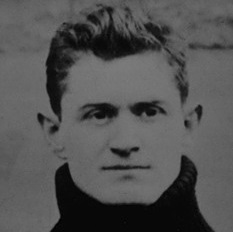
Ray Morrison saved a touchdown in 1908.

The Volunteers had compiled four wins in conference play. It was widely considered the best Tennessee football season up to that point. Vanderbilt won the match between the two schools 16 to 9.

Walker Leach made a 41-yard field goal to put the Vols up 4 to 0. "This seemed to arouse the local team" and Vanderbilt drove down the field for a touchdown. On a fake kick, Leach circled Vanderbilt's left end for 60 yards. Ray Morrison stopped him short of the goal. Nathan Dougherty was on Tennessee's squad.

== Players ==
=== Varsity letterwinners ===
"Wearers of the V."

==== Line ====
Player	Position	Games started	Hometown	Prep school	Height	Weight	Age
Vaughn Blake	end		Cuero, Texas	Bowen School		160	20
Cecil Covington	end						
Ewing Y. Freeland	tackle		Turnersville, Texas				21
R. B. Hager	tackle						
Louis Hasslock	guard		Nashville, Tennessee	Montgomery Bell Academy		173	20
Bruce McGehee	end						
Fatty McLain	center					196	23
Andrew Powell	guard						
E. B. Ross	guard						

==== Backfield ====
Player	Position	Games started	Hometown	Prep school	Height	Weight	Age
Guy Crawford	halfback						
Will Metzger	halfback		Nashville, Tennessee		6'1"	175	18
Ray Morrison	quarterback		Sugar Branch, Indiana	McTyiere School for Boys			23
David Morton	fullback		Louisville, Kentucky	Branham & Hughes School			
Henry Williams	halfback						
