= 1908 Auburn Tigers football team =

American college football season

1908 Auburn Tigers football
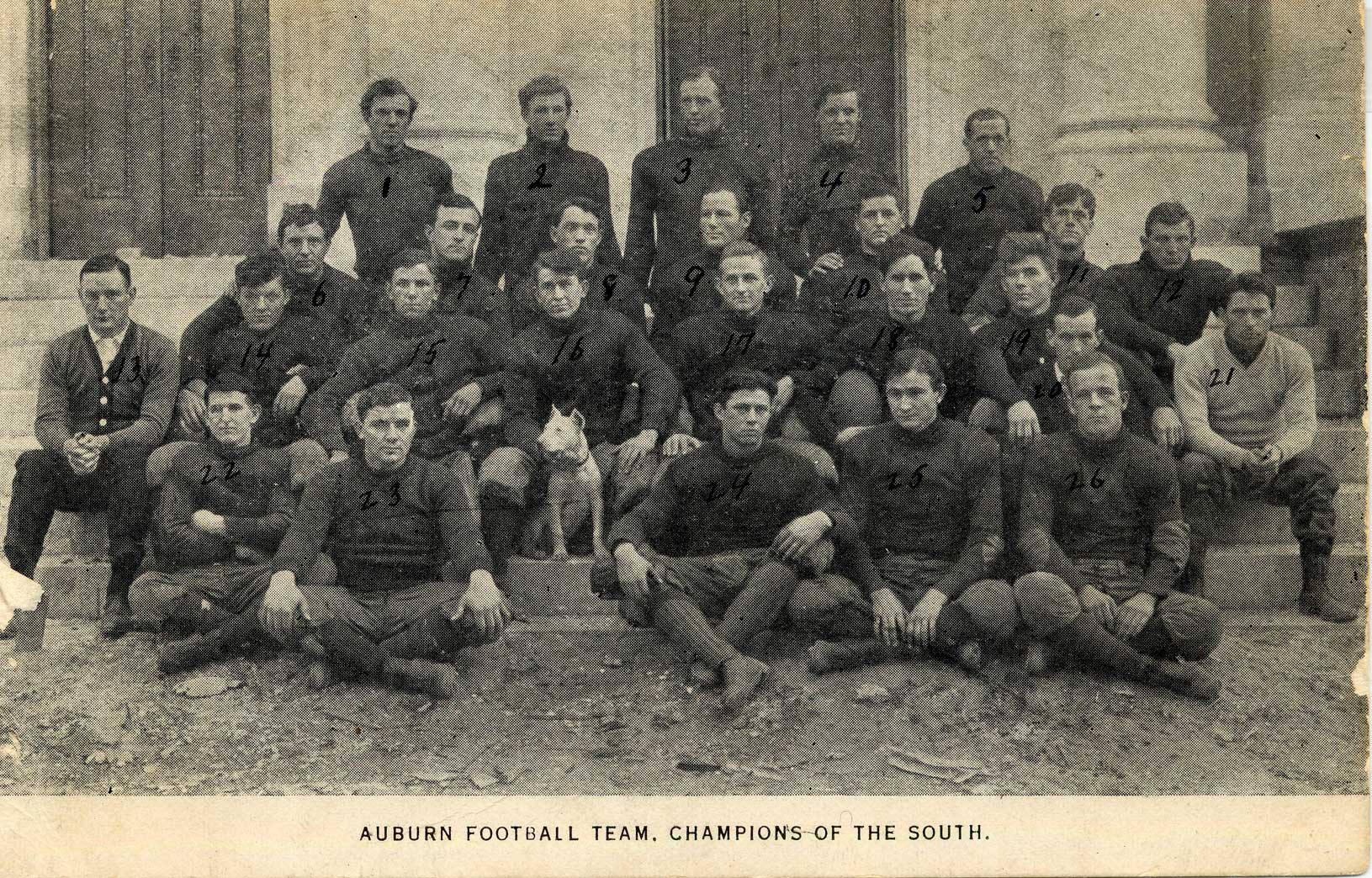

SIAA champion
- Conference: Southern Intercollegiate Athletic Association
- Record: 6–1 (4–1 SIAA)
- Head coach: Mike Donahue (4th season)
- Base defense: 7–2–2
- Captain: Tom McLure
- Home stadium: Drill Field; West End Park

1908 Southern Intercollegiate Athletic Association football standings
| | Conf. | | | | | Overall |
| Team | W | | L | | T | W | | L | | T |
|---|---|---|---|---|---|---|---|---|---|---|
| LSU + | 2 | – | 0 | – | 0 | 10 | – | 0 | – | 0 |
| Auburn + | 4 | – | 1 | – | 0 | 6 | – | 1 | – | 0 |
| Vanderbilt | 3 | – | 0 | – | 1 | 7 | – | 2 | – | 1 |
| Tennessee | 3 | – | 2 | – | 0 | 7 | – | 2 | – | 0 |
| Georgia Tech | 4 | – | 3 | – | 0 | 6 | – | 3 | – | 0 |
| Georgia | 2 | – | 2 | – | 1 | 5 | – | 2 | – | 1 |
| Alabama | 1 | – | 1 | – | 1 | 6 | – | 1 | – | 1 |
| Sewanee | 1 | – | 1 | – | 1 | 4 | – | 1 | – | 3 |
| Mississippi A&M | 1 | – | 3 | – | 0 | 3 | – | 4 | – | 0 |
| Ole Miss | 0 | – | 2 | – | 0 | 3 | – | 5 | – | 0 |
| Mercer | 0 | – | 3 | – | 0 | 3 | – | 4 | – | 0 |
| Howard (AL) | 0 | – | 3 | – | 0 | 2 | – | 4 | – | 0 |
| Clemson | 0 | – | 4 | – | 0 | 1 | – | 6 | – | 0 |
| Nashville | | | – | | | | | – |
+ – Conference co-champions

The 1908 Auburn Tigers football team represented Auburn University in the 1908 Southern Intercollegiate Athletic Association football season. The team went 6–1, outscoring opponents 158–10. Auburn featured a strong defense that held all but one opponent scoreless. The team was the first during the second term of coach Mike Donahue at Auburn.

The only points allowed all year was in the 10–2 loss to LSU, a team accused of professionalism. LSU claimed the title, but most sportswriters crowned Auburn SIAA champion. The win over Sewanee was dubbed by one writer "Auburn's Greatest Victory In Many Years".

== Before the season ==
Mike Donahue returned as head coach. Pat Dwyer assisted Donahue.

Newcomers included running back Lewie Hardage.

== Schedule ==
| Date | Time | Opponent | Site | Result | Attendance | Source |
|---|---|---|---|---|---|---|
| October 3 | | Howard (AL)* | West End Park; Birmingham, AL | W 18–0 | | |
| October 10 | | Gordon* | Drill Field; Auburn, AL | W 42–0 | | |
| October 17 | | at Mercer | Cenetral City Park; Macon, GA | W 23–0 | | |
| October 24 | 12:00 p.m. | Sewanee | West End Park; Birmingham, AL | W 6–0 | 3,000 | |
| October 31 | 3:45 p.m. | LSU | Drill Field; Auburn, AL | L 2–10 | | |
| November 7 | | at Georgia Tech | Ponce de Leon Park; Atlanta, GA | W 44–0 | | |
| November 26 | | Georgia | Montgomery Baseball Park; Montgomery, AL | W 23–0 | | |
*Non-conference game

== Game summaries ==
=== Howard (AL) ===
| Team | 1 | 2 | Total |
|---|---|---|---|
| • Auburn | 18 | 0 | 18 |
| Howard | 0 | 0 | 0 |

- Location: Birmingham, Alabama
- Game start: afternoon
- Game weather: 70°, Clear
- Referee: Frank Jones

In a game of a 20- and 15-minute halves, Auburn scored three touchdowns in the first half to put away Howard at West End Park in Birmingham, Alabama. Despite being outweighed by Howard, Auburn had success running against the Bulldogs' tackles in the first half. The second half saw no score on either side with Auburn held in check by the punting of Bennie, Howard's left tackle. Both teams were reported to show a lack of preparation, with Auburn's talent making the difference in the game.

=== Gordon College ===
| Team | 1 | 2 | Total |
|---|---|---|---|
| Gordon | 0 | 0 | 0 |
| • Auburn | 30 | 12 | 42 |

- Location: Auburn, Alabama
- Game start: afternoon
- Game weather: 63°, Cloudy

In a game where the Tigers were not forced to punt, Auburn easily defeated the high school team from Gordon College in quick game at the Auburn athletic field. Auburn took the opening kickoff and drove for its first touchdown in the first two minutes, followed by four more touchdowns before the end of the half through the rushing of Lew Hardage and D. Herron. Auburn's scrubs scored two more touchdowns in the second half to finish out the game.

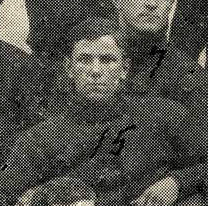
Lew Hardage

=== Mercer ===
| Team | 1 | 2 | Total |
|---|---|---|---|
| • Auburn | 6 | 17 | 23 |
| Mercer | 0 | 0 | 0 |

- Location: Macon, Georgia
- Game weather: 80°, Partly cloudy

Auburn was held to a single score in the first half, but wore down Mercer's line in the second half, scoring three touchdowns behind the running of Lew Hardage. Mercer's Poole returned an Auburn interception 70 yards before being dragged down short of the goal line by Auburn halfback W. W. Wynne, which was the only threat to score the Baptists had all game.

=== Sewanee ===
| Team | 1 | 2 | Total |
|---|---|---|---|
| Sewanee | 0 | 0 | 0 |
| • Auburn | 0 | 6 | 6 |

- Location: Birmingham, Alabama
- Game start: 12:00 pm
- Game attendance: 3,000
- Game weather: 65°, Cloudy
- Referee: Bradley Walker

Sewanee held the ball for most of the first half, exploiting Auburn's tackles—brought in against the inside run—with runs around end. Sewanee was unable to score, however, with Auburn's George Sparkman recovering a Sewanee fumble on the Auburn two yard line. Auburn began to move the ball consistently on the visitors late in the first half, ending the period in Sewanee territory.

In the second half, changes in Auburn's defense stymied Sewanee's end runs and field position gradually shifted in Auburn's favor. With seven minutes left in the game, Auburn's Lew Hardage returned a Sewanee punt 45 yards for the game's only touchdown. It was dubbed by one source "Auburn's Greatest Victory In Many Years" The starting lineup was Sparkman (left end), Bonner (left tackle), Locke (left guard), Davis (center), Allen (right guard), Esslinger (right tackle), Reynolds (right end), McLure (quarterback), Wynne (left halfback), Hardage (right halfback), Penton (fullback).

=== Louisiana State ===
| Team | 1 | 2 | Total |
|---|---|---|---|
| • LSU | 5 | 5 | 10 |
| Auburn | 2 | 0 | 2 |

- Location: Auburn, Alabama
- Game start: 3:45 pm
- Game weather: 70°, Fair
- Referee: James Halligan

Undefeated LSU met undefeated Auburn for the top spot in the SIAA at the Auburn athletic field.

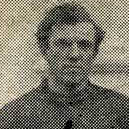
T. C. Locke

The first touchdown came from John Seip. Later in the half, Auburn's T. C. Locke blocked an LSU punt which was recovered by LSU's Fenton behind his own goal for a safety. LSU made the second score using conventional football.

“We won every game that fall except LSU,” Auburn star Walker Reynolds told Clyde Bolton in 1973. “But LSU had a pro team.”

The starting lineup was Sparkman (left end), Bonner (left tackle), Locke (left guard), Davis (center), Allen (right guard), Esslinger (right tackle), Reynolds (right end), McLure (quarterback), Hardage (left halfback), Wynne (right halfback), Penton (fullback).

=== Georgia Tech ===
| Team | 1 | 2 | Total |
|---|---|---|---|
| • Auburn | 23 | 21 | 44 |
| Ga. Tech | 0 | 0 | 0 |

- Location: Atlanta, Georgia
- Referee: Butler (North Carolina)

Auburn ran up a 44–0 score on coach John Heisman's Georgia Tech Yellow Jackets in their annual rivalry contest. Lew Hardage and George Penton made two touchdowns each, including a 108-yard kick return by Hardage. Walker Reynolds and George Sparkman had one each. Reynolds' was a 35-yard run and Sparkman's a 65-yard run. Reynolds contributed six extra points. The starting lineup was Hill (left end), J. G. Davis (left tackle), Motley (left guard), Beaver (center), Allen (right guard), Locke (right tackle), Reynolds (right end), McLure (quarterback), Hardage (left halfback), Wynne (right halfback), Penton (fullback).

=== Georgia ===
| Team | 1 | 2 | Total |
|---|---|---|---|
| Georgia | 0 | 0 | 0 |
| • Auburn | 6 | 17 | 23 |

- Location: Montgomery, Alabama
- Game weather: Very hot
- Referee: Butler (North Carolina)

As expected – "there is nothing to this game but Auburn," Auburn handled the Georgia Bulldogs easily in their annual rivalry game. After seven minutes had elapsed, end Walker Reynolds ran for an 80-yard touchdown using the stiff arm "amidst the wildest enthusiasm." The Bulldogs held the Tigers the rest of the first half. The starting lineup was Hill (left end), J. G. Davis (left tackle), Motley (left guard), Beaver (center), Allen (right guard), Bonner (right tackle), Reynolds (right end), McLure (quarterback), Hardage (left halfback), Locke (right halfback), Penton (fullback).

== Postseason ==
=== Southern champions ===
Amidst fears of many players being ineligible under SIAA rules most sportswriters did not include LSU for consideration as conference champions. Auburn and Vanderbilt were among those listed as alternative Southern champions. Most chose Auburn.

=== Awards and honors ===
Captain and quarterback and Tom McLure was selected All-Southern by Vanderbilt coach Dan McGugin and Georgia Tech coach John Heisman. McGugin describes his play: "McClure was not particularly fast, but a spirited leader, an excellent general and a sure tackler." Lew Hardage was selected All-Southern by McGugin; and J. G. Davis was selected All-Southern by Heisman.

== Players ==
=== Starters ===
==== Line ====
| Name | Position | Games started | Hometown | Prep school | Height | Weight | Age |
|---|---|---|---|---|---|---|---|
| Burton Gray Allen | guard | | Demopolis, Alabama | | | | |
| Big Chief Bonner | tackle | | | | | | |
| James Grover Davis | center | | | | | | |
| Harry Esslinger | tackle | | Gurley, Alabama | | | | |
| T. C. Locke | guard | | | | | | |
| Walker Reynolds | end | | | GMA | | | |
| George B. Sparkman, Jr. | end | | Tampa, Florida | Hillsborough | | | |

==== Backfield ====
| Name | Position | Games started | Hometown | Prep school | Height | Weight | Age |
|---|---|---|---|---|---|---|---|
| Lew Hardage | halfback | | Decatur, Alabama | | | | |
| Tom McLure | quarterback | | Jacksonville, Alabama | | | | |
| George Penton | fullback | | Rockford, Alabama | | | | |
| Walter Woolf Wynne | halfback | | | | | | |

=== Subs ===
==== Line ====
| Name | Position | Hometown | Prep school | Height | Weight | Age |
|---|---|---|---|---|---|---|
| James Jefferson Beaver | center | | | | | |
| Homer Cogdell | guard | Inverness, Alabama | | | 176 | |
| James Gillis Gauntt | guard | | | | | |
| William Augustus Harman | end | | | | | |
| Armstrong Hill | end | | | | | |
| Sheep Lamb | tackle | Eutaw, Alabama | | | 181 | |
| James Walter Motley | guard | | | | | |
| J. D. Spigener | guard | | | | | |
| William Swart | end | | | | | |

==== Backfield ====
| Name | Position | Hometown | Prep school | Height | Weight | Age |
|---|---|---|---|---|---|---|
| John E. Davis | fullback | Oak Grove, Alabama | | | 168 | |
| Benjamin Edward Harris | halfback | | | | | |
| Daniel Herren | halfback | | | | | |

==== Unlisted ====
| Name | Position |
|---|---|
C. E. Gaum
L. H. Hubbard
A. H. Skinner

== Coaching staff ==
- Head coach: Mike Donahue
- Assistant coaches: James Dwyer, Dan Wilkinson
- Manager: Thomas Bragg
