= 1908 Georgia Bulldogs football team =

American college football season

1908 Georgia Bulldogs football
- Conference: Southern Intercollegiate Athletic Association
- Record: 5–2–1 (2–2–1 SIAA)
- Head coach: Branch Bocock (1st season)
- Captain: Herman De LaPerriere
- Home stadium: Herty Field

1908 Southern Intercollegiate Athletic Association football standings
	Conf.					Overall
Team	W		L		T	W		L		T
LSU +	2	–	0	–	0	10	–	0	–	0
Auburn +	4	–	1	–	0	6	–	1	–	0
Vanderbilt	3	–	0	–	1	7	–	2	–	1
Tennessee	3	–	2	–	0	7	–	2	–	0
Georgia Tech	4	–	3	–	0	6	–	3	–	0
Georgia	2	–	2	–	1	5	–	2	–	1
Alabama	1	–	1	–	1	6	–	1	–	1
Sewanee	1	–	1	–	1	4	–	1	–	3
Mississippi A&M	1	–	3	–	0	3	–	4	–	0
Ole Miss	0	–	2	–	0	3	–	5	–	0
Mercer	0	–	3	–	0	3	–	4	–	0
Howard (AL)	0	–	3	–	0	2	–	4	–	0
Clemson	0	–	4	–	0	1	–	6	–	0
Nashville			–					–
+ – Conference co-champions

The 1908 Georgia Bulldogs football team represented the University of Georgia during the 1908 Southern Intercollegiate Athletic Association football season. The Bulldogs completed the season with a 5–2–1 record. Georgia had victories against Clemson and South Carolina, but lost to one of its main rivals, Auburn. This was the team's first and only season under the guidance of head coach Branch Bocock, although he had coached three games in 1907. One of the players on the 1908 team was quarterback George "Kid" Woodruff. After a successful season, Woodruff traveled abroad in 1909 and returned to the university in 1910 and 1911 and eventually became the head coach of the Bulldogs in 1923.

The game against Alabama on November 14 was the 100th game played by the football program since its inception in 1892. Georgia tied Alabama in that game, bringing Georgia's record in the first 100 games to 45–47–8, .490 winning percentage.

== Schedule ==
Date	Opponent	Site	Result	Source
October 10	North Georgia*	Herty Field; Athens, GA	W 16–0	
October 17	South Carolina*	Herty Field; Athens, GA (rivalry)	W 29–6	
October 24	at Tennessee	Waite Field; Knoxville, TN (rivalry)	L 0–10	
October 31	at Mercer	Central City Park; Macon, GA	W 10–0	
November 5	vs. Clemson	Augusta, GA (rivalry)	W 8–0	
November 14	at Alabama	Birmingham Fairgrounds; Birmingham, AL (rivalry)	T 6–6	
November 21	Davidson*	Herty Field; Athens, GA	W 2–0	
November 26	Auburn	Montgomery Baseball Park; Montgomery, AL (Deep South's Oldest Rivalry)	L 0–23	
*Non-conference game

== Sources ==
- Reed, Thomas Walter (c. 1949). "Athletics at the University from the Beginning Through 1947". History of the University of Georgia. dlg.galileo.usg.edu. p. 3493.
- "Alabama All-Time Vs Georgia". prideofthetide.com. 2006.
