= 1908 Mississippi A&M Aggies football team =

American college football season

1908 Mississippi A&M Aggies football
- Conference: Southern Intercollegiate Athletic Association
- Record: 3–4 (1–3 SIAA)
- Head coach: Fred Furman (2nd season)
- Home stadium: Hardy Field

1908 Southern Intercollegiate Athletic Association football standings
	Conf.					Overall
Team	W		L		T	W		L		T
LSU +	2	–	0	–	0	10	–	0	–	0
Auburn +	4	–	1	–	0	6	–	1	–	0
Vanderbilt	3	–	0	–	1	7	–	2	–	1
Tennessee	3	–	2	–	0	7	–	2	–	0
Georgia Tech	4	–	3	–	0	6	–	3	–	0
Georgia	2	–	2	–	1	5	–	2	–	1
Alabama	1	–	1	–	1	6	–	1	–	1
Sewanee	1	–	1	–	1	4	–	1	–	3
Mississippi A&M	1	–	3	–	0	3	–	4	–	0
Ole Miss	0	–	2	–	0	3	–	5	–	0
Mercer	0	–	3	–	0	3	–	4	–	0
Howard (AL)	0	–	3	–	0	2	–	4	–	0
Clemson	0	–	4	–	0	1	–	6	–	0
Nashville			–					–
+ – Conference co-champions

The 1908 Mississippi A&M Aggies football team represented The Agricultural and Mechanical College of the State of Mississippi (now known as Mississippi State University) as a member of the Southern Intercollegiate Athletic Association (SIAA) during the 1908 college football season. Led by second-year head coach Fred Furman, the Aggies compiled an overall record of 3–4, with a mark of 1–3 in conference play. Mississippi A&M played home games at the Hardy Field in Starkville, Mississippi.

== Schedule ==
Date	Opponent	Site	Result	Attendance	Source
October 10	Louisiana Industrial*	Hardy Field; Starkville, MS	W 47–0		
October 17	at Georgia Tech	Ponce de Leon Park; Atlanta, GA	L 0–23		
October 23	Southwestern Presbyterian*	Columbus Fairgrounds; Columbus, MS	L 5–6	4,000	
October 31	Kentucky University*	Hardy Field; Starkville, MS	W 12–5		
November 7	at LSU	State Field; Baton Rouge, LA	L 0–50	1,500	
November 14	at Tulane	Pelican Park; New Orleans, LA	L 0–33		
November 26	vs. Ole Miss	Mississippi State Fairgrounds; Jackson, MS (rivalry)	W 44–6		
*Non-conference game
