= Ike Knox =

American football player (1887–1969)

- Born: February 2, 1887; Pittsboro, Mississippi
- Died: September 1, 1969 (aged 82); Vicksburg, Mississippi
- Occupation: Surgeon
- Football career

Profile
- Position: Halfback

Career information
- College: Ole Miss (1907–1908)

Awards and highlights
- All-Southern (1908); Mississippi Sports Hall of Fame; Ole Miss Sports Hall of Fame

Isaac Cecil Knox (February 2, 1887 – September 1, 1969) was an athlete at the University of Mississippi and a surgeon.

== Ole Miss ==
Knox played baseball, basketball, and football at Ole Miss. He helped organize the school's first basketball team. He was most renowned as a football player, selected to John Heisman's All-Southern team in 1908. Commenting on the game between Vanderbilt and Ole Miss which he officiated, Grantland Rice called Ike Knox, “a sensation in light hair, broad shoulders and stocky frame that gave both the Commodore offense and defense a shock that will not soon be forgotten.” Rice continued: “Time and again, as a Commodore back would start down the field, the gorilla-like arms of the demon Knox would encircle his frame and said runner wasn’t only checked, but more often still, literally hurled yards towards his own goal line.” In another article Rice wrote that only the mediocrity of his team kept Knox from being regionally and nationally famous: “If Knox has been upon a Vanderbilt, Sewanee or Auburn eleven he would more than likely have been hailed as one of the greatest halfbacks of the decade.” He was elected to the Mississippi Sports Hall of Fame in 1964. He was nominated though not selected for an Associated Press All-Time Southeast 1869–1919 era team. Knox also received some education at Vanderbilt.

== Surgeon ==
He worked as a surgeon in Vicksburg. Knox practiced medicine for more than 50 years and was instrumental in establishing the Ole Miss Medical Alumni Association. Knox also founded the Vicksburg Hospital on Monroe Street.

== House ==
Dr. Knox's house in Vicksburg is on the National Register of Historic Places.
