= 1908 Alabama Crimson Tide football team =

American college football season

1908 Alabama Crimson Tide football
- Conference: Southern Intercollegiate Athletic Association
- Record: 6–1–1 (1–1–1 SIAA)
- Head coach: J. W. H. Pollard (3rd season)
- Captain: Henry Burks
- Home stadium: The Quad; Birmingham Fairgrounds

1908 Southern Intercollegiate Athletic Association football standings
	Conf.					Overall
Team	W		L		T	W		L		T
LSU +	2	–	0	–	0	10	–	0	–	0
Auburn +	4	–	1	–	0	6	–	1	–	0
Vanderbilt	3	–	0	–	1	7	–	2	–	1
Tennessee	3	–	2	–	0	7	–	2	–	0
Georgia Tech	4	–	3	–	0	6	–	3	–	0
Georgia	2	–	2	–	1	5	–	2	–	1
Alabama	1	–	1	–	1	6	–	1	–	1
Sewanee	1	–	1	–	1	4	–	1	–	3
Mississippi A&M	1	–	3	–	0	3	–	4	–	0
Ole Miss	0	–	2	–	0	3	–	5	–	0
Mercer	0	–	3	–	0	3	–	4	–	0
Howard (AL)	0	–	3	–	0	2	–	4	–	0
Clemson	0	–	4	–	0	1	–	6	–	0
Nashville			–					–
+ – Conference co-champions

The 1908 Alabama Crimson Tide football team (variously "Alabama", "UA" or "Bama") represented the University of Alabama in the 1908 Southern Intercollegiate Athletic Association football season. It was the Crimson Tide's 16th overall and 13th season as a member of the Southern Intercollegiate Athletic Association (SIAA). The team was led by head coach J. W. H. Pollard, in his third year, and played their home games at the University of Alabama Quad in Tuscaloosa and the Birmingham Fairgrounds in Birmingham, Alabama. They finished the season with a record of six wins, one loss and one tie (6–1–1 overall, 1–1–1 in the SIAA).

After opening the 1908 season with three consecutive shutouts, Alabama lost their only game of the season, 11–6, at Georgia Tech. After a victory over Chattanooga and a tie against Georgia, Alabama played Haskell. Against Haskell, Alabama scored a touchdown on a 65-yard interception return, Haskell missed a field goal, and another Haskell drive ended with an interception deep in Alabama territory. In the season finale against Tennessee, Alabama back Derrill Pratt attempted eight field goals and made only one for a 4–0 Alabama victory.

== Schedule ==
Date	Opponent	Site	Result	Source
October 3	Wetumpka Agricultural School*	The Quad; Tuscaloosa, AL	W 26–0	
October 10	at Howard (AL)*	West End Park; Birmingham, AL	W 17–0	
October 17	Cincinnati*	Birmingham Fairgrounds; Birmingham, AL	W 16–0	
October 24	at Georgia Tech	Ponce de Leon Park; Atlanta, GA (rivalry)	L 6–11	
October 31	Chattanooga*	The Quad; Tuscaloosa, AL	W 23–6	
November 14	Georgia	Birmingham Fairgrounds; Birmingham, AL (rivalry)	T 6–6	
November 20	Haskell*	The Quad; Tuscaloosa, AL	W 9–8	
November 26	Tennessee	Birmingham Fairgrounds; Birmingham, AL (rivalry)	W 4–0	
*Non-conference game

- Scoring note: (Note: For the 1908 season, point values were different from those used in contemporary games. In 1908 a touchdown was worth five points, a field goal was worth four points and an extra point (PAT) was worth one point.)
