= Tom McLure =

American football and baseball player

Profile
- Position: Quarterback

Personal information
- Born: December 20, 1888; Jacksonville, Alabama, U.S.
- Died: March 24, 1931 (aged 42) near Ehrhardt, South Carolina, U.S.

Career information
- College: Auburn (1906–1908)

Awards and highlights
- All-Southern (1908)

John Thomas McLure (December 20, 1888 – March 24, 1931) was an American college football and baseball player who served in the First World War.

== Auburn University ==
McClure was a prominent quarterback for Mike Donahue's Auburn Tigers of Auburn University.

=== 1908 ===
In 1908, a year in which he was captain, he was selected All-Southern; Vanderbilt coach Dan McGugin describes his play: "McClure was not particularly fast, but a spirited leader, an excellent general and a sure tackler." LSU won the SIAA championship, but amidst fears of many players being ineligible under SIAA rules most sportswriters did not include them for All-Southern selection. LSU rival Tulane, which was also undefeated in conference play, accused many LSU players of professionalism. Auburn is one team listed as an alternative southern champion, for LSU was its only loss.

== Military service and later life ==
During World War I, McClure served as a captain in Company F, of the first regiment of engineers, in the American Expeditionary Forces (AEF). He declared that going over the top in France beats charging into an opposing eleven. He was severely wounded in the Battle of Cantigny, having a portion of his face shot away and sustaining injury to his knee. He was awarded the Croix de Guerre for bravery.

McClure later worked as a resident engineer for South Carolina's state highway department. He died on March 24, 1931, two miles south of Ehrhardt, South Carolina, where he was supervising work on highway No. 36.
