= Big Chief Bonner =

American football player and engineer

Profile
- Position: Guard

Career information
- College: Auburn (1911)

Awards and highlights
- All-Southern (1911)

William Smith "Big Chief" Bonner was a college football player and engineer.

== Auburn University ==
Bonner was a prominent guard for Mike Donahue's Auburn Tigers of Auburn University.

=== 1911 ===
Bonner was captain and All-Southern in 1911. The 1911 team went 4–0–1 in conference play.

== Mobile ==
He worked as an engineer in Mobile, Alabama.
