= Lawrence Markley =

American college football player (1884–1920)

Profile
- Position: Fullback

Personal information
- Born: November 24, 1884; Nebraska, U.S.
- Died: December 28, 1920 (aged 36); Campeche, Mexico
- Listed height: 5 ft 10 in (1.78 m)
- Listed weight: 165 lb (75 kg)

Career information
- College: Sewanee (1907–1908)

Awards and highlights
- All-Southern (1907, 1908)

Lawrence Markley (November 24, 1884 – December 28, 1920) was an American college football player

== College football ==
Markley was a native of Chicago. He played for the Sewanee Tigers of Sewanee: The University of the South. He was captain of the 1908 team, and selected an All-Southern fullback in both 1907 and 1908. Vanderbilt coach Dan McGugin wrote of Markley, "He has always been a very stubborn man on the defense, effective on a short plunge, and his cool head has helped to steady his team through many a crisis." At Sewanee, he was a member of Sigma Alpha Epsilon.

== Drowning ==
Markley was killed by drowning, along with his father John, David Clarence Gibboney, and Frank Shriver near Champotón, Campeche, Mexico.
