= Stricker Coles =

American football player and referee (1888–1932)

Clemson Tigers
- Position: End

Personal information
- Born: August 27, 1888; Rock Hill, South Carolina, US
- Died: September 29, 1932 (aged 44); New Orleans, Louisiana, US

Career information
- College: Clemson (1906–1908)

Stricker "Strick" Coles (August 27, 1888 – September 29, 1932) was a college football player and referee, as well as a college baseball player. He played both for Clemson College. He was an end on the football team and an infielder on the baseball team, and was captain of both his senior season. He weighed just 120 pounds when he first joined the football team. He was the younger brother of Cad Coles.
