= 1908 Sewanee Tigers football team =

American college football season

1908 Sewanee Tigers football
- Conference: Southern Intercollegiate Athletic Association
- Record: 4–1–3 (1–1–1 SIAA)
- Head coach: Harry Van Surdam (1st season)
- Captain: Lawrence Markley
- Home stadium: Hardee Field

1908 Southern Intercollegiate Athletic Association football standings
	Conf.					Overall
Team	W		L		T	W		L		T
LSU +	2	–	0	–	0	10	–	0	–	0
Auburn +	4	–	1	–	0	6	–	1	–	0
Vanderbilt	3	–	0	–	1	7	–	2	–	1
Tennessee	3	–	2	–	0	7	–	2	–	0
Georgia Tech	4	–	3	–	0	6	–	3	–	0
Georgia	2	–	2	–	1	5	–	2	–	1
Alabama	1	–	1	–	1	6	–	1	–	1
Sewanee	1	–	1	–	1	4	–	1	–	3
Mississippi A&M	1	–	3	–	0	3	–	4	–	0
Ole Miss	0	–	2	–	0	3	–	5	–	0
Mercer	0	–	3	–	0	3	–	4	–	0
Howard (AL)	0	–	3	–	0	2	–	4	–	0
Clemson	0	–	4	–	0	1	–	6	–	0
Nashville			–					–
+ – Conference co-champions

The 1908 Sewanee Tigers football team represented Sewanee: The University of the South during the 1908 college football season as a member of the Southern Intercollegiate Athletic Association (SIAA). The Tigers were led by head coach Harry Van Surdam in his first season and finished with a record of four wins, one loss, and three ties (4–1–3 overall, 1–1–1 in the SIAA).

== Schedule ==
Date	Opponent	Site	Result	Attendance	Source
October 3	Mooney School*	Hardee Field; Sewanee, TN	W 29–0		
October 12	Castle Heights*	Hardee Field; Sewanee, TN	W 35–2		
October 17	at Virginia*	Lafayette Field; Norfolk, VA	T 0–0	5,000	
October 24	at Auburn	West End Park; Birmingham, AL	L 0–6	3,000	
October 31	at Kentucky State College*	State athletic field; Lexington, KY	W 12–0		
November 7	at Saint Louis*	Sportsman's Park; St. Louis, MO	T 6–6		
November 14	at Georgia Tech	Ponce de Leon Park; Atlanta, GA	W 6–0		
November 26	at Vanderbilt	Dudley Field; Nashville, TN (rivalry)	T 6–6		
*Non-conference game
