= 1908 Tennessee Volunteers football team =

American college football season

1908 Tennessee Volunteers football
- Conference: Southern Intercollegiate Athletic Association
- Record: 7–2 (3–2 SIAA)
- Head coach: George Levene (2nd season)
- Captain: Walker Leach
- Home stadium: Waite Field

1908 Southern Intercollegiate Athletic Association football standings
	Conf.					Overall
Team	W		L		T	W		L		T
LSU +	2	–	0	–	0	10	–	0	–	0
Auburn +	4	–	1	–	0	6	–	1	–	0
Vanderbilt	3	–	0	–	1	7	–	2	–	1
Tennessee	3	–	2	–	0	7	–	2	–	0
Georgia Tech	4	–	3	–	0	6	–	3	–	0
Georgia	2	–	2	–	1	5	–	2	–	1
Alabama	1	–	1	–	1	6	–	1	–	1
Sewanee	1	–	1	–	1	4	–	1	–	3
Mississippi A&M	1	–	3	–	0	3	–	4	–	0
Ole Miss	0	–	2	–	0	3	–	5	–	0
Mercer	0	–	3	–	0	3	–	4	–	0
Howard (AL)	0	–	3	–	0	2	–	4	–	0
Clemson	0	–	4	–	0	1	–	6	–	0
Nashville			–					–
+ – Conference co-champions

The 1908 Tennessee Volunteers football team represented the University of Tennessee in the 1908 Southern Intercollegiate Athletic Association football season. The season was the second of head coach George Levene's three-year tenure.

== Schedule ==
Date	Opponent	Site	Result	Attendance	Source
October 3	North Carolina*	Waite Field; Knoxville, TN	W 12–0		
October 10	Maryville (TN)*	Waite Field; Knoxville, TN	W 39–5		
October 17	Kentucky State College*	Waite Field; Knoxville, TN (rivalry)	W 7–0		
October 24	Georgia	Waite Field; Knoxville, TN (rivalry)	W 10–0		
October 31	at Georgia Tech	Ponce de Leon Park; Atlanta, GA (rivalry)	W 6–5	2,000	
November 7	at Vanderbilt	Dudley Field; Nashville, TN (rivalry)	L 9–16		
November 14	Clemson	Waite Field; Knoxville, TN	W 6–5		
November 21	Chattanooga*	Waite Field; Knoxville, TN	W 35–6		
November 26	at Alabama	Birmingham Fairgrounds; Birmingham, AL (rivalry)	L 0–4	4,000	
*Non-conference game

== Game summaries ==
=== North Carolina ===
Fullback Clarence McCollum returned a fumble 75 yards against North Carolina.

=== Maryville ===
In the second week of play, the Vols beat Maryville 39–5.

=== Kentucky State ===
Tennessee celebrated the victory over Kentucky State 7–0, as they were outweighed 10 pounds to the man. A 40-yard run by Leach set up an offtackle run by Peery.

=== Georgia ===
Leach scored all of Tennessee's points in the 10–0 victory over Georgia with a 30-yard fumble return for a touchdown and a 40-yard field goal.

=== Georgia Tech ===
Tennessee defeated John Heisman's Georgia Tech team 6–5, "in a game in which they clearly outplayed the Yellow Jackets". Tech scored first thanks to three consecutive completed forward passes. Perry scored Tennessee's touchdown. He scored another just after the referee blew the whistle to end the contest.

=== At Vanderbilt ===
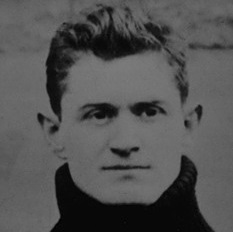
Ray Morrison saved a touchdown in 1908.

In 1908 the McGugin-coached Vanderbilt won the match between the two schools 16 to 9.

Walker Leach made a 41-yard field goal to put the Vols up 4 to 0. "This seemed to arouse the local team" and Vanderbilt drove down the field for a touchdown. On a fake kick, Leach circled Vanderbilt's left end for 60 yards. Ray Morrison stopped him short of the goal.

=== Clemson ===
Tennessee also edged Clemson 6–5.

=== Chattanooga ===
The Vols beat Chattanooga 39–5.

=== Alabama ===
Alabama surprised with the 4 to 0 victory over Tennessee to close the season.

== Postseason ==
Walker Leach and Nathan Dougherty were selected All-Southern. Vanderbilt coach Dan McGugin noted "All things considered, Leach was perhaps the best football player of the year in Dixie."
