= 1908 Georgia Tech Yellow Jackets football team =

American college football season

1908 Georgia Tech Yellow Jackets football
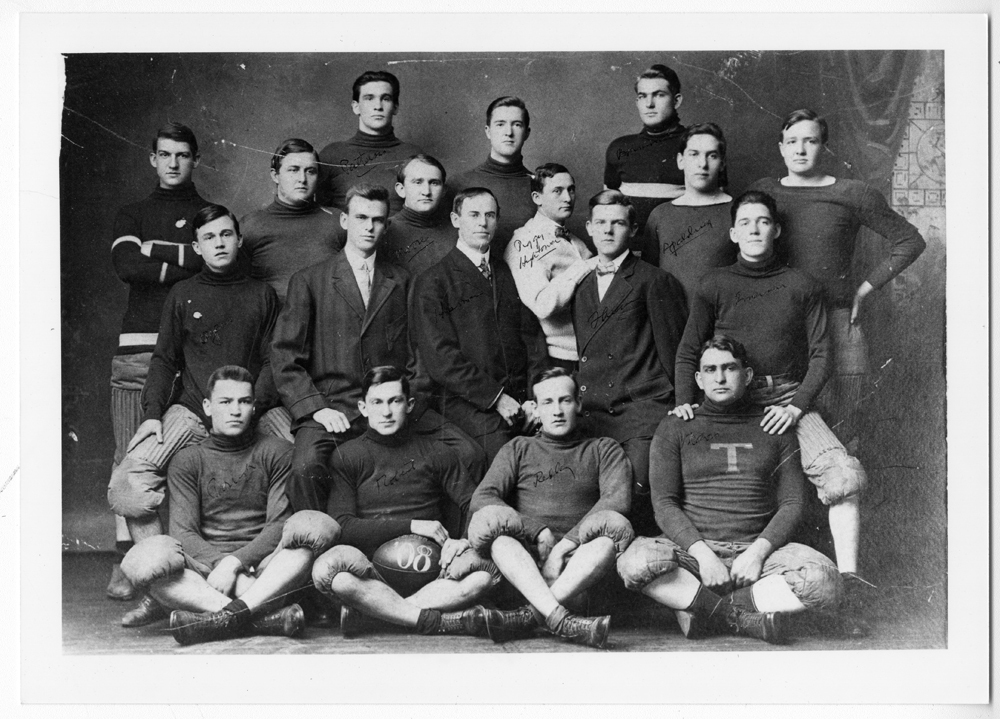
- Conference: Southern Intercollegiate Athletic Association
- Record: 6–3 (4–3 SIAA)
- Head coach: John Heisman (5th season)
- Captain: L. W. Robert Jr.
- Home stadium: Ponce de Leon Park

1908 Southern Intercollegiate Athletic Association football standings
	Conf.					Overall
Team	W		L		T	W		L		T
LSU +	2	–	0	–	0	10	–	0	–	0
Auburn +	4	–	1	–	0	6	–	1	–	0
Vanderbilt	3	–	0	–	1	7	–	2	–	1
Tennessee	3	–	2	–	0	7	–	2	–	0
Georgia Tech	4	–	3	–	0	6	–	3	–	0
Georgia	2	–	2	–	1	5	–	2	–	1
Alabama	1	–	1	–	1	6	–	1	–	1
Sewanee	1	–	1	–	1	4	–	1	–	3
Mississippi A&M	1	–	3	–	0	3	–	4	–	0
Ole Miss	0	–	2	–	0	3	–	5	–	0
Mercer	0	–	3	–	0	3	–	4	–	0
Howard (AL)	0	–	3	–	0	2	–	4	–	0
Clemson	0	–	4	–	0	1	–	6	–	0
Nashville			–					–
+ – Conference co-champions

The 1908 Georgia Tech Yellow Jackets football team represented the Georgia Institute of Technology during the 1908 Southern Intercollegiate Athletic Association football season. J. R. Davis was selected All-Southern. Vanderbilt coach Dan McGugin wrote, "He has one glaring fault—a tendency to tackle around the eyebrows. Otherwise he is a splendid foot ball man. He weighs two hundred pounds, is never hurt, never fumbles, bucks a line hard and furnishes excellent interference. He was the strength and stay of Tech."

== Schedule ==
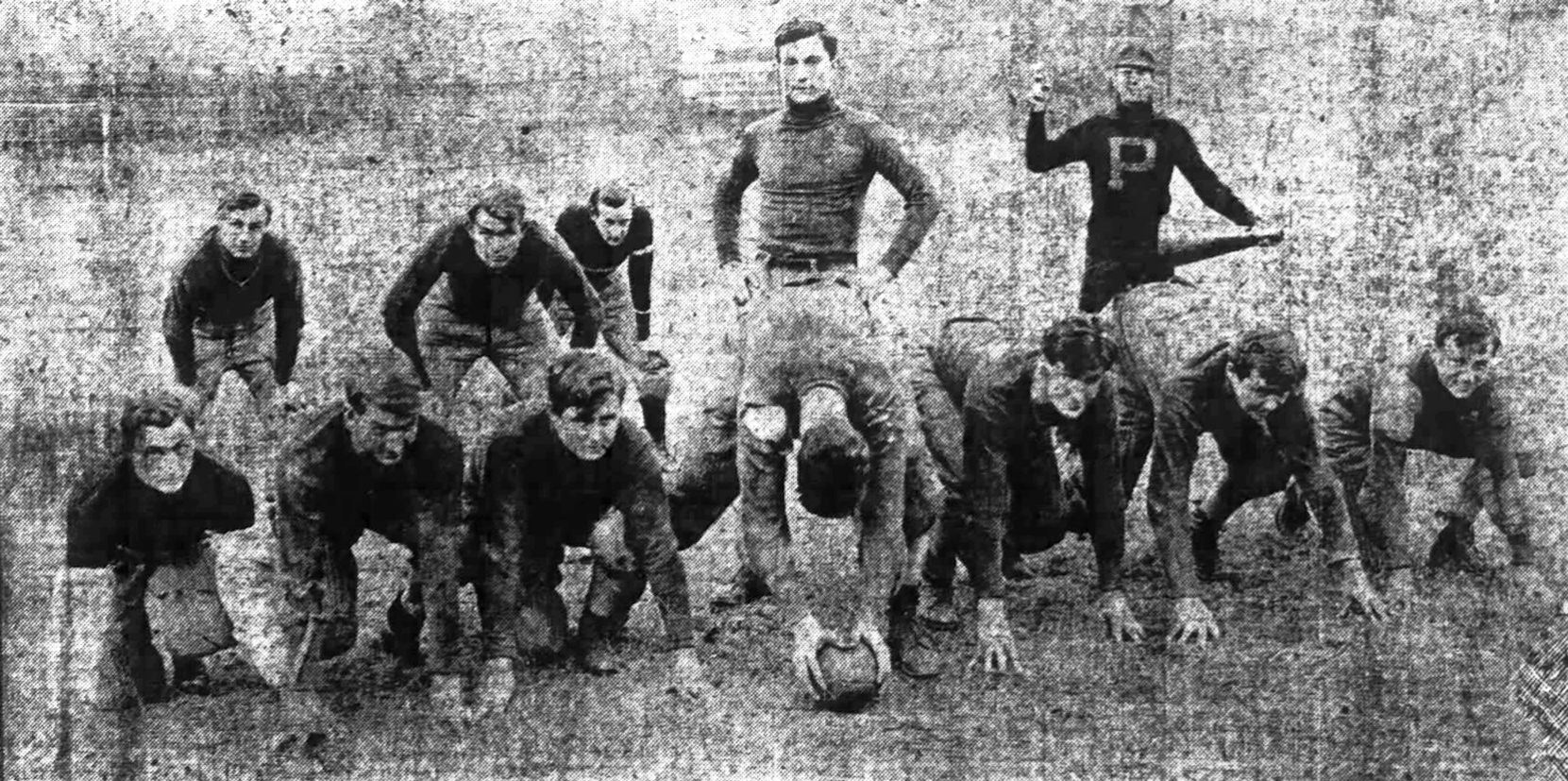
The team in action

Date	Opponent	Site	Result	Source
October 3	Gordon*	Ponce de Leon Park; Atlanta, GA	W 32–0	
October 10	Mooney*	Ponce de Leon Park; Atlanta, GA	W 30–0	
October 17	Mississippi A&M	Ponce de Leon Park; Atlanta, GA	W 23–0	
October 24	Alabama	Ponce de Leon Park; Atlanta, GA (rivalry)	W 11–6	
October 31	Tennessee	Ponce de Leon Park; Atlanta, GA (rivalry)	L 5–6	
November 7	Auburn	Ponce de Leon Park; Atlanta, GA (rivalry)	L 0–44	
November 14	Sewanee	Ponce de Leon Park; Atlanta, GA	L 0–6	
November 19	at Mercer	Central City Park; Macon, GA	W 16–6	
November 26	Clemson	Ponce de Leon Park; Atlanta, GA (rivalry)	W 30–6	
*Non-conference game

== Before the season ==
The University of Georgia attacked Tech's recruitment tactics in football. UGA alumni incited a Southern Intercollegiate Athletic Association investigation into Tech's recruitment of a player UGA had recruited as well. The Georgia Alumni claimed that Tech had created a fraudulent scholarship fund, which they used to persuade the player to attend Tech rather than UGA. The SIAA ruled in favor of Tech, but the 1908 game was canceled that season due to bad blood between the rivals.
