= Nathan Dougherty =

American athlete, coach, and educator (1886–1977)

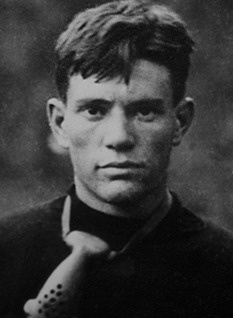
- Dougherty with his nose protection around his neck

Biographical details
- Born: March 23, 1886; Hales Mill, Virginia, U.S.
- Died: May 18, 1977 (aged 91); Knoxville, Tennessee, U.S.

Playing career

Football
- 1906–1909: Tennessee

Basketball
- 1908–1909: Tennessee
- Position: Guard (football)

Coaching career (HC unless noted)

Basketball
- 1914–1915: George Washington

Head coaching record
- Overall: 5–9

Accomplishments and honors

Awards
- All-Southern (1908); AP Southeast All-Time football team (1869–1919 era); Tennessee Athletics Hall of Fame
- College Football Hall of Fame; Inducted in 1967 (profile)

Nathan Washington "Big'n" Dougherty (March 23, 1886 – May 18, 1977) was an American college football player for the Tennessee Volunteers football team. He later became the Dean of the College of Engineering at the University of Tennessee and chairman of its Athletic Council. For this as well as his playing days Dougherty is "considered by many to be the founding father of UT Athletics." Dougherty was inducted into the College Football Hall of Fame in 1967, and was a unanimous choice for the Associated Press Southeast Area All-Time football team 1869–1919 era.

== Playing career ==
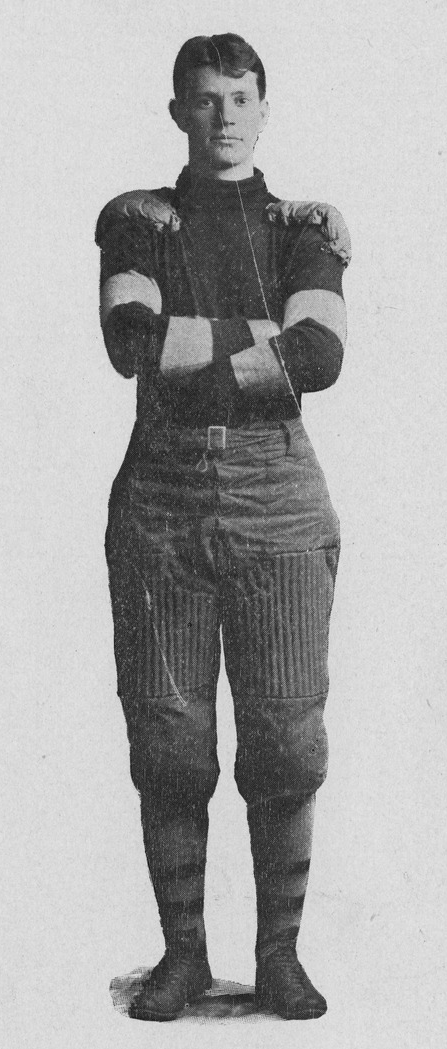
Dougherty c. 1909.

Dougherty played guard for the Tennessee Volunteers from 1906 to 1909, standing 6-foot-2 and weighing 185 pounds. Dougherty was a standout in the sport before it became wildly popular around the country. Of the few accolades that were bestowed on individuals, Dougherty was an honoree. He was named to the All Southern team in 1907 and 1908. The 1908 team was widely considered the best Tennessee football season up to that point. The backfield included Walker Leach. Vanderbilt coach Dan McGugin noted "All things considered, Leach was perhaps the best football player of the year in Dixie." He was captain of the football team in 1909.

Dougherty was captain of the Tennessee Volunteers men's basketball team in 1908–09.

== Engineering ==
Dougherty received his Bachelor of Science in civil engineering from the University of Tennessee in 1909 and his Master's degree from Cornell University in 1914. He briefly worked as a rodman for the Wasioto and Black Mountain Railroad before pursuing a career in academia. He worked as a special assistant for the Bureau of Public Roads from 1921 to 1923 and the Tennessee Department of Highways and Public Works from 1923 to 1933. He was also a member of the Tennessee Board of Examiners for Engineers and Architects. From 1943 to 1945, he was a director of the American Society of Civil Engineers. From 1954 to 1955, he was president of the American Society for Engineering Education.

== Academia ==
Dougherty was an instructor in civil engineering at Cornell University from 1910 to 1914. He then served as an assistant professor of civil engineering at George Washington University. He coached the GW's basketball team during the 1914–15 season, and compiled a 5–9 record. In 1916, he joined the faculty at the University of Tennessee as an associate professor. He became a full professor three years later and was dean of the University of Tennessee College of Engineering at Knoxville from 1940 until his retirement in 1956. An engineering building at the school is named after him. The building caught fire in November 2006, but was later reopened.

== Athletic administration ==
Dougherty was chairman of the UT Athletic Council from 1917 until his retirement in 1956. He was instrumental in the establishment of the Southern Conference, being its first secretary-treasurer. He was president of the conference from 1929 to 1930. From 1947 to 1950, he was a member of the National Collegiate Athletic Association's executive committee.

In 1947, Dougherty was elected acting commissioner of the Southeastern Conference after Mike Conner was granted a leave of absence due to illness. Conner resigned on September 12, 1947. Dougherty continued to serve as acting commissioner until Bernie Moore was appointed in February 1948.

== Personal life and death ==
On September 9, 1913, Dougherty married Agnes Anna Monteith. They had three daughters and two sons. Dougherty died at a Knoxville nursing home on May 18, 1977.
