= Walker Leach =

American football player (1888–1944)

Profile
- Position: Halfback/End

Personal information
- Born: July 22, 1888; Virginia, U.S.
- Died: January 2, 1944 (aged 55); Tennessee, U.S.

Career information
- College: Tennessee (1905–1908)

Awards and highlights
- All-Southern (1908)

John Walker Leach (July 22, 1888 – January 2, 1944) was a college football player.

== University of Tennessee ==
He was a prominent, halfback, end and kicker for the Tennessee Volunteers of the University of Tennessee. At Tennessee, he was a member of Sigma Alpha Epsilon. He was once appointed alumni member of the Tennessee Athletic Council. He was nominated though not selected for an Associated Press All-Time Southeast 1869-1919 era team. In 1915, John Heisman selected his 30 greatest Southern football players. Leach was the only selection from Tennessee.

=== 1907 ===
Leach played at end in 1907.

=== 1908 ===
Leach was captain of the school's 1908 team which was widely considered the best Tennessee football season up to that point. That year Vanderbilt coach Dan McGugin noted "All things considered, Leach was perhaps the best football player of the year in Dixie." The team included College Football Hall of Fame guard Nathan Dougherty.

== See also ==
- 1908 College Football All-Southern Team
