= 1909 Southern Intercollegiate Athletic Association football season =

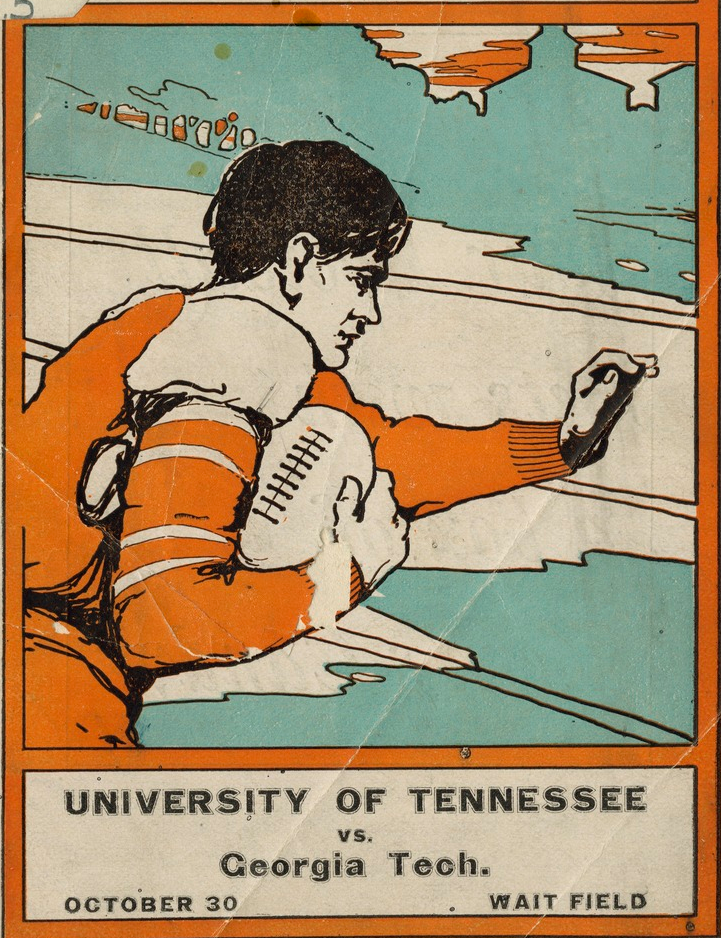
- League: NCAA
- Sport: College football
- Duration: September 25, 1909 through January 1, 1910
- Teams: 14

Regular Season
- Season champions: Sewanee

Football seasons
- 1908 1910

1909 Southern Intercollegiate Athletic Association football standings
	Conf.					Overall
Team	W		L		T	W		L		T
Sewanee $	4	–	0	–	0	6	–	1	–	0
Vanderbilt	4	–	1	–	0	7	–	3	–	0
Alabama	4	–	1	–	1	5	–	1	–	2
LSU	3	–	1	–	0	6	–	2	–	0
Georgia Tech	4	–	2	–	0	7	–	2	–	0
Auburn	4	–	2	–	0	5	–	2	–	0
Howard (AL)	2	–	2	–	0	5	–	2	–	1
Clemson	2	–	2	–	0	6	–	3	–	0
Ole Miss	1	–	2	–	1	4	–	3	–	2
Mississippi A&M	1	–	3	–	0	5	–	4	–	0
Georgia	1	–	4	–	1	1	–	4	–	2
The Citadel	0	–	1	–	1	3	–	3	–	2
Cumberland (TN)	0	–	1	–	0	0	–	1	–	0
Mercer	0	–	4	–	0	3	–	5	–	0
Tennessee	0	–	5	–	0	1	–	6	–	2
$ – Conference champion

The 1909 Southern Intercollegiate Athletic Association football season was the college football games played by the member schools of the Southern Intercollegiate Athletic Association as part of the 1909 college football season. The season began on September 25.

Under head coach Harris G. Cope, Sewanee won its last conference title in major college football. Sewanee gave Vanderbilt its first loss to a Southern team in six years, and was the first Sewanee squad to win a title since the 1899 Iron Men.

When the Kentucky team was welcomed home after the upset win over Illinois, Philip Carbusier said that they had "fought like wildcats", a nickname that stuck.

President Taft showed up for the Sewanee-LSU game. LSU was led by Hall of Fame quarterback Doc Fenton.

== Results and team statistics ==
Conf. Rank	Team	Head coach	Overall record	Conf. record	PPG	PAG
1	Sewanee	Harris Cope	6–1	4–0	22.9	6.0
2	Vanderbilt	Dan McGugin	7–3	4–1	21.0	3.2
3	Alabama	Doc Pollard	5–1–2	4–1–2	8.5	2.1
4	LSU	Joe Pritchard	6–2	3–1	23.5	4.6
5 (tie)	Georgia Tech	John Heisman	7–2	4–2	24.1	5.0
5 (tie)	Auburn	Mike Donahue	5–2	4–2	16.7	5.6
7	Howard	John B. Longwell	5–2–1	2–2	13.4	3.7
8	Clemson	Bob Williams	6–3	2–2	10.3	4.8
9	Mississippi	Nathan Stauffer	4–3–2	1-2–1	11.0	5.4
10	Mississippi A&M	W. D. Chadwick	5–4	1–3	17.0	4.9
11	Georgia	James Coulter/Frank Dobson	1–4–2	1–4–1	2.0	6.9
12	The Citadel	Sam Costen	4–3–2	0–1–1	18.4	6.4
13	Cumberland (TN)		0–1	0–1		
14	Mercer	Frank Blake	3–5	0–4	8.0	3.9
15	Tennessee	George Levene	1–6–2	0–5	1.2	12.6

Key

PPG = Average of points scored per game
PAG = Average of points allowed per game

== Regular season ==
Index to colors and formatting
Non-conference matchup; SIAA member won
Non-conference matchup; SIAA member lost
Non-conference matchup; tie
Conference matchup

SIAA teams in bold.

=== Week One ===
Date	Visiting team	Home team	Site	Result	Attendance	Reference
September 25	Gordon	**Mercer**	Central City Park • Macon, GA	**L** 0–10		
September 25	Southwestern Presbyterian	**Vanderbilt**	Dudley Field • Nashville, TN	**W** 52–0		
September 27	Gordon	**Clemson**	Bowman Field • Calhoun, SC	**W** 26–0		

=== Week Two ===
Date	Visiting team	Home team	Site	Result	Attendance	Reference
October 2	Central University	**Tennessee**	Waite Field • Knoxville, TN	**T** 0–0		
October 2	**The Citadel**	College of Charleston	Charleston, SC	**W** 36–0		
October 2	Union (TN)	**Alabama**	The Quad • Tuscaloosa, AL	**W** 16–0		
October 2	**Howard (AL)**	**Auburn**	Baseball Field • Montgomery, AL	**AUB** 11–0		
October 2	Gordon	**Georgia Tech**	Piedmont Park • Atlanta, GA	**W** 18–6		
October 2	Memphis University School	**Ole Miss**	Oxford, MS	**W** 18–0		
October 2	**Clemson**	VPI	Miles Field • Blacksburg, VA	**L** 0–6		
October 2	Jackson Barracks	**LSU**	State Field • Baton Rouge, LA	**W** 70–0		
October 2	**Mercer**	**Vanderbilt**	Dudley Field • Nashville, TN	**VAN** 32–0		
October 2	Birmingham	**Mississippi A&M**	Hardy Field • Starkville, MS	**W** 21–0		

=== Week Three ===
Date	Visiting team	Home team	Site	Result	Attendance	Reference
October 5	University of Memphis	**Ole Miss**	Oxford, MS	**W** 15–0		
October 9	**Howard (AL)**	**Alabama**	The Quad • Tuscaloosa, AL	**ALA** 14–0		
October 9	Gordon	**Auburn**	Drill Field • Auburn, AL	**W** 46–0		
October 9	**Clemson**	Davidson	Latta Park • Charlotte, NC	**W** 17–5		
October 9	**Georgia**	**The Citadel**	College Park Stadium • Charleston, SC	**T** 0–0		
October 9	Mooney	**Georgia Tech**	Piedmont Park • Atlanta, GA	**W** 35–6		
October 9	**Cumberland**	**Mississippi A&M**	Hardy Field • Starkville, MS	**MSAM** 34–6		
October 9	**Ole Miss**	**LSU**	State Field • Baton Rouge, LA	**LSU** 10–0		
October 9	Southwestern Presbyterian	**Sewanee**	Hardee Field • Sewanee, TN	**W** 64–0		
October 9	North Carolina	**Tennessee**	Waite Field • Knoxville, TN	**L** 0–3		
October 9	Rose Polytechnic	**Vanderbilt**	Dudley Field • Nashville, TN	**W** 28–3		

=== Week Four ===
Date	Visiting team	Home team	Site	Result	Attendance	Reference
October 15	Jacksonville State	**Howard (AL)**	West End Park • Birmingham, AL	**W** 33–0		
October 15	Davidson	**Georgia**	Herty Field • Athens, GA	**T** 0–0		
October 16	**Auburn**	**Mercer**	Central City Park • Macon, GA	**AUB** 23–5		
October 16	**Clemson**	**Alabama**	Birmingham Fairgrounds • Birmingham, AL	**ALA** 3–0		
October 16	Port Royal Marines	**The Citadel**	College Park Stadium • Charleston, SC	**L** 5–17		
October 16	South Carolina	**Georgia Tech**	Ponce de Leon Park • Atlanta, GA	**W** 59–0		
October 16	**Sewanee**	Princeton	University Field • Princeton, NJ	**L** 0–20		
October 16	**Mississippi A&M**	**LSU**	State Field • Baton Rouge, LA	**LSU** 15–0		
October 16	**Tennessee**	Kentucky State College	Lexington, KY	**L** 0–17	2,000	
October 16	Vanderbilt Alumni	**Vanderbilt**	Dudley Field • Nashville, TN	**L** 0–3		
October 16	**Ole Miss**	Tulane	Pelican Park • New Orleans, LA	**L** 0–5		

=== Week Five ===
Date	Visiting team	Home team	Site	Result	Attendance	Reference
October 22	Southwestern Presbyterian	Mississippi A&M	Columbus Fairgrounds • Columbus, MS	**W** 31–0		
October 23	**Alabama**	Ole Miss	Mississippi State Fairgrounds • Jackson, MS	**T** 0–0		
October 23	Port Royal Marines	Clemson	Bowman Field • Calhoun, SC	**W** 19–0		
October 23	**Georgia**	Tennessee	Waite Field • Knoxville, TN	**UGA** 3–0		
October 23	**Howard (AL)**	Mercer	Central City Park • Macon, GA	**HOW** 6–5		
October 23	**Sewanee**	Georgia Tech	Ponce de Leon Park • Atlanta, GA	**GT** 15–0		
October 23	**Auburn**	Vanderbilt	Dudley Field • Nashville, TN	**VAN** 17–0		

=== Week Six ===
Date	Visiting team	Home team	Site	Result	Attendance	Reference
October 30	**Alabama**	**Georgia**	Ponce de Leon Park • Atlanta, GA	**ALA** 14–0		
October 30	**Georgia Tech**	**Tennessee**	Waite Field • Knoxville, TN	**GT** 29–0		
October 30	**Sewanee**	**LSU**	Pelican Park • New Orleans, LA	**SEW** 15–6	4,200–7,000	
October 30	**Mississippi A&M**	Tulane	Tulane Stadium • New Orleans, LA	**L** 0–2		
October 30	**Ole Miss**	**Vanderbilt**	Dudley Field • Nashville, TN	**VAN** 17–0		
October 30	**Howard (AL)**	Chattanooga	Chamberlain Field • Chattanooga, TN	**T** 0–0		
October 30	Porter Military Academy	**The Citadel**	Charleston, SC	**W** 80–0		

=== Week Seven ===
Date	Visiting team	Home team	Site	Result	Attendance	Reference
November 2	Union (TN)	**Mississippi A&M**	Columbus Fairgrounds • Columbus, MS	**W** 25–0		
November 3	Davidson	**The Citadel**	Fairgrounds • Columbia, SC	**T** 0–0		
November 4	**Clemson**	South Carolina	Fairgrounds • Columbia, SC	**W** 6–0		
November 4	Louisiana Industrial	**LSU**	Ball Park • Alexandria, LA	**W** 23–0	1,200	
November 6	Chattanooga	**Mercer**	Central City Park • Macon, GA	**W** 10–2		
November 6	**Auburn**	**Georgia Tech**	Ponce de Leon Park • Atlanta, GA	**AUB** 9–0		
November 6	**Tennessee**	**Vanderbilt**	Dudley Field • Nashville, TN	**VAN** 51–0		
November 8	**Mississippi A&M**	**Howard (AL)**	West End Park • Birmingham, AL	**HOW** 6–0		
November 8	Castle Heights	**Sewanee**	Hardee Field • Sewanee, TN	**W** 38–0		

=== Week Eight ===
Date	Visiting team	Home team	Site	Result	Attendance	Reference
November 10	**Clemson**	**Georgia**	Augusta, GA	**CLEM** 5–0		
November 12	**Ole Miss**	Henderson	Arkadelphia, AR	**T** 12–12		
November 13	**Alabama**	**Tennessee**	Waite Field • Knoxville, TN	**TENN** 10–0		
November 13	Arkansas	**LSU**	Red Elm Park • Memphis, TN	**L** 0–16		
November 13	**Clemson**	**The Citadel**	College Park Stadium • Charleston, SC	**CLEM** 17–0		
November 13	**Georgia Tech**	**Mercer**	Central City Park • Macon, GA	**GT** 35–0		
November 13	Chattanooga	**Mississippi A&M**	Hardy Field • Starkville, MS	**W** 37–6		
November 13	**Sewanee**	**Auburn**	West End Park • Birmingham, AL	**SEW** 12–11		
November 13	**Vanderbilt**	Ohio State	University Park • Columbus, OH	**L** 0–5		

=== Week Nine ===
Date	Visiting team	Home team	Site	Result	Attendance	Reference
November 17	Union (TN)	**Ole Miss**	Oxford, MS	**W** 45–0		
November 18	Transylvania	**LSU**	State Field • Baton Rouge, LA	**W** 52–0		
November 20	**Georgia**	**Georgia Tech**	Ponce de Leon Park • Atlanta, GA	**GT** 12–6		
November 20	**Alabama**	Tulane	Tulane Stadium • New Orleans, LA	**T** 5–5		
November 20	**The Citadel**	College of Charleston	Charleston, SC	**W** 21–6		
November 20	South Carolina	**Mercer**	Central City Park • Macon, GA	**W** 5–3		
November 20	Birmingham	**Howard (AL)**	West End Park • Birmingham, AL	**W** 26–0		
November 20	**Tennessee**	Chattanooga	Chamberlain Field • Chattanooga, TN	**T** 0–0		
November 20	**Vanderbilt**	Washington University	Francis Field • St. Louis, MO	**W** 12–0	5,000	

=== Week Ten ===
Date	Visiting team	Home team	Site	Result	Attendance	Reference
November 25	**LSU**	Alabama	Birmingham Fairgrounds • Birmingham, AL	**LSU** 12–6		
November 25	**Clemson**	Georgia Tech	Ponce de Leon Park • Atlanta, GA	**GT** 29–3		
November 25	**Georgia**	Auburn	Montgomery, AL	**AUB** 17–5		
November 25	**Ole Miss**	Mississippi A&M	Mississippi State Fairgrounds • Jackson, MS	**MISS** 9–5		
November 25	**Sewanee**	Vanderbilt	Dudley Field • Nashville, TN	**SEW** 16–5		
November 25	South Carolina	The Citadel	College Park Stadium • Charleston, SC	**L** 5–11	1,600	
November 25	Transylvania	Tennessee	Waite Field • Knoxville, TN	**W** 11–0		
November 25	Georgetown (KY)	Howard	West End Park • Birmingham, AL	**W** 11–0		
November 25	Norman Park	Mercer	Central City Park • Macon, GA	**W** 26–0		

== Awards and honors ==
=== All-Southern team ===
John Heisman's All-Southern team included:

Position	Name	Team
QB	Doc Fenton	LSU
HB	Aubrey Lanier	Sewanee
HB	Ray Morrison	Vanderbilt
FB	Will Metzger	Vanderbilt
E	Silas Williams	Sewanee
T	Harry Esslinger	Auburn
G	Eric Cheape	Sewanee
C	J. E. Lucas	Georgia
G	T. C. Locke	Auburn
T	Malvern Griffin	Vanderbilt
E	Ewing Y. Freeland	Vanderbilt
