= 1909 College Football All-Southern Team =

American all-star college football team

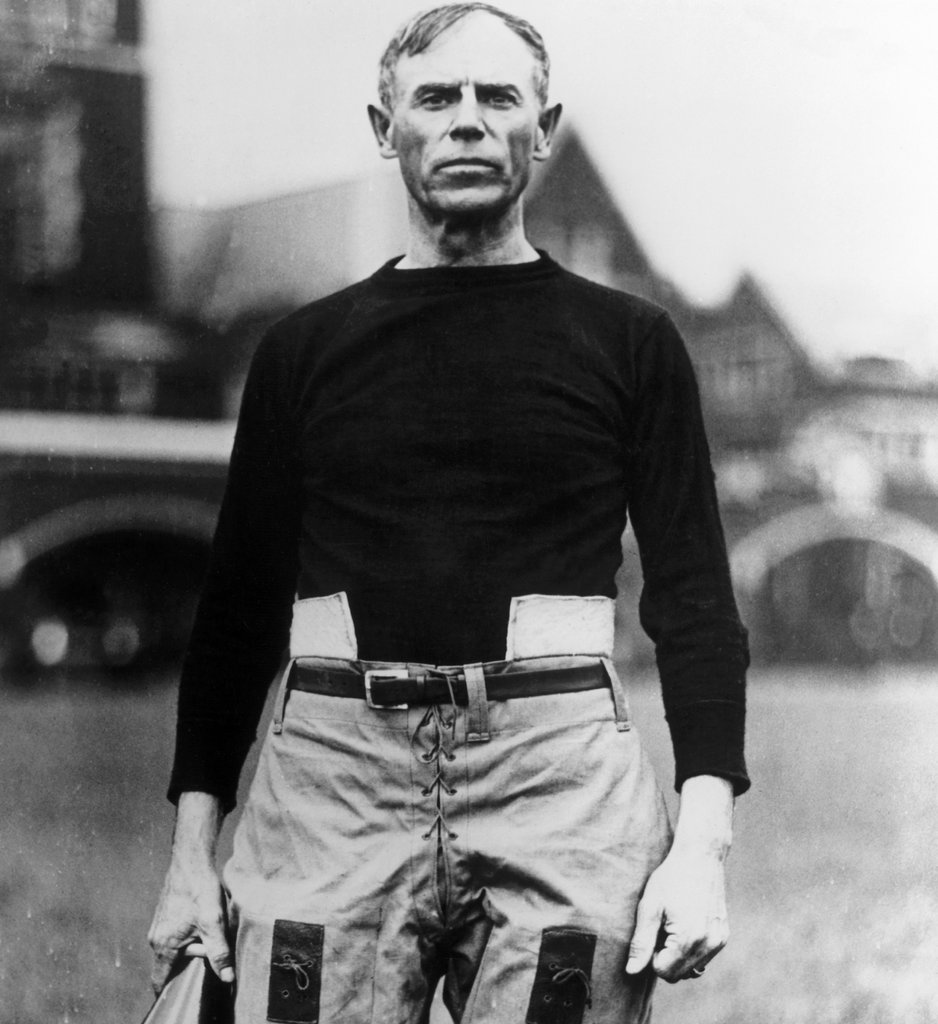
Coach Heisman.

The 1909 College Football All-Southern Team consists of American football players selected to the College Football All-Southern Teams selected by various organizations for the 1909 Southern Intercollegiate Athletic Association football season. Sewanee won the SIAA championship. VPI, an independent school, also claims a Southern championship.

== Heisman's eleven ==
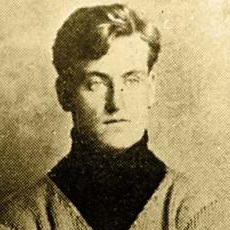
Doc Fenton

The eleven selected by John Heisman included:

- Eric Cheape, guard for Sewanee.
- Harry Esslinger, tackle for Auburn. He was a pioneer coach at Huntsville High School. He served in that capacity from 1920 to 1932.
- Doc Fenton, quarterback for LSU, inducted into the College Football Hall of Fame in 1971.
- Ewing Y. Freeland, end for Vanderbilt, known as "Big 'un," later coached at various institutions in Texas.
- Malvern Griffin, tackle for Vanderbilt.
- Aubrey Lanier, halfback for Sewanee. Grantland Rice called him "the noblest Tiger of them all." The Kappa Alpha Journal gives similar praise that year, calling Lanier "The greatest performer of the college game on the Southern field.
- T. C. Locke, guard for Auburn.
- J. E. Lucas, center for Georgia. His defense drew praise in the losses to Alabama and Georgia Tech.
- Will Metzger, guard for Vanderbilt, known as "Frog," selected for an Associated Press Southeast Area All-Time football team 1869-1919 era.
- Ray Morrison, quarterback for Vanderbilt, selected as the quarterback and kick returner for an Associated Press Southeast Area All-Time football team 1869-1919 era. He was later a coach at various institutions including SMU and Vanderbilt after McGugin. He was inducted into the College Football Hall of Fame as a coach in 1954.
- Silas Williams, end for Sewanee. He later played for Harvard Law School.

== All-Southerns of 1909 ==
=== Ends ===
- Silas Williams†, Sewanee (H-1, GR, NB, NTC, NTL, NTM)
- Ewing Y. Freeland, Vanderbilt (H-1, NB, NTL)
- Bill Neely, Vanderbilt (GR, NB [as qb], NTC, NTL [as qb], NTM [as qb])
- Carlton Elliott, Virginia (WG)
- Joe Luttrell, VPI (WG)
- Armstrong Hill, Auburn (H-2)
- Herbert Hatcher, Georgia (H-2)

=== Tackles ===
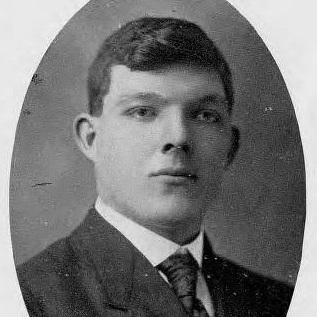
Harry Esslinger

- Malvern Griffin, Vanderbilt (H-1, NB, NTL, NTM)
- Harry Esslinger, Auburn (H-1)
- Lionel Moise, Sewanee (GR, NB [as fb], NTC, NTL)
- Frank Faulkinberry, Sewanee (H-2, NB [as g], NTC, NTM)
- Homer Cogdell, Auburn (GR, NB)
- B. R. Cecil, Virginia (WG)
- Horace Geyer Jr., Virginia (WG)

=== Guards ===
- Eric Cheape, Sewanee (H-1, GR, NTC)
- T. C. Locke, Auburn (H-1, NTL)
- Ted Ross, Vanderbilt (GR, NTC, NTL, NTM)
- Willie Hillman, LSU (NB [as c], NTM)
- Stanley Phillip, Arkansas (NB)
- Bruce, Washington & Lee (WG)
- Hoss Hodgson, VPI (WG)
- Burton Gray Allen, Auburn (H-2)
- Leslie Covington, Vanderbilt (H-2)

=== Centers ===
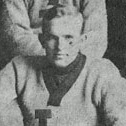
Robert L. Stovall

- J. E. Lucas, Georgia (H-1)
- Robert "Strauss" Stovall, LSU (GR, NTL, NTM)
- Frank Juhan, Sewanee (NTC)
- Archibald Deans, North Carolina (WG)
- J. J. Beaver, Auburn (H-2)

=== Quarterbacks ===
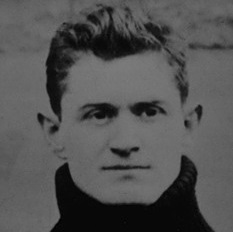
Ray Morrison

- Doc Fenton, LSU (College Football Hall of Fame) (H-1)
- Chigger Browne, Sewanee (GR, H-2, NTC)
- S. F. Stevens, North Carolina A&M (WG)

=== Halfbacks ===
- Aubrey Lanier, Sewanee (H-1, GR, NB, NTC, NTL)
- Ray Morrison, Vanderbilt (College Football Hall of Fame) (H-1, NTL, NTM [as e])
- Lew Hardage, Auburn (GR, H-2, NB, NTC, NTM)
- Forest Stanton, Virginia (WG)
- Tom Moseley, VMI (WG)
- Del Pratt, Alabama (H-2)

=== Fullbacks ===
- Will Metzger, Vanderbilt (H-1, NTL, NTM)
- John Seip, LSU (GR, H-2 [as t], NTC)
- Kemper Yancey, Virginia (WG)
- George Penton, Auburn (H-2)

== Key ==
† = Unanimous selection

Bold = Heisman's pick

H = selected by John Heisman, coach at Georgia Institute of Technology. Dick Jemison picked a second team from the players Heisman left off his first.

GR = selected by Grantland Rice.

NB = selected by Nash Buckingham.

NTC = published in the Nashville Tennessean, by a writer from Columbia.

NTL = published in the Nashville Tennessean, by a writer from Lynnville.

NTM = published in the Nashville Tennessean, by a writer from McMinnville.

WG = selected by William C. Gloth, coach at Virginia Military Institute.

== See also ==
- 1909 College Football All-America Team
