= Harris G. Cope =

American athlete and football coach (1880–1924)

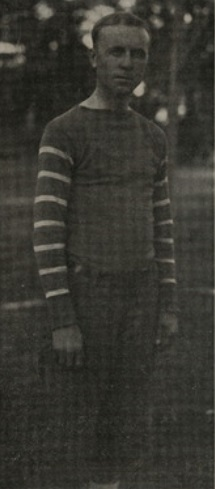
- Cope, c. 1913

Biographical details
- Born: March 16, 1880; Savannah, Georgia, U.S.
- Died: September 24, 1924 (aged 44); Birmingham, Alabama, U.S.

Playing career

Football
- 1899–1901: Sewanee
- Positions: Quarterback (football); Third baseman (baseball)

Coaching career (HC unless noted)

Football
- 1904: Sewanee (assistant)
- 1909–1916: Sewanee
- 1922–1923: Howard (AL)

Administrative career (AD unless noted)
- 1909–1913: Sewanee
- 1922–1924: Howard (AL)

Head coaching record
- Overall: 48–28–12

Accomplishments and honors

Championships
- 1 SIAA (1909)

Harris Goodwin Cope (March 16, 1880 – September 24, 1924) was an American football and baseball player and football coach. He served as the head football coach at Sewanee: The University of the South in Sewanee, Tennessee from 1909 to 1916 and Howard College—now known as Samford University—in Marion, Alabama from 1922 to 1923, compiling a career college football head coaching record of 48–28–12. Cope was a member of the National Football Rules Committee in 1914–15.

== Early life and playing career ==
Cope first played at the Taft School in Watertown, Connecticut.

=== Sewanee ===
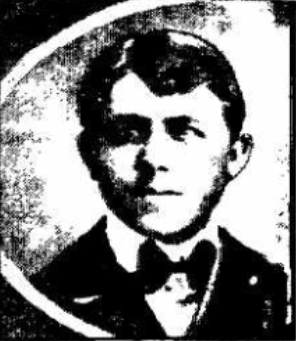
Cope c. 1901

In his first year of varsity football, Cope was a substitute quarterback on the undefeated "Iron Men" of the 1899 Sewanee Tigers football team. He was the captain and the starting quarter for Sewanee's 1901 team.

Cope played third base on the Sewanee baseball team.

== Coaching career ==
Cope worked for a short time as a business man in Cartersville before returning to Sewanee to coach in 1909. For many years, he returned to Cartersville during the off-seasons to manage the Cartersville Colts semi-professional men’s baseball team.

=== Sewanee ===
Cope has the third-most wins of any Sewanee coach (43), behind Shirley Majors' 93 and John Windham's 45; and has the highest winning percentage of any Sewanee coach who coached for more than 3 seasons. His continuity came after a period in which Sewanee had much talent but six coaches in seven years.

==== 1909 ====
In Cope's first year at head coach he led the Sewanee Tigers to a Southern Intercollegiate Athletic Association (SIAA) championship in 1909, beating previous season's champion LSU and handing Vanderbilt its first loss to a Southern team in six years.

=== Howard ===
Former Sewanee player Bob Taylor Dobbins assisted Cope at Howard. Cope was also a very astute golfer, playing in club tournaments during his off-seasons.

== Death ==
Cope died of pneumonia in Birmingham, Alabama, on September 24, 1924, just before the start of Howard's football season.

== Legacy ==
Cope's disciples include:

- Bob Taylor Dobbins, played for Sewanee (1913–1915), assistant for Howard (1922–1923)
- Frank Faulkinberry, played for Sewanee (1907–1910), head coach for Middle Tennessee State (1926–1932)
- Jenks Gillem, played for Sewanee (1910–1912), head coach for Howard (1925–1926), Birmingham–Southern (1928–1939), head coach for Sewanee (1940–1941)
- Frank Juhan, played for Sewanee (1908–1910), assistant for Sewanee (1913–1915)
- Henry D. Phillips, assistant for Sewanee (1909–1915)
- Silas Williams, played for Sewanee (1908–1909), assistant for Sewanee (1914–1915), head coach for Chattanooga (1919–1921)

== Head coaching record ==
Year	Team	Overall	Conference	Standing	Bowl/playoffs
Sewanee Tigers (Southern Intercollegiate Athletic Association) (1909–1916)
1909	Sewanee	6–1	5–0	1st	
1910	Sewanee	8–2	3–1	T–3rd	
1911	Sewanee	6–3–1	2–3	9th	
1912	Sewanee	5–1–2	2–1–2	5th	
1913	Sewanee	4–3	2–2	7th	
1914	Sewanee	5–3	4–2	5th	
1915	Sewanee	4–3–2	2–2–2	10th	
1916	Sewanee	5–2–2	2–2–2	14th	
Sewanee:		43–18–7	22–14–6		
Howard Bulldogs (Southern Intercollegiate Athletic Association) (1922–1923)
1922	Howard	2–6–2	0–2		
1923	Howard	3–4–3	1–3–1		
Howard:		5–10–5	1–5–1		
Total:		48–28–12			
National championship Conference title Conference division title or championship game berth
