= J. E. Lucas =

American football center

Profile
- Position: Center

Personal information
- Born: c. 1887; Waverly Hall, Georgia
- Listed weight: 169 lb (77 kg)

Career information
- College: Georgia (1907–1909)

Awards and highlights
- All-Southern (1909)

James E. Lucas was a college football and baseball player.

== University of Georgia ==
He was a prominent center for the Georgia Bulldogs football team of the University of Georgia.

=== 1909 ===
In 1909, his defense drew praise in the losses to Alabama and Georgia Tech. Lucas was selected All-Southern.

He was elected captain of the baseball team in 1910.
