= Ed Finlay =

American football player and referee

Edward Finlay was a college football player and referee. He played at the University of Virginia and Sewanee: The University of the South, a member of the latter's 1909 team. He played as an end, opposite Silas Williams.
