= 1909 Ole Miss Rebels football team =

American college football season

1909 Ole Miss Rebels football
- Conference: Southern Intercollegiate Athletic Association
- Record: 4–3–2 (1–2–1 SIAA)
- Head coach: Nathan Stauffer (1st season)
- Captain: J. W. McCall

1909 Southern Intercollegiate Athletic Association football standings
	Conf.					Overall
Team	W		L		T	W		L		T
Sewanee $	4	–	0	–	0	6	–	1	–	0
Vanderbilt	4	–	1	–	0	7	–	3	–	0
Alabama	4	–	1	–	1	5	–	1	–	2
LSU	3	–	1	–	0	6	–	2	–	0
Georgia Tech	4	–	2	–	0	7	–	2	–	0
Auburn	4	–	2	–	0	5	–	2	–	0
Howard (AL)	2	–	2	–	0	5	–	2	–	1
Clemson	2	–	2	–	0	6	–	3	–	0
Ole Miss	1	–	2	–	1	4	–	3	–	2
Mississippi A&M	1	–	3	–	0	5	–	4	–	0
Georgia	1	–	4	–	1	1	–	4	–	2
The Citadel	0	–	1	–	1	3	–	3	–	2
Cumberland (TN)	0	–	1	–	0	0	–	1	–	0
Mercer	0	–	4	–	0	3	–	5	–	0
Tennessee	0	–	5	–	0	1	–	6	–	2
$ – Conference champion

The 1909 Ole Miss Rebels football team represented the University of Mississippi during the 1909 college football season. Under first year head coach Nathan Stauffer, the team posted a 4–3–2. In the 9 to 5 victory in the Egg Bowl, Earl Kinnebrew was called by the Jackson Clarion-Ledger "the particular star of his team."

== Schedule ==
Date	Time	Opponent	Site	Result	Source
October 2		Memphis University School*	Oxford, MS	W 18–0	
October 6		University of Memphis*	Oxford, MS	W 15–0	
October 9		at LSU	State Field; Baton Rouge, LA (rivalry)	L 0–10	
October 16	3:30 p.m.	at Tulane*	Pelican Park; New Orleans, LA (rivalry)	L 0–5	
October 23		vs. Alabama	Mississippi State Fairgrounds; Jackson, MS (rivalry)	T 0–0	
October 30		at Vanderbilt	Dudley Field; Nashville, TN (rivalry)	L 0–17	
November 12		at Henderson*	Arkadelphia, AR	T 12–12	
November 17		Union (TN)*	Oxford, MS	W 45–0	
November 25		vs. Mississippi A&M	Mississippi State Fairgrounds; Jackson, MS (rivalry)	W 9–5	
*Non-conference game; All times are in Central time
