= James Coulter =

James Coulter may refer to:

- James Coulter (Doctors), a fictional character from Doctors
- James Coulter (financier) (born 1959), private equity investor
- Joseph Coulter (American football) (1880–1943), American football coach, sometimes referred to as "James Coulter"
