= Essinger =

Essinger is a surname of German origin, originating as a habitational name for someone from any of the places called Essing or Essingen. Notable people with the surname include:

- Anna Essinger (1879-1960), German educator
- James Essinger (born 1957), British freelance writer and author

== See also ==
- Mount Essinger, a mountain in the Royal Society Range of Victoria Land, Antarctica
- Esslinger (disambiguation)
