= 1909 Case football team =

American college football season

1909 Case football
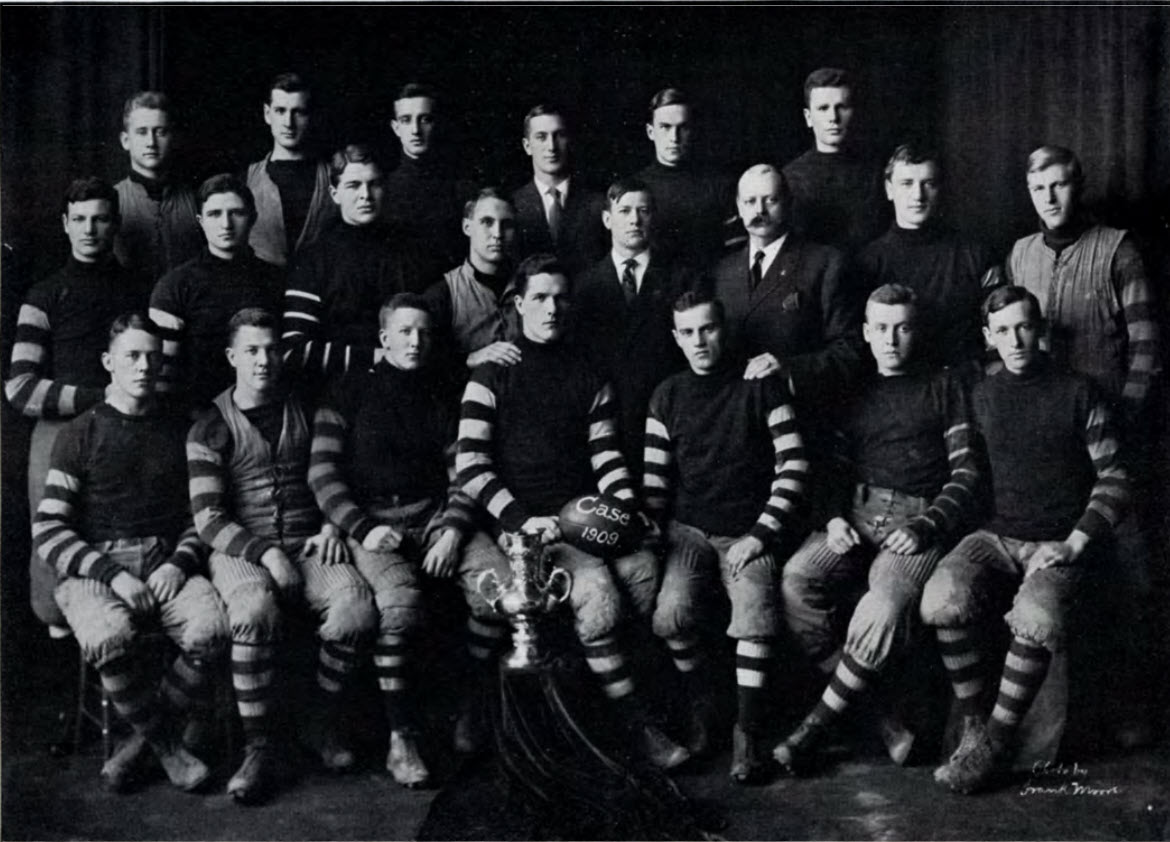
- Conference: Ohio Athletic Conference
- Record: 6–1–2 (5–0–2 OAC)
- Head coach: Joe Fogg (3rd season)

1909 Ohio Athletic Conference football standings
	Conf.					Overall
Team	W		L		T	W		L		T
Oberlin $	4	–	0	–	1	5	–	1	–	1
Case	5	–	0	–	2	6	–	1	–	2
Ohio State	5	–	2	–	0	7	–	3	–	0
Western Reserve	2	–	1	–	1	5	–	3	–	1
Kenyon	4	–	4	–	0	6	–	4	–	0
Denison	3	–	3	–	0	4	–	5	–	1
Ohio Wesleyan	2	–	4	–	0	5	–	4	–	0
Wittenberg	1	–	3	–	0	3	–	6	–	0
Wooster	1	–	5	–	0	1	–	6	–	0
Heidelberg	0	–	5	–	0	0	–	8	–	1
$ – Conference champion

The 1909 Case football team represented the Case School of Applied Science, now a part of Case Western Reserve University, during the 1909 college football season. The team was led by head coach Joe Fogg and assistant coach Peggy Parratt. Case compiled a 6–1–2 record outscoring their opponents 141–32.

== Schedule ==
Date	Opponent	Site	Result
September 25	Mount Union*	Van Horn Field; Cleveland, OH	W 27–5
October 2	Denison	Van Horn Field; Cleveland, OH	W 24–0
October 9	at Michigan*	Ferry Field; Ann Arbor, MI	L 0–3
October 16	Wooster	Van Horn Field; Cleveland, OH	W 21–5
October 23	at Oberlin	Dill Field; Oberlin, OH	T 0–0
October 30	Kenyon	Van Horn Field; Cleveland, OH	W 32–11
November 6	at Ohio State	Ohio Field; Columbus, OH	W 11–3
November 13	Ohio Wesleyan	Van Horn Field; Cleveland, OH	W 21–0
November 23	Western Reserve	Van Horn Field; Cleveland, OH	T 5–5
*Non-conference game
