= Esslingen =

Esslingen may refer to:

== Places ==
- Esslingen (district), a district (Landkreis) of Baden-Württemberg in southern Germany
- Esslingen am Neckar, capital city of the district of Esslingen
- Esslingen, Switzerland, a village in Switzerland
- Eßlingen, a municipality in western Germany

== Other ==
- Maschinenfabrik Esslingen, a former locomotive manufacturing company based in Esslingen am Neckar

== See also ==
- Esslinger (disambiguation)
