= Malvern Griffin =

American football player (1889–1950)

Profile
- Position: Tackle

Personal information
- Born: June 21, 1889; Hertford, North Carolina
- Died: June 12, 1950 (aged 53); Huntsville, Alabama

Career information
- College: Vanderbilt (1909)

Awards and highlights
- All-Southern (1909)

Malvern Ulysses Griffin (June 21, 1889 – June 12, 1950) was a college football player.

== Vanderbilt University ==
He was a prominent tackle for the Vanderbilt Commodores football team of Vanderbilt University.

=== 1909 ===
Griffin was selected All-Southern by John Heisman in 1909.

== University of Alabama ==
He later attended the University of Alabama.
