= 1909 Sewanee Tigers football team =

American college football season

1909 Sewanee Tigers football

SIAA champion
- Conference: Southern Intercollegiate Athletic Association
- Record: 6–1 (4–0 SIAA)
- Head coach: Harris G. Cope (1st season)
- Assistant coaches: Henry D. Phillips; Edward Dillon
- Captain: Silas Williams
- Home stadium: Hardee Field

1909 Southern Intercollegiate Athletic Association football standings
	Conf.					Overall
Team	W		L		T	W		L		T
Sewanee $	4	–	0	–	0	6	–	1	–	0
Vanderbilt	4	–	1	–	0	7	–	3	–	0
Alabama	4	–	1	–	1	5	–	1	–	2
LSU	3	–	1	–	0	6	–	2	–	0
Georgia Tech	4	–	2	–	0	7	–	2	–	0
Auburn	4	–	2	–	0	5	–	2	–	0
Howard (AL)	2	–	2	–	0	5	–	2	–	1
Clemson	2	–	2	–	0	6	–	3	–	0
Ole Miss	1	–	2	–	1	4	–	3	–	2
Mississippi A&M	1	–	3	–	0	5	–	4	–	0
Georgia	1	–	4	–	1	1	–	4	–	2
The Citadel	0	–	1	–	1	3	–	3	–	2
Cumberland (TN)	0	–	1	–	0	0	–	1	–	0
Mercer	0	–	4	–	0	3	–	5	–	0
Tennessee	0	–	5	–	0	1	–	6	–	2
$ – Conference champion

The 1909 Sewanee Tigers football team represented Sewanee: The University of the South during the 1909 Southern Intercollegiate Athletic Association football season. The team was coached by Harris G. Cope in his 1st year as head coach, compiling a record of 6–1 (5–0 SIAA) and outscoring opponents 160 to 42 to win the Southern Intercollegiate Athletic Association title. Sewanee beat the previous season's champions LSU and Auburn, and upset rival Vanderbilt, handing the school its first loss to a Southern team in six years.

== Before the season ==
The Tigers hired new head coach Harris Cope, a former Sewanee quarterback. Assisting Cope was former Sewanee fullback and guard Henry D. Phillips; and former Princeton quarterback Edward Dillon.

== Schedule ==
Date	Opponent	Site	Result	Attendance	Source
October 9	Southwestern Presbyterian*	Hardee Field; Sewanee, TN (rivalry)	W 64–0		
October 16	at Princeton*	University Field; Princeton, NJ	L 0–20		
October 23	at Georgia Tech	Ponce de Leon Park; Atlanta, GA	W 15–0		
October 30	vs. LSU	Pelican Park; New Orleans, LA	W 15–6	4,200–7,000	
November 8	Castle Heights*	Hardee Field; Sewanee, TN	W 38–0		
November 13	at Auburn	West End Park; Birmingham, AL	W 12–11		
November 25	at Vanderbilt	Dudley Field; Nashville, TN (rivalry)	W 16–5		
*Non-conference game

== Game summaries ==
=== Southwestern Presbyterian ===
Team	1	2	Total
SW Presb.	0	0	0
• Sewanee	29	35	64

- Location: McGee Field
  Sewanee, Tennessee

The season opened with a 64–0 win over Southwestern Presbyterian. "The players suffered from the heat and dust." The first score came after three minutes had past, when Ed Finlay ran 60 yards for a touchdown.

The starting lineup was Williams (left end), Faulkenberry (left tackle), Cheape (left guard), Juhan (center), Cox (right guard), Moise (right tackle), Finlay (right end), Browne (quarterback), Myers (left halfback), Lanier (right halfback), Hawkins (fullback).

=== At Princeton ===
Team	1	2	Total
Sewanee	0	0	0
• Princeton	8	12	20

- Location: University Field
  Princeton, New Jersey
- Referee: C. R. Rinehart (Lafayette)

Sewanee was defeated by eastern power Princeton 20–0. Princeton's F. B. Read scored first on a 10-yard touchdown through Sewanee's right side, five minutes into the first quarter. Later, Princeton got a safety when Lionel Moise fell on his own punt in the endzone. Later still, Read had a 65-yard touchdown run. The final touchdown was a short run by F. T. Dawson.

The starting lineup was Williams (left end), Faulkenberry (left tackle), Cheape (left guard), Juhan (center), Cox (right guard), Moise (right tackle), Gillem (right end), Brown (quarterback), Myers (left halfback), Lanier (right halfback), Hawkins (fullback).

=== Georgia Tech ===
Team	1	2	Total
• Sewanee	6	9	15
Georgia Tech	0	0	0

- Location: Grant Field
  Atlanta
- Referee: Butler (Georgia)

Quarterback Chigger Browne starred in the 15–0 defeat of John Heisman's Georgia Tech. A touchdown in each half, and a 30-yard field goal from Moise in the second, made the scores. Browne ran in the first touchdown on a run which captured the crowd, and the second was on a forward pass from Browne to Hawkins.

The starting lineup was Williams (left end), Faulkenberry (left tackle), Cheape (left guard), Juhan (center), Cox (right guard), Moise (right tackle), Finlay (right end), Browne (quarterback), Myers (left halfback), Lanier (right halfback), Hawkins (fullback).

=== At LSU ===
Team	1	2	Total
• Sewanee	9	6	15
LSU	0	6	6

- Location: Pelican Park
  New Orleans, Louisiana
- Game attendance: 7,000
- Referee: James Halligan

Sewanee beat the LSU Tigers in New Orleans 15–6. According to Vanderbilt coach Dan McGugin, Sewanee won due to better punting.

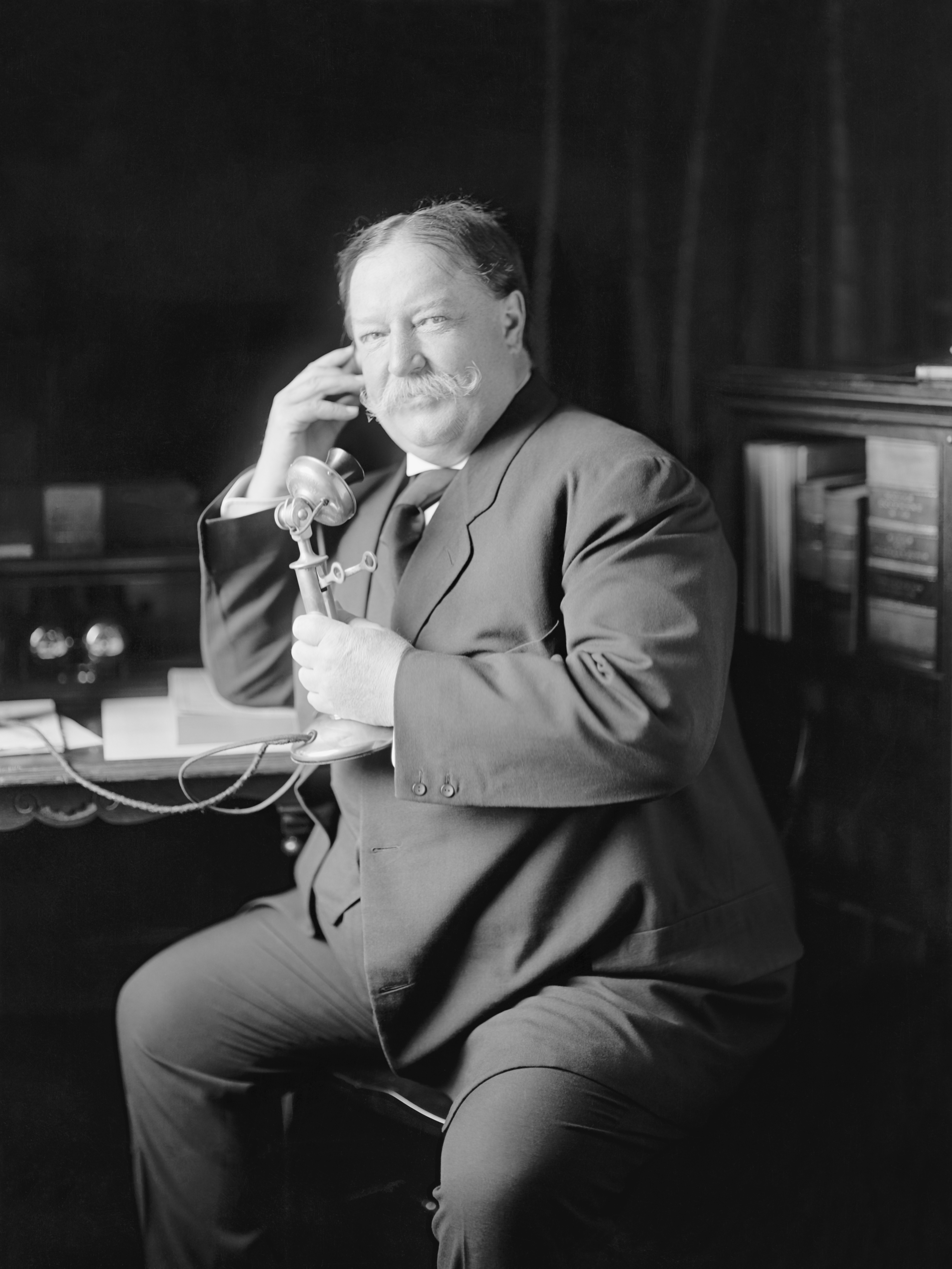
President Taft (pictured) showed up for the Sewanee-LSU game.

Sewanee scored with an Aubrey Lanier touchdown and Moise drop kick in the first half. LSU scored when, after blocking a punt, Robert L. Stovall recovered the ball for a touchdown. Soon after, President William Howard Taft showed up to the game for about ten minutes. Sewanee added another touchdown.

The starting lineup was Williams (left end), Faulkenberry (left tackle), Cheape (left guard), Juhan (center), Cox (right guard), Moise (right tackle), Gillem (right end), Brown (quarterback), Myers (left halfback), Lanier (right halfback), Hawkins (fullback).

=== Castle Heights ===
Sewanee beat the Castle Heights Military Academy 38–0. By the second half, Sewanee gained at will. The feature of the game was Gillem's 100-yard touchdown run.

The starting lineup was Williams (left end), Faulkenberry (left tackle), Cheape (left guard), Juhan (center), Stoney (right guard), Stone (right tackle), Finlay (right end), Brown (quarterback), Gillem (left halfback), Lanier (right halfback), Hawkins (fullback).

=== At Auburn ===
Team	1	2	Total
• Sewanee	6	6	12
Auburn	5	6	11

- Location: Birmingham, Alabama
- Referee: James Halligan

Sewanee defeated the Auburn Tigers by a single point, 12–11, Auburn's missed extra point proving the difference. Grantland Rice called this game the season's best contest, and recalled Lanier diving to fair catch a punt, and landing on his head.

Auburn scored when Lew Hardage put the ball in striking distance with a 30-yard run. Bradley Streit then went over for the touchdowns, Reynolds missed the kick. Sewanee's touchdown was set up by a 45-yard rush from Chigger Browne. Hawkins went over. Later, Browne had another big run of 60 yards and a touchdown. Moise made both extra points. Auburn blocked a punt for another score late.

The starting lineup was Williams (left end), Faulkenberry (left tackle), Cheape (left guard), Juhan (center), Cox (right guard), Moise (right tackle), Finlay (right end), Browne (quarterback), Lanier (left halfback), Gillem (right halfback), Hawkins (fullback).

=== At Vanderbilt ===
Team	1	2	Total
• Sewanee	5	11	16
Vanderbilt	0	5	5

- Location: Curry Field
  Nashville, Tennessee
- Referee: Bradley Walker

Sewanee easily defeated its old rival Vanderbilt 16–5, giving Vanderbilt its first loss to a Southern team in six years. and netting the SIAA championship for Sewanee. "Moise, for Sewanee, played the game of his life." For Sewanee's first score, a forward pass netted forty yards and Aubrey Lanier went around end for a touchdown. Lanier also got the second touchdown. The third came when Ed Finlay ran through the line.

The starting lineup was Williams (left end), Faulkenberry (left tackle), Cheape (left guard), Juhan (center), Cox (right guard), Moise (right tackle), Finlay (right end), Browne (quarterback), Myers (left halfback), Lanier (right halfback), Hawkins (fullback).

== Postseason ==
The Tigers won the SIAA title for the first time since the 1899 "iron men". Grantland Rice called Aubrey Lanier "the noblest Tiger of them all." The Kappa Alpha Journal gives similar praise that year, calling Lanier "The greatest performer of the college game on the Southern field.

== Players ==
=== Line ===
Player	Position	Games started	Hometown	Prep school	Height	Weight	Age
Eric Cheape	guard		Avon Park, Florida		6'1"	170	
Thomas A. Cox, Jr.	guard						
Ed Finlay	end						
Frank Faulkinberry	tackle		Lincoln County, Tennessee		6'4"	198	
Alvin C. Gillem	end						
Frank Juhan	center		Macon, Georgia		5'11"	160	
Lionel Moise	tackle		Dallas, Texas				
Jim Stoney	guard		Camden, South Carolina				
Silas Williams	end		Greenville, South Carolina		5'9"	150	

=== Backfield ===
Player	Position	Games started	Hometown	Prep school	Height	Weight	Age
Chigger Browne	quarterback		Memphis, Tennessee		5'8"	125	
Murray Hawkins	fullback						
Aubrey Lanier	halfback		Butler, Arkansas		5'10"	170	
John D. Myers	halfback						

== Coaching staff ==
- Harris G. Cope (Sewanee '01), head coach
- Henry D. Phillips (Sewanee '05), assistant and line coach
- Edward Dillon (Princeton '08), backfield coach
