= 1909 Mercer Baptists football team =

American college football season

1909 Mercer Baptists football
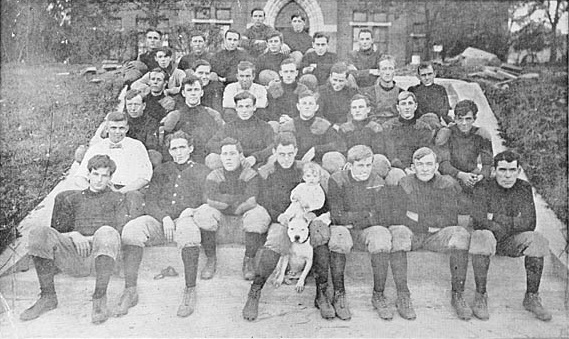
- Conference: Southern Intercollegiate Athletic Association
- Record: 3–5 (0–4 SIAA)
- Head coach: Frank Blake (2nd season)
- Home stadium: Central City Park

1909 Southern Intercollegiate Athletic Association football standings
	Conf.					Overall
Team	W		L		T	W		L		T
Sewanee $	4	–	0	–	0	6	–	1	–	0
Vanderbilt	4	–	1	–	0	7	–	3	–	0
Alabama	4	–	1	–	1	5	–	1	–	2
LSU	3	–	1	–	0	6	–	2	–	0
Georgia Tech	4	–	2	–	0	7	–	2	–	0
Auburn	4	–	2	–	0	5	–	2	–	0
Howard (AL)	2	–	2	–	0	5	–	2	–	1
Clemson	2	–	2	–	0	6	–	3	–	0
Ole Miss	1	–	2	–	1	4	–	3	–	2
Mississippi A&M	1	–	3	–	0	5	–	4	–	0
Georgia	1	–	4	–	1	1	–	4	–	2
The Citadel	0	–	1	–	1	3	–	3	–	2
Cumberland (TN)	0	–	1	–	0	0	–	1	–	0
Mercer	0	–	4	–	0	3	–	5	–	0
Tennessee	0	–	5	–	0	1	–	6	–	2
$ – Conference champion

The 1909 Mercer Baptists football team was an American football team that represented Mercer University as a member of the Southern Intercollegiate Athletic Association (SIAA) during the 1909 college football season. In their second year under head coach Frank Blake, the team compiled an 3–5 record, with a mark of 0–4 in the SIAA.

== Schedule ==
Date	Opponent	Site	Result	Source
September 25	Gordon*	Central City Park; Macon, GA	L 0–10	
October 2	at Vanderbilt	Dudley Field; Nashville, TN	L 5–28	
October 16	Auburn	Central City Park; Macon, GA	L 5–23	
October 23	Howard (AL)	Central City Park; Macon, GA	L 5–6	
November 6	Chattanooga*	Central City Park; Macon, GA	W 10–2	
November 13	Georgia Tech	Central City Park; Macon, GA	L 0–35	
November 20	South Carolina*	Central City Park; Macon, GA	W 5–3	
November 25	Norman Park*	Central City Park; Macon, GA	W 26–0	
*Non-conference game
