= 1909 The Citadel Bulldogs football team =

American college football season

1909 The Citadel Bulldogs football
- Conference: Southern Intercollegiate Athletic Association
- Record: 3–3–2 (0–1–1 SIAA)
- Head coach: Sam Costen (1st season)
- Captain: Ed Smith
- Home stadium: College Park Stadium

1909 Southern Intercollegiate Athletic Association football standings
| | Conf. | | | | | Overall |
| Team | W | | L | | T | W | | L | | T |
|---|---|---|---|---|---|---|---|---|---|---|
| Sewanee $ | 4 | – | 0 | – | 0 | 6 | – | 1 | – | 0 |
| Vanderbilt | 4 | – | 1 | – | 0 | 7 | – | 3 | – | 0 |
| Alabama | 4 | – | 1 | – | 1 | 5 | – | 1 | – | 2 |
| LSU | 3 | – | 1 | – | 0 | 6 | – | 2 | – | 0 |
| Georgia Tech | 4 | – | 2 | – | 0 | 7 | – | 2 | – | 0 |
| Auburn | 4 | – | 2 | – | 0 | 5 | – | 2 | – | 0 |
| Howard (AL) | 2 | – | 2 | – | 0 | 5 | – | 2 | – | 1 |
| Clemson | 2 | – | 2 | – | 0 | 6 | – | 3 | – | 0 |
| Ole Miss | 1 | – | 2 | – | 1 | 4 | – | 3 | – | 2 |
| Mississippi A&M | 1 | – | 3 | – | 0 | 5 | – | 4 | – | 0 |
| Georgia | 1 | – | 4 | – | 1 | 1 | – | 4 | – | 2 |
| The Citadel | 0 | – | 1 | – | 1 | 3 | – | 3 | – | 2 |
| Cumberland (TN) | 0 | – | 1 | – | 0 | 0 | – | 1 | – | 0 |
| Mercer | 0 | – | 4 | – | 0 | 3 | – | 5 | – | 0 |
| Tennessee | 0 | – | 5 | – | 0 | 1 | – | 6 | – | 2 |
$ – Conference champion

The 1909 The Citadel Bulldogs football team represented The Citadel as a member of the Southern Intercollegiate Athletic Association (SIAA) during the 1909 college football season. This was the fifth year of intercollegiate football at The Citadel, with Sam Costen serving as coach for the first season. The 1909 team was the first to be officially called the Bulldogs. The program played its first road game on November 3 against Davidson at the State Fairgrounds in Columbia, South Carolina. All other games are believed to have been played at Hampton Park at the site of the old race course.

== Schedule ==
| Date | Opponent | Site | Result | Attendance | Source |
|---|---|---|---|---|---|
| October 2 | College of Charleston* | Charleston, SC | W 36–0 | | |
| October 9 | Georgia | College Park Stadium; Charleston, SC | T 0–0 | | |
| October 16 | Port Royal Marines* | College Park Stadium; Charleston, SC | L 5–17 | | |
| October 30 | Porter Military Academy* | Charleston, SC | W 80–0 | | |
| November 3 | vs. Davidson* | State Fairgrounds; Columbia, SC | T 0–0 | | |
| November 13 | Clemson | College Park Stadium; Charleston, SC | L 0–17 | | |
| November 20 | College of Charleston* | Charleston, SC | W 21–6 | | |
| November 25 | South Carolina* | College Park Stadium; Charleston, SC | L 5–11 | 1,600 | |
*Non-conference game
