= 1909 Clemson Tigers football team =

American college football season

1909 Clemson Tigers football
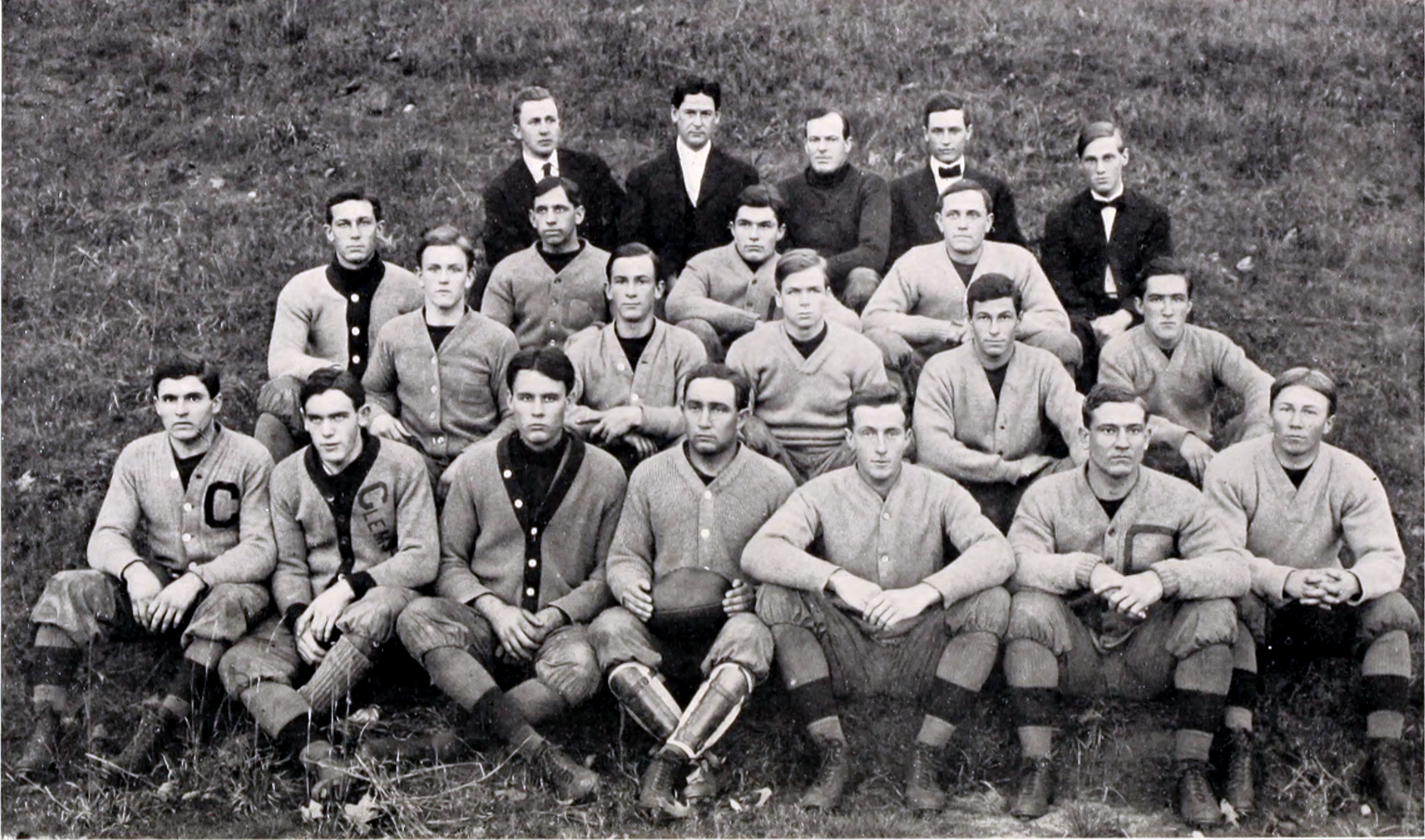
- Conference: Southern Intercollegiate Athletic Association
- Record: 6–3 (2–2 SIAA)
- Head coach: Bob Williams (2nd season)
- Captain: C. M. Robbs
- Home stadium: Bowman Field

1909 Southern Intercollegiate Athletic Association football standings
	Conf.					Overall
Team	W		L		T	W		L		T
Sewanee $	4	–	0	–	0	6	–	1	–	0
Vanderbilt	4	–	1	–	0	7	–	3	–	0
Alabama	4	–	1	–	1	5	–	1	–	2
LSU	3	–	1	–	0	6	–	2	–	0
Georgia Tech	4	–	2	–	0	7	–	2	–	0
Auburn	4	–	2	–	0	5	–	2	–	0
Howard (AL)	2	–	2	–	0	5	–	2	–	1
Clemson	2	–	2	–	0	6	–	3	–	0
Ole Miss	1	–	2	–	1	4	–	3	–	2
Mississippi A&M	1	–	3	–	0	5	–	4	–	0
Georgia	1	–	4	–	1	1	–	4	–	2
The Citadel	0	–	1	–	1	3	–	3	–	2
Cumberland (TN)	0	–	1	–	0	0	–	1	–	0
Mercer	0	–	4	–	0	3	–	5	–	0
Tennessee	0	–	5	–	0	1	–	6	–	2
$ – Conference champion

The 1909 Clemson Tigers football team represented Clemson Agricultural College—now known as Clemson University—as a member of the Southern Intercollegiate Athletic Association (SIAA) during the 1909 college football season. Under Bob Williams, who returned for his second season as head coach after having helped the team in 1906, the Tigers compiled an overall record of 6–3 with a mark of 2–2 in SIAA play. C. M. Robbs was the team captain. The team was a member of the Southern Intercollegiate Athletic Association.

== Schedule ==
Date	Opponent	Site	Result	Source
September 27	Gordon*	Bowman Field; Calhoun, SC	W 26–0	
October 2	at VPI*	Miles Field; Blacksburg, VA	L 0–6	
October 9	vs. Davidson*	Latta Park; Charlotte, NC	W 17–5	
October 16	at Alabama	Birmingham Fairgrounds; Birmingham, AL (rivalry)	L 0–3	
October 23	Port Royal*	Bowman Field; Calhoun, SC	W 19–0	
November 4	at South Carolina*	Fair Grounds; Columbia, SC (rivalry)	W 6–0	
November 10	vs. Georgia	Augusta, GA (rivalry)	W 5–0	
November 13	at The Citadel	College Park Stadium; Charleston, SC	W 17–0	
November 25	at Georgia Tech	Ponce de Leon Park; Atlanta, GA (rivalry)	L 3–29	
*Non-conference game

== Bibliography ==
- Bourret, Tim. "2010 Clemson Football Media Guide" (PDF). Clemson University. p. 202. Archived (PDF) from the original on November 12, 2012.
