= Lionel Moise =

American lawyer

Biographical details
- Born: December 31, 1888; Dallas, Texas, U.S.
- Died: March 8, 1949 (aged 59); St. Louis, Missouri, U.S.

Playing career
- 1909: Sewanee
- Position: Tackle

Coaching career (HC unless noted)
- 1910: Terrill School for Boys (assistant)
- 1911: Terrill School for Boys
- 1912: Dallas University Academy
- 1914: Texas A&M (assistant)
- 1916: SMU (assistant)
- 1917–1918: Southwestern

Accomplishments and honors

Awards
- All-Southern (1909)

Lionel Moise (December 31, 1888 – March 8, 1949) was an American college football player, coach, and official as well as an attorney.

== Early years ==
His early education was secured in the public schools of Dallas, following which he attended St. Matthew's Academy, an Episcopal preparatory school. He later supplemented this training by attending Baylor University School in Chattanooga, from which he received a scholarship to the Sewanee: The University of the South.

== Sewanee ==
Moise was a prominent tackle for the Sewanee Tigers football team; "one of the great names of Sewanee football history." At Sewanee he was a member of the Kappa Alpha Order fraternity.

=== 1909 ===
In 1909 the team won a conference championship. Moise was also the kicker on the squad. He was selected All-Southern.

== Coaching career ==
He assisted Charley Moran with defense at Texas A&M in 1914. After serving as an assistant coach at a high school in Dallas (Terrill School), Moise assisted Ray Morrison at Southern Methodist in 1916. He was hired as head coach of Southwestern University in 1917.
