= J. W. H. Pollard =

American football player and sports coach (1872–1957)

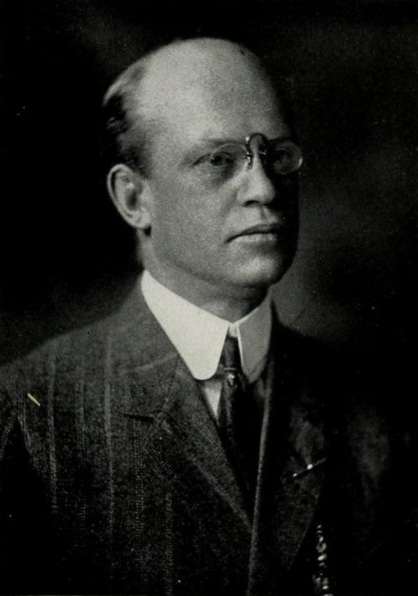
- Pollard pictured in The Calyx 1913, Washington and Lee yearbook

Biographical details
- Born: February 22, 1872; Brentwood, New Hampshire, U.S.
- Died: May 2, 1957 (aged 85); Haverhill, Massachusetts, U.S.

Playing career

Football
- 1891–1892: Dartmouth

Coaching career (HC unless noted)

Football
- 1897–1899: Union (NY)
- 1901: Lehigh
- 1902–1904: Rochester (NY)
- 1906–1909: Alabama
- 1910–1911: Washington and Lee

Basketball
- 1901–1912: Lehigh
- 1902–1905: Rochester (NY)
- 1910–1913: Washington and Lee

Baseball
- 1907–1910: Alabama
- 1912–1913: Washington and Lee

Administrative career (AD unless noted)
- 1907–1910: Alabama

Head coaching record
- Overall: 56–43–8 (football); 95–55 (basketball); 86–31–1 (baseball)

John William Hobbs "Doc" Pollard (February 22, 1872 – May 2, 1957) was an American football player and coach of football, basketball, and baseball. He served as the head football coach at Union College in Schenectady, New York, from 1897 to 1899, at Lehigh University in 1901, at the University of Rochester from 1902 to 1904, at the University of Alabama from 1906 to 1909, and at Washington and Lee University from 1910 to 1911, compiling a career college football record of 56–43–8. Pollard also coached baseball at Alabama from 1907–1910 and at Washington and Lee, tallying a career college baseball mark of 86–31–1.

== Early life and education ==
Pollard was born on February 22, 1872, in Brentwood, New Hampshire. He graduated from Dartmouth College in 1895 and earned an MD from the University of Vermont in 1901.

== Coaching career ==
=== Union ===
Pollard served as the head coach at Union College in Schenectady, New York, from 1897 to 1899.

=== Lehigh ===
Pollard was the ninth head football coach for at Lehigh University in Bethlehem, Pennsylvania, and he held that position for the 1901 season. His coaching record at Lehigh was 1–11.

=== Alabama ===
Pollard was named the head football coach at the University of Alabama where he stayed from 1906 until the end of the 1909 season. He found more success at Alabama, where his teams accumulated a record of 21–4–5. Against Auburn in his first season, Pollard used a "military shift" never before seen in the south.

His success at Alabama was not without failures. The first season Pollard coached the Crimson Tide, they achieved a record of 5–1. However, that one loss was a 78–0 thrashing by Vanderbilt in Nashville, Tennessee. 1907, Pollard's second season at Alabama, was similar. The team produced a record of 5–1–2. However, the one loss was a 54–4 pounding by Sewanee. By 1909, his team produced more consistent results. No team scored on the Crimson Tide until the last two games, and their only loss came in the last game of the season by a score of 12–6 against LSU at home.

=== Washington and Lee ===
Pollard coached at Washington and Lee University in 1911, finishing with a record of 4–2–2.

== Death ==
Pollard died on May 2, 1957.

== Head coaching record ==
=== Football ===
Year	Team	Overall	Conference	Standing	Bowl/playoffs
Union Garnet (Independent) (1897–1899)
1897	Union	4–4–1			
1898	Union	8–1			
1899	Union	1–5–1			
Union:		13–10–1			
Lehigh Brown and White (Independent) (1901)
1901	Lehigh	1–11			
Lehigh:		1–11			
Rochester Yellowjackets (Independent) (1902–1905)
1902	Rochester	3–6			
1903	Rochester	4–4			
1904	Rochester	6–3			
Rochester:		13–13			
Alabama Crimson Tide (Southern Intercollegiate Athletic Association) (1906–1909)
1906	Alabama	5–1	4–1		
1907	Alabama	5–1–2	3–1–2		
1908	Alabama	6–1–1	2–1–1		
1909	Alabama	5–1–2	4–1–2		
Alabama:		21–4–5	13–4–5		
Washington and Lee Generals (Independent) (1910–1911)
1910	Washington and Lee	4–3			
1911	Washington and Lee	4–2–2			
Washington and Lee:		8–5–2			
Total:		56–43–8			
