= B. R. Cecil =

American football player and coach

Playing career
- 1908–1910: Virginia
- Position: Tackle

Coaching career (HC unless noted)
- 1911: Hampden–Sydney

Head coaching record
- Overall: 3–5

Accomplishments and honors

Awards
- All-Southern (1909)

B. R. Cecil was an American football player and coach. He served as the head football coach at Hampden–Sydney College in Hampden Sydney, Virginia in 1911, compiling a record of 3–5. He played college football at the University of Virginia, serving as team captain in 1909.

== Head coaching record ==
Year	Team	Overall	Conference	Standing	Bowl/playoffs
Hampden–Sydney Tigers (Eastern Virginia Intercollegiate Athletic Association) (1911)
1911	Hampden–Sydney	3–5	2–1	2nd	
Hampden–Sydney:		3–5	2–1		
Total:		3–5			
