= Osborn Engineering =

American architectural firm

Osborn Engineering is an architectural and engineering firm based in Cleveland, Ohio. Founded in 1892, it is noted mostly for designing sports stadiums. More than 100 stadiums have been designed by Osborn, including such famous parks as Fenway Park in Boston, the original Yankee Stadium in New York City, Tiger Stadium in Detroit, and numerous minor league, collegiate, and major league sports facilities in all sports. They also design other structures, including infrastructure and public sector buildings, industrial and manufacturing, and parking structures.

== Structures designed by Osborn Engineering ==
- League Park, 1910
- Griffith Stadium, 1911
- Polo Grounds reconstruction, 1911
- Tiger Stadium, 1912
- Braves Field, 1915
- Comiskey Park renovations, ca 1920
- Sportsman's Park renovations, 1922
- Kansas City Municipal Stadium, 1923
- Yankee Stadium, 1923
- Ross–Ade Stadium, 1924
- Dill Field, 1925
- Notre Dame Stadium, 1929
- Ben Hill Griffin Stadium, 1930
- Cleveland Municipal Stadium, 1931
- Fenway Park renovations, 1934
- Milwaukee County Stadium, 1951
- Metropolitan Stadium, 1955
- RFK Stadium, 1959
- WVU Coliseum, 1968
- Three Rivers Stadium, 1970
- Jacobs Field, 1994
- Ohio Stadium 1999-2000 renovations
- Forbes Field
