= 1909 Tennessee Volunteers football team =

American college football season

1909 Tennessee Volunteers football
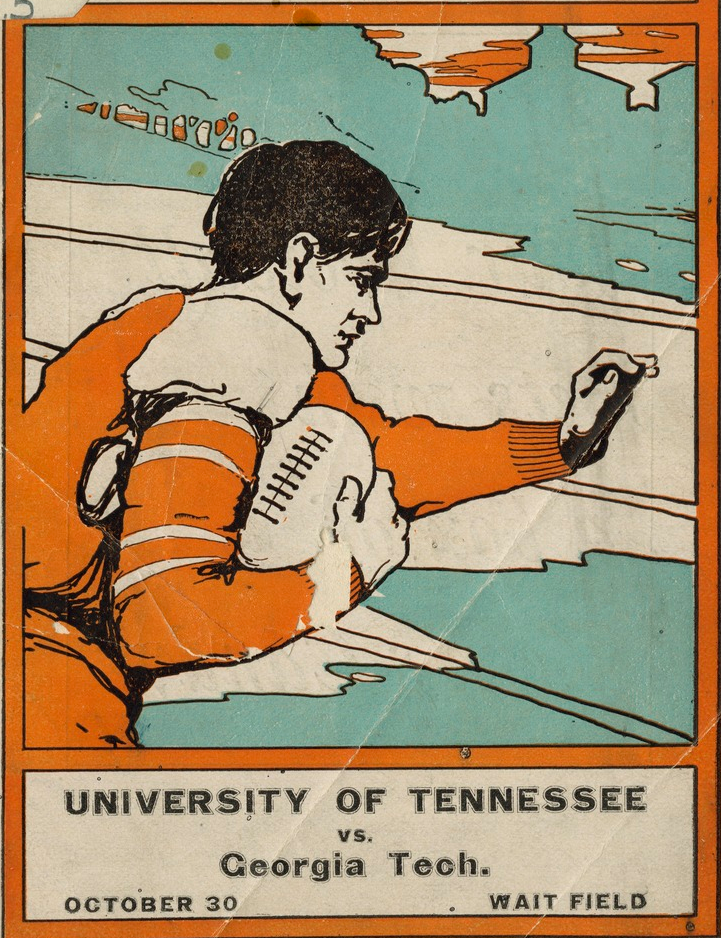
- Conference: Southern Intercollegiate Athletic Association
- Record: 1–6–2 (0–5 SIAA)
- Head coach: George Levene (3rd season)
- Captain: Nathan Dougherty
- Home stadium: Waite Field

1909 Southern Intercollegiate Athletic Association football standings
	Conf.					Overall
Team	W		L		T	W		L		T
Sewanee $	4	–	0	–	0	6	–	1	–	0
Vanderbilt	4	–	1	–	0	7	–	3	–	0
Alabama	4	–	1	–	1	5	–	1	–	2
LSU	3	–	1	–	0	6	–	2	–	0
Georgia Tech	4	–	2	–	0	7	–	2	–	0
Auburn	4	–	2	–	0	5	–	2	–	0
Howard (AL)	2	–	2	–	0	5	–	2	–	1
Clemson	2	–	2	–	0	6	–	3	–	0
Ole Miss	1	–	2	–	1	4	–	3	–	2
Mississippi A&M	1	–	3	–	0	5	–	4	–	0
Georgia	1	–	4	–	1	1	–	4	–	2
The Citadel	0	–	1	–	1	3	–	3	–	2
Cumberland (TN)	0	–	1	–	0	0	–	1	–	0
Mercer	0	–	4	–	0	3	–	5	–	0
Tennessee	0	–	5	–	0	1	–	6	–	2
$ – Conference champion

The 1909 Tennessee Volunteers football team represented the University of Tennessee in the 1909 college football season. The Volunteers went 1–6–2, their worst season since 1906, when they compiled the same record. George Levene served the final year of his three-year tenure as head coach.

== Schedule ==
Date	Opponent	Site	Result	Attendance	Source
October 2	Central University*	Waite Field; Knoxville, TN	T 0–0		
October 9	North Carolina*	Waite Field; Knoxville, TN	L 0–3		
October 16	at Kentucky State College	Stoll Field; Lexington, KY (rivalry)	L 0–17	2,000	
October 23	Georgia	Waite Field; Knoxville, TN (rivalry)	L 0–3		
October 30	Georgia Tech	Waite Field; Knoxville, TN (rivalry)	L 0–29		
November 6	at Vanderbilt	Dudley Field; Nashville, TN (rivalry)	L 0–51		
November 13	Alabama	Waite Field; Knoxville, TN (rivalry)	L 0–10		
November 20	at Chattanooga*	Chamberlain Field; Chattanooga, TN	T 0–0		
November 25	Transylvania*	Waite Field; Knoxville, TN	W 11–0		
*Non-conference game
