= 1909 Howard Crimson and Blue football team =

American college football season

1909 Howard Crimson and Blue football
- Conference: Southern Intercollegiate Athletic Association
- Record: 5–2–1 (2–2 SIAA)
- Head coach: John B. Longwell (1st season)
- Home stadium: West End Park

1909 Southern Intercollegiate Athletic Association football standings
	Conf.					Overall
Team	W		L		T	W		L		T
Sewanee $	4	–	0	–	0	6	–	1	–	0
Vanderbilt	4	–	1	–	0	7	–	3	–	0
Alabama	4	–	1	–	1	5	–	1	–	2
LSU	3	–	1	–	0	6	–	2	–	0
Georgia Tech	4	–	2	–	0	7	–	2	–	0
Auburn	4	–	2	–	0	5	–	2	–	0
Howard (AL)	2	–	2	–	0	5	–	2	–	1
Clemson	2	–	2	–	0	6	–	3	–	0
Ole Miss	1	–	2	–	1	4	–	3	–	2
Mississippi A&M	1	–	3	–	0	5	–	4	–	0
Georgia	1	–	4	–	1	1	–	4	–	2
The Citadel	0	–	1	–	1	3	–	3	–	2
Cumberland (TN)	0	–	1	–	0	0	–	1	–	0
Mercer	0	–	4	–	0	3	–	5	–	0
Tennessee	0	–	5	–	0	1	–	6	–	2
$ – Conference champion

The 1909 Howard Crimson and Blue football team was an American football team that represented Howard College (now known as the Samford University) as a member of the Southern Intercollegiate Athletic Association (SIAA) during the 1909 college football season. In their first year under head coach John B. Longwell, the team compiled an 5–2–1 record.

== Schedule ==
Date	Opponent	Site	Result	Source
October 2	vs. Auburn	Baseball Field; Montgomery, AL	L 11–0	
October 9	at Alabama	The Quad; Tuscaloosa, AL	L 14–0	
October 15	Jacksonville State*	West End Park; Birmingham, AL	W 33–0	
October 23	at Mercer	Central City Park; Macon, GA	W 6–5	
October 31	at Chattanooga*	Chamberlain Field; Chattanooga, TN	T 0–0	
November 8	Mississippi A&M	West End Park; Birmingham, AL	W 6–0	
November 20	Birmingham*	West End Park; Birmingham, AL	W 26–0	
November 25	Georgetown (KY)*	West End Park; Birmingham, AL	W 11–0	
*Non-conference game
