= 1909 Mississippi A&M Aggies football team =

American college football season

1909 Mississippi A&M Aggies football
- Conference: Southern Intercollegiate Athletic Association
- Record: 5–4 (1–3 SIAA)
- Head coach: W. D. Chadwick (1st season)
- Home stadium: Hardy Field

1909 Southern Intercollegiate Athletic Association football standings
	Conf.					Overall
Team	W		L		T	W		L		T
Sewanee $	4	–	0	–	0	6	–	1	–	0
Vanderbilt	4	–	1	–	0	7	–	3	–	0
Alabama	4	–	1	–	1	5	–	1	–	2
LSU	3	–	1	–	0	6	–	2	–	0
Georgia Tech	4	–	2	–	0	7	–	2	–	0
Auburn	4	–	2	–	0	5	–	2	–	0
Howard (AL)	2	–	2	–	0	5	–	2	–	1
Clemson	2	–	2	–	0	6	–	3	–	0
Ole Miss	1	–	2	–	1	4	–	3	–	2
Mississippi A&M	1	–	3	–	0	5	–	4	–	0
Georgia	1	–	4	–	1	1	–	4	–	2
The Citadel	0	–	1	–	1	3	–	3	–	2
Cumberland (TN)	0	–	1	–	0	0	–	1	–	0
Mercer	0	–	4	–	0	3	–	5	–	0
Tennessee	0	–	5	–	0	1	–	6	–	2
$ – Conference champion

The 1909 Mississippi A&M Aggies football team represented The Agricultural and Mechanical College of the State of Mississippi (now known as Mississippi State University) as a member of the Southern Intercollegiate Athletic Association (SIAA) during the 1909 college football season. Led by first-year head coach W. D. Chadwick, the Aggies compiled an overall record of 5–4, with a mark of 0–3 in conference play.

== Schedule ==
Date	Opponent	Site	Result	Source
October 2	Birmingham*	Hardy Field; Starkville, MS	W 21–0	
October 9	Cumberland (TN)	Hardy Field; Starkville, MS	W 34–6	
October 16	at LSU	State Field; Baton Rouge, LA	L 0–15	
October 22	Southwestern Presbyterian*	Columbus Fairgrounds; Columbus, MS	W 31–0	
October 30	at Tulane*	Tulane Stadium; New Orleans, LA	L 0–2	
November 2	Union (TN)*	Columbus Fairgrounds; Columbus, MS	W 22–0	
November 8	at Howard (AL)	West End Park; Birmingham, AL	L 0–6	
November 13	Chattanooga*	Hardy Field; Starkville, MS	W 37–6	
November 25	vs. Ole Miss	Mississippi State Fairgrounds; Jackson, MS (rivalry)	L 5–9	
*Non-conference game
