= 1909 Ohio State Buckeyes football team =

American college football season

1909 Ohio State Buckeyes football
- Conference: Ohio Athletic Conference
- Record: 7–3 (5–2 OAC)
- Head coach: Albert E. Herrnstein (4th season)
- Home stadium: Ohio Field

1909 Ohio Athletic Conference football standings
	Conf.					Overall
Team	W		L		T	W		L		T
Oberlin $	4	–	0	–	1	5	–	1	–	1
Case	5	–	0	–	2	6	–	1	–	2
Ohio State	5	–	2	–	0	7	–	3	–	0
Western Reserve	2	–	1	–	1	5	–	3	–	1
Kenyon	4	–	4	–	0	6	–	4	–	0
Denison	3	–	3	–	0	4	–	5	–	1
Ohio Wesleyan	2	–	4	–	0	5	–	4	–	0
Wittenberg	1	–	3	–	0	3	–	6	–	0
Wooster	1	–	5	–	0	1	–	6	–	0
Heidelberg	0	–	5	–	0	0	–	8	–	1
$ – Conference champion

The 1909 Ohio State Buckeyes football team was an American football team that represented Ohio State University during the 1909 college football season. In their fourth season under head coach Albert E. Herrnstein, the Buckeyes compiled a 7–3 record and outscored their opponents by a combined total of 219 to 76.

== Schedule ==
Date	Opponent	Site	Result	Source
September 25	Otterbein*	Ohio Field; Columbus, OH	W 14–0	
October 2	Wittenberg	Ohio Field; Columbus, OH	W 39–0	
October 9	Wooster	Ohio Field; Columbus, OH	W 74–0	
October 16	at Michigan*	Ferry Field; Ann Arbor, MI (rivalry)	L 6–33	
October 23	Ohio Wesleyan	Ohio Field; Columbus, OH	W 21–6	
October 30	Denison	Ohio Field; Columbus, OH	W 29–0	
November 6	Case	Ohio Field; Columbus, OH	L 3–11	
November 13	Vanderbilt*	Ohio Field; Columbus, OH	W 5–0	
November 20	at Oberlin	Oberlin, OH	L 6–26	
November 25	Kenyon	Ohio Field; Columbus, OH	W 22–0	
*Non-conference game
