= 1909 Auburn Tigers football team =

American college football season

1909 Auburn Tigers football
- Conference: Southern Intercollegiate Athletic Association
- Record: 5–2 (4–2 SIAA)
- Head coach: Mike Donahue (5th season)
- Base defense: 7–2–2
- Captain: Walker Reynolds
- Home stadium: Drill Field; West End Park

1909 Southern Intercollegiate Athletic Association football standings
	Conf.					Overall
Team	W		L		T	W		L		T
Sewanee $	4	–	0	–	0	6	–	1	–	0
Vanderbilt	4	–	1	–	0	7	–	3	–	0
Alabama	4	–	1	–	1	5	–	1	–	2
LSU	3	–	1	–	0	6	–	2	–	0
Georgia Tech	4	–	2	–	0	7	–	2	–	0
Auburn	4	–	2	–	0	5	–	2	–	0
Howard (AL)	2	–	2	–	0	5	–	2	–	1
Clemson	2	–	2	–	0	6	–	3	–	0
Ole Miss	1	–	2	–	1	4	–	3	–	2
Mississippi A&M	1	–	3	–	0	5	–	4	–	0
Georgia	1	–	4	–	1	1	–	4	–	2
The Citadel	0	–	1	–	1	3	–	3	–	2
Cumberland (TN)	0	–	1	–	0	0	–	1	–	0
Mercer	0	–	4	–	0	3	–	5	–	0
Tennessee	0	–	5	–	0	1	–	6	–	2
$ – Conference champion

The 1909 Auburn Tigers football team was an American football team that represented Alabama Polytechnic Institute (now known As Auburn University) as a member of the Southern Intercollegiate Athletic Association (SIAA) during the 1909 college football season. In their fifth year under head coach Mike Donahue, the team compiled an overall record of 5–2, with a mark of 4–2 in conference play, placing sixth in the SIAA.

== Schedule ==
Date	Opponent	Site	Result	Source
October 2	vs. Howard (AL)	Baseball Field; Montgomery, AL	W 11–0	
October 9	Gordon*	Drill Field; Auburn, AL	W 46–0	
October 16	at Mercer	Macon, GA	W 23–5	
October 23	at Vanderbilt	Dudley Field; Nashville, TN	L 0–17	
November 6	at Georgia Tech	Ponce de Leon Park; Atlanta, GA (rivalry)	W 8–0	
November 13	Sewanee	West End Park; Birmingham, AL	L 11–12	
November 25	Georgia	Montgomery, AL (rivalry)	W 16–5	
*Non-conference game
