= Harry Esslinger =

American football player and coach (1890–1970)

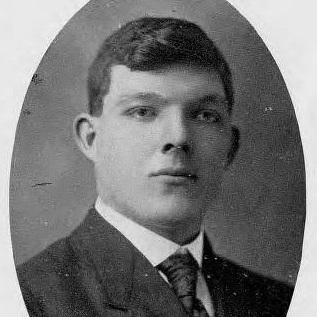
- Esslinger in the Glomerata c. 1909

Profile
- Position: Tackle

Personal information
- Born: October 16, 1890; Gurley, Alabama
- Died: November 28, 1970 (aged 80); Huntsville, Alabama

Career information
- College: Auburn (1907–1909)

Awards and highlights
- All-Southern (1909)

Harry Wright "Slinger" Esslinger (October 16, 1890 – November 28, 1970) was a college football player and high school football coach.

== Auburn University ==
He was a prominent tackle for the Auburn Tigers football team of Auburn University.

=== 1909 ===
Esslinger was selected All-Southern in 1909.

== Coaching career ==
He was a pioneer coach at Huntsville High School. He served in that capacity from 1920 to 1932.
