= Frank Dobson (American football) =

American sports coach and administrator (1885–1956)

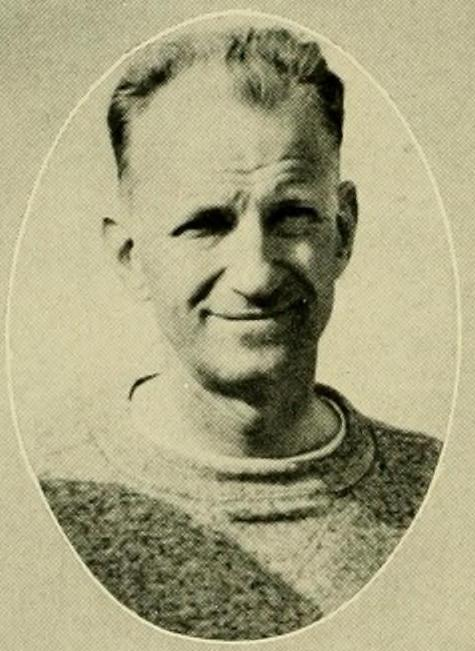
- Dobson at Maryland in 1936

Biographical details
- Born: January 10, 1885; Philadelphia, Pennsylvania, U.S.
- Died: December 1, 1956 (aged 71); Carlisle, Indiana, U.S.
- Education: Princeton University

Playing career

Baseball
- 1906: Jackson Senators
- 1907: Terre Haute Hottentots
- 1907: Portsmouth Truckers
- 1907–1908: Anderson Electricians
- 1909–1910: Fayetteville Highlanders
- 1910–1911: Richmond Colts
- 1913: Richmond Colts
- Positions: Outfielder, shortstop

Coaching career (HC unless noted)

Football
- 1906: Rose Polytechnic (assistant)
- 1908: Georgia Tech (assistant)
- 1909: University School for Boys (GA)
- 1909: Georgia (co-HC)
- 1910–1912: Clemson
- 1913–1917: Richmond
- 1918: South Carolina
- 1919–1933: Richmond
- 1935: Maryland (assistant)
- 1936–1939: Maryland
- 1940–1948: Apprentice

Basketball
- 1911–1913: Clemson
- 1912–1917: Richmond
- 1919–1933: Richmond

Baseball
- 1911–1913: Clemson
- 1915–1933: Richmond

Track and field
- 1914–1934: Richmond

Administrative career (AD unless noted)
- 1910–1912: Clemson
- 1913–1918: Richmond
- 1918: South Carolina
- 1919–1933: Richmond

Head coaching record
- Overall: 136–142–24 (college football); 166–113 (college basketball); 197–124–2 (college baseball)

Accomplishments and honors

Championships
- Football; 3 EVIAA (1913–1914, 1916); 2 Virginia (1932–1933); 1 SoCon (1937)

Frank Mills Dobson (January 10, 1885 – December 1, 1956) was an American college football, college basketball, college baseball, and track and field coach and athletics administrator. He served as the head football coach at the University of Georgia (1909, with Joseph Coulter), Clemson University (1910–1912), the University of Richmond (1913–1917, 1919–1933), the University of South Carolina (1918), the University of Maryland (1936–1939), and The Apprentice School (1940–1948), compiling a career college football head coaching record of 136–142–24. Dobson was also the head basketball coach at Clemson (1911–1913) and Richmond (1912–1917, 1919–1933) and the head baseball coach at Clemson (1911–1913) and Richmond (1915–1933).

== Early life and education ==
Born in Philadelphia, Dobson attended the Lawrenceville School in Lawrenceville, New Jersey and Peddie Institute–now known as Peddie School—a Hightstown, New Jersey. At Peddie, he played halfback on the football team, forward on the basketball team, and second base on the baseball team. He also ran the quarter-mile for the track team.

== Coaching career ==
=== Rose Polytechnic and Georgia Tech ===
Dobson began his coaching career as a part-time assistant football coach at Rose Polytechnic Institute—now known as Rose–Hulman Institute of Technology—in Terre Haute, Indiana. In 1908, he joined the coaching staff at Georgia Tech under John Heisman. Dobson had charge of Georgia Tech's freshman football team in the fall of 1908.

=== Georgia ===
In the spring of 1909, Dobson was appointed athletic instructor and coach at the University School for Boys in Stone Mountain, Georgia. He coached the school's football team that fall. In November 1909, Dobson was brought in by the University of Georgia to assist Joseph Colter in coaching the 1909 Georgia Bulldogs football team. Dobson added new trick plays in an attempt to energize the offense. Still the team finished with a record of 1–4–2. Georgia credits Colter and Dobson as co-coaches for the 1909 season.

=== Clemson ===
Dobson moved on to Clemson University in 1910, where he coached not only football, but also basketball and baseball. His overall record with the Clemson football team was 11–12–1.

=== Richmond and South Carolina ===
Dobson then moved to the University of Richmond, where he was athletic director and football, baseball, and basketball coach from 1913 to 1933, with one exception: in the abbreviated postwar season of 1918, rather than coaching the Richmond football team, he took over the South Carolina Gamecocks and led them to a record of 2–1–1. Dobson's overall football record at Richmond was 79–78–18, his baseball record was 153–112, and his basketball record was 153–106. Dobson was posthumously elected to the University of Richmond Athletic Hall of Fame in 1978.

=== Maryland ===
In 1935, Dobson became an assistant at Maryland under head coach Jack Faber. The following season, he was promoted to head coach and served in that position through 1939. Dobson amassed an 18–21 record at Maryland.

=== Apprentice ===
Dobson finished his career as the 11th head football coach at The Apprentice School in Newport News, Virginia and he held that position for nine seasons, from 1940 until 1948. His coaching record at Apprentice was 25–26–2. A highlight at Apprentice was a 7–6 upset of the Virginia in 1943.

== Death ==
Dobson died on December 1, 1956, in Carlisle, Indiana. He was found dead in his bed after suffering a coronary occlusion.

== Head coaching record ==
=== College football ===
Year	Team	Overall	Conference	Standing	Bowl/playoffs
Georgia Bulldogs (Southern Intercollegiate Athletic Association) (1909)
1909	Georgia	1–4–2	1–4–1		
Georgia:		1–4–2	1–4–1		
Clemson Tigers (Southern Intercollegiate Athletic Association) (1910–1912)
1910	Clemson	4–3–1	2–3–1	10th	
1911	Clemson	3–5	2–4	13th	
1912	Clemson	4–4	3–3	T–8th	
Clemson:		11–12–1	7–10–1		
Richmond Spiders (Eastern Virginia Intercollegiate Athletic Association / South Atlantic Intercollegiate Athletic Association) (1913–1917)
1913	Richmond	5–3–1	3–0 /	1st /	
1914	Richmond	5–4	5–1 / 0–2	1st / 9th	
1915	Richmond	4–4–1	3–2–1 / 0–1	T–2nd / T–6th	
1916	Richmond	5–4–2	4–1–2 / 1–3–1	T–1st / 9th	
1917	Richmond	4–2–1	4–1–1 / 2–1	2nd / T–2nd	
South Carolina Gamecocks (Southern Intercollegiate Athletic Association) (1918)
1918	South Carolina	2–1–1			
South Carolina:		2–1–1			
Richmond Spiders (South Atlantic Intercollegiate Athletic Association) (1919–1921)
1919	Richmond	5–2–2	2–2–1	T–7th	
1920	Richmond	6–2	2–2	T–7th	
1921	Richmond	4–3–1	2–2–1	T–7th	
Richmond Spiders (Independent) (1922–1926)
1922	Richmond	6–2–1			
1923	Richmond	3–5			
1924	Richmond	2–6–1			
1925	Richmond	3–6			
1926	Richmond	2–7			
Richmond Spiders (Virginia Conference) (1927–1933)
1927	Richmond	4–4–1	3–1–1	3rd	
1928	Richmond	3–4–2	2–3–1	5th	
1929	Richmond	3–5–1	2–3–1	5th	
1930	Richmond	2–4–2	2–2–2	5th	
1931	Richmond	4–5	3–2	3rd	
1932	Richmond	4–2–2	3–0–2	1st	
1933	Richmond	5–4	2–1	T–1st	
Richmond:		79–78–18			
Maryland Terrapins (Southern Conference) (1936–1939)
1936	Maryland	6–5	4–2	5th	
1937	Maryland	8–2	3–0	1st	
1938	Maryland	2–7	1–2	12th	
1939	Maryland	2–7	0–1	14th	
Maryland:		18–21	8–5		
Apprentice Builders (Independent) (1940–1948)
1940	Apprentice	2–5			
1941	Apprentice	7–1			
1942	Apprentice	3–3–2			
1943	Apprentice	5–2			
1944	No team—World War II				
1945	No team—World War II				
1946	Apprentice	2–5			
1947	Apprentice	1–6			
1948	Apprentice	5–4			
Apprentice:		25–26–2			
Total:		136–142–24			
National championship Conference title Conference division title or championship game berth

== See also ==
- List of college football career coaching losses leaders
