= Esslinger =

Esslinger (or Eßlinger) is a German surname. It may refer to:

== People ==
- Hartmut Esslinger (born 1944), German-American industrial designer and inventor
- Tilman Esslinger (born ?), German experimental physicist
- Willi Eßlinger (1916–1944), German Nazi Waffen-SS officer
- Harry Esslinger (1890–1970), college football player and high school football coach

== Other ==
- A synonym of Gouais blanc, a variety of white grape used in winemaking
