= Nathan Stauffer =

American football player, coach, and physician (1875–1959)

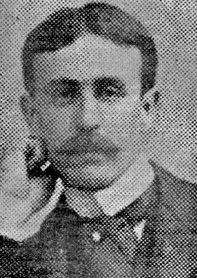

Biographical details
- Born: January 1, 1875; Chester County, Pennsylvania, U.S.
- Died: June 5, 1959 (aged 84); Philadelphia, Pennsylvania, U.S.

Playing career
- 1895: Penn
- Position: Fullback

Coaching career (HC unless noted)
- 1896–1899: Dickinson
- 1900–1901: Pennsylvania Military
- 1903–1908: Germantown Academy (PA)
- 1909–1911: Ole Miss

Head coaching record
- Overall: 52–31–5 (college)

Nathan Pennypacker Stauffer (January 1, 1875 – June 5, 1959) was an American college football player and coach and physician. He served as the head football coach at Dickinson College from 1896 to 1899, at Pennsylvania Military College—now known as Widener University—from 1900 to 1901, and at the University of Mississippi (Ole Miss) from 1909 to 1911, compiling a career college football coaching record of 52–31–5. Stauffer was one of the first head coaches at a small school to be paid for his work.

== Coaching career ==
=== Dickinson ===
Stauffer was the first head football coach at Dickinson College in Carlisle, Pennsylvania and he held that position for four seasons, from 1896 until 1899. His record at Dickinson was 22–11–2. Dickinson played football as far back as 1885, but no official coach was kept on record prior to Stauffer.

=== Pennsylvania Military ===
After Dickinson, Stauffer became the head coach at Pennsylvania Military College—now known as Widener University—in Chester, Pennsylvania serving for the 1900 and 1901 seasons. His team posted a 7–3 mark his first year and a compiled 3–5 record in 1901.

=== Ole Miss ===
Stauffer served as the head coach at the University of Mississippi (Ole Miss) in Oxford, Mississippi for the 1909, 1910 and 1911 seasons. His record at Ole Miss 17–7–2.

== Medical career and death ==
Stauffer graduated from Jefferson Medical College in 1901. He worked at Bryn Mawr Hospital and Delaware County Hospital and headed the otolaryngology department at Girard College Hospital. He headed the Ear, Nose, and Throat Department at Presbyterian Hospital in Philadelphia for 25 years. Stauffer died on June 5, 1959, in Philadelphia, following a brief illness.

== Head coaching record ==
=== College ===
| Year | Team | Overall | Conference | Standing | Bowl/playoffs |
|---|---|---|---|---|---|
Dickinson Red and White (Independent) (1896–1899)
| 1896 | Dickinson | 4–5 | | | |
| 1897 | Dickinson | 7–3–2 | | | |
| 1898 | Dickinson | 8–2 | | | |
| 1899 | Dickinson | 6–6–1 | | | |
| Dickinson: | | 25–16–3 | | | |
Pennsylvania Military Cadets (Independent) (1900–1901)
| 1900 | Pennsylvania Military | 7–3 | | | |
| 1901 | Pennsylvania Military | 3–5 | | | |
| Pennsylvania Military: | | 10–8 | | | |
Ole Miss Rebels (Southern Intercollegiate Athletic Association) (1909–1911)
| 1909 | Ole Miss | 4–3–2 | 2–3–1 | 8th | |
| 1910 | Ole Miss | 7–1 | 2–1 | T–5th | |
| 1911 | Ole Miss | 6–3 | 2–2 | T–7th | |
| Ole Miss: | | 17–7–2 | 6–6–1 | | |
| Total: | | 52–31–5 | | | |
