= Chigger Browne =

American football player and track coach (1888–1955)

Chigger Brown
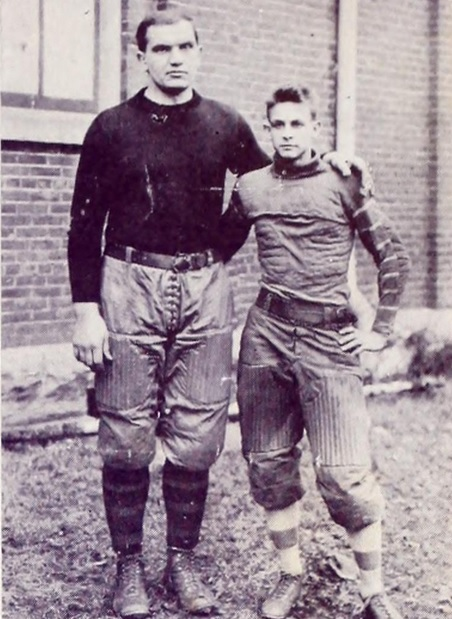

Biographical details
- Born: August 3, 1888; Memphis, Tennessee, U.S.
- Died: March 2, 1955 (aged 66); Stockton, California, U.S.

Playing career

Football
- 1908–1910: Sewanee
- Position: Quarterback

Coaching career (HC unless noted)

Track and field
- 1926–1927: Florida

Football
- 1928: Florida (intramurals)

Accomplishments and honors

Awards
- All-Southern (1909, 1910); Sewanee All-Time Football Team

Alvin Lowell "Chigger" Browne (August 3, 1888 – March 2, 1955) was an American college football player and track coach.

== Sewanee ==
Browne was a quarterback for the Sewanee Tigers of Sewanee: The University of the South from 1908 to 1910. Browne also played baseball, basketball, and track. He was twice selected All-Southern, and mentioned by Grantland Rice as one of the great little men of the sport, once weighing only 111 pounds. He was most often listed as some 5 feet 8 inches tall and 125 pounds. Rice also said he was "harder to surround and tackle than a flea." He could run 100 meters in 10 seconds flat. At Sewanee he was a member of Kappa Alpha Order.

=== 1908 ===
College Football Hall of Fame quarterback Harry Van Surdam, coach of the 1908 team, said of Browne, he "was the greatest quarterback that I have ever seen in my 50 years of being connected with football as a coach and official . . . he was fast as lightning and wasn't afraid of anything. Chigger was so small that we had to keep him taped up to prevent him from getting broken up . . . We had only 18 men on the squad. If we wanted to scrimmage we had to bend the line around."

=== 1909 ===
Browne was quarterback on the SIAA champion 1909 team.

== Coaching career ==
=== University of Florida ===
He coached the Florida Gators track team of the University of Florida in 1926 and 1927.

== See also ==
- 1909 Sewanee Tigers football team
- Tick Tichenor
