= 1909 Georgia Bulldogs football team =

American college football season

1909 Georgia Bulldogs football
- Conference: Southern Intercollegiate Athletic Association
- Record: 1–4–2 (1–4–1 SIAA)
- Head coach: Joseph Coulter & Frank Dobson (1st season)
- Captain: Hugh Bostwick
- Home stadium: Herty Field

1909 Southern Intercollegiate Athletic Association football standings
	Conf.					Overall
Team	W		L		T	W		L		T
Sewanee $	4	–	0	–	0	6	–	1	–	0
Vanderbilt	4	–	1	–	0	7	–	3	–	0
Alabama	4	–	1	–	1	5	–	1	–	2
LSU	3	–	1	–	0	6	–	2	–	0
Georgia Tech	4	–	2	–	0	7	–	2	–	0
Auburn	4	–	2	–	0	5	–	2	–	0
Howard (AL)	2	–	2	–	0	5	–	2	–	1
Clemson	2	–	2	–	0	6	–	3	–	0
Ole Miss	1	–	2	–	1	4	–	3	–	2
Mississippi A&M	1	–	3	–	0	5	–	4	–	0
Georgia	1	–	4	–	1	1	–	4	–	2
The Citadel	0	–	1	–	1	3	–	3	–	2
Cumberland (TN)	0	–	1	–	0	0	–	1	–	0
Mercer	0	–	4	–	0	3	–	5	–	0
Tennessee	0	–	5	–	0	1	–	6	–	2
$ – Conference champion

The 1909 Georgia Bulldogs football team represented the Georgia Bulldogs of the University of Georgia during the 1909 college football season. The Bulldogs completed the season with a 1–4–2 record. The offensive production was quite low, with only 14 points being scored over the course of seven games. The only victory was overTennessee. Georgia suffered its fifth straight loss to Georgia Tech and also lost to rivals Clemson and Auburn.

In September 1909, Joseph Coulter was hired by Georgia as athletic coach for the academic year of 1909–10. In November, Frank Dobson, who had been an assistant coach at Georgia Tech the prior year, was brought in to assist Coulter. Dobson added new trick plays in an attempt to energize the offense. Georgia football records credit Coulter and Dobson as co-coaches for the 1909 season.

The first decade of the 1900s was not kind to Georgia. The Bulldogs played 70 games and had a losing record of 24–38–8, a winning percentage of just .400. This decade was the worst decade in Georgia football history. There were also seven different head coaches during the ten-year period.

== Schedule ==
Date	Opponent	Site	Result	Source
October 9	at The Citadel	College Park Stadium; Charleston, SC	T 0–0	
October 15	Davidson*	Herty Field; Athens, GA	T 0–0	
October 23	at Tennessee	Waite Field; Knoxville, TN (rivalry)	W 3–0	
October 30	vs. Alabama	Ponce de Leon Park; Atlanta, GA (rivalry)	L 0–14	
November 10	vs. Clemson	Augusta, GA (rivalry)	L 0–5	
November 20	at Georgia Tech	Ponce de Leon Park; Atlanta, GA (rivalry)	L 6–12	
November 25	at Auburn	Montgomery, AL (rivalry)	L 5–16	
*Non-conference game

== Sources ==
- Reed, Thomas Walter (1949). Athens, Georgia: University of Georgia Press. History of the University of Georgia; Chapter XVII: Athletics at the University from the Beginning Through 1947 imprint pages 3496–3497
