= Eric Cheape =

American football player (1885–1973)

Profile
- Position: Guard

Personal information
- Born: November 23, 1885; Avon Park, Florida
- Died: October, 1973; Sewanee, Tennessee
- Listed height: 6 ft 1 in (1.85 m)
- Listed weight: 170 lb (77 kg)

Career information
- College: Sewanee (1907–1909)

Awards and highlights
- SIAA championship (1909); All-Southern (1909)

Frederick Peter "Eric" Cheape (November 23, 1885 – October, 1973) was a college football player.

== Sewanee ==
Cheape was a prominent guard for the Sewanee Tigers football team of Sewanee: The University of the South from 1907 to 1909. He was from Avon Park, Florida.

=== 1907 ===
He was a member of the 1907 team, one of Sewanee's greatest.

=== 1909 ===
He was selected All-Southern in 1909, a year in which Sewanee was conference champion.

After his college career he pursued business in Birmingham, Alabama.
