= Savage Stadium =

Football stadium in Oberlin, Ohio

- Interactive map of Savage Stadium
- Full name: Dill Field at Savage Football Stadium
- Former names: Dill Field
- Location: Woodland Street north of Union Street, Oberlin, Ohio 44074
- Coordinates: 41.29931°N 82.22217°W
- Owner: Oberlin College
- Capacity: 3,050
- Surface: Grass
- Scoreboard: Daktronics

Construction
- Built: 1925
- Opened: October 1925
- Closed: November 2013
- Demolished: December 2013
- Cost: $38,000
- Architect: Osborn Engineering Company

Tenant
- Oberlin Yeomen football (1925–2013)

Savage Stadium was a 3,000-seat outdoor, grass-field football stadium, part of a football complex including the adjacent Dill Field, on the campus of Oberlin College, in Oberlin, Ohio.

The stadium hosted primarily Oberlin's varsity football home games. It was formerly the site of Oberlin's home soccer and lacrosse matches as well as track and field meets and includes a seven-lane all-weather running track. However, since the completion of the Fred Shults Soccer Field and Robert Kahn Track in the Fall of 2006, the stadium has been used primarily for football.

== Construction and naming ==
The contract to build the stadium was awarded on June 12, 1925 to the Van Blarcom Company of Cleveland. The Osborn Engineering Company of Cleveland was the architect. The construction was made possible by subscriptions from 826 alumni, present students, and others, who provided funds for the erection of 1,750 seats at $12.50 per seat. These subscribers, known as "Stadium Builders," were given the privilege of purchasing seats for a period of years in the central preferred section of the stand. The new stands were ready for use in October 1925.

The stadium was named for former athletic director Charles W. Savage, who served the college from 1905 to 1918 and from 1920 to 1935. It was during his tenure that the College built several physical education facilities including the stadium.

The new Savage Stadium scoreboard, installed in 2007, was a gift from Robert Fishback '58, a three-sport Oberlin Athlete. The $55,000 scoreboard replaced an older model – also donated by Fishback, in 1987

== Facilities and setting ==
The stadium sat on the far North of the rural Oberlin College campus and is bordered by upperclassmen housing to the East and other athletic facilities to the North, South, and West. Savage stadium facilities included stadium seating for approximately 3,000 people and a press box, reserved for game-day announcers, coaches and statisticians, that holds up to 50.

The playing surface was natural grass throughout its entire existence, utilizing field paint to outline the 120 x 53 yard inbound area (including end zones) and yard lines. At the center of Dill field Oberlin's athletics logo, the stylized letters O and C, were painted facing the seating. Surrounding Dill Field was a seven-lane all-weather outdoor rubber track. Until 2006, the track hosted all of the College's home track & field meets, as well some meets and practices for local area grade schools. The track has gone largely unused by the college since being replaced by Kahn Track in 2006 and has since fallen into disrepair.

The area directly underneath the stadium housed concession stands, equipment storage, and locker rooms for six of Oberlin's men's sports teams: Football, baseball, soccer, lacrosse, track & field, and cross country. It also featured a guest locker room to host visiting teams in those sports.

== Use ==
=== 1925–2006 ===
Up until the Fall of 2006, Savage Stadium played host to most of the college's sports teams. Both men's and women's soccer teams, as well as the football team shared the field during the fall sports season, often leaving the field little time to recover between games. Similarly, during the spring months, men's and women's lacrosse shared the field along with the college's track and field team.

=== 2006–2013 ===
Starting in the fall of 2006, the soccer and lacrosse teams began playing home games at Fred Shults Field, while Track and Field began to hold meets on Robert Kahn Track. By the 2007–08 school year, Savage Stadium hosted primarily football games, with a couple of lacrosse matches being the exception. Until its demolition at the end of the 2013 football season, the stadium was home exclusively to the football program.
