= 1909 LSU Tigers football team =

American college football season

1909 LSU Tigers football
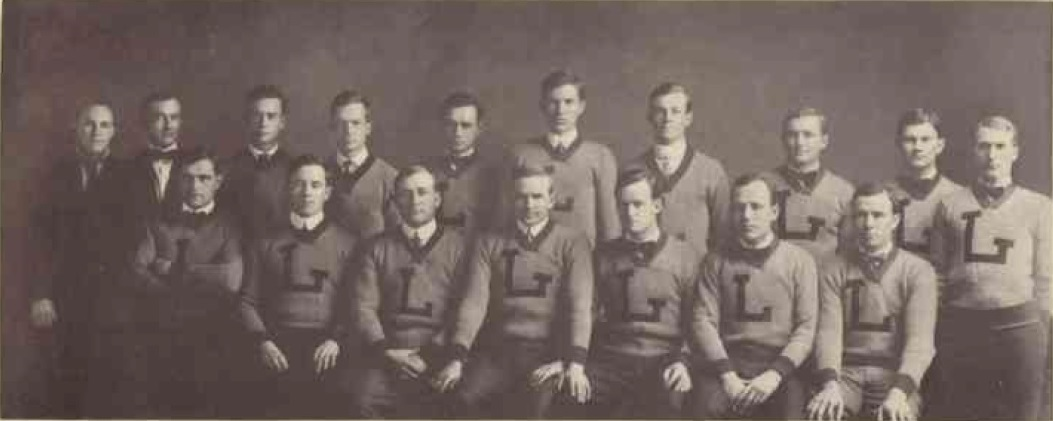
- Conference: Southern Intercollegiate Athletic Association
- Record: 6–2 (3–1 SIAA)
- Head coach: Joe Pritchard (1st season; first 5 games); John W. Mayhew (1st season, final 3 games)
- Captain: Robert L. Stovall
- Home stadium: State Field

1909 Southern Intercollegiate Athletic Association football standings
	Conf.					Overall
Team	W		L		T	W		L		T
Sewanee $	4	–	0	–	0	6	–	1	–	0
Vanderbilt	4	–	1	–	0	7	–	3	–	0
Alabama	4	–	1	–	1	5	–	1	–	2
LSU	3	–	1	–	0	6	–	2	–	0
Georgia Tech	4	–	2	–	0	7	–	2	–	0
Auburn	4	–	2	–	0	5	–	2	–	0
Howard (AL)	2	–	2	–	0	5	–	2	–	1
Clemson	2	–	2	–	0	6	–	3	–	0
Ole Miss	1	–	2	–	1	4	–	3	–	2
Mississippi A&M	1	–	3	–	0	5	–	4	–	0
Georgia	1	–	4	–	1	1	–	4	–	2
The Citadel	0	–	1	–	1	3	–	3	–	2
Cumberland (TN)	0	–	1	–	0	0	–	1	–	0
Mercer	0	–	4	–	0	3	–	5	–	0
Tennessee	0	–	5	–	0	1	–	6	–	2
$ – Conference champion

The 1909 LSU Tigers football team represented the LSU Tigers of Louisiana State University during the 1909 college football season. The LSU team posted a 6–2 record, losing to Southern Intercollegiate Athletic Association (SIAA) champion Sewanee and to an undefeated Arkansas. Notable victories include those over Mississippi and Alabama.

John W. Mayhew, a former halfback at Brown, took over as coach for former Vanderbilt lineman Joe Pritchard midway through the season. College Football Hall of Fame inductee Doc Fenton started at quarterback.

== Schedule ==
Date	Opponent	Site	Result	Attendance	Source
October 2	Jackson Barracks*	State Field; Baton Rouge, LA	W 70–0		
October 9	Ole Miss	State Field; Baton Rouge, LA (rivalry)	W 10–0		
October 16	Mississippi A&M	State Field; Baton Rouge, LA (rivalry)	W 15–0		
October 30	vs. Sewanee	Pelican Park; New Orleans, LA	L 15–6	4,200–7,000	
November 4	vs. Louisiana Industrial*	Ball Park; Alexandria, LA	W 23–0	1,200	
November 13	vs. Arkansas*	Red Elm Field; Memphis, TN (rivalry)	L 16–0		
November 18	Transylvania*	State Field; Baton Rouge, LA	W 52–0		
November 25	vs. Alabama	Birmingham Fairgrounds; Birmingham, AL (rivalry)	W 12–6		
*Non-conference game

== Game summaries ==
=== Jackson Barracks ===
The season opened with a 70–0 win over Jackson Barracks of New Orleans.

=== Ole Miss ===
In a hard-fought game, the Tigers beat the Ole Miss team, 10–0.

The starting lineup was Hall (left end), Hillman (left tackle), Ryan (left guard), Stovall (center), Thomas (right guard), Pollock (right tackle), Seip (right end), Allbright (quarterback), R. F. Stovall (left halfback), McCullam (right halfback), Gill (fullback).

=== Mississippi A&M ===
In the third week of play, LSU swamped Mississippi A&M 15–0.

The starting lineup was Hall (left end), Hillman (left tackle), Falcon (left guard), Stovall (center), Thomas (right guard), Pollock (right tackle), Seip (right end), Fenton (quarterback), R. F. Stovall (left halfback), McCullam (right halfback), Gill (fullback).

=== Sewanee ===
Team	1	2	Total
• Sewanee	9	6	15
LSU	0	6	6

- Location: Pelican Park
  New Orleans, LA
- Game attendance: 7,000
- Referee: James Halligan

LSU lost to SIAA champion Sewanee in New Orleans 15–6. According to Vanderbilt coach Dan McGugin, Sewanee won due to better punting.

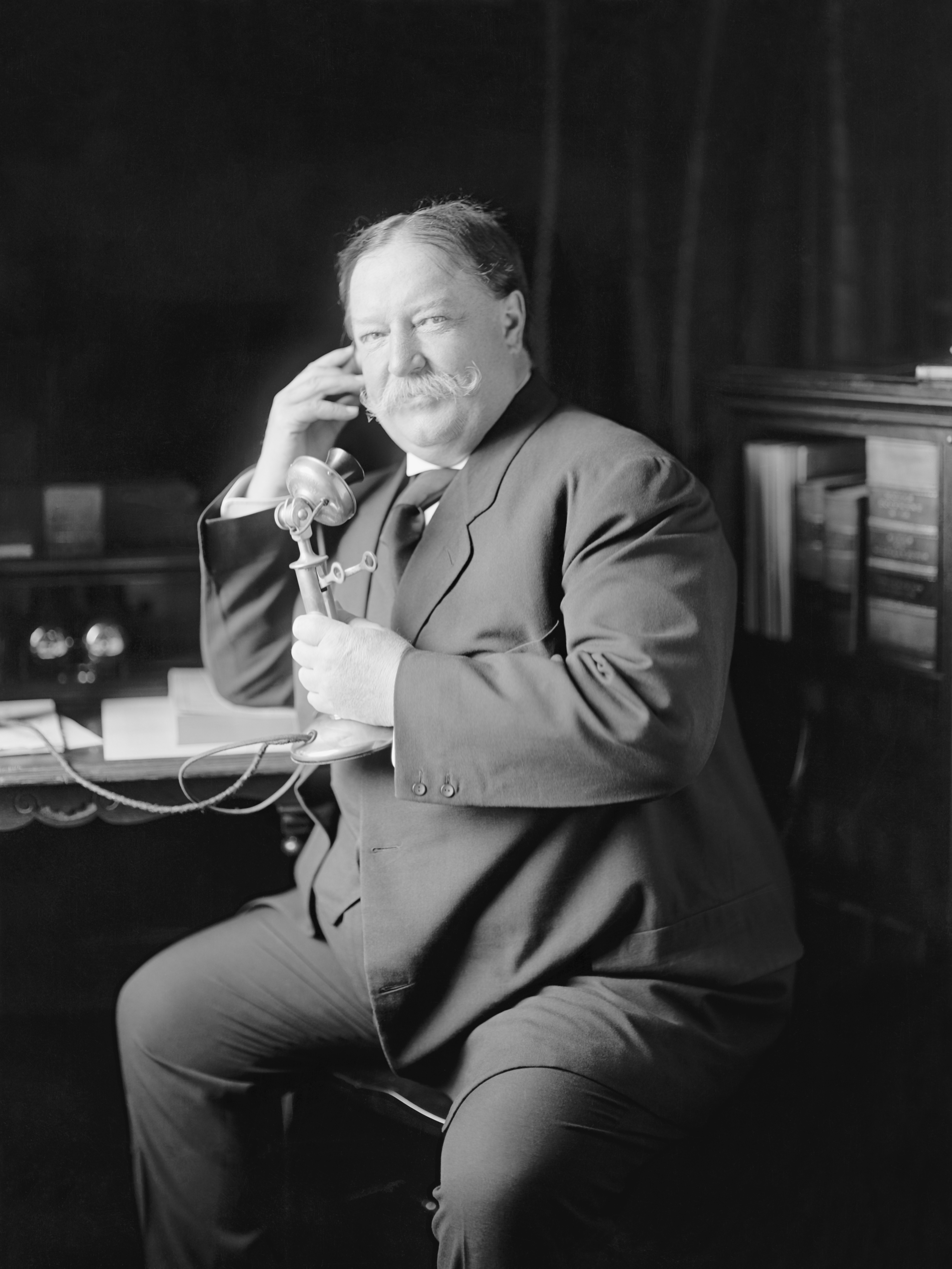
President Taft (pictured) showed up for the Sewanee-LSU game.

Sewanee scored with an Aubrey Lanier touchdown and Moise drop kick in the first half. LSU scored when, after blocking a punt, Robert L. Stovall recovered the ball for a touchdown. Soon after, President William Howard Taft showed up to the game for about ten minutes. Sewanee added another touchdown.

The starting lineup was Williams (left end), Faulkenberry (left tackle), Cheape (left guard), Juhan (center), Cox (right guard), Moise (right tackle), Gillem (right end), Brown (quarterback), Myers (left halfback), Lanier (right halfback), Hawkins (fullback).

=== Louisiana Industrial ===
On a Thursday, LSU beat Louisiana Industrial, 23–0, giving the team its only loss on the season.

=== Arkansas ===
Team	1	2	Total
LSU	0	0	0
• Arkansas	5	11	16

- Location: Red Elm Field
  Memphis, TN
- Referee: Brown

The Tigers were powerless to stop the favored Arkansas Razorbacks in a 16–0 loss. The game was characterized by several offsides penalties on both sides.

The starting lineup was Hall (left end), Hillman (left tackle), Drew (left guard), R. F. Stovall (center), Thomas (right guard), Seip (right tackle), R. L. Stovall (right end), Fenton (quarterback), Gill (left halfback), McCullum (right halfback), Tilley (fullback).

=== Transylvania ===
LSU defeated Transylvania 32–0, scoring at will in the second half.

=== Alabama ===
John Seip starred in the 12–6 victory over Alabama. "The consensus of opinion was that Alabama would have won but for Pratt's absence."

The starting lineup was Hall (left end), Seip (left tackle), Thomas (left guard), Stovall (center), Drew (right guard), Hillman (tackle), R. Stovall (right end), Gill (quarterback), Howell (left halfback), McCollum (right halfback), Ryan (fullback).

== Postseason ==
Fenton was selected All-Southern by John Heisman. End John Seip was selected such by Grantland Rice.

== Roster ==
No.	Player	Position	Height	Weight	Hometown	High School
-	John Albright	quarterback	-	135	-	-
-	S. W. Brannon	halfback	-	160	-	-
-	Harmon Drew	guard	-	175	Minden, Louisiana	-
-	Doc Fenton	quarterback	5'9"	165	Scranton, Pennsylvania	Scranton
-	Reuben Gill	fullback	-	165	-	-
-	J. O. Hall	end	-	165	-	-
-	Willie Hillman	center	-	175	Minden, Louisiana	Minden
-	Levi Himes	-	-	-	-	-
-	Roland Howell	halfback	-	160	-	-
-	Andrew McCollam	halfback	-	160	-	-
-	Phillips	end	-	155	-	-
-	William Pollack	guard	-	180	-	-
-	Warren Ryan	halfback	-	180	-	-
-	John Seip	end	6'1"	185	Allentown, Pennsylvania	-
-	Robert L. Stovall	center	-	135	Dodson, Louisiana	-
-	Rowson Stovall	end	-	140	-	-
-	Arthur Thomas	tackle	-	175	-	-
-	L. R. Tilly	fullback	-	165	-	-
-	-	-	-	-	-	-
-	-	-	-	-	-	-
-	-	-	-	-	-	-
-	-	-	-	-	-	-
-	-	-	-	-	-	-
-	-	-	-	-	-	-
-	-	-	-	-	-	-

Roster from LSU: The Louisiana Tigers
