= Sam Costen =

American football player and coach (1882–1955)

Sam C. Costen
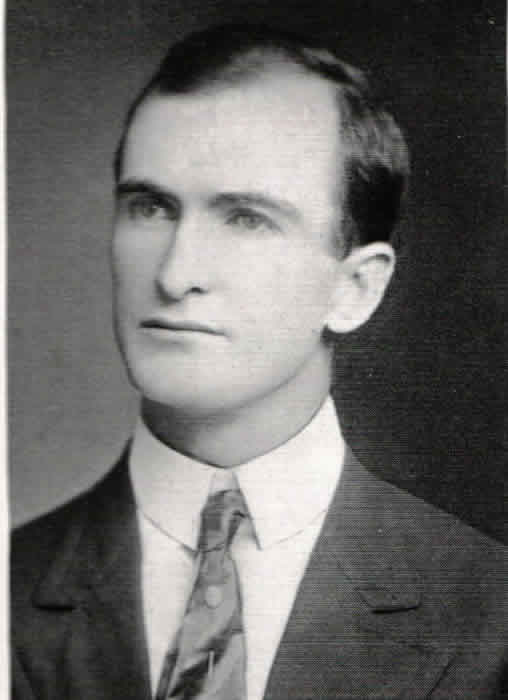

Biographical details
- Born: May 18, 1882; McKenzie, Tennessee, U.S.
- Died: January 21, 1955 (aged 72); Memphis, Tennessee, U.S.

Playing career
- 1906–1908: Vanderbilt
- Position: Quarterback

Coaching career (HC unless noted)
- 1909–1910: The Citadel
- 1911–1912: Vanderbilt (assistant)
- 1913–1919: Blytheville HS (AR)

Head coaching record
- Overall: 7–7–2 (college)

Accomplishments and honors

Awards
- 2× All-Southern (1906, 1907)

Samuel Cutter Costen (May 18, 1882 – January 21, 1955) was an American football player and coach. Costen was a quarterback for Dan McGugin's Vanderbilt Commodores of Vanderbilt University. As a player, he weighed some 150 pounds. He was the third head football at The Citadel, serving two seasons, from 1909 to 1910, and compiling a record of 7–7–2. He also coached in .

Costen graduated from Vanderbilt in 1908 with an LL.B. degree. He was a member of Alpha Tau Omega.

Costen was the first head football coach at Blytheville High School in Blytheville, Arkansas, leading the team from 1913 to 1919. He died on January 21, 1955, in Memphis, Tennessee, where he had lived in the 1930s.

== Head coaching record ==
Year	Team	Overall	Conference	Standing	Bowl/playoffs
The Citadel Bulldogs (Southern Intercollegiate Athletic Association) (1909–1910)
1909	The Citadel	4–3–2	0–1–1		
1910	The Citadel	3–4	1–3		
The Citadel:		7–7–2	1–4–1		
Total:		7–7–2			
