= Joseph Coulter (American football) =

American football coach (1880–1943)

Biographical details
- Born: February 22, 1880; Suffield, Connecticut, U.S.
- Died: October 22, 1943 (aged 63); Westerly, Rhode Island, U.S.

Playing career

Football
- 1901–1904: Brown
- Position: Center

Coaching career (HC unless noted)

Football
- 1905–1906: Brown (assistant)
- 1907: Cheshire Academy
- 1909: Georgia (co-HC)

Baseball
- 1910 (preseason): Georgia

Track and field
- 1905–1906: Brown (assistant)

Head coaching record
- Overall: 1–4–2 (college football)

Joseph Coulter (February 22, 1880 – October 22, 1943), sometimes spelled Colter, was an American college football player and coach. He served as the co-head football coach at the University of Georgia for one season, in 1909.

Coulter was born on February 22, 1880, in Suffield, Connecticut, to James and Martha Graham Coulter. He attended Brown University, where he played on the varsity football, track and field, and water polo teams. He lettered in football from 1901 to 1904. Coulter was an assistant football and track coach at Brown in 1905 and 1906. In 1906, he coached at Holyoke High School in Holyoke, Massachusetts. The following year, he was appointed physical director and head athletic coach at Cheshire Academy, a prep school in Cheshire, Connecticut.

In September 1909, Coulter was hired by Georgia as athletic coach for academic year of 1909–10. In November of that year, Frank Dobson, who had been an assistant coach at Georgia Tech the prior year, was brought in to help Coulter coach the team. Dobson added new trick plays in an attempt to energize the offense. Still the team finished with a record of 1–4–2. Georgia football records credit Coulter and Dobson as co-coaches for the 1909 season. Coulter began coaching the Georgia baseball team in the spring of 1910, but was dismissed from the team and replaced with Frank B. Anderson.

Coulter married Helen Gertrude Tryon on September 8, 1909. During World War I, Coulter was associated with the YMCA and worked with the Italian Army. He later had a trucking business in Wilkinsburg, Pennsylvania before becoming the superintendent of a number of private estates. In 1931, he was appointed superintendent of Wilcox Park in Westerly, Rhode Island. He died on October 22, 1943, following a brief illness, at his home in the park.

== Head coaching record ==
=== College football ===
Year	Team	Overall	Conference	Standing	Bowl/playoffs
Georgia Bulldogs (Southern Intercollegiate Athletic Association) (1909)
1909	Georgia	1–4–2	1–4–1		
Georgia:		1–4–2	1–4–1		
Total:		1–4–2			
