= 1909 Alabama Crimson Tide football team =

American college football season

1909 Alabama Crimson Tide football
- Conference: Southern Intercollegiate Athletic Association
- Record: 5–1–2 (4–1–1 SIAA)
- Head coach: J. W. H. Pollard (4th season)
- Captain: Del Pratt
- Home stadium: The Quad; Birmingham Fairgrounds

1909 Southern Intercollegiate Athletic Association football standings
	Conf.					Overall
Team	W		L		T	W		L		T
Sewanee $	4	–	0	–	0	6	–	1	–	0
Vanderbilt	4	–	1	–	0	7	–	3	–	0
Alabama	4	–	1	–	1	5	–	1	–	2
LSU	3	–	1	–	0	6	–	2	–	0
Georgia Tech	4	–	2	–	0	7	–	2	–	0
Auburn	4	–	2	–	0	5	–	2	–	0
Howard (AL)	2	–	2	–	0	5	–	2	–	1
Clemson	2	–	2	–	0	6	–	3	–	0
Ole Miss	1	–	2	–	1	4	–	3	–	2
Mississippi A&M	1	–	3	–	0	5	–	4	–	0
Georgia	1	–	4	–	1	1	–	4	–	2
The Citadel	0	–	1	–	1	3	–	3	–	2
Cumberland (TN)	0	–	1	–	0	0	–	1	–	0
Mercer	0	–	4	–	0	3	–	5	–	0
Tennessee	0	–	5	–	0	1	–	6	–	2
$ – Conference champion

The 1909 Alabama Crimson Tide football team (variously "Alabama", "UA" or "Bama") represented the University of Alabama in the 1909 college football season. It was the Crimson Tide's 17th overall and 14th season as a member of the Southern Intercollegiate Athletic Association (SIAA). The team was led by head coach J. W. H. Pollard, in his fourth year, and played their home games at the University of Alabama Quad in Tuscaloosa and the Birmingham Fairgrounds in Birmingham, Alabama. They finished the season with a record of five wins, one loss and two ties (5–1–2 overall, 4–1–1 in the SIAA).

Defensively, Alabama had six consecutive shutouts to go 5–0–1 before surrendering a touchdown against Tulane in a 5–5 tie.

== Schedule ==
Date	Opponent	Site	Result	Source
October 2	Union (TN)*	The Quad; Tuscaloosa, AL	W 16–0	
October 9	Howard (AL)	The Quad; Tuscaloosa, AL	W 14–0	
October 16	Clemson	Birmingham Fairgrounds; Birmingham, AL (rivalry)	W 3–0	
October 23	at Ole Miss	Mississippi State Fairgrounds; Jackson, MS (rivalry)	T 0–0	
October 30	at Georgia	Ponce de Leon Park; Atlanta, GA (rivalry)	W 14–0	
November 13	at Tennessee	Waite Field; Knoxville, TN (rivalry)	W 10–0	
November 20	at Tulane*	First Tulane Stadium; New Orleans, LA	T 5–5	
November 25	LSU	Birmingham Fairgrounds; Birmingham, AL (rivalry)	L 6–12	
*Non-conference game

(Note: For the 1909 season, point values were different from those used in contemporary games. In 1909 a touchdown was worth five points, a field goal was worth three points and an extra point (PAT) was worth one point.)

== Game summaries ==
=== Union (TN) ===
Team	1	2	Total
Union	0	0	0
• Alabama	0	16	16

- Date: October 2, 1909
- Location: The Quad • Tuscaloosa, Alabama

Alabama opened the season with this 16–0 victory over Union University at Tuscaloosa. Although scoreless at the end of the first half, Alabama was in position several times to score. The Crimson Tide lost a fumble at the Union five yard line and Derrill Pratt missed field goals of 40, 45 and 53 yards. Alabama scored its first touchdown on a short Jere Austill run early in the second half after the Crimson tide blocked a Union punt at their five-yard line. Pratt and David Palmer scored Alabama's other two touchdowns later in the half en route to the 16–0 win.

=== Howard (AL) ===
Team	1	2	Total
Howard	0	0	0
• Alabama	7	7	14

- Date: October 9, 1909
- Location: The Quad • Tuscaloosa, Alabama

Against Howard, Alabama secured their second consecutive shutout with a 14–0 victory.

=== Clemson ===
Clemson was beaten by a 52-yard Del Pratt field goal. The game was held at the Fairgrounds Race Track at the Alabama State Fairgrounds during the State Fair.

=== Ole Miss ===
Ole Miss and Alabama fought to a scoreless tie.

=== Georgia ===
Georgia was beaten 14–0.

=== Tennessee ===
Tennessee was beaten 10–0.

=== Tulane ===
Tulane and Alabama tied 5–5.

=== LSU ===
Alabama completed their season with a 12–5 loss to LSU at Birmingham to finish 5–1–2.

== Roster ==
Alabama Crimson Tide 1909 roster
Backs: Jere Austill; Randall R. Brown; Farley Moody; Joseph Paul Mudd; Thomas W. Palmer; Del Pratt; Adrian Van de Graaff	Ends: Robert H. Bumgardner; Ewing Carter; Broox Cleveland Garrett; Clarence S. Hurd; Tackles: H. W. Arant; W. A. Barnes; Louis Malone Finlay; Owen Garside Gresham	Guards: E. D. Greene; W. H. Lumley; John Miller; G. W. Pratt; Center: C. C. Countess; Kicker: Everett Wilkinson; Coaching staff: J. W. H. Pollard – Head coach; Hood Craddock – Manager
