= 1909 Georgia Tech Yellow Jackets football team =

American college football season

1909 Georgia Tech Yellow Jackets football
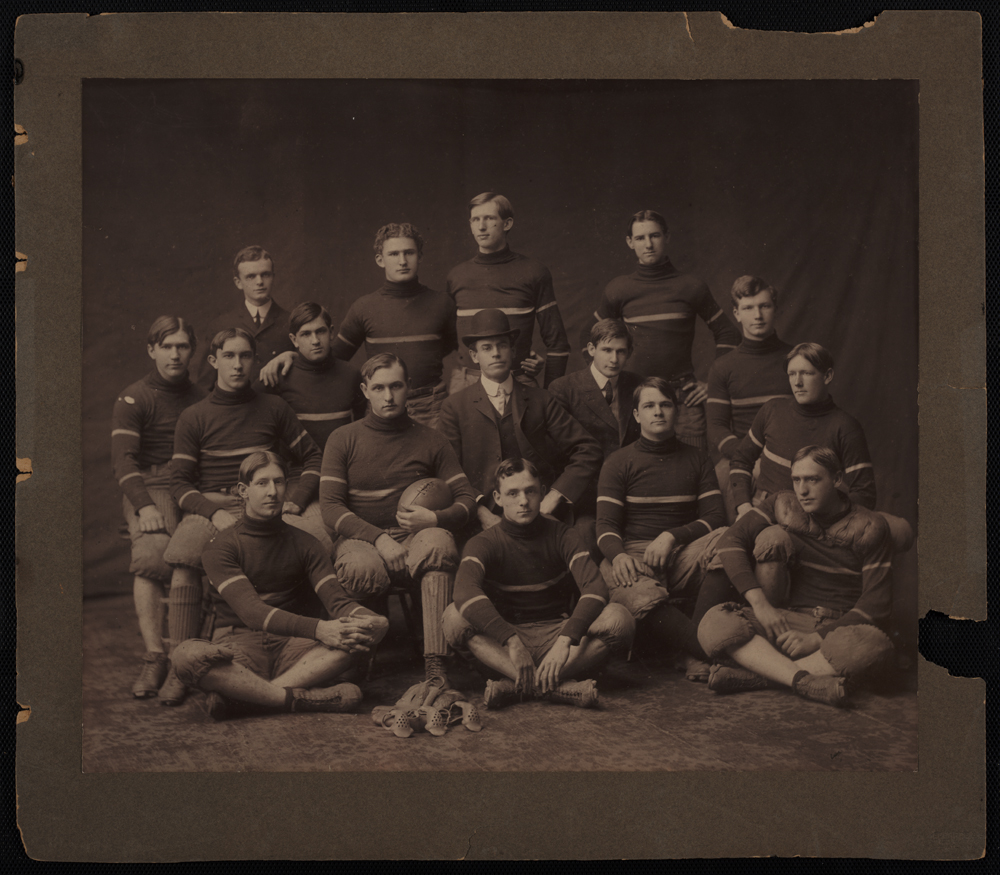
- Conference: Southern Intercollegiate Athletic Association
- Record: 7–2 (4–2 SIAA)
- Head coach: John Heisman (6th season)
- Captain: J. R. Davis
- Home stadium: Ponce de Leon Park

1909 Southern Intercollegiate Athletic Association football standings
| | Conf. | | | | | Overall |
| Team | W | | L | | T | W | | L | | T |
|---|---|---|---|---|---|---|---|---|---|---|
| Sewanee $ | 4 | – | 0 | – | 0 | 6 | – | 1 | – | 0 |
| Vanderbilt | 4 | – | 1 | – | 0 | 7 | – | 3 | – | 0 |
| Alabama | 4 | – | 1 | – | 1 | 5 | – | 1 | – | 2 |
| LSU | 3 | – | 1 | – | 0 | 6 | – | 2 | – | 0 |
| Georgia Tech | 4 | – | 2 | – | 0 | 7 | – | 2 | – | 0 |
| Auburn | 4 | – | 2 | – | 0 | 5 | – | 2 | – | 0 |
| Howard (AL) | 2 | – | 2 | – | 0 | 5 | – | 2 | – | 1 |
| Clemson | 2 | – | 2 | – | 0 | 6 | – | 3 | – | 0 |
| Ole Miss | 1 | – | 2 | – | 1 | 4 | – | 3 | – | 2 |
| Mississippi A&M | 1 | – | 3 | – | 0 | 5 | – | 4 | – | 0 |
| Georgia | 1 | – | 4 | – | 1 | 1 | – | 4 | – | 2 |
| The Citadel | 0 | – | 1 | – | 1 | 3 | – | 3 | – | 2 |
| Cumberland (TN) | 0 | – | 1 | – | 0 | 0 | – | 1 | – | 0 |
| Mercer | 0 | – | 4 | – | 0 | 3 | – | 5 | – | 0 |
| Tennessee | 0 | – | 5 | – | 0 | 1 | – | 6 | – | 2 |
$ – Conference champion

The 1909 Georgia Tech Yellow Jackets football team represented the Georgia Institute of Technology during the 1909 college football season.

== Schedule ==
| Date | Opponent | Site | Result | Source |
|---|---|---|---|---|
| October 2 | Gordon* | Piedmont Park; Atlanta, GA | W 18–6 | |
| October 10 | Mooney* | Piedmont Park; Atlanta, GA | W 35–6 | |
| October 16 | South Carolina* | Ponce de Leon Park; Atlanta, GA | W 59–0 | |
| October 23 | Sewanee | Ponce de Leon Park; Atlanta, GA | L 0–15 | |
| October 30 | at Tennessee | Waite Field; Knoxville, TN (rivalry) | W 29–0 | |
| November 6 | Auburn | Ponce de Leon Park; Atlanta, GA (rivalry) | L 0–8 | |
| November 13 | at Mercer | Central City Park; Macon, GA | W 35–0 | |
| November 20 | Georgia | Ponce de Leon Park; Atlanta, GA (rivalry) | W 12–6 | |
| November 25 | Clemson | Ponce de Leon Park; Atlanta, GA (rivalry) | W 29–3 | |
*Non-conference game
