= 1909 Vanderbilt Commodores football team =

American college football season

1909 Vanderbilt Commodores football
- Conference: Southern Intercollegiate Athletic Association
- Record: 7–3 (4–1 SIAA)
- Head coach: Dan McGugin (6th season)
- Offensive scheme: Short punt
- Captain: Bo Williams
- Home stadium: Dudley Field

1909 Southern Intercollegiate Athletic Association football standings
	Conf.					Overall
Team	W		L		T	W		L		T
Sewanee $	4	–	0	–	0	6	–	1	–	0
Vanderbilt	4	–	1	–	0	7	–	3	–	0
Alabama	4	–	1	–	1	5	–	1	–	2
LSU	3	–	1	–	0	6	–	2	–	0
Georgia Tech	4	–	2	–	0	7	–	2	–	0
Auburn	4	–	2	–	0	5	–	2	–	0
Howard (AL)	2	–	2	–	0	5	–	2	–	1
Clemson	2	–	2	–	0	6	–	3	–	0
Ole Miss	1	–	2	–	1	4	–	3	–	2
Mississippi A&M	1	–	3	–	0	5	–	4	–	0
Georgia	1	–	4	–	1	1	–	4	–	2
The Citadel	0	–	1	–	1	3	–	3	–	2
Cumberland (TN)	0	–	1	–	0	0	–	1	–	0
Mercer	0	–	4	–	0	3	–	5	–	0
Tennessee	0	–	5	–	0	1	–	6	–	2
$ – Conference champion

The 1909 Vanderbilt Commodores football team represented Vanderbilt University during the 1909 college football season. The team's head coach was Dan McGugin, who served his sixth season in that capacity. Members of the Southern Intercollegiate Athletic Association, the Commodores played eight home games in Nashville, Tennessee and finished the season with a record of 7–3 overall and 4–1 in SIAA play.

== Schedule ==
Date	Time	Opponent	Site	Result	Attendance	Source
September 25		Southwestern Presbyterian*	Dudley Field; Nashville, TN	W 52–0		
October 2		Mercer	Dudley Field; Nashville, TN	W 28–5		
October 10		Rose Polytechnic*	Dudley Field; Nashville, TN	W 28–3		
October 16		vs. Vanderbilt alumni*	Dudley Field; Nashville, TN	L 0–3		
October 23		Auburn	Dudley Field; Nashville, TN	W 17–0		
October 30		Ole Miss	Dudley Field; Nashville, TN (rivalry)	W 17–0		
November 6		Tennessee	Dudley Field; Nashville, TN (rivalry)	W 51–0		
November 13		at Ohio State*	University Park; Columbus, OH	L 0–5		
November 20	2:30 p.m.	at Washington University*	Francis Field; St. Louis, MO	W 12–0	5,000	
November 25		Sewanee	Dudley Field; Nashville, TN (rivalry)	L 5–16		
*Non-conference game
