= Silas Williams =

American football player, coach, and lawyer (1888–1944)

Biographical details
- Born: June 9, 1888; Greenville, South Carolina, U.S.
- Died: December 8, 1944 (aged 56); Atlanta, Georgia, U.S.

Playing career
- 1905–1909: Sewanee
- Position: End

Coaching career (HC unless noted)
- 1914–1915: Sewanee (assistant)
- 1919–1921: Chattanooga

Head coaching record
- Overall: 10–15–2

Accomplishments and honors

Awards
- 2× All-Southern (1908–1909); Second-team All-Time Sewanee football team

Silas McBee "Sike" Williams (June 9, 1888 – December 8, 1944) was an American college football player and coach as well as a lawyer.

== Sewanee ==
Williams was a prominent end for the Sewanee Tigers of Sewanee: The University of the South, selected second-team for its All-Time football team, He stood 5'9" and weighed 150 pounds.

=== 1909 ===
Williams was selected All-Southern and captain of the SIAA champion 1909 team.

== Harvard ==
He also attended Harvard Law School, receiving his LL. B. in 1913.

=== Law school football ===
There in a game of all-stars from Michigan, Sewanee, and Vanderbilt against Harvard, including Germany Schulz at center and Vanderbilt coach Dan McGugin at left guard, Williams played on Harvard's team against his former quarterback Chigger Browne. That game ended in a scoreless tie. A second game was played between Harvard Law School and a different "All-Southern" team. Williams scored the only points in the 5 to 0 victory when he ran in a touchdown off a Stephen Galatti pass.

== Chattanooga ==
Williams served as the head football coach at the University of Chattanooga—now known as the University of Tennessee at Chattanooga—from 1919 to 1921, compiling a record of 10–15–2.

== Death ==
Williams died on December 8, 1944, at the Robert Fulton Hotel in Atlanta, after suffering a heart attack.

== Head coaching record ==
Year	Team	Overall	Conference	Standing	Bowl/playoffs
Chattanooga Moccasins (Independent) (1919)
1919	Chattanooga	3–5–1			
Chattanooga Moccasins (Southern Intercollegiate Athletic Association) (1920–1921)
1920	Chattanooga	3–4–1	1–3	T–17th	
1921	Chattanooga	4–6	2–4	T–16th	
Chattanooga:		10–15–2	3–7		
Total:		10–15–2			
