= Pelican Park (New Orleans) =

Sports stadium in New Orleans, Louisiana

- Interactive map of Pelican Park
- Location: New Orleans, Louisiana
- Coordinates: 29.973°N 90.102°W
- Surface: Grass

Construction
- Opened: 1908
- Closed: 1914
- Demolished: 1914

Tenant
- New Orleans Pelicans (baseball) (1908–1914)

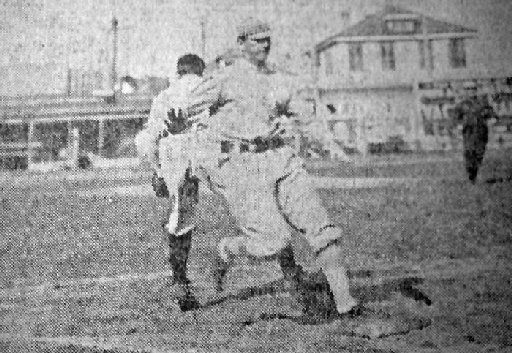
Pelican Park, 1910

Pelican Park was a sports stadium in New Orleans, Louisiana from 1908 to 1914, primarily hosting the Southern Association's New Orleans Pelicans club for the duration of its existence. The ballpark was bound by South Carrollton Avenue, Palmyra Street, Banks Street and Scott Street, across S Carrollton from current-day Jesuit High School. A contest was conducted to name the new ballpark. "Pelican Park" won out over scores of other entries.

When Pelican Park was demolished in 1914, the park's wooden grandstand was disassembled and relocated several blocks down Carrollton Avenue by mule train to the intersection of Carrollton Avenue and Tulane Avenue. It reopened on April 13, 1915, as Heinemann Park, named for Pelicans team president/shareholder and stadium owner Alexander J. Heinemann.

== See also ==
- Sports in New Orleans
