= 1908 College Football All-Southern Team =

American all-star college football team

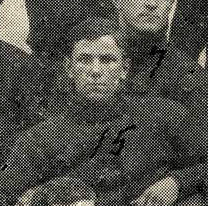
Lew Hardage at Auburn, 1908.

The 1908 College Football All-Southern Team consists of American football players selected to the College Football All-Southern Teams selected by various organizations for the 1908 Southern Intercollegiate Athletic Association football season.

== Consensus eleven ==
The eleven selected by a majority of selectors included:

- Vaughn Blake, end for Vanderbilt. One of the prominent Vanderbilt Blake family, he was later an FBI agent involved in the capture of Alvin Karpis.
- C. C. Countess, center for Alabama. The school's first All-Southern player.
- J. R. Davis, tackle for Georgia Tech; Davis was known as "Twenty percent" because he was considered twenty percent of the team's worth. Vanderbilt coach Dan McGugin wrote, "He has one glaring fault—a tendency to tackle around the eyebrows. Otherwise he is a splendid foot ball man. He weighs two hundred pounds, is never hurt, never fumbles, bucks a line hard and furnishes excellent interference. He was the strength and stay of Tech."
- Frank Faulkinberry, tackle for Sewanee, later a coach at Middle Tennessee State.
- Lewie Hardage, halfback for Auburn, had his breakout season in his first year. Fuzzy Woodruff labeled him the South's "fastest back of the 1910-1920 decade".
- James L. Harris, guard for Sewanee. also played tackle and running back.
- Louis Hasslock, tackle for Vanderbilt. Before Vanderbilt played Michigan, Hasslock had been on duty at Reelfoot Lake with a militia who were to guard against night riders. When he learned he could be granted a leave of absence if he were to join his football team, he walked a distance of twenty miles through a country infested with night riders, and caught a train at Union City. (Note: On October 19, 1908, night riders at Reelfoot Lake, Tennessee kidnapped and murdered Captain Quentin Rankin, an attorney and shareholder in the West Tennessee Land Company. The murder made national news, with coverage emphasizing the night riders' demand for fishing rights. In response, Governor Malcolm Patterson called out the militia to suppress the uprising.)
- Walker Leach, halfback for Tennessee. McGugin noted "All things considered, Leach was perhaps the best football player of the year in Dixie."
- Lawrence Markley, fullback and captain for Sewanee. McGugin wrote of Markley, "He has always been a very stubborn man on the defense, effective on a short plunge, and his cool head has helped to steady his team through many a crisis."
- Ray Morrison, quarterback for Vanderbilt, was the best player on a team of sophomores.
- Walker Reynolds, end for Auburn, was the first cousin of Walker Reynolds Tichenor.

== All-Southerns of 1908 ==
=== Ends ===
- Vaughn Blake†, Vanderbilt (C, H-1, DM, NB, EW, VA)
- Walker Reynolds, Auburn (C, GR-2)
- Silas Williams, Sewanee (H-1, DM)
- Del Pratt, Alabama (EW)
- Carlton Elliott, Virginia (VA)
- Stricker Coles, Clemson (H-2)
- Chip Robert, Georgia Tech (H-2)
- C. Logan Eisele, Sewanee (GR-2)

=== Tackles ===
- Frank Faulkinberry†, Sewanee (C, H-1, DM, NB, VA)
- J. R. Davis, Georgia Tech (C, H-1, DM)
- William Evans, Sewanee (GR-2, NB, EW)
- Oren Noblett, LSU (EW)
- Cecil Garrett, North Carolina (VA)
- W. P. Brown, Tennessee (H-2, GR-2)
- Henry Thomas Burks, Alabama (H-2)

=== Guards ===
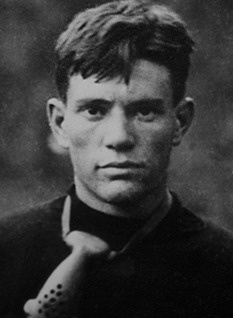
Nathan Dougherty.

- Louis Hasslock, Vanderbilt (C, H-1, DM, NB, EW)
- James L. Harris, Sewanee (C, H-2, GR-2)
- Nathan Dougherty, Tennessee (College Football Hall of Fame) (H-1, DM, NB)
- Willie Hillman, LSU (EW)
- Van Dyke, North Carolina A & M (VA)
- Hoss Hodgson, VPI (VA)
- T. C. Locke, Auburn (H-2, GR-2)

=== Centers ===
- C. C. Countess, Alabama (C)
- Fatty McLain, Vanderbilt (GR-2, DM)
- J. G. Davis, Auburn (H-1)
- Willie Hillman, LSU (NB, EW [as g])
- Robert L. Stovall, LSU (EW)
- William Gloth. Virginia (VA)

=== Quarterbacks ===
- Ray Morrison, Vanderbilt (C, H-2, GR-2, NB [as e])
- Tom McLure, Auburn (H-1, DM)
- Doc Fenton, LSU (College Football Hall of Fame) (NB, EW)
- Sam Honaker, Virginia (VA)

=== Halfbacks ===
- Walker Leach, Tennessee (C, H-1, DM, NB, EW)
- Lewie Hardage, Auburn (C, H-2, GR-2, DM)
- Ike Knox, Ole Miss (H-1)
- Mike Lally, LSU (NB, EW)
- Art Shea, Georgetown (VA)
- Forest Stanton, Virginia (VA)
- Aubrey Lanier, Sewanee (H-2, GR-2)

=== Fullbacks ===
- Lawrence Markley†, Sewanee (C, H-1, DM, NB, EW, VA)
- Clarence McCollum, Tennessee (H-2, GR-2)

== Key ==
Bold = consensus choice by a majority of the selectors

† = Unanimous selection

C = selected by a consensus of newspapers, as published in Fuzzy Woodruff's A History of Southern Football.

DM = selected by Dan McGugin, coach at Vanderbilt University.

H = selected by John Heisman, coach at Georgia Institute of Technology. with help from Grantland Rice. Both Rice and Heisman had separate second teams.

NB = selected by Nash Buckingham in the Memphis Commercial Appeal.

EW = selected by Edgar Wingard, coach at Louisiana State University.

VA = selected by University of Virginia trainers.

== See also ==
- 1908 College Football All-America Team
