= 1908 LSU Tigers football team =

American college football season

1908 LSU Tigers football
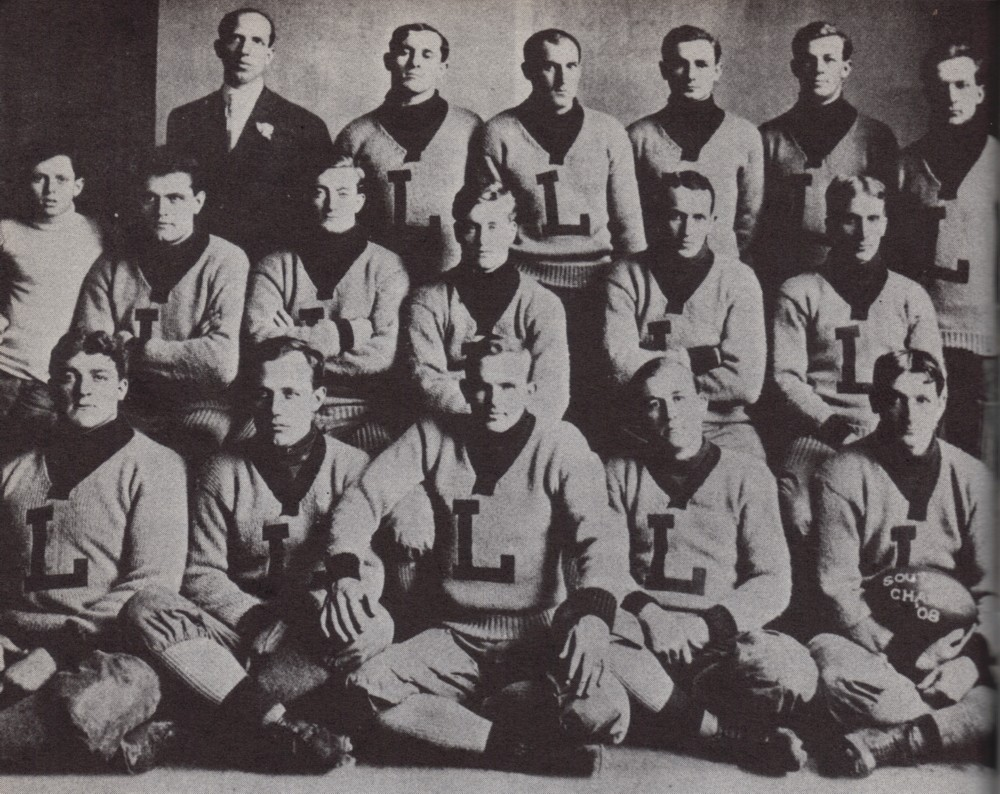

Co-national champion (NCF) SIAA champion
- Conference: Southern Intercollegiate Athletic Association
- Record: 10–0 (2–0 SIAA)
- Head coach: Edgar Wingard (2nd season)
- Captain: Marshall H. "Cap" Gandy
- Home stadium: State Field

1908 Southern Intercollegiate Athletic Association football standings
	Conf.					Overall
Team	W		L		T	W		L		T
LSU +	2	–	0	–	0	10	–	0	–	0
Auburn +	4	–	1	–	0	6	–	1	–	0
Vanderbilt	3	–	0	–	1	7	–	2	–	1
Tennessee	3	–	2	–	0	7	–	2	–	0
Georgia Tech	4	–	3	–	0	6	–	3	–	0
Georgia	2	–	2	–	1	5	–	2	–	1
Alabama	1	–	1	–	1	6	–	1	–	1
Sewanee	1	–	1	–	1	4	–	1	–	3
Mississippi A&M	1	–	3	–	0	3	–	4	–	0
Ole Miss	0	–	2	–	0	3	–	5	–	0
Mercer	0	–	3	–	0	3	–	4	–	0
Howard (AL)	0	–	3	–	0	2	–	4	–	0
Clemson	0	–	4	–	0	1	–	6	–	0
Nashville			–					–
+ – Conference co-champions

The 1908 LSU Tigers football team represented the LSU Tigers of Louisiana State University during the 1908 college football season. The Tigers were coached by Edgar Wingard and posted a perfect 10–0 record, outscoring opponents 442 to 11. The team played its home games at State Field and competed as members of the Southern Intercollegiate Athletic Association (SIAA).

Triple threat quarterback Doc Fenton led the nation in points scored. The Tigers were retro-picked as co-national champion by the National Championship Foundation, and the NCAA recognizes LSU as national champion for that season along with Penn. However, LSU does not officially recognize this season as a national championship season.

The season was clouded by accusations of professionalism by Grantland Rice and rival school Tulane. The SIAA conducted an investigation that cleared LSU of any wrongdoing, but since many publications voted for the SIAA champion prior to the conclusion of the investigation, they did not recognize LSU's title.

== Schedule ==
Date	Time	Opponent	Site	Result	Attendance	Source
October 3		Young Men's Gymnastic Club-New Orleans*	State Field; Baton Rouge, LA	W 41–0		
October 12		Jackson Barracks-New Orleans*	State Field; Baton Rouge, LA	W 81–5	1,000	
October 17		vs. Texas A&M*	Pelican Park; New Orleans, LA (rivalry)	W 26–0	1,800	
October 26		Southwestern Presbyterian*	State Field; Baton Rouge, LA	W 55–0	1,500	
October 31	3:45 p.m.	at Auburn	Drill Field; Auburn, AL (rivalry)	W 10–2		
November 7		Mississippi A&M	State Field; Baton Rouge, LA (rivalry)	W 50–0	1,500	
November 10		Baylor*	State Field; Baton Rouge, LA	W 89–0		
November 16	3:30 p.m.	vs. Haskell*	Pelican Park; New Orleans, LA	W 32–0	3,000	
November 23		at Louisiana Industrial*	Ruston, LA	W 22–0		
November 26		at Arkansas*	West End Park; Little Rock, AR (rivalry)	W 36–4	5,000	
*Non-conference game

== Before the season ==
In 1908, football used a one-platoon system, with players featuring on offense, defense, and special teams. Also, the field was 110 yards in length, touchdowns were worth 5 points, and field goals earned 4 points. The team that scored a touchdown had the option to kickoff or receive. The ball was also much fatter.

The Tigers lost few players from the 1907 team and prospects were bright. Several members of the team came from Pennsylvania, including Doc Fenton, Mike Lally, John Seip, and coach Edgar Wingard. End Rowson "Little" Stovall and center Robert L. "Big" Stovall were brothers.

Lally and Fenton had both previously played for Mansfield Normal School, and Lally was one of the best blockers for Fenton. One of Fenton's favorite plays was the "tackle over tackle" play. In this play, Fenton faked a handoff to a back, then gave the ball to a tackle and led the blocking behind the other tackle. "Doc was the hub," recalled captain and tackle Marshall 'Cap' Gandy, "and we were the spokes." Fenton earned the reputation of doing everything well with a football.

== Game summaries ==
LSU opened the season with two warm-up games, one against the Young Men's Gymnastic Club and the other Jackson Barracks-New Orleans.

=== Y. M. G. C. ===
Team	1	2	Total
YMGC	0	0	0
• LSU	12	29	41

- Location: State Field
  Baton Rouge, LA

LSU beat Tad Gormley's Young Men's Gymnastic Club, winning 41–0.

The starting lineup was: Seip (left end), Gandy (left tackle), Pollock (left guard), R. L. Stovall (center), Hillman (right guard), Noblett (right tackle), Fenton (right end), Gill (quarterback), Stovall (left halfback), C. Smith (right halfback), and Lally (fullback).

=== Jackson Barracks-New Orleans ===
Team	1	2	Total
Soldiers	0	5	5
• LSU	31	50	81

- Location: State Field
  Baton Rouge, LA
- Game attendance: 1,000

LSU swamped the Jackson Barracks-New Orleans 81–5. Fenton was switched to quarterback, swapping places at end with Reuben Gill. One account reads: "In Lally and Fenton the University has a pair that can hardly be equaled. In the game Fenton showed that he has lost none of his ability to dodge, his swiftness as a runner, his power as a punter and kicker, and his cool hard work. ... The two work splendidly together." The soldiers at Jackson Barracks made the only touchdown scored all season on the Tigers, when their halfback Culligan picked up a fumble and ran it back 105 yards. Captain Gandy once had a 40-yard touchdown, and Lally had one score of 60 yards.

=== Texas A&M ===
Team	1	2	Total
Texas A&M	0	0	0
• LSU	15	11	26

- Location: Pelican Park
  New Orleans, LA
- Game attendance: 1,800
- Game weather: Rain
- Referee: James Halligan

The Tigers beat the Texas A&M Aggies 26–0 at Pelican Park in New Orleans in the rain. The Aggies once ran the wrong way.

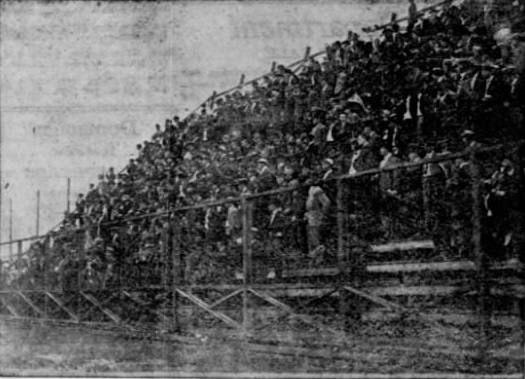
Rooters at the Texas A&M game

The first scoring drive was highlighted by a 14-yard pass from Fenton to Little Stovall, and ended with a Stovall touchdown run around left end. On LSU's second scoring drive, Lally had a 25-yard run, and Fenton eventually went around left end for the score. Before the half ended, Fenton kicked a 25-yard field goal from placement.

LSU's next touchdown came on a fumble recovery by Willie Hillman. The final touchdown was the most exciting, as Mike Lally had a 40-yard touchdown run around right end.

The starting lineup was: Gill (left end), Gandy (left tackle), Pollock (left guard), Hillman (center), Thomas (right guard), Noblett (right tackle), Stovall (right end), Fenton (quarterback), C. Smith (left halfback), Lally (right halfback), and B. Smith (fullback).

=== Southwestern Presbyterian ===
Team	1	2	Total
SWPU	0	0	0
• LSU	18	37	55

- Location: State Field
  Baton Rouge, LA
- Game attendance: 1,500
- Referee: James Halligan

Southwestern Presbyterian (today known as Rhodes College) fell to LSU 55–0. SWPU did not make ten yards all day.

The starting lineup was: Stovall (left end), Gandy (left tackle), Pollock (left guard), Hillman (center), Thomas (right guard), Noblett (right tackle), Gill (right end), Fenton (quarterback), C. Smith (left halfback), Lally (right halfback), and B. Smith (fullback).

=== Auburn ===
Team	1	2	Total
• LSU	5	5	10
Auburn	2	0	2

- Location: Drill Field
  Auburn, Alabama
- Game start: 3:45 pm
- Game weather: 70°, Fair
- Referee: James Halligan

Undefeated LSU met undefeated Auburn for the top spot in the SIAA at the Auburn athletic field. LSU won 10–2, the only game it did not win by more than 20 points.

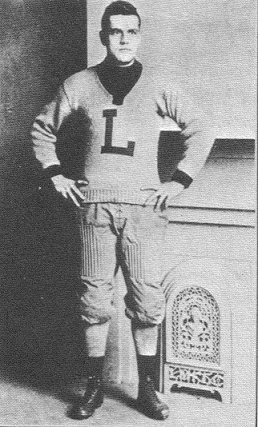
Seip

The first touchdown came on a run from John Seip. Later in the half, Auburn's T. C. Locke blocked an LSU punt which was recovered by Fenton behind his own goal for a safety. According to one source, Fenton was knocked unconscious by a spectator's cane as he tried to get out of the end zone. LSU made the second score using conventional football.

"We won every game that fall except LSU," Auburn star Walker Reynolds told Clyde Bolton in 1973. "But LSU had a pro team."

The starting lineup was: Stovall (left end), Gandy (left tackle), Hillman (left guard), R. L. Stovall (center), Thomas (right guard), Noblett (right tackle), Seip (right end), Fenton (quarterback), Tally (left halfback), C. Smith (right halfback), and B. Smith (fullback).

=== Mississippi A&M ===
Team	1	2	Total
Miss. A&M	0	0	0
• LSU	34	16	50

- Location: State Field
  Baton Rouge, LA
- Game attendance: 1,500
- Referee: Joe Pritchard

LSU won easily over the Mississippi Aggies 50–0, using substitutes by the end of the game.

The first score occurred after five and-a-half minutes had passed, Clarence Smith going through right tackle. LSU then scored a safety by tackling the Aggies punter. Seip then went around end for another touchdown. On the next drive, Seip went 20 yards on a cross play, Fenton hit Seip with a forward pass for 8 yards, and Bob Smith then scored on a trick play. Clarence Smith then got another touchdown, of 25 yards. The highlight of the game followed as Fenton had a 95-yard kick return for a touchdown.

In the second half, Fenton went 30 yards for another touchdown on a return. Gill went around left end for another touchdown. Fenton went 40 yards for the next touchdown. The last touchdown came from Clarence Smith.

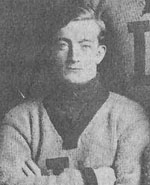
Mike Lally

The starting lineup was: Seip (left end), Gandy (left tackle), Hillman (left guard), R. L. Stovall (center), Pollock (right guard), Noblett (right tackle), Stovall (right end), Fenton (quarterback), C. Smith (left halfback), Lally (right halfback), and B. Smith (fullback).

=== Baylor ===
Team	1	2	Total
Baylor	0	0	0
• LSU	33	56	89

- Location: State Field
  Baton Rouge, LA
- Referee: James Halligan

The Tigers romped 89–0 over Baylor, the second highest score in school history. The highlight of the contest was Mike Lally's 105-yard return for a touchdown. Pat Ryan also had a 75-yard touchdown run.

After the game, Baylor's coach Enoch J. Mills said: "You have, without any doubt, the strongest team in the South by far. The playing of your team here was something wonderful. We were simply badly beaten. You could run up as large a score on Tulane as you did against us without any trouble."

The starting lineup was: Stovall (left end), Gandy (left tackle), Pollock (left guard), R. L. Stovall (center), Hillman (right guard), Neblett (right tackle), Seip (right end), Fenton (quarterback), I. Smith (left halfback), Lally (right halfback), and C. Smith (fullback).

=== Haskell ===
Team	1	2	Total
Haskell	0	0	0
• LSU	10	22	32

- Location: Pelican Park
  New Orleans, LA
- Game start: 3:30 p. m.
- Game attendance: 3,000
- Referee: James Halligan

LSU defeated the Haskell Indians, 32–0, outweighing the Indians and needing little strategy.

Clarence Smith bucked the line for 15 yards and the first touchdown. Fenton later added a 30-yard field goal.

In the second half, Gandy made a touchdown on the "tackle over tackle" play; Bob Smith made another. Clarence Smith made his second touchdown of the day around right end. The final score was a 32-yard end run by Mike Lally.

The starting lineup was: Stovall (left end), Gandy (left tackle), Pollock (left guard), R. L. Stovall (center), Hillman (right guard), Neblett (right tackle), Seip (right end), Fenton (quarterback), C. Smith (left halfback), Lally (right halfback), and B. Smith (fullback).

=== Louisiana Industrial ===
Team	1	2	Total
• LSU	11	11	22
LII	0	0	0

- Location: Ruston, LA
- Referee: Smith

The Tigers beat Louisiana Industrial of Ruston, 22–0. Fenton was the star of the game, with two interceptions for touchdowns.

The starting lineup was: Stovall (left end), Gandy (left tackle), Thomas (left guard), Hillman (center), Pollock (right guard), Noblett (right tackle), Seip (right end), Fenton (quarterback), C. Smith (left halfback), Lally (right halfback), and B. Smith (fullback).

=== Arkansas ===
Team	1	2	Total
• LSU	31	5	36
Arkansas	4	0	4

- Location: West End Park
  Little Rock, Arkansas
- Game attendance: 5,000
- Referee: James Halligan

LSU defeated Arkansas 36–4, with Fenton's runs and kicks featuring throughout. The crowd was the largest ever to see a football game in Arkansas.

LSU made three touchdowns in the game's first four minutes. On the Tigers' first possession, Fenton went 22 yards around right end and Lally then went 40 yards for a touchdown. On the ensuing Arkansas possession, Fenton intercepted a pass and returned it 45 yards for the score. Big Stovall made the third touchdown on an onside kick from scrimmage. LSU also had touchdowns using a triple pass and a double pass.

Arkansas got its points after a 35-yard pass from a fake field goal led to a field goal from the 30-yard line. Fenton had the lone score of the second half, on a 55-yard run and fake pass.

The starting lineup was: Stovall (left end), Gandy (left tackle), Thomas (left guard), R. L. Stovall (center), Hillman (right guard), Noblett (right tackle), Seip (right end), Fenton (quarterback), C. Smith (left halfback), Lally (right halfback), and B. Smith (fullback).

== After the season ==
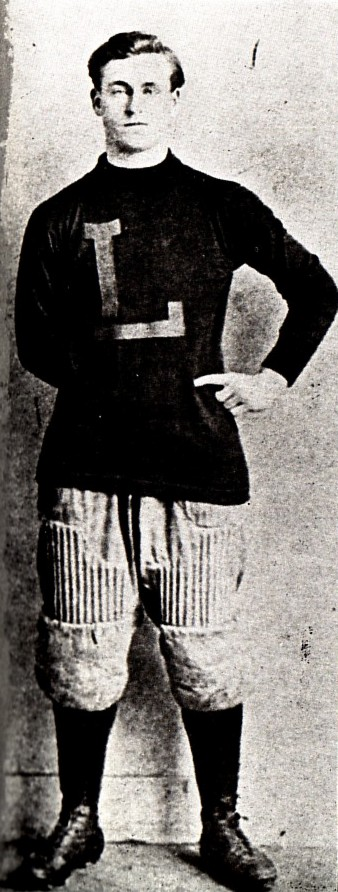
Doc Fenton

=== Disputed title ===
The season was clouded by accusations of professionalism by Grantland Rice and rival school Tulane. Rice claimed V. Smith, C. Smith, Seip, Fenton, Lally, and Gandy were all paid salaries to play football, and that Clarke was a former All-Western player. Amidst fears of many players being ineligible under SIAA rules, most sportswriters instead gave the Southern title to Auburn, and left LSU players off their All-Southern team. A subsequent SIAA investigation cleared LSU of any wrongdoing, but since many publications voted for the SIAA champion prior to the conclusion of the investigation, they did not recognize LSU's title.

=== Awards and honors ===
Fans presented coach Wingard and referee James Halligan with gold-handled umbrellas.

Fenton's 125 points (132 by modern rules) led the nation in scoring. He had a school record 36 extra points and 6 field goals. (Note: The six field goals were surpassed in 1965 by Doug Moreau.) Fenton, Lally, and Willie Hillman were selected All-Southern by Nash Buckingham in the Memphis Commercial Appeal.

=== Legacy ===
The 1908 team is said to be LSU's first great team, and was considered the greatest until 1958.

Fenton and Seip were nominated, though not selected, for an Associated Press All-Time Southeast 1869–1919 era team. Fenton, Lally, Seip, and Noblett made the first-team of an all-time LSU team selected in 1935. (Note: Hillman and Gandy made the second team.) According to Tony Barnhart, Fenton is considered the first great football player in LSU history. The National Football Foundation selected Fenton as the retroactive Heisman Trophy winner of 1908.

== Personnel ==
=== Roster ===
Roster
Player	Position	Height	Weight	Hometown	High School
Doc Fenton	Quarterback	5'9"	165	Scranton, Pennsylvania	Scranton
Willie Hillman	Guard/Center	-	172	Minden, Louisiana	Minden
Mike Lally	Halfback	-	-	Jessup, Pennsylvania	-
John Seip	End	6'1"	185	Allentown, Pennsylvania	-
Robert L. Stovall	Center	-	-	Dodson, Louisiana	-
Oren Noblett	Tackle	-	230	Denham Springs, Louisiana	-
Judge Pollock	Guard	-	173	Bernice, Louisiana	-
Marshall Gandy	Tackle	6'1"	175	Negreet, Louisiana	-
Reuben Gill	End/quarterback	-	-	Ruston, Louisiana	-
Rowson Stovall	Halfback	-	-	Dodson, Louisiana	-
Clarence Smith	Halfback	-	178	Albion, Michigan	-
Bob Smith	Fullback	-	171	Albion, Michigan	-
-	-	-	-	-	-
Pat Ryan	Halfback	6'1"	-	New Orleans, Louisiana	-
Jonnie Albright	Quarterback	-	-	Memphis, Tennessee	-
Claude Harvey	Halfback	-	-	Bunkie, Louisiana	-
O'Bannon	End	-	-	-	-
Arthur Thomas	Guard	-	176	Baton Rouge, Louisiana	-
Sentelle	Guard	-	-	-	-

Roster from LSU: The Louisiana Tigers

=== Scoring leaders ===
The following is an incomplete list of statistics and scores, largely dependent on newspaper summaries.

Player	Touchdowns	Extra points	Field goals	Safeties	Points
Doc Fenton	13	36	6	0	125
Mike Lally	14	7	1	0	81
Clarence Smith	8	0	0	0	40
Bob Smith	7	0	0	0	35
Cap Gandy	6	0	0	0	30
Reuben Gill	4	0	0	0	20
Little Stovall	4	0	0	0	20
Willie Hillman	3	1	0	0	16
Pat Ryan	3	1	0	0	16
Oren Noblett	3	0	0	0	15
John Seip	3	0	0	0	15
Big Stovall	3	0	0	0	15
Unaccounted for v. SWPU	2	0	0	0	10
N/A	0	0	0	2	4
TOTAL	73	45	7	2	442

== Staff ==
- Coach: Edgar Wingard
- Manager: R. L. Himes

== See also ==
- List of undefeated NCAA Division I football teams
