= Auburn–LSU football rivalry =

American college football rivalry

Tiger Bowl
- Auburn Tigers LSU Tigers
- First meeting: November 20, 1901; Auburn, 28–0
- Latest meeting: October 24, 2026; LSU, 38–17
- Next meeting: 2028

Statistics
- Total meetings: 59
- All-time series: LSU leads, 31–24–1
- Largest victory: Auburn, 48–11 (2020)
- Longest win streak: LSU, 6 (1926–1937)
- Current win streak: LSU, 3 (2022–present)

Locations of Auburn and LSU

The Auburn–LSU football rivalry, also known as the Tiger Bowl, is an American college football rivalry between the Auburn Tigers and the LSU Tigers. Both universities have been members of the Southeastern Conference (SEC) since December 1932, but the rivalry dates back to 1901. Auburn and LSU played every year from 1992-2023, when both schools were members of the SEC West Division.

The LSU and Auburn football teams have met 58 times, with LSU holding the all-time lead 33–24–1. This annual matchup was known for wild endings, unusual events, and strong hostility. This rivalry game has been the source of several legendary SEC football games. Including "The Earthquake Game" and "The Barn Burner". CBS college football host Brad Nessler has described the Tiger Bowl as "Where anything can happen".

== Notable games ==
=== 1902 ===
LSU beat Auburn in a hard-fought game 5–0. Captain Henry Landry scored the game's only touchdown. "Nearly every business house in Baton Rouge closed at noon and everybody went to the game". The trip to Louisiana made some Auburn players sick.

=== 1908 ===
In 1908, both teams were undefeated and competing for the top spot in the SIAA. LSU beat Auburn, 10–2, but both teams may claim SIAA championships, for LSU was charged with professionalism and for some stripped of the title. It was the only game of the season in which LSU did not win by more than 20 points. "We won every game that fall except LSU," Auburn star Walker Reynolds told Clyde Bolton in 1973. "But LSU had a pro team."

The first touchdown came from LSU's John Seip. Later, Auburn's T. C. Locke blocked a punt, recovered by LSU quarterback and Hall of Famer Doc Fenton in the endzone for an Auburn safety. According to one source, Fenton was knocked unconscious by a spectator's cane as he tried to get out of the end zone. LSU made the second score using conventional football. LSU would finish the season with an undefeated record, but did not claim the national title.

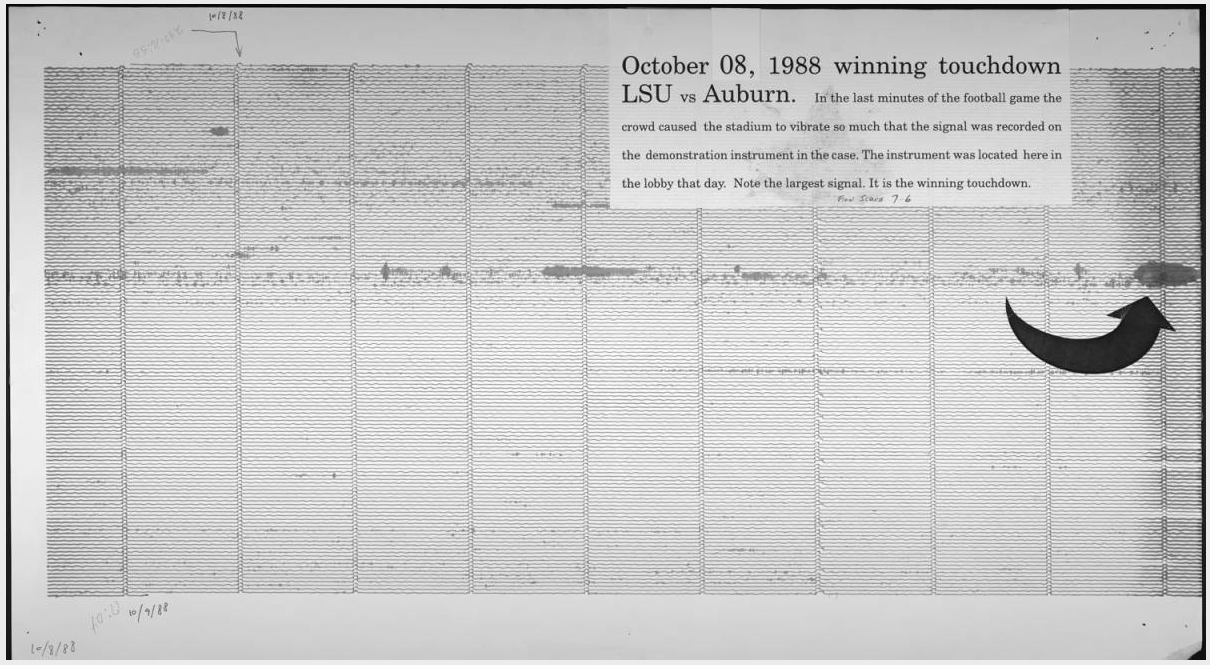
Richter scale from LSU's campus during game winning touchdown in 1988

=== 1988 – "The Earthquake Game" ===
In 1988, #4 Auburn traveled to Tiger Stadium with national title aspirations. Auburn (4–0) entered the game outscoring its opponents 161–44, but were held to just two field goals. Auburn's outstanding defense kept LSU scoreless through 58 minutes. However, with 1:47 left, QB Tommy Hodson found RB Eddie Fuller open on a crossing pattern for a touchdown on fourth and goal. Ironically, it was the same play Fuller had caught on 1st and goal, only to step out of the back of the end zone. The crowd eruption was so intense that it registered as an earthquake on the seismograph located in LSU's Howe-Russell Geoscience Complex, though much of the lore surrounding the game is largely apocryphal. Both Hodson and Fuller later said it was the most physical game of their college careers. College Football News ranks this game as the 17th best finish in the history of college football. Auburn would have likely played Notre Dame for the National Championship had they beaten LSU, as Auburn finished the season with six consecutive wins, giving up only 31 points in the process. Auburn and LSU shared the SEC crown though Auburn went to the Sugar Bowl.

=== 1994 – Five 4th Quarter Interceptions ===
Auburn was on a 14-game winning streak when LSU traveled to Auburn in 1994, but it was LSU who led 23–9 entering the fourth quarter. LSU quarterback Jamie Howard threw five fourth quarter interceptions—three were returned for touchdowns—as Auburn extended their winning streak to 15 games with a 30–26 win. Auburn made one first down in the second half, yet scored 27 points in the comeback. Multiple players were hospitalized for dehydration after the game. After the loss, LSU QB Jamie Howard received multiple threats. LSU followed this collapse by losing six of its next seven, with the lone win in the wretched stretch coming vs. woeful Kentucky by four points, leading to the termination of coach Curley Hallman.

=== 1996 – "The Barn Burner" ===
LSU defeated Auburn 19–15 in 1996 while the old Auburn Sports Arena, affectionately called "the Barn", burned to the ground across the street from Jordan–Hare Stadium. After scoring a touchdown, Auburn trailed 17–15 and attempted the two-point conversion for the tie. However, LSU's Raion Hill intercepted the pass and returned it for a defensive two-point conversion and a 19–15 win. Hill also returned an interception for a touchdown.

The cause of the fire was officially undetermined, though according to investigators the most probable cause was a grill placed too close to the building by tailgaters, possibly to take cover from heavy rainfall. The fire was shown during ESPN's national broadcast, flames being seen as high as the Jordan-Hare east upper-deck. The game was never delayed, and the Auburn public address announcer continually advised fans: "The flames [were] outside the stadium." Because of the fire and the thrilling finish, the game became known as the "Barn Burner" or "The Night The Barn Burned".

=== 1999 – Victory Cigars ===
On coach Tommy Tuberville's birthday, Auburn blew out LSU 41–7 during a rare day game in Baton Rouge. In celebration, Auburn players and coaches smoked cigars on the field at Tiger Stadium, much to the chagrin of LSU players and fans. The intensity of the rivalry grew with this game, and cigars are still seen stands during this matchup. This would be Auburn's last victory in Tiger Stadium until 2021, and the cigars were often referenced as bad luck in causing Auburn's 20 year drought in Tiger Stadium. Years later, Auburn head coach, Tommy Tuberville commented on his team's victory cigars in 1999 that preceded the losing streak in tiger Stadium. "I guess you could call it 'The curse of the cigar,'" said Tuberville.

=== 2001 – Revenge Cigars ===
The 2001 matchup was originally scheduled for September 15, but was moved to December 1 after the September 11 terrorist attacks. LSU fans were eager for a victory over Auburn after feeling disrespected during the last matchup in Tiger Stadium, when Auburn players smoked cigars on LSU's field after defeating the Bayou Bengals, 41–7.

Auburn returned to Tiger Stadium in 2001 with similar behavior. During the pregame warm-ups, Auburn players stomped on LSU's midfield "Eye of the Tiger" logo, resulting in a 15-yard unsportsmanlike conduct penalty. Kicking off from the 50-yard line, LSU recovered the onside kick at the Auburn 36 and scored a touchdown six plays later.

Tensions escalated further when Auburn special teams began their post-halftime warm-ups while the LSU Marching Band was still performing its halftime routine. Kicker Damon Duval got into a squabble with two band members. Later, Tuberville sent a letter of apology to band leader Frank Wickes for Duval's behavior.

LSU ultimately prevailed, 27–14, over Auburn. After the victory, LSU fans mocked Auburn by smoking cigars in the stadium. This game began a 20-year losing streak in Tiger Stadium for Auburn.

=== 2016 – Last Second for Les ===
In 2016, unranked Auburn led #18 LSU by the score of 18–13 with 2:56 left in the game. LSU drove the ball 60 yards to the Auburn 10-yard line with less than 30 seconds remaining. After 3 unsuccessful plays, LSU faced 4th down with the game clock running and only a few seconds remaining. LSU QB Danny Etling quickly approached the line of scrimmage and snapped the ball to give his team one more chance for a victory. Etling avoided a sack by running to the sideline where he threw to the back corner of the endzone to wide receiver DJ Chark for a touchdown with no time left on the clock. The referee signaled touchdown and the LSU players began to celebrate believing they had won the game. However, the referees quickly announced the previous play was under review. After further review, it was determined by the officiating staff that LSU QB Danny Etling did not snap the ball until after the game clock hit 0:00, meaning the game was over and the last play did not count. This ruling gave Auburn the 18–13 victory and LSU their 2nd loss in the first 4 games of the 2016 season. This rough start to the 2016 season along with the disappointment of the 2015 season, led to the firing of LSU head coach Les Miles the following Sunday.

=== 2017 – LSU's comeback ===
In 2017, #8 Auburn led unranked LSU, 20–0, in the 2nd quarter. After a few successful drives and defensive improvements, LSU shrank Auburn's lead to 23–14 at the start of the 4th quarter. LSU continued their comeback with a 75-yard punt return for a touchdown by D.J. Chark and 2 field goals by kicker Conner Culp to clinch the victory with a 27–23 win over Auburn. This game remains as the largest comeback in the LSU–Auburn series.

=== 2021 ===
Auburn and first-year head coach Bryan Harsin travelled to Death Valley to play LSU for the first SEC contest of the 2021 season and completed a comeback from being down, 13–0, to win, 24–19. Auburn quarterback Bo Nix, who was benched the previous week against Georgia State in favor of backup quarterback and LSU transfer T.J. Finley (who made his first SEC start at Auburn the year prior, in a 48–11 Auburn victory on Halloween night), passed for 255 yards and 1 touchdown while running for 74 yards and another touchdown en route to snapping a 10-game losing steak in Tiger Stadium and securing Auburn's first win in Baton Rouge since Tommy Tuberville's first season as head coach in 1999.

=== 2024–present ===
With Oklahoma and Texas joining the SEC in 2024, Auburn and LSU no longer play every year. Auburn and LSU did not play in 2024 or 2025, marking the first time since 1990–1991 that the teams did not meet. Under the nine-game SEC scheduling format starting in 2026, the teams will play twice (home-and-home) every four years, with the next meeting scheduled for 2026 at Auburn.

== Game results ==
Auburn victories	LSU victories	Tie games	Vacated wins

No.	Date	Location	Winning team		Losing team	
1	November 20, 1901	Baton Rouge, LA	Auburn	28	LSU	0
2	October 27, 1902	Baton Rouge, LA	LSU	5	Auburn	0
3	November 11, 1903	Auburn, AL	Auburn	12	LSU	0
4	October 31, 1908	Auburn, AL	LSU	10	Auburn	2
5	November 9, 1912	Mobile, AL	Auburn	7	LSU	0
6	November 1, 1913	Mobile, AL	Auburn	7	LSU	0
7	October 25, 1924	Birmingham, AL	Auburn	3	LSU	0
8	October 16, 1926	Montgomery, AL	LSU	10	Auburn	0
9	October 15, 1927	Montgomery, AL	LSU	9	Auburn	0
10	October 13, 1934	Baton Rouge, LA	LSU	20	Auburn	6
11	November 2, 1935	Baton Rouge, LA	LSU	6	Auburn	0
12	November 14, 1936	Birmingham, AL	#7 LSU	19	#9 Auburn	6
13	November 13, 1937	Baton Rouge, LA	#12 LSU	9	#14 Auburn	7
14	November 12, 1938	Birmingham, AL	#9 Auburn	28	LSU	6
15	November 18, 1939	Baton Rouge, LA	Auburn	21	LSU	7
16	November 16, 1940	Birmingham, AL	LSU	21	#9 Auburn	13
17	November 15, 1941	Baton Rouge, LA	Tie	7	Tie	7
18	November 14, 1942	Birmingham, AL	#14 Auburn	25	#9 LSU	7
19	October 25, 1969	Baton Rouge, LA	LSU	21	Auburn	20
20	October 24, 1970	Auburn, AL	#14 LSU	17	#6 Auburn	9
21	October 14, 1972	Baton Rouge, LA	#8 LSU	35	#9 Auburn	7
22	October 13, 1973	Auburn, AL	LSU	20	Auburn	6
23	October 11, 1980	Baton Rouge, LA	LSU	21	Auburn	17
24	October 10, 1981	Auburn, AL	Auburn	19	LSU	7
25	October 8, 1988	Baton Rouge, LA	LSU	7	#4 Auburn	6
26	October 14, 1989	Auburn, AL	#12 Auburn	10	LSU	6
27	September 19, 1992	Auburn, AL	Auburn	30	LSU	28
28	September 18, 1993	Baton Rouge, LA	Auburn	34	LSU	10
29	September 17, 1994	Auburn, AL	#11 Auburn	30	LSU	26
30	September 16, 1995	Baton Rouge, LA	LSU	12	#5 Auburn	6
31	September 21, 1996	Auburn, AL	#21 LSU	19	#13 Auburn	15

No.	Date	Location	Winning team		Losing team	
32	September 20, 1997	Baton Rouge, LA	#12 Auburn	31	#10 LSU	28
33	September 19, 1998	Auburn, AL	#7 LSU	31	Auburn	19
34	September 18, 1999	Baton Rouge, LA	#24 Auburn	41	LSU	7
35	September 16, 2000	Auburn, AL	#25 Auburn	34	#22 LSU	17
36	December 1, 2001	Baton Rouge, LA	LSU	27	Auburn	14
37	October 26, 2002	Auburn, AL	Auburn	31	#10 LSU	7
38	October 25, 2003	Baton Rouge, LA	#9 LSU	31	#17 Auburn	7
39	September 18, 2004	Auburn, AL	#14 Auburn	10	#5 LSU	9
40	October 22, 2005	Baton Rouge, LA	#7 LSU	20	#16 Auburn	17^{OT}
41	September 16, 2006	Auburn, AL	#3 Auburn	7	#6 LSU	3
42	October 20, 2007	Baton Rouge, LA	#5 LSU	30	#18 Auburn	24
43	September 20, 2008	Auburn, AL	#6 LSU	26	#9 Auburn	21
44	October 24, 2009	Baton Rouge, LA	#10 LSU	31	Auburn	10
45	October 23, 2010	Auburn, AL	#5 Auburn	24	#6 LSU	17
46	October 22, 2011	Baton Rouge, LA	#1 LSU	45	#19 Auburn	10
47	September 22, 2012	Auburn, AL	#2 LSU^{†}	12	Auburn	10
48	September 21, 2013	Baton Rouge, LA	#6 LSU^{†}	35	Auburn	21
49	October 4, 2014	Auburn, AL	#5 Auburn	41	#15 LSU	7
50	September 19, 2015	Baton Rouge, LA	#13 LSU^{†}	45	#18 Auburn	21
51	September 24, 2016	Auburn, AL	Auburn	18	#18 LSU	13
52	October 14, 2017	Baton Rouge, LA	LSU	27	#10 Auburn	23
53	September 15, 2018	Auburn, AL	#12 LSU	22	#7 Auburn	21
54	October 26, 2019	Baton Rouge, LA	#2 LSU	23	#9 Auburn	20
55	October 31, 2020	Auburn, AL	Auburn	48	LSU	11
56	October 2, 2021	Baton Rouge, LA	#22 Auburn	24	LSU	19
57	October 1, 2022	Auburn, AL	LSU	21	Auburn	17
58	October 14, 2023	Baton Rouge, LA	#22 LSU	48	Auburn	18
59	October 24, 2026	Auburn, AL	#18 LSU	38	Auburn	17
Series: LSU leads 31–24–1
† 2012, 2013 and 2015 wins vacated by LSU due to an NCAA ruling.

== Miscellaneous ==
From 2000 to 2005, Auburn or LSU won or tied for the SEC West Division championship every season.

From 2000 to 2007, the home team won eight straight games. (Immediately before then, the road team had won four straight, from 1996 to 1999.)

The 2006 game was the lowest scoring contest between the two schools since 1935, when Auburn defeated LSU, 7–3, in Auburn.

9 of the first 13 meetings were shutouts; however, neither has been shut out since.

LSU leads the series in games played in Baton Rouge and Montgomery, Alabama, with an 18–6–1 and 2–0 record, respectively. Auburn leads games played at Jordan–Hare Stadium (13–7), Birmingham, Alabama (3–2), and Mobile, Alabama (2–0). When the SEC expanded, Auburn and LSU were placed in the SEC's West Division.

== See also ==
- List of NCAA college football rivalry games
