= Willie Hillman =

American football player and business executive

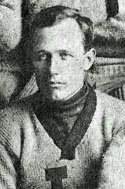

Profile
- Position: Center/Guard

Personal information
- Born: 1884; Minden, Louisiana, U.S.
- Died: Unknown
- Listed weight: 172 lb (78 kg)

Career information
- High school: Minden (LA)
- College: LSU (1906–1909)

Awards and highlights
- National champion (1908); SIAA championship (1908); All-Southern (1908, 1909)

William A. Hillman was a college football player for Louisiana State University and an executive with the Chrysler Corporation in Detroit.

== College football ==
Hillman attended Minden High School. He was a center for the 1908 LSU Tigers football team which went 10–0 and was selected as national champion by the National Championship Foundation. He backed up Robert L. Stovall. Hillman scored a touchdown in the game against Texas A&M. He was selected All-Southern by Nash Buckingham of the Memphis Commercial Appeal in 1908.
