= 1910 College Football All-Southern Team =

American all-star college football team

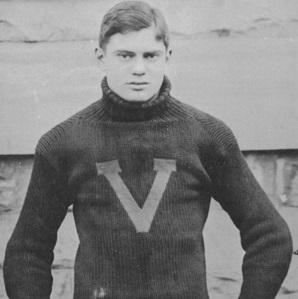
Will Metzger.

The 1910 College Football All-Southern Team consisted of American football players selected to the College Football All-Southern Teams by various organizations for the 1910 Southern Intercollegiate Athletic Association football season. Vanderbilt post the best record in the SIAA, the only blemish on its record a scoreless tie with defending national champion Yale. Auburn also posted an undefeated conference record, but lost to Texas.

== Harvard Law School v. All-Southern ==
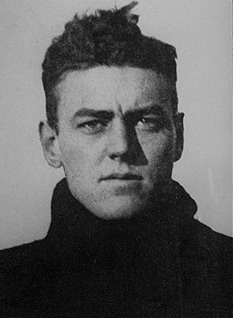
Hamilton Fish.

Hamilton Fish’s "Harvard Law School All Stars" played three games against different "All-Southern" elevens on December 30, 31, and January 2. The one on the 31st had been scheduled for a prior date but had been rained out. The first of these was a scoreless tie on muddy ground; the second a 5–0 Harvard victory, and the third another scoreless tie.

=== Background ===
On December 7 it was announced Fish's team was to play two games against southern teams. On December 28, they would be playing “the pick of Vanderbilt and Suwanee elevens” at Memphis and on the 31st, “the best men from the University of Louisiana and one or two other colleges” at New Orleans. A December 26 wire service article reported that Fielding Yost “may don the moleskin again.” He was coaching a “western all-southern eleven” that was to play Harvard Law School in two days. Joining him from his Michigan squad were Germany Schulz and Andrew W. Smith. The Harvard All Stars made a stop in Cincinnati on their way south. By this time plans had changed and they were to play three games: first a game in Memphis on the 28th, then Michigan–Vanderbilt–Sewanee in Nashville on the 29th, and another in Baton Rouge on their southern tour. The Memphis game on account of rain was then postponed to the 31st.

=== Vanderbilt–Sewanee–Michigan ===
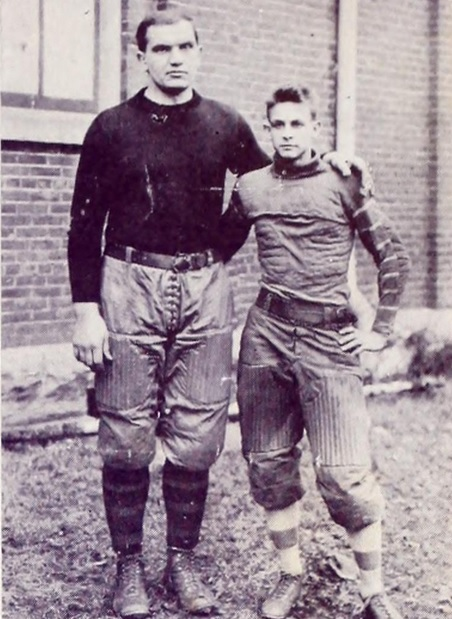
Michigan's Germany Schulz next to Chigger Browne.

A heavy rain also fell in Nashville on the night of the 28th, and while the game had been expected to start at 2 o'clock on the 29th, it was apparently played on the 30th. Yost coached the team and Vanderbilt coach Dan McGugin played in the game for his former coach. "In spite of a muddy field the game was fast from start to finish" on Old Dudley Field in front of 3,000 spectators. Former Sewanee end Silas Williams played for Harvard while taking graduate courses. On a 110 yard field in those days, Fish had run for 100 yards when caught from behind by Browne 10 yards short of the goal. A blow from Michigan's Smith also broke Fish's nose. McGugin "did much brilliant punting." The game ended as a scoreless tie.

The lineup for the Southern team was: Bill Stewart, Vanderbilt (left end), Vaughn Blake, Vanderbilt (left end), Dan Blake, Vanderbilt (left end); Lex Stone, Sewanee (left tackle); Dan McGugin, Vanderbilt (left guard), Andy Powell, Vanderbilt (left guard); Germany Schulz, Michigan (center); Andrew Smith, Michigan (right guard); Frank Faulkinberry, Sewanee (right tackle), Louis Hasslock, Vanderbilt (right tackle); Hager, Vanderbilt (right end), Cecil Covington, Vanderbilt (right end); Chigger Browne, Sewanee (quarterback); Douglas (A. H. Douglas?) (left halfback), John Edgerton, Vanderbilt (left halfback); Bill Neely, Vanderbilt (right halfback); Henry H. Williams, Vanderbilt (fullback). The referee was Bradley Walker.

=== Southern All Stars ===
Originally the first game scheduled in Memphis finally happened on the 31st. It included many Ole Miss players. Earl Kinnebrew was a standout for the southern team. "The Southerners showed unexpected strength in individual defensive work. Kinnebrew, the giant tackle, who made an all Southern eleven this season and who intends to enter Harvard Law School after finishing his course at the University of Mississippi, played against Captain Fish and held his own, according to the verdict of an enthusiastic crowd who flocked to the side lines in spite of inclement weather." Harvard won 5 to 0, the only points a 25-yard pass from Stephen Galatti to Silas Williams.

=== Baton Rouge ===
Then on January 2 Fish's team played a group of LSU players in Baton Rouge. "The game was without question the finest exhibition of football ever given in the state." Harvard was hurt by the injuries and length of the trip, resting in New Orleans before the game. The game ended 0 to 0. Doc Fenton was at quarterback.

== Composite eleven ==
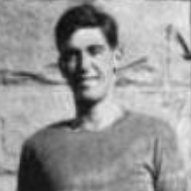
Jenks Gillem.

The composite All-Southern eleven of four sporting writers and three coaches included:

- Chigger Browne, quarterback for Sewanee, rated by Grantland Rice as one of the great little men of the sport, weighing between roughly 110 and 125 at any given point in his career. Rice also claimed he was "harder to surround and tackle than a flea." It was said he could run 100 meters in 10 seconds flat.
- E. L. Caton, center for Auburn, once coach of Howard. John Heisman considered him one of the south's greatest centers. He managed the southern branch of the Pure Oil company in 1922, which marketed Tiolene, Pennsylvania base motor oil.
- Ewing Y. Freeland, tackle for Vanderbilt, known as "Big 'un," coached at various institutions in Texas.
- Jenks Gillem, end for Sewanee. He was also a renowned punter and kicker, selected as the punter for the Associated Press Southeast Area All-Time football team 1869-1919 era. He later coached.
- Earl Kinnebrew, guard for Mississippi, known as "Red." In the prior year's Egg Bowl in which Ole Miss defeated Mississippi State 9 to 5, Kinnebrew was called by the Jackson Clarion-Ledger "the particular star of his team."
- Aubrey Lanier, halfback and captain for Sewanee, known as "Laney". Vanderbilt coach Dan McGugin rated him as one of the greatest he ever saw. Grantland Rice rated him amongst the best ever at punt returns.
- Will Metzger, guard for Vanderbilt, known as "Frog," unanimous selection, selected third-team All-American by Walter Camp, the third Southern player ever to receive such an honor. Metzger is sometimes called coach Dan McGugin's first great lineman. He was a main cog in the 1910 team's 0–0 tie of defending national champion Yale and outscoring of opponents of 165 to 8, and selected for an Associated Press Southeast Area All-Time football team 1869-1919 era.
- Ray Morrison, quarterback for Vanderbilt, selected as the quarterback and kick returner for an Associated Press Southeast Area All-Time football team 1869-1919 era. He was later a coach at various institutions including SMU and Vanderbilt after McGugin. He was inducted into the College Football Hall of Fame as a coach in 1954
- Bill Neely, end and captain for Vanderbilt, the older brother of Hall of Fame coach Jess Neely. Neely spoke of the scoreless tie with defending national champion Yale: "The score tells the story a good deal better than I can. All I want to say is that I never saw a football team fight any harder at every point that Vanderbilt fought today – line, ends, and backfield. We went in to give Yale the best we had and I think we about did it."
- Pat Patterson, tackle for Georgia Tech, captain-elect. He also kicked. Patterson was an electrical engineer.
- Bradley Streit, fullback for Auburn, unanimous selection, led the school in touchdowns in 1910.

== All-Southerns of 1910 ==
=== Ends ===
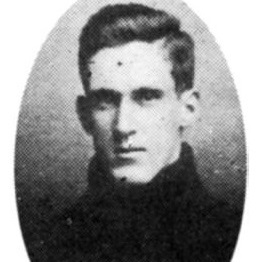
Bill Neely.

- Jenks Gillem, Sewanee (C, GR, DJ-1, H, BC-1)
- Bill Neely, Vanderbilt (C, GR, DJ-2 [as qb], H, BC-2 [as hb])
- Homer Cogdell, Auburn (DJ-1)
- Dean Hill, Georgia Tech (DJ-2, TA, BC-2)
- Cliff Hatcher, Georgia (TA, BC-2)
- Slick Stewart, Vanderbilt (BC-1)
- A. Brown, Vanderbilt (DJ-2)

=== Tackles ===
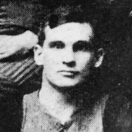
Pat Patterson.

- Ewing Y. Freeland, Vanderbilt (C, GR, DJ-1, H, BC-1)
- Pat Patterson, Georgia Tech (C, GR, DJ-2, H, BC-1)
- Frank Faulkinberry, Sewanee (DJ-1, TA, BC-2)
- Omer Franklin, Georgia (TA)
- E. W. Harmon, Auburn (DJ-2)
- O. G. Gresham, Alabama (BC-2)

=== Guards ===
- Will Metzger†, Vanderbilt (C, GR, DJ-1, H, TA, BC-1)
- Earl Kinnebrew, Mississippi (C, GR, H)
- Burton Gray Allen, Auburn (DJ-1, BC-1)
- B. W. Sinclair, Georgia Tech (TA, BC-2)
- Gallor, Sewanee (DJ-2)
- B. J. Lamb, Auburn (DJ-2)
- J. H. Graham, Tennessee (BC-2)

=== Centers ===
- E. L. Caton, Auburn (C, GR, DJ-1, H, TA, BC-1)
- Frank Juhan, Sewanee (DJ-2, BC-2)

=== Quarterbacks ===
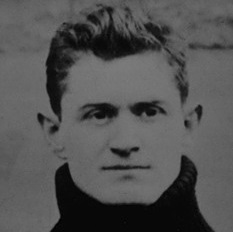
Ray Morrison.

- Chigger Browne, Sewanee (C, GR, DJ-1, H, BC-2)
- Ray Morrison, Vanderbilt (College Football Hall of Fame) (C [as hb], GR [as hb], DJ-1 [as hb], TA, BC-1)

=== Halfbacks ===
- Aubrey Lanier, Sewanee (C, DJ-1, H, TA, BC-1)
- Bob McWhorter, Georgia (College Football Hall of Fame) (GR, DJ-2, H, TA, BC-1)
- John E. Davis, Auburn (DJ-2)
- Kid Woodruff, Georgia (BC-2)

=== Fullbacks ===
- Bradley "Bill" Streit†, Auburn (C, GR, DJ-1, H, TA, BC-1)
- Guy Ward, Sewanee (DJ-2)
- Henry H. Williams, Vanderbilt (BC-2)

== Key ==
Bold = Composite selection

† = Unanimous selection

C = composite of four sporting writers and three coaches.

GR = selected jointly by Grantland Rice and John Heisman in the Atlanta Constitution.

DJ = selected by Dick Jemison, sporting editor for the Atlanta Constitution. It had a first and second team.

H = selected by John Heisman, coach at Georgia Institute of Technology, as published in Fuzzy Woodruff's A History of Southern Football 1890-1928

TA = selected by Tommie Akers, sporting editor for the Atlanta Journal.

BC = selected by Bill Cunningham, coach at the University of Georgia. It had a first and second team.

== See also ==
- 1910 College Football All-America Team
