= C. C. Countess =

American college football player (1885–1960

Profile
- Position: Center

Personal information
- Born: November 6, 1885; Duncanville, Alabama, U.S.
- Died: April 22, 1960; Belton, Texas, U.S.

Career information
- College: Alabama (1908–1911)

Awards and highlights
- All-Southern (1908)

Clem C. Countess (November 6, 1885 – April 22, 1960) was an American college football player and lawyer from Duncanville, Alabama. He was the first All-Southern player for the Alabama Crimson Tide. He began practicing law in Belton, Texas in 1913.
