= John Seip =

American football player (1882–1940)

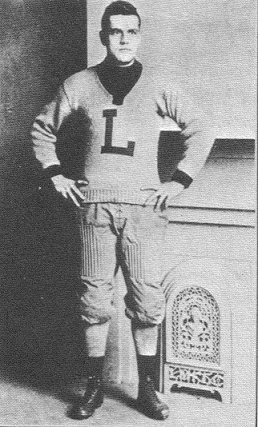

Profile
- Position: End/Fullback

Personal information
- Born: August 14, 1882; Allentown, Pennsylvania, U.S.
- Died: April 20, 1940 (aged 57); Baton Rouge, Louisiana, U.S.
- Listed height: 6 ft 1 in (1.85 m)
- Listed weight: 185 lb (84 kg)

Career information
- College: Louisiana State (1907–1909)

Awards and highlights
- National champion (1908); SIAA championship (1908); All-Southern (1909); LSU Hall of Fame

John Jacob "Bill" Seip (August 14, 1882 – April 20, 1940) was a player of American football at the college level.

== LSU ==
He was a prominent end for the LSU Tigers of Louisiana State University from 1907 to 1909, and was elected to the LSU Hall of Fame in 1937. Seip was also selected for LSU's All-Time football team in 1935. Seip was one of many players on the LSU teams of this era from Pennsylvania, including Doc Fenton and Mike Lally. He was nominated though not selected for an Associated Press All-Time Southeast 1869-1919 era team.

=== 1907 ===
Seip ran back a 67-yard punt return in LSU's first ever bowl game, as well as the first football game played by an American team outside of the United States, the 1907 Bacardi Bowl. LSU beat the University of Havana 56 to 0.

=== 1908 ===
Seip was a member of the 1908 LSU Tigers football team which went 10–0 and was selected as national champion by the National Championship Foundation.

=== 1909 ===
He was selected All-Southern in 1909.

=== 1910 ===
1910 was a disastrous year for the Tigers. After the 1908 campaign, and a strong 1909 campaign which saw their only SIAA loss come to SIAA champion Sewanee, the team lost some star power. Stovall, end, Mike Lally, halfback, and Seip would all be lost for the year. Seip was ruled ineligible the week before the Sewanee game.
