= Kinnebrew =

Kinnebrew is a surname. Notable people with the surname include:

- Earl Kinnebrew (1889–1989), American college football player
- Larry Kinnebrew (born 1960), American football player
