= Mike Lally =

American football player

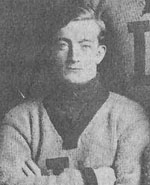

Profile
- Position: Halfback

Personal information
- Born: c. 1888; Jessup, Pennsylvania, U.S.

Career information
- College: Mansfield Normal (1906); LSU (1908–1910)

Awards and highlights
- National champion (1908); SIAA championship (1908); All-Southern (1908); All-time LSU football team (1935)

Michael F. Lally was a college football player who played for Louisiana State University (LSU).

== College football ==
Lally was a halfback for the LSU Tigers of the Louisiana State University, a member of the 1908 LSU Tigers football team which went 10–0 and was selected as national champion by the National Championship Foundation. Lally had a 105-yard punt return for a touchdown in a 89–0 romp over Baylor. He was selected All-Southern by Nash Buckingham in the Memphis Commercial Appeal. He was one of many players on LSU teams of this era from Pennsylvania, including Doc Fenton and John Seip. Lally was one of the best blockers for Fenton. He and Fenton had both played for Mansfield Normal School.

1910 was a disastrous year for the Tigers. After the 1908 campaign, and a strong 1909 campaign which saw their only SIAA loss come to SIAA champion Sewanee, the team lost some star power. Stovall, end, Seip, end, and Lally would all be lost for the year. Lally broke a bone in his leg in the first game of the year. Lally was selected for LSU's All-Time football team in 1935.
