= 1908 College Baseball All-Southern Team =

All-star college baseball team

The 1908 College Baseball All-Southern Team consists of baseball players selected at their respective positions after the 1908 IAAUS baseball season.

== All Southerns ==
=== Pitchers ===
- James Redfearn, Georgia (H-1)
- Harry Harman, Georgia (H-1)
- Mitchell, Mississippi (H-1)
- Walker Reynolds, Auburn (H-2)
- Smith, Alabama (H-2)
- Lane, Trinity (H-2)

=== Catchers ===
- Corlis Buchanan, Georgia Tech (H-1)
- Glenn Colby, Georgia (H-2)

=== First base ===
- Dag Mallory, Mercer (H-1)
- Morton Hodgson, Georgia (H-2)

=== Second base ===
- Smith, Auburn (H-1)
- Suiter, Trinity (H-2)

=== Shortstop ===
- Del Pratt, Alabama (H-1)
- Bond, Vanderbilt (H-2)

=== Third base ===
- W. West, Trinity (H-1)
- S. Ware, Tennessee (H-2)

=== Outfielders ===
- Chip Robert, Georgia Tech (H-1)
- W. Baker, Tennessee (H-1)
- James Watson, Georgia (H-1)
- Frank Foley, Georgia (H-2)
- Pipkin, Vanderbilt (H-2)
- Lee, Clemson (H-2)

=== Utility ===
- Frank Martin, Georgia (H-1)

== Key ==
H = selected by John Heisman It had first and second team.
