= 1908–09 Birmingham A. C. basketball team =

1911–12 Birmingham A.C. college basketball team

1908–09 Birmingham A. C. men's basketball

Southern League Champion
- Conference: Southern League
- Record: 5–4 (5–3 Southern)
- Head coach: Mills
- Captain: Thomas

The 1908–09 Birmingham Athletic Club basketball team won the Southern League championship. The Mobile YMCA team won it on the court, but their best player Albert Haas was ruled ineligible for most of the season. The Southern League folded after one season.

The team featured former Auburn players Bob Y. Ware and Charlie Woodruff.

== Schedule ==
Date time, TV	Opponent	Result	Record	Site (attendance) city, state
January 1*	Birmingham YMCA	W 45–19	1–0	
January 22*	Nashville A. C.	L 18–30	1–1	
January 30*	Atlanta Athletic Club	W 54–9	2–1	
February 3*	Vanderbilt	L 30–33	2–2	
February 5*	Birmingham YMCA	W 37–22	3–2	
February 8*	Mobile YMCA	L 31–52	3–3	
February 9*	Montgomery YMCA	L 20–38	3–4	
February 24*	Mobile YMCA	W 27–18	4–4	
*Non-conference game. (#) Tournament seedings in parentheses.
