= J. G. Davis =

American football center

Auburn Tigers
- Position: Center

Personal information
- Born: October 10, 1887; Gordo, Alabama
- Died: August 24, 1974 (aged 86)

Career information
- College: Auburn (1907–1908)

Awards and highlights
- All-Southern (1908)

James Grover Davis (October 10, 1887 – August 24, 1974) was a college football player, an All-Southern center for the 1908 Auburn Tigers. He also attended the University of Alabama.
