= 1908–09 Georgia Bulldogs basketball team =

American college basketball season

1908–09 Georgia Bulldogs basketball

SIAA co-champion
- Conference: Southern Intercollegiate Athletic Association
- Record: 6–2 (4–0 SIAA)
- Head coach: C. O. Heidler (2nd season)
- Captain: Frank V. Sprecken
- Home arena: Athens YMCA

1908–09 Southern Intercollegiate Athletic Association men's basketball standings
	Conf.				Overall
Team	W		L	PCT	W		L	PCT
Georgia	4	–	0	1.000	6	–	2	.750
Vanderbilt	5	–	0	1.000	11	–	4	.733
LSU	2	–	0	1.000	5	–	2	.714
Auburn	2	–	1	.667	4	–	3	.571
Mercer	1	–	3	.250	1	–	6	.143
Georgia Tech	1	–	4	.200	1	–	6	.143
Sewanee	0	–	1	.000	0	–	1	.000
Mississippi A&M	0	–	2	.000	5	–	5	.500
Cumberland (TN)	0	–	2	.000	0	–	2	.000
Ole Miss		–		–	1	–	4	.200
Howard (AL)	-	–	-	–	-	–	-	–

The 1908–09 Georgia Bulldogs basketball team represented the University of Georgia as a member of the Southern Intercollegiate Athletic Association (SIAA) during the 1908–09 IAAUS men's basketball season. Led by second-year head coach C. O. Heidler, the Bulldogs compiled an overall record of 6–2 with a mark of 4–0 in conference play.

The team was captained by Frank Von Sprecken and included Claud Derrick and Tillou Forbes. Players Howell Peacock, Lewis, and Buttolph were from last year's Southern champion Columbus YMCA team. A game with Vanderbilt to decide the Southern championship never materialized. In 1909, continuous dribbling and shots off the dribble were allowed.

== Schedule ==
Date time, TV	Opponent	Result	Record	Site city, state
January 15, 1909*	Tulane	W 60–36	1–0	Athens YMCA; Athens, GA
January 22	Georgia Tech	W 78–9	2–0	Athens YMCA; Athens, GA
January 28*	A.A.C.	L 30–32	2–1	Athens YMCA; Athens, GA
January 29	at Georgia Tech	W 69–13	3–1	Atlanta, GA
February 4*	Davidson	W 100–12	4–1	Athens YMCA; Athens, GA
February 13	at Mercer	W 60–20	5–1	Macon, GA
February 20	at Auburn	W 48–37	6–1	The Gymnasium; Auburn, AL
*	Columbus YMCA	L 29–44	6–2	Athens YMCA; Athens, GA
*Non-conference game. (#) Tournament seedings in parentheses.
