= Eugene Caton =

American football player, coach, and oil salesman (1889–1979)

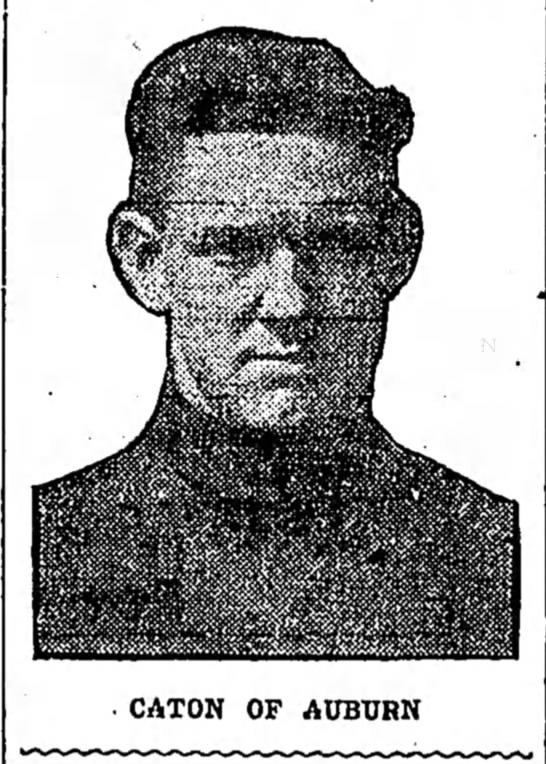

Biographical details
- Born: October 13, 1889; Covington County, Alabama, U.S.
- Died: March 12, 1979 (aged 89); Mobile, Alabama, U.S.

Playing career

Football
- 1909–1911: Auburn
- Position: Center

Coaching career (HC unless noted)

Football
- 1915: Howard (AL)

Baseball
- 1916: Howard (AL)

Administrative career (AD unless noted)
- 1915: Howard (AL)

Head coaching record
- Overall: 3–4–1 (football); 9–12 (baseball)

Accomplishments and honors

Awards
- All-Southern (1910)

Eugene Leon Caton (October 13, 1889 – March 12, 1979) was an American college football player and coach as well as an oil salesman.

== Early years ==
Caton was born on October 13, 1889, in Covington County, Alabama, to Noah Dent Caton and Elizabeth Rousseau.

== Playing career ==
=== Auburn ===
He was a center for the Auburn Tigers of Auburn University. John Heisman considered him one of the south's greatest centers. He was selected All-Southern in 1910. Eugene was the older brother of Noah Caton. He was 171 pounds. In 1915, John Heisman selected the 30 best Southern football players, and mentioned Caton 24th.

== Coaching career ==
=== Howard ===
Caton coached the Howard Bulldogs in 1915.

== Oil salesman ==
Caton managed the southern branch of the Pure Oil company in 1922, which marketed Tiolene, Pennsylvania base motor oil.

== Head coaching record ==
=== Football ===
Year	Team	Overall	Conference	Standing	Bowl/playoffs
Howard Baptists (Southern Intercollegiate Athletic Association) (1915)
1915	Howard	3–4–1	0–3	T–20th	
Howard:		3–4–1	0–3		
Total:		13–4–1			
