= 1908–09 Auburn Tigers men's basketball team =

American college basketball season

1908–09 Auburn Tigers men's basketball
- Conference: Southern Intercollegiate Athletic Association
- Record: 4–3 (2–1 SIAA)
- Head coach: Mike Donahue (4th season)
- Captain: T. C. Locke
- Home arena: The Gymnasium

1908–09 Southern Intercollegiate Athletic Association men's basketball standings
	Conf.				Overall
Team	W		L	PCT	W		L	PCT
Georgia	4	–	0	1.000	6	–	2	.750
Vanderbilt	5	–	0	1.000	11	–	4	.733
LSU	2	–	0	1.000	5	–	2	.714
Auburn	2	–	1	.667	4	–	3	.571
Mercer	1	–	3	.250	1	–	6	.143
Georgia Tech	1	–	4	.200	1	–	6	.143
Sewanee	0	–	1	.000	0	–	1	.000
Mississippi A&M	0	–	2	.000	5	–	5	.500
Cumberland	0	–	2	.000	0	–	2	.000
Ole Miss		–		–	1	–	4	.200
Howard	-	–	-	–	-	–	-	–

The 1908–09 Auburn Tigers men's basketball team represented Auburn University during the 1908–09 college basketball season. The head coach was Mike Donahue, coaching his fourth season with the Tigers.

== Schedule ==
Date time, TV	Opponent	Result	Record	Site city, state
January 8, 1909*	Columbus YMCA	L 14–41	0–1	The Gymnasium; Auburn, AL
January 16, 1909*	Bessemer Athletic Club	L 14–17	0–2	The Gymnasium; Auburn, AL
January 18, 1909*	Tulane	W 29–15	1–2	The Gymnasium; Auburn, AL
January 27, 1909*	Augusta Athletic Assoc.	W 37–9	2–2	The Gymnasium; Auburn, AL
February 4, 1909	at Georgia Tech	W 24–8	3–2	Atlanta, GA
February 20	Georgia	L 37–48	3–3	The Gymnasium; Auburn, AL
	at Mercer	W 26–23	4–3	Macon, GA
*Non-conference game. (#) Tournament seedings in parentheses.
