= Burton Gray Allen =

American football player and dog breeder (1889–1950)

Profile
- Position: Guard

Personal information
- Born: January 7, 1889; Demopolis, Alabama, US
- Died: November 17, 1950 (aged 61)

Career information
- College: Auburn (1908–1911)

Awards and highlights
- All-Southern (1910)

Burton Gray "Scutt" Allen (January 7, 1889 – November 17, 1950) was a college football player and dog breeder. He was a prominent guard for coach Mike Donahue's Auburn Tigers football teams of the Alabama Polytechnic Institute from 1908 to 1911. Allen was selected All-Southern in 1910 by Dick Jemison and Bill Cunningham.
