= Pat Patterson (American football) =

American football player and engineer (1889–1987)

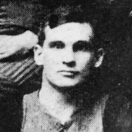
- Patterson cropped from 1910 team photo

Georgia Tech Yellow Jackets
- Positions: Tackle, fullback
- Class: 1912

Personal information
- Born: May 1, 1889; San Francisco, California, U.S.
- Died: March 31, 1987 (aged 97); Columbus, Georgia, U.S.

Career information
- College: Georgia Tech (1909–1911)

Awards and highlights
- All-Southern (1910, 1911); Tech Athletics Hall of Fame

Harman Wayne "Pat" Patterson (May 1, 1889 – March 31, 1987) was an American college football player and engineer.

== Early life ==
Harman Wayne Patterson, known as Wayne or "Pat", was born on May 1, 1889, in San Francisco. His father, Colonel Robert Harman Patterson, was an army officer and the family moved often.

== Georgia Tech ==
Patterson was a prominent tackle and fullback on John Heisman's Georgia Tech Golden Tornado football teams. He also kicked the extra points. Patterson also played baseball at Tech. He was inducted into the Tech Athletics Hall of Fame in 1977.

=== 1910 ===
Patterson was selected All-Southern as a football player in 1910.

=== 1911 ===
He was captain of its 1911 team which included the later coach William Alexander as a reserve quarterback. He was selected All-Southern by Dick Jemison in the Atlanta Constitution.

== After college ==
Following graduation from Tech in 1912, Patterson worked for Stone and Webster, the firm building the Goat Rock Dam in Columbus, Georgia. He was a veteran of the First World War. In 1942, he became vice president and treasurer of the newly organized Home Builders Cooperative. Patterson retired as an electrical engineer for Georgia Power Company.
