= Homer Cogdell =

American football player and US Army captain (1888–1956)

Profile
- Position: Fullback/End/Tackle

Personal information
- Born: April 5, 1888; Inverness, Bullock County, Alabama, US
- Died: October 8, 1956 (aged 68); Alexandria, Virginia, US
- Listed weight: 176 lb (80 kg)

Career information
- College: Alabama Polytechnic (1908–1911)

Awards and highlights
- 3× All-Southern (1909, 1910, 1911)

Homer David Cogdell (April 5, 1888 – October 8, 1956) was an American college football player and US Army captain during World War I. He was also an assistant administrator in the Farmers Home Administration.

== Auburn University ==
Cogdell was a prominent fullback and end for the Auburn Tigers football team of Alabama Polytechnic Institute from 1908 to 1911.

=== 1909 ===
Grantland Rice selected him All-Southern in 1909.

=== 1910–11 ===
He was selected All-Southern again in 1910 and 1911.
