= James L. Harris (American football) =

American football running back and tackle

Sewanee Tigers
- Positions: Tackle, running back

Career information
- College: Sewanee (1905–1906, 1908)

Awards and highlights
- All-Southern (1908)

James L. Harris was a college football player for the Sewanee Tigers football team. As of 1949, he was living in New Orleans. He played as a guard, tackle and a running back. He was selected All-Southern in 1908. His defense made him the star of the Saint Louis game.
