= Duncanville, Alabama =

- Unincorporated community
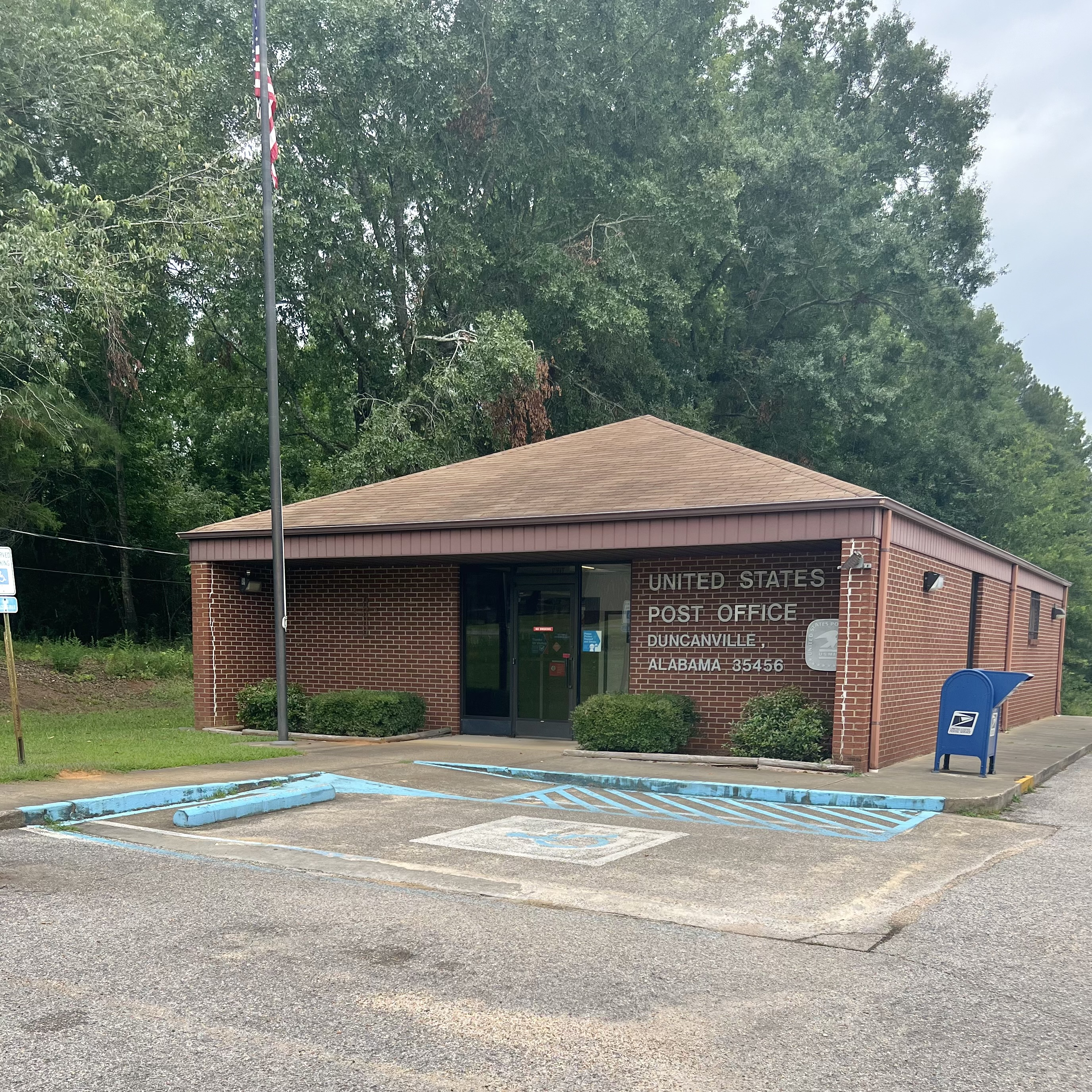
- Motto: Duncanville Alabama Post Office

- Location within Alabama Location within the United States
- Coordinates: 33°03′42″N 87°26′32″W
- Country: United States
- State: Alabama
- County: Tuscaloosa
- Elevation: 243 ft (74 m)
- Time zone: UTC-6 (Central (CST))
  - Summer (DST): UTC-5 (CDT)
- ZIP code: 35456
- Area codes: 205, 659
- GNIS feature ID: 159538

Duncanville is an unincorporated community in Tuscaloosa County, Alabama, United States. Duncanville is located along U.S. Route 82, 12.5 miles (20.1 km) southeast of Tuscaloosa. Duncanville has a post office with ZIP code 35456, which opened on August 22, 1898. Duncanville was named in honor of either William M. Duncan, a local property owner, or W. Butler Duncan, an official with the Gulf, Mobile, and Northern Railroad.
