= Earl Kinnebrew =

American football player (1889–1989)

Profile
- Position: Tackle/Guard

Personal information
- Born: September 16, 1889; Houma, Louisiana, U.S.
- Died: January 1989 (aged 100)
- Listed height: 6 ft 1 in (1.85 m)
- Listed weight: 190 lb (86 kg)

Career information
- College: Ole Miss (1909–1910)

Awards and highlights
- All-Southern (1910)

Earl "Red" Kinnebrew (September 16, 1889 – January 1989) was a college football player.

== Early life ==
Earl Kinnebrew was born on September 16, 1889, in Homer, Louisiana to Alabama Kinnebrew and Mamie Morgan.

== Ole Miss ==
Kinnebrew was a prominent tackle for the Ole Miss Rebels of the University of Mississippi.

=== 1909 ===
In the 1909 Egg Bowl in which Ole Miss defeated Mississippi State 9 to 5, Kinnebrew was called by the Jackson Clarion-Ledger "the particular star of his team."

=== 1910 ===
He was selected All-Southern in 1910. Kinnebrew played in a game on a team of All-Southern all stars against Harvard Law School. Former Sewanee player Silas Williams scored the only and deciding points for Harvard. "The Southerners showed unexpected strength in individual defensive work. Kinnebrew, the giant tackle, who made an all Southern eleven this season and who intends to enter Harvard Law School after finishing is course at the University of Mississippi, played against Captain Fish and held his own, according to the verdict of an enthusiastic crowd who flocked to the side lines in spite of inclement weather."

== Personal life ==
He married Miss Hazel Harris Hope in 1911.
