= Robert L. Stovall =

American football player (1886–1949)

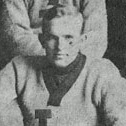
- "Big" Stovall c. 1908

Profile
- Position: Center

Personal information
- Born: February 22, 1886; Dodson, Louisiana, U.S.
- Died: January 8, 1949 (aged 62); Pineville, Louisiana, U.S.
- Listed weight: 140 lb (64 kg)

Career information
- College: LSU (1906–1909)

Awards and highlights
- National champion (1908); SIAA championship (1908); All-Southern (1909)

Robert Luther "Strauss" "Big" Stovall (February 22, 1886 – January 8, 1949) was a college football player and a unit foreman of the state highway department.

== College football ==
Stovall was a center for the 1908 LSU Tigers football team which went 10–0 and was selected as national champion by the National Championship Foundation. His younger brother Rowson Stovall was also on the team, called "Little" Stovall in contrast to his "Big" brother. Robert was selected All-Southern by Grantland Rice in 1909.
