= T. C. Locke =

American football player, adjutant general (1881–1946)

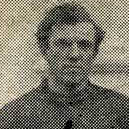

Profile
- Position: Guard

Personal information
- Born: September 10, 1881; London, England
- Died: February 11, 1946; San Francisco, California. U.S.

Career information
- College: Auburn (1907–1909)

Awards and highlights
- All-Southern (1909)

Thomas Courtney Locke (September 10, 1881 – February 11, 1946) was an American college football player and United States Army officer. He served for eight years as adjutant general of Alabama, living in Montgomery. He served in World War I, "one of the most expert rifle shots in the South."

== Early life ==
Locke was a relative of English philosopher John Locke. He was born on September 10, 1881 in London to Richard Langford Locke, who was once a civil engineer in India. Around 1897, his family moved to the American South.

=== Auburn University ===
Locke was a prominent guard for the Auburn Tigers football team of Auburn University from 1907 to 1909.

==== 1908 ====
In the 10–2 loss against LSU in 1908, Locke blocked the punt which Doc Fenton recovered in the endzone for a safety.

==== 1909 ====
Locke was selected All-Southern in 1909. He was also captain of the basketball team. For the first time in 1909, continuous dribbling and shots off the dribble were allowed.

== Military career and death ==
After serving with the Alabama National Guard, Locke joined the United States Army in 1916. He served for 24 years with the United States Army Quartermaster Corps and with the 42nd Infantry Division in the European theatre of World War II. Locke died on February 11, 1946, at Letterman General Hospital in San Francisco. He was buried at San Francisco National Cemetery in the Presidio of San Francisco.
