= 1908–09 Vanderbilt Commodores men's basketball team =

American college basketball season

1908–09 Vanderbilt Commodores men's basketball

SIAA champion
- Conference: Southern Intercollegiate Athletic Association
- Record: 11–4 (3–0 SIAA)
- Head coach: Ed Hamilton
- Captain: Bill Neely
- Home arena: Old Gym

1908–09 Southern Intercollegiate Athletic Association men's basketball standings
	Conf.				Overall
Team	W		L	PCT	W		L	PCT
Georgia	4	–	0	1.000	6	–	2	.750
Vanderbilt	5	–	0	1.000	11	–	4	.733
LSU	2	–	0	1.000	5	–	2	.714
Auburn	2	–	1	.667	4	–	3	.571
Mercer	1	–	3	.250	1	–	6	.143
Georgia Tech	1	–	4	.200	1	–	6	.143
Sewanee	0	–	1	.000	0	–	1	.000
Mississippi A&M	0	–	2	.000	5	–	5	.500
Cumberland	0	–	2	.000	0	–	2	.000
Ole Miss		–		–	1	–	4	.200
Howard	-	–	-	–	-	–	-	–

The 1908–09 Vanderbilt Commodores men's basketball team represented Vanderbilt University in college basketball during the 1908–09 IAAUS men's basketball season. The team posted an 11–4 record and was coached by Ed Hamilton. Georgia and Vanderbilt tied for best record in the Southern Intercollegiate Athletic Association. In 1909, continuous dribbling and shots off the dribble were allowed.

== Schedule and results ==
Date time, TV	Opponent	Result	Record	Site (attendance) city, state
*	Nashville YMCA	W 38–20	1–0	
	at Chattanooga	W 32–17	2–0	
*	at Atlanta A. C.	W 33–26	3–0	
*	Columbus YMCA	L 18–19	3–1	
	Cumberland	W 25–19	4–1	
*	Birmingham A. C.	W 33–30	5–1	
*	Mobile YMCA	L 26–33	5–2	
*	Montgomery YMCA	L 28–32	5–3	
*	Birmingham YMCA	W 30–12	6–3	
*	Chattanooga Ramblers	W 52–23	7–3	
	Sewanee	W 28–19	8–3	
	SW Presbyterian	W 56–19	9–3	
	at Cumberland	W 38–21	10–3	
*	Nashville A. C.	W 43–33	11–3	
*	Nashville A. C.	L 24–25	11–4	
*Non-conference game. (#) Tournament seedings in parentheses. All times are in Central Time.
