= Louis Hasslock =

American football player, colonel, and regimental instructor (1888–1974)

Profile
- Position: Guard

Personal information
- Born: February 8, 1888; Nashville, Tennessee, U.S.
- Died: April 5, 1974 (aged 86); Santa Barbara, California, U.S.
- Listed weight: 173 lb (78 kg)

Career information
- High school: Montgomery Bell Academy
- College: Vanderbilt (1907–1908)

Awards and highlights
- SIAA championship (1907); All-Southern (1908)

Louis Whorley "Red" Hasslock (February 8, 1888 – April 5, 1974) was an American college football player, colonel, and regimental instructor.

== College football ==
Hasslock was a guard for Dan McGugin's Vanderbilt Commodores of Vanderbilt University. He was selected All-Southern in 1908, a year in which he had to contend for a spot with College Football Hall of Fame member Nathan Dougherty. Before Vanderbilt played Michigan in 1908, Hasslock had been on duty at Reelfoot Lake with a militia who were to guard against night riders. When he learned he could be granted a leave of absence if he were to join his football team, he walked a distance of twenty miles through a country infested with night riders, and caught a train at Union City.
