= Doc Fenton =

American football player (1887–1968)

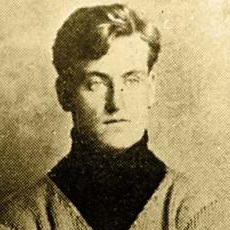

Profile
- Position: Quarterback/End

Personal information
- Born: April 30, 1887; Scranton, Pennsylvania, U.S.
- Died: February 8, 1968 (aged 80); Baton Rouge, Louisiana, U.S.
- Listed height: 5 ft 9 in (1.75 m)
- Listed weight: 165 lb (75 kg)

Career information
- High school: Scranton (PA)
- College: St. Michael's (1904); Mansfield Normal (1904–1906); LSU (1907–1909)

Awards and highlights
- National champion (1908); SIAA champion (1908); NCAA scoring leader (1908); 2× All-Southern (1908, 1909); LSU Athletic Hall of Fame; Louisiana Sports Hall of Fame
- College Football Hall of Fame (Class of 1971)

George Ellwood "Doc" Fenton (April 30, 1887 – February 8, 1968) was an American college football player. He was elected to the Louisiana State University Hall of Fame in 1937 and to the College Football Hall of Fame in 1971.

== Early life ==
Fenton was born on April 30, 1887, in Scranton, Pennsylvania, to Robert Emmett Fenton and Catherine Farr. He was known as "Doc" because his father traveled as a singer with an old time Indian medicine show. Fenton was of French, Irish, and Welsh ancestry.

== College ==
After leaving Scranton High School, Fenton began his college football career at St. Michael's College, in Canada, in 1904. At St. Michael's, he played rugby. Fenton later talked about his time at St. Michael's by stating "I got all the fundamentals playing rugby in Toronto. I learned how to kick on the run, and I learned how to operate in an open field." Fenton earned the reputation of doing everything well with a football.

=== Mansfield ===
He later played football at Mansfield State Normal School (now Mansfield University) in Pennsylvania from 1904 to 1906. He started out as an end at Mansfield, but later became a star receiver in 1906, which was the first year of the legal forward pass. Mike Lally was his teammate at both Mansfield and LSU.

One account reads "In Lally and Fenton the University has a pair that can hardly be equaled. In the game Fenton showed that he has lost none of his ability to dodge, his swiftness as a runner, his power as a punter and kicker, and his cool hard work. ... The two work splendidly together."

=== LSU ===
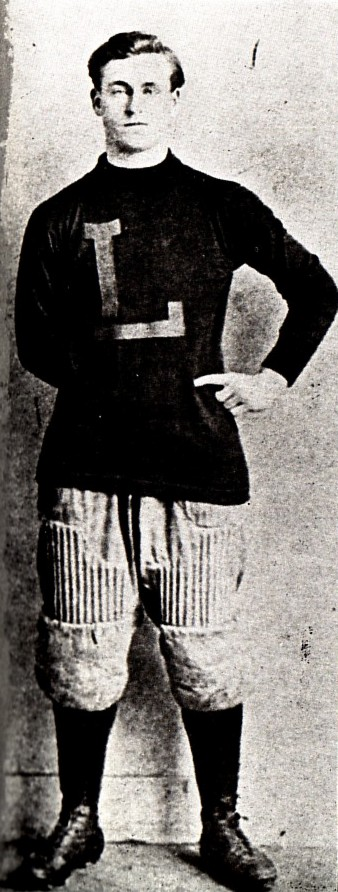
Fenton

Fenton was heavily recruited by LSU and Mississippi A&M (now Mississippi State University). Fenton ultimately ended up signing with LSU for the 1907 season. Fenton was selected for LSU's All-Time football team in 1935. He was nominated though not selected for an Associated Press All-Time Southeast 1869–1919 era team.

One of Fenton's favorite plays was the "tackle over tackle" play. In this play, Fenton faked a handoff to a back, then gave the ball to a tackle and led the blocking behind the other tackle. "Doc was the hub," recalled tackle Marshall "Cap" Gandy, "and we were the spokes." Fenton was referred to as "the Blond Terror" by sportswriters of the time.

==== 1907 ====
Fenton played at end during the 1907 season in which LSU played in the Bacardi Bowl.

==== 1908 ====
He was shifted to quarterback early during the 1908 season. The team went 10–0 and was selected as national champion by the National Championship Foundation.

Fenton's 125 points (132 by modern rules) led the nation in scoring. He had a school record 36 extra points and 6 field goals. (Note: The six field goals were surpassed in 1965 by Doug Moreau.) The National Football Foundation selected Fenton as a retroactive Heisman Trophy winner of 1908. Fenton was selected All-Southern by Nash Buckingham in the Memphis Commercial Appeal.

In the 10–2 win over Auburn, Auburn scored a safety when Fenton was knocked unconscious by a spectator's cane as he tried to get out of the endzone. He returned a kick 95 yards for at touchdown the following week against Mississippi A&M.

==== 1909 ====
Fenton again started at quarterback on the 1909 team which finished second in the SIAA behind Sewanee. He was selected All-Southern by John Heisman.

== Later life ==
George Ellwood "Doc" Fenton was married to the former Gertrude Bauer (1888-1982). The couple had two children, Gertrude Elwood Fenton Renfroe (1912-1993) and Dr. Thomas Terry Fenton (1916-2006) All are interred at Roselawn Memorial Park in Baton Rouge, Louisiana.

In 1940, Doc Fenton was a tax collector with the Department of State.
