= Walker Reynolds =

American football and baseball player (1888–1977)

Profile
- Positions: Halfback, end

Personal information
- Born: September 12, 1888; Rendalia, Alabama, U.S.
- Died: March 1977

Career information
- High school: Georgia Military Academy
- College: Auburn (1908–1909)

Awards and highlights
- SIAA Championship (1908); All-Southern (1908)

Walker Reynolds (September 12, 1888 – March 1977) was an American college football and baseball player. He was an end for the Auburn Tigers football team, captain of the 1909 team. He was also a pitcher on the baseball team. Walker Reynolds Tichenor was his first cousin.

Reynolds joined the Alabama Pipe Company in 1924 and retired in 1959.
