= Mythical national championship =

National championship recognition that is not explicitly competitive

A mythical national championship (sometimes abbreviated MNC) is national championship recognition that is not explicitly competitive. This phrase has often been invoked in reference to American college football, because the National Collegiate Athletic Association (NCAA) does not sponsor a playoff-style tournament or recognize official national champions for the Football Bowl Subdivision (FBS). The relevant recognition before 1998 came from various entities, including coach polls and media ballots, which each voted to recognize their own national champions, and is similar to the newspaper decision used in early boxing matches. Starting in 1998, national champion recognition was determined by the Bowl Championship Series (BCS) until it was replaced by the College Football Playoff (CFP) in 2014; neither system has ever been sanctioned by the NCAA to determine the national champion.

== College football ==
If there are any Big Ten teams that shoot for a national championship, they're damn fools...You play to win the Big Ten championship, and if you win it and go to the Rose Bowl and win it, then you've had a great season. If they choose to vote you number one, then you're the national champion. But a national champion is a mythical national champion, and I think you guys ought to know that. It's mythical.

— Bo Schembechler of Michigan, July 1989

"Mythical national champion" is a term that has been used since at least 1920 for a championship won by an NCAA Division I football team, especially for titles won before the Bowl Championship Series (BCS) system began in 1998. Before the BCS, polls in which coaches and/or sportswriters voted, such as the AP, UPI, and USA Today polls, awarded championships. This led to seasons in which two or more teams could claim to have won the national championship. Due to this, the NCAA does not designate a national champion for the sport in its record book.

Since the 1930s, each top team has traditionally played a single postseason bowl game. The process of selecting a national champion during this time was complicated by the fact that the champions of major conferences were tied to specific bowls (for example, the Big 8 champion was tied to the Orange Bowl), and the top two teams in the nation often played in different bowls. A few bowls over the years featured a #1 vs. #2 matchup; one example was the 1987 Fiesta Bowl, played January 2 following the 1986 season.

Two attempts to annually crown a champion on the field were the Bowl Coalition (1992–94) and Bowl Alliance (1995–97). However, their effort to host a national championship was hampered by the lack of participation of the Pac-10 and Big Ten champions, who instead opted to play in the Rose Bowl.

The BCS was an improvement on the Bowl Coalition and Bowl Alliance because it included the Rose Bowl and the champions of what were then the nation's six most powerful conferences. It attempted to eliminate uncertainty by ranking college teams and inviting the top two teams at the end of the regular season to play in a championship game. These teams were determined by the BCS ranking formula, which itself used a combination of human voter polls and computer rankings. The process of selecting the two best teams for the BCS championship game had nonetheless resulted in controversy, which reached a head in 2003 when the AP poll refused to vote the BCS champions (LSU) as their national champions. Instead, the AP voted USC as national champions for the 2003 season. This resulted in disputes between which team was the real champion, and as a result, the 2003 BCS Champion is not unanimous. As a result of this controversy, the AP removed itself from the BCS formula in 2004. Furthermore, because of AP Poll policies, should a team under a postseason ban finish first in the AP Poll, the AP will recognise such team as the AP's national champion. The AP will also not recognize further penalties, which resulted in a vacated national championship in 2004 by most authorities, but the AP still recognizes USC (which was stripped by the NCAA of wins and the BCS committee of its championship) despite the Reggie Bush penalties.

Since the 2014 season, the College Football Playoff—in association with Division I FBS collegiate conferences and independent schools, along with six bowl games—has been played. Through the 2023 season, the CFP featured the top four teams (as selected by a thirteen-member committee) to play two semifinal bowl games followed by a CFP National Championship Game between the semifinal winners. However, the panel has been criticized for failing to recognize champions of conferences outside the power conferences for participation in the CFP or the New Year's Six games. Since the 2024 season, the CFP has featured 12 teams, selected by the same committee used in the competition's four-team era. The New Year's Six games now serve as the quarterfinal and semifinal sites, with each game hosting two quarterfinals and one semifinal in a three-year rotation.

At lower levels of play in college football, mythical national champion crowns also continue to exist, separate from NCAA and NAIA championships, in the form of the black college football national championship. This is competed for by teams from historically black colleges and universities (HBCUs). In the present day, the winner of this crown at the NCAA Division I FCS level is generally considered to be the winner of the Celebration Bowl, DI FCS's only bowl game.

== College basketball ==
1929 Butler basketball national championship trophy awarded by the Veteran Athletes of Philadelphia

The national championship of collegiate basketball that is officially recognized by the main governing body for collegiate athletics in the United States, the NCAA, has been awarded to the champion of an annual national post-season tournament run by the NCAA since 1939. National post-season college basketball tournaments began in earnest with the NAIA national men's basketball championship in 1937, the National Invitation Tournament (NIT) in 1938, and the NCAA tournament in 1939.

The Official NCAA Men's Basketball Records Book lists title selections of pre-tournament era teams by the Helms Athletic Foundation. The Helms Foundation's Bill Schroeder named a national champion from 1901 to 1982, with his selections from 1901 to 1941 being named retroactively in 1943 and 1957. The Helms champion, for the years in which the NIT and NCAA post-season tournaments were played, reflected the winners of the 1938 NIT and 1939 NIT, as well as the winners for all years of the NCAA tournament except for 1939, 1940, 1944 and 1954. Most recently, the retroactive end-of-year Premo-Porretta Power Poll has provided the first national rankings of college basketball teams for the 1895–96 through the 1947–48 seasons. (No regular, recognized national polling took place prior to the establishment of the Associated Press poll and the coaches poll for college basketball prior to the 1948–49 and 1950–51 seasons, respectively.) The Premo-Porretta rankings were published in 2009 in the ESPN College Basketball Encyclopedia. The poll's top team selections differed from the results of the NCAA tournament in 1939, 1941, 1943, 1944, 1945, and 1947.

During World War II, from 1943 to 1945, the NCAA, NIT and Madison Square Garden cooperated to host "mythical national championship games" between winners of each year's NCAA and NIT tournaments in order to benefit the American Red Cross' War Fund. The series was described by Ray Meyer, coach of the losing 1945 DePaul team, as "the games for the national championship". The NCAA champion prevailed in all three games.

During the early years of the two tournaments, the NCAA and NIT competed against each other, giving rise to debate over their relative prowess. In 1939, the inaugural year of the NCAA tournament, the NIT was generally considered to be superior. During the 1940s, the relative status of the two tournaments was unclear, and thus some years produced disputed national championship claims. Some contemporary sources claim superiority for the NIT during this time. In 1943, in a shrewd competitive move the NCAA tournament began sharing Madison Square Garden with the NIT. In 1945, following victories by the NCAA champions over the NIT champions in the Red Cross games, The New York Times indicated that many teams who could potentially get bids to enter either tournament would probably choose the NCAA tournament "because it involves stronger competition." In 1950, City College of New York won both the NIT and the NCAA tournaments in the same season, coincidentally defeating Bradley University in the championship game of both tournaments and thereby united the titles.

In the 1952 Olympic Trials held immediately after the tournaments, NCAA champion Kansas defeated NAIA champion Southwest Missouri State in the collegiate semi-finals and then NIT champion La Salle in the collegiate final. Kansas lost to the AAU champion Peoria Caterpillars in the overall final.

After the fall-out from the 1951 gambling and point-shaving scandals, the NCAA tournament pulled out of Madison Square Garden. With conference champions and the majority of the top-ranked teams participating in it, the NCAA tournament since then came to be regarded as the more important post-season tourney and the sole determiner of the national championship, although following the taint of the gambling scandals, the NIT was still considered a quality tournament for some time afterward. The NCAA built on the momentum of three consecutive Red Cross "mythical national championship" game victories over the NIT, eventually outmaneuvering the NIT by adeptly avoiding permanent damage from the 1951 gambling and point-shaving scandals and by adding more teams. As the NCAA tournament steadily gained prominence, it became the sole source of naming the national champion.

=== Schools that claim pre-NCAA tournament basketball championships ===
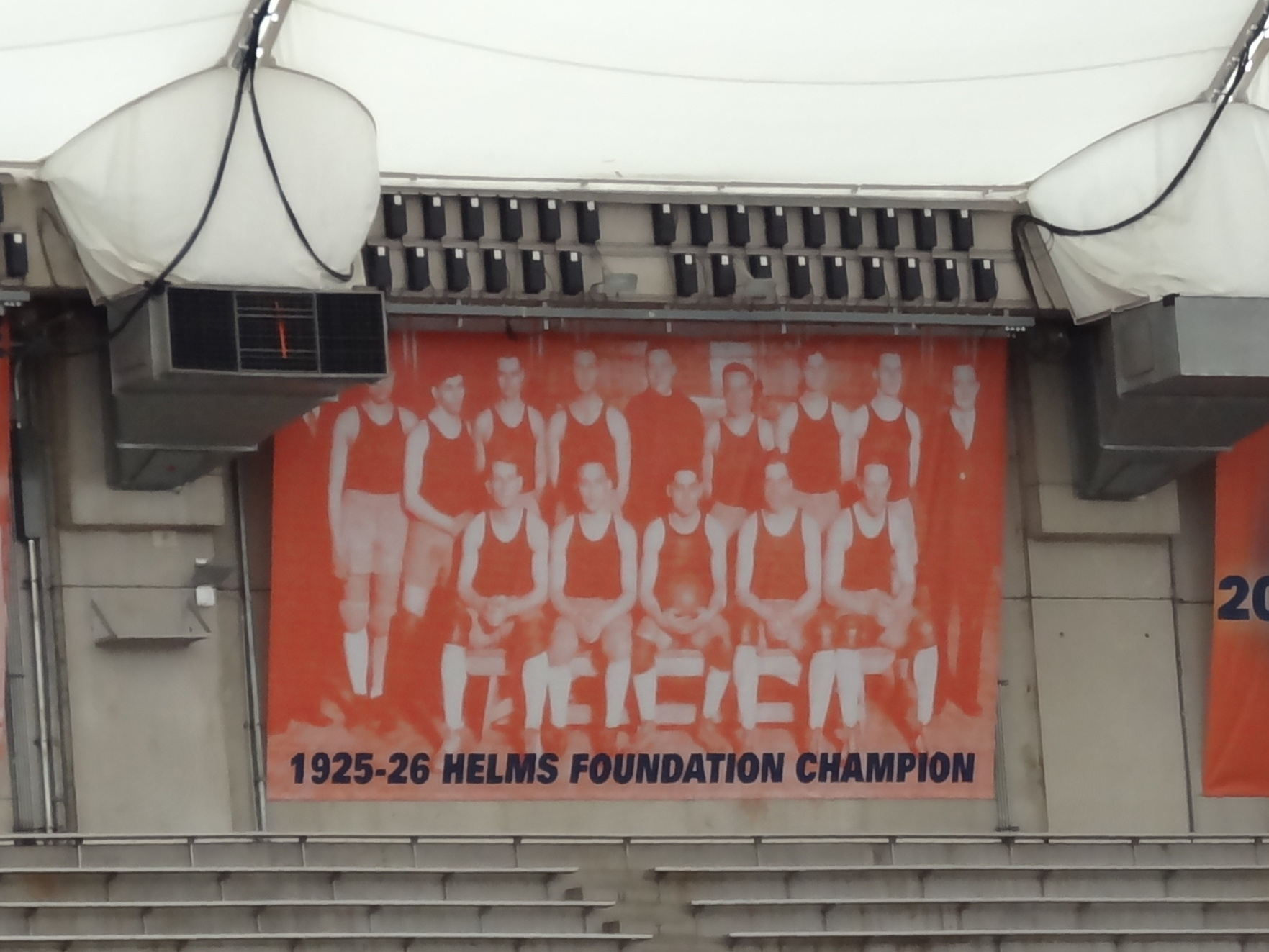
Banner proclaiming the 1926 Helms Athletic Foundation champion Syracuse Orangemen inside the Carrier Dome. This championship banner has since been removed, though the title is still claimed.

In some years college teams won playoff series or tournaments played on the court for a national championship, such as the annual AAU tournaments. In addition, many schools claim or recognize pre-tournament era national college basketball championships by virtue of being selected retrospectively by third-party selectors, such as Bill Schroeder at the Helms Athletic Foundation, including the Kansas, Purdue, Stanford, North Carolina, Pittsburgh, Wisconsin, Syracuse, and Washington State. LSU claims the 1935 championship by virtue of winning the American Legion Bowl game against Pittsburgh in a match-up of regional powers.

Multiple schools claim a national championship based on their NIT championships: Temple (1938), Long Island (in 1939 and 1941), West Virginia (1942), DePaul (1945), Utah (1947), San Francisco (1949), BYU (1951 and 1966), La Salle (1952), Seton Hall (1953), Holy Cross (1954), Duquesne (1955), Louisville (1956), Xavier (1958), Providence (1961 and 1963), and Southern Illinois (1967). Long Island (1939) and Kentucky (1933 and 1954) also recognize their selections as national champion by the Helms Foundation's Bill Schroeder during seasons that a different NCAA champion was crowned.

The following table is a partial list of schools that claim a national championship from the pre-NCAA tournament era of college basketball. See also Helms Athletic Foundation basketball national titles. Not all schools recognize national championship honors bestowed by third-party selectors, although almost every school with a team named as a Helms national champion claims the title for the selected seasons.

Tournament/playoff winners

Year (pre-1939)	School	Competition
1904	Hiram	1904 Olympic Games college championship tournament
1908	Chicago	Intercollegiate national championship
1916	Utah	AAU tournament
1920	New York University; Pennsylvania	AAU tournament National Championship Playoff
1922	Wabash	First National Collegiate Championship Tournament
1924	Butler	AAU tournament
1925	Washburn	AAU tournament
1935	LSU	American Legion Bowl Game
1937	Central Missouri	National Inter-collegiate Basketball Tournament (NAIA)
1938	Temple; Central Missouri	NIT; National Inter-collegiate Basketball Tournament (NAIA)

Non-tournament selections

Year (pre-1939)	School	Source
1901	Yale	Helms Athletic Foundation
1902	Minnesota	Helms Athletic Foundation
1903	Yale	Helms Athletic Foundation
1911	St. John's	Helms Athletic Foundation
1912	Wisconsin	Helms Athletic Foundation
1913	Navy	Helms Athletic Foundation
1914	Wisconsin	Helms Athletic Foundation
1915	Illinois	Helms Athletic Foundation
1916	Wisconsin	Helms Athletic Foundation
1917	Washington State	Helms Athletic Foundation
1918	Syracuse	Helms Athletic Foundation
1919	Minnesota	Helms Athletic Foundation
1920	Pennsylvania	Helms Athletic Foundation, Premo-Porretta
1921	Pennsylvania	Helms Athletic Foundation
1922	Kansas	Helms Athletic Foundation
1923	Kansas	Helms Athletic Foundation
1924	North Carolina	Helms Athletic Foundation
1925	Princeton	Helms Athletic Foundation
1926	Syracuse	Helms Athletic Foundation
1927	Notre Dame	Helms Athletic Foundation
1928	Pittsburgh	Helms Athletic Foundation, Veteran Athletes of Philadelphia
1929	Butler; Montana State	Veteran Athletes of Philadelphia; Helms Athletic Foundation
1930	Pittsburgh	Helms Athletic Foundation
1931	Northwestern	Helms Athletic Foundation
1932	Purdue	Helms Athletic Foundation
1933	Kentucky	Helms Athletic Foundation
1934	Wyoming	Helms Athletic Foundation
1935	New York University	Helms Athletic Foundation
1936	Notre Dame	Helms Athletic Foundation
1937	Stanford	Helms Athletic Foundation
1938	Temple	Helms Athletic Foundation

== Historically black colleges and universities ==
=== Black national basketball championships ===
In 1941, Southern University, coached by the famed football coach Ace Mumford, defeated North Carolina Central, 48–42, in the National Invitational Intercollegiate Basketball Tournament; this tournament was held because the NIT would not invite HBCUs at the time. NCCU was still designated national champions by the Associated Negro Press that year. There would be several other attempts at creating HBCU national tournaments in the 1940s. In late 1947, National Championships, Inc. announced that they would begin hosting a postseason football bowl game and basketball tournament for HBCUs; the basketball tournament does not appear to have been held. Jet magazine began sponsoring HBCU basketball polls in 1974. Dr. Cavil's Classic Cuts names champions for a "Major Division" (NCAA Division I) and a "Mid-Major Division" (NCAA Division II, NAIA Division I, and NAIA Division II).

The following table contains a list of men's black national champions.

==== Yearly national championship selections (men) ====
Year	School	Source
1941	Southern	National Invitational Intercollegiate Basketball Tournament (def. North Carolina Central, 48–42)
1941	North Carolina Central	Associated Negro Press
1942–1943	(no champions selected)	
1944	Lincoln (PA)	Negro National Championship game (def. North Carolina Central, 57–52)
1945	(no champion selected)	
1946	Langston	Unspecified "national tournament" championship game, which may have actually been an early-era SWAC basketball tournament; (def. Southern)
1947–1949	(no champions selected)	
1950	North Carolina Central	CIAA Men's Basketball Tournament champions
1951–1973	(no champions selected)	
1974	Maryland Eastern Shore	Jet
1975	Kentucky State	Jet
1976	Alcorn State	Jet
1977	Kentucky State	Jet
1978	Winston–Salem State	Jet
1979	(no champion selected)	
1980	Alcorn State	Jet
1981	Savannah State	Jet
1982	Xavier (LA)	Jet
1983	UDC	Jet
1984	Norfolk State	Jet
1985	Virginia Union	Jet
1986	Cheyney	Jet
1987	Norfolk State	Jet
1995	Texas Southern	American Sports Wire
1996	South Carolina State	American Sports Wire
1998	South Carolina State	American Sports Wire
2000	South Carolina State	American Sports Wire
2009	Morgan State (Major Division); Claflin (Mid-Major Division)	Dr. Cavil's Classic Cuts
2010	Morgan State (Major Division) (unavailable) (Mid-Major Division)	Dr. Cavil's Classic Cuts
2011	(unavailable)	
2012	Norfolk State	Black College Sports Page
2012	Norfolk State (Major Division); Shaw (Mid-Major Division)	Dr. Cavil's Classic Cuts
2013	Benedict College	Black College Sports Page
2013	Southern (Major Division); Benedict College (Mid-Major Division)	Dr. Cavil's Classic Cuts
2014	North Carolina Central	Black College Sports Page
2014	North Carolina Central (Major Division); Wiley College (Mid-Major Division)	Dr. Cavil's Classic Cuts
2015	Texas Southern (NCAA Division I); Livingstone College (NCAA Division II)	Black College Sports Page
2015	Texas Southern (Major Division); Talladega College (Mid-Major Division)	Dr. Cavil's Classic Cuts
2016	Hampton (NCAA Division I); Virginia State (NCAA Division II)	Black College Sports Page
2017	North Carolina Central (NCAA Division I); Clark Atlanta (NCAA Division II)	Black College Sports Page
2018	Texas Southern (NCAA Division I); Claflin (NCAA Division II)	Black College Sports Page
2019	Prairie View A&M (NCAA Division I); Virginia State (NCAA Division II)	Black College Sports Page

==== National championships by school (men) ====
School	National championships	Seasons
Norfolk State	3	1984, 1987, 2012
North Carolina Central	3	1941, 2014, 2017
South Carolina State	3	1996, 1998, 2000
Texas Southern	3	1995, 2015, 2018
Alcorn State	2	1976, 1980
Claflin	2	2009, 2018
Kentucky State	2	1975, 1977
Morgan State	2	2009, 2010
Southern	2	1941, 2013
Virginia State	2	2016, 2019
Benedict College	1	2013
Cheyney	1	1986
Clark Atlanta	1	2017
Hampton	1	2016
Langston	1	1946
Lincoln (PA)	1	1944
Livingstone College	1	2015
Maryland Eastern Shore	1	1974
Prairie View A&M	1	2019
Savannah State	1	1981
Shaw	1	2012
Talladega College	1	2015
UDC	1	1983
Virginia Union	1	1985
Wiley College	1	2014
Winston–Salem State	1	1978
Xavier (LA)	1	1982

The following table contains a list of women's black national champions.

==== Yearly national championship selections (women) ====
Year	School	Source
1978	South Carolina State	Jet
1979–1981	(no champions selected)	
1982	Claflin	Jet
1983	Norfolk State	Jet
1984	Dillard	Jet
1985	Hampton	Jet
1986	Alabama A&M	Jet
1987	Albany State	Jet
2007	Coppin State; North Carolina Central	Black College Sports Page
2008	(unavailable)	
2009	North Carolina A&T (Major Division); Langston (Mid-Major Division)	Dr. Cavil's Classic Cuts
2010	North Carolina A&T (Major Division) (unavailable) (Mid-Major Division)	Dr. Cavil's Classic Cuts
2011	(unavailable)	
2012	Shaw	Black College Sports Page
2012	(unavailable) (Major Division); Shaw (Mid-Major Division)	Dr. Cavil's Classic Cuts
2013	Hampton	Black College Sports Page
2013	Hampton (Major Division); Wiley College (Mid-Major Division)	Dr. Cavil's Classic Cuts
2014	Hampton	Black College Sports Page
2014	Hampton (Major Division); Wiley College (Mid-Major Division)	Dr. Cavil's Classic Cuts
2015	Savannah State (NCAA Division I); UDC (NCAA Division II)	Black College Sports Page
2015	Texas Southern (Major Division); UDC (Mid-Major Division)	Dr. Cavil's Classic Cuts
2016	North Carolina A&T (NCAA Division I); Virginia Union (NCAA Division II)	Black College Sports Page
2017	Texas Southern (NCAA Division I); Virginia Union (NCAA Division II)	Black College Sports Page
2018	North Carolina A&T (NCAA Division I); Virginia Union (NCAA Division II)	Black College Sports Page
2019	Southern (NCAA Division I); Virginia Union (NCAA Division II)	Black College Sports Page

==== National championships by school (women) ====
School	National championships	Seasons
North Carolina A&T	4	2009, 2010, 2016, 2018
Virginia Union	4	2016, 2017, 2018, 2019
Hampton	3	1985, 2013, 2014
Texas Southern	2	2015, 2017
Wiley College	2	2013, 2014
Alabama A&M	1	1986
Albany State	1	1987
Claflin	1	1982
Coppin State	1	2007
Dillard	1	1984
Langston	1	2009
Norfolk State	1	1983
North Carolina Central	1	2007
Savannah State	1	2015
Shaw	1	2012
South Carolina State	1	1978
Southern	1	2019
UDC	1	2015

=== Black national baseball championships ===
HBCUs first had a mythical black national champion named in 2002, by blackcollegebaseball.com. More recently, a black national champion has been named since 2015, by blackcollegenines.com. The latter names champions for a "Large School Division" (NCAA Division I) and a "Small School Division" (NCAA Division II, NCAA Division III, and the NAIA).

==== Yearly national championship selections ====
Year	School	Source
2002	Bethune–Cookman	blackcollegebaseball.com
2003	Southern	blackcollegebaseball.com
2004	Bethune–Cookman	blackcollegebaseball.com
2005	North Carolina A&T; Southern	blackcollegebaseball.com
2006	Prairie View A&M	blackcollegebaseball.com
2007	Bethune–Cookman	blackcollegebaseball.com
2008	Bethune–Cookman	blackcollegebaseball.com
2009	Bethune–Cookman	blackcollegebaseball.com
2010	Bethune–Cookman (NCAA Division I); West Virginia State (NCAA Division II & NAIA)	blackcollegebaseball.com
2011	Bethune–Cookman (NCAA Division I); Edward Waters College (NCAA Division II & NAIA)	blackcollegebaseball.com
2012	(unavailable) (NCAA Division I) * (unavailable) (NCAA Division II & NAIA) *	blackcollegebaseball.com
2013–2014	(no champions selected)	
2015	Alabama State (Large School Division); Winston–Salem State (Small School Division)	blackcollegenines.com
2016	Alabama State (Large School Division); West Virginia State (Small School Division)	blackcollegenines.com
2017	Bethune–Cookman (Large School Division); Winston–Salem State (Small School Division)	blackcollegenines.com
2018	North Carolina A&T (Large School Division); Albany State (Small School Division)	blackcollegenines.com
2019	Southern (Large School Division); Winston–Salem State (Small School Division)	blackcollegenines.com

Note: *Alcorn State, St. Augustine's, and Stillman College are listed by a source as having been named black national champions by blackcollegebaseball.com, but the year(s) of the championships is not specified by the source; the year could be 2012, since champions were reportedly named that year

==== National championships by school ====
School	National championships	Seasons
Bethune–Cookman	8	2002, 2004, 2007, 2008, 2009, 2010, 2011, 2017
Southern	3	2003, 2005, 2019
Winston–Salem State	3	2015, 2017, 2019
Alabama State	2	2015, 2016
North Carolina A&T	2	2005, 2018
West Virginia State	2	2010, 2016
Albany State	1	2018
Edward Waters College	1	2011
Prairie View A&M	1	2006

== High school sports ==
Because high school sports in the United States such as football and basketball are state-centered sports involving thousands of schools, it would be almost impossible to have a national championship playoff. A single-game playoff for football, however, was attempted in 1938 and 1939, it was particularly difficult at that time due to many states' prohibition of postseason games. Nearly all states crown several champions in different classifications, which are not uniform from state to state, based upon school enrollments.

Some publications and internet sites release nationwide rankings for high school sports based on polls or mathematical formulas which take into account various factors like average margin of victory and strength of schedule. Schools that finish atop these rankings, particularly the USA Today poll, often claim to be national champions, and the press calls them "mythical national champions".

== National Football League ==
In the earliest days of the National Football League, the NFL championship was determined by a formula and by the votes of the NFL owners. In three instances, 1920, 1921 and 1925, this led to disputed titles. In 1932, two teams tied atop the standings led to a one-game playoff for the championship, which was made permanent the next year. There has been some sort of NFL playoff ever since, and as the league grew, so too did the tournament, which eventually took form as the 14–team single-elimination tournament it is today.
