= 1908 Rhode Island State football team =

American college football season

1908 Rhode Island State football
- Conference: Independent
- Record: 4–2
- Head coach: Marshall Tyler (10th season)

1908 Eastern college football independents records
| | Conf. | | | Overall |
| Team | W | L | T | W | | L | | T |
|---|---|---|---|---|---|---|---|---|
| Penn | | – | | 11 | – | 0 | – | 1 |
| Harvard | | – | | 9 | – | 0 | – | 1 |
| Cornell | | – | | 7 | – | 1 | – | 1 |
| Fordham | | – | | 5 | – | 1 | – | 0 |
| Yale | | – | | 7 | – | 1 | – | 1 |
| Dartmouth | | – | | 6 | – | 1 | – | 1 |
| Carlisle | | – | | 10 | – | 2 | – | 1 |
| Washington & Jefferson | | – | | 10 | – | 2 | – | 1 |
| Army | | – | | 6 | – | 1 | – | 2 |
| Pittsburgh | | – | | 8 | – | 3 | – | 0 |
| Lafayette | | – | | 6 | – | 2 | – | 2 |
| Princeton | | – | | 5 | – | 2 | – | 3 |
| Syracuse | | – | | 6 | – | 3 | – | 1 |
| Brown | | – | | 5 | – | 3 | – | 1 |
| Temple | | – | | 3 | – | 2 | – | 1 |
| Colgate | | – | | 4 | – | 3 | – | 0 |
| Lehigh | | – | | 4 | – | 3 | – | 0 |
| Dickinson | | – | | 5 | – | 4 | – | 0 |
| Amherst | | – | | 3 | – | 3 | – | 2 |
| Holy Cross | | – | | 4 | – | 4 | – | 0 |
| Penn State | | – | | 5 | – | 5 | – | 0 |
| Vermont | | – | | 3 | – | 3 | – | 3 |
| Wesleyan | | – | | 3 | – | 4 | – | 2 |
| Springfield Training School | | – | | 3 | – | 4 | – | 1 |
| NYU | | – | | 2 | – | 3 | – | 2 |
| Franklin & Marshall | | – | | 4 | – | 6 | – | 1 |
| Bucknell | | – | | 3 | – | 5 | – | 2 |
| Rutgers | | – | | 3 | – | 5 | – | 1 |
| Boston College | | – | | 2 | – | 4 | – | 2 |
| Carnegie Tech | | – | | 3 | – | 7 | – | 0 |
| Geneva | | – | | 1 | – | 6 | – | 2 |
| Tufts | | – | | 1 | – | 6 | – | 1 |
| Villanova | | – | | 1 | – | 6 | – | 0 |
| New Hampshire | | – | | 1 | – | 7 | – | 0 |
| Drexel | | – | | 0 | – | 7 | – | 0 |

The 1908 Rhode Island State football team was an American football team that represented Rhode Island State College (later renamed the University of Rhode Island) as an independent during the 1908 college football season. In its tenth and final year under head coach Marshall Tyler, the team compiled a 4–2 record.

== Schedule ==
| Date | Opponent | Site | Result | Source |
|---|---|---|---|---|
| September 25 | at Massachusetts | Alumni Field; Amherst, MA | L 0–2 | |
| October 10 | Worcester Tech | Kingston, RI | L 0–4 | |
| October 17 | St. Andrew's School | Kingston, RI | W 21–0 | |
| October 24 | Bryant & Stratton | Kingston, RI | W 6–0 | |
| November 14 | New Hampshire | Kingston, RI | W 12–0 | |
| November 21 | at Connecticut | Athletic Fields; Storrs, CT (rivalry) | W 12–0 | |
