= 1908 New Hampshire football team =

American college football season

1908 New Hampshire football
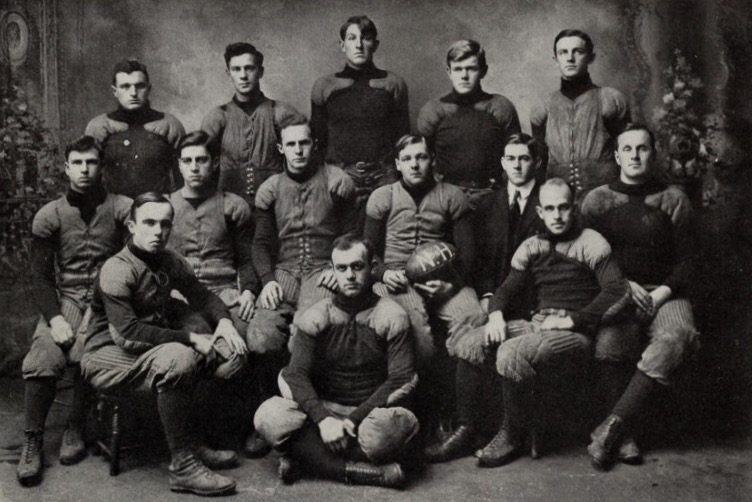
- Team captain Sanborn is at right-center of the middle row, holding football
- Conference: Independent
- Record: 1–7
- Head coach: Charles O. Gill (1st season)
- Captain: Carroll B. Wilkins (1st game) (Note: Wilkins was initially elected captain but became ineligible prior to the Bowdoin game; Sanborn was then elected captain.); Edson D. Sanborn (other games)
- Home stadium: College grounds, Durham, NH

1908 Eastern college football independents records
	Conf.			Overall
Team	W	L	T	W		L		T
Penn		–		11	–	0	–	1
Harvard		–		9	–	0	–	1
Cornell		–		7	–	1	–	1
Fordham		–		5	–	1	–	0
Yale		–		7	–	1	–	1
Dartmouth		–		6	–	1	–	1
Carlisle		–		10	–	2	–	1
Washington & Jefferson		–		10	–	2	–	1
Army		–		6	–	1	–	2
Pittsburgh		–		8	–	3	–	0
Lafayette		–		6	–	2	–	2
Princeton		–		5	–	2	–	3
Syracuse		–		6	–	3	–	1
Brown		–		5	–	3	–	1
Temple		–		3	–	2	–	1
Colgate		–		4	–	3	–	0
Lehigh		–		4	–	3	–	0
Dickinson		–		5	–	4	–	0
Amherst		–		3	–	3	–	2
Holy Cross		–		4	–	4	–	0
Penn State		–		5	–	5	–	0
Vermont		–		3	–	3	–	3
Wesleyan		–		3	–	4	–	2
Springfield Training School		–		3	–	4	–	1
NYU		–		2	–	3	–	2
Franklin & Marshall		–		4	–	6	–	1
Bucknell		–		3	–	5	–	2
Rutgers		–		3	–	5	–	1
Boston College		–		2	–	4	–	2
Carnegie Tech		–		3	–	7	–	0
Geneva		–		1	–	6	–	2
Tufts		–		1	–	6	–	1
Villanova		–		1	–	6	–	0
New Hampshire		–		1	–	7	–	0
Drexel		–		0	–	7	–	0

The 1908 New Hampshire football team (Note: The school did not adopt the Wildcats nickname until February 1926; before then, they were generally referred to as "the blue and white".) was an American football team that represented New Hampshire College of Agriculture and the Mechanic Arts (Note: The school was often referred to as New Hampshire College or New Hampshire State College in newspapers of the era.) during the 1908 college football season—the school became the University of New Hampshire in 1923. Under first-year head coach Charles O. Gill, the team finished with a record of 1–7.

== Schedule ==
Scoring during this era awarded five points for a touchdown, one point for a conversion kick (extra point), and four points for a field goal. Teams played in the one-platoon system, and games were played in two halves rather than four quarters.

Date	Opponent	Site	Result	Attendance	Source
September 26	at Brown	Andrews Field; Providence, RI	L 0–34		
October 3	Bowdoin	Durham, NH	L 0–15		
October 10	at Colby	Portland, ME	L 0–6		
October 17	at Maine	Orono, ME (rivalry)	L 4–6		
October 24	at Bates	Lewiston, ME	L 0–11		
October 31	Boston College	Durham, NH	W 18–0		
November 7	Massachusetts	Manchester, NH (rivalry)	L 9–13	1,500+	
November 14	at Rhode Island State	Kingston, RI	L 0–12		

== Team ==
Player	Class	Position
J. Mortimer Leonard	1910	Left end
Roland B. Hammond	1909	Left tackle
James B. Pettingill	1912	Left tackle
Howard W. Sanborn	1910 (2-year)	Left guard
Benjamin F. Proud	1911	Center
Bernard A. Lougee	1909	Center
Ralph C. Morgan	1912	Right guard
Charles S. Richardson	1909	Right tackle
Harold C. Read	1910	Right end
Frank P. Kennedy	1911	Quarterback
Clarence M. Lowd	1912	Left halfback
Edson D. Sanborn (Note: Sanborn later coached the non-varsity 1918 New Hampshire football team during World War I.)	1909	Fullback
Albert Peaslee	1909	Right halfback

Each of the above players was awarded a varsity letter.

Manager: Lee L. Smalley, 1909

Asst. Manager: Brenton W. Proud, 1910

Carroll B. Wilkins and team manager Smalley were also listed as earning varsity letters.
