= 1908 Boston College football team =

American college football season

1908 Boston College football
- Conference: Independent
- Record: 2–4–2
- Head coach: Joe Kenney & Joe Reilly (1st season)
- Captain: George Pearce

1908 Eastern college football independents records
	Conf.			Overall
Team	W	L	T	W		L		T
Penn		–		11	–	0	–	1
Harvard		–		9	–	0	–	1
Cornell		–		7	–	1	–	1
Fordham		–		5	–	1	–	0
Yale		–		7	–	1	–	1
Dartmouth		–		6	–	1	–	1
Carlisle		–		10	–	2	–	1
Washington & Jefferson		–		10	–	2	–	1
Army		–		6	–	1	–	2
Pittsburgh		–		8	–	3	–	0
Lafayette		–		6	–	2	–	2
Princeton		–		5	–	2	–	3
Syracuse		–		6	–	3	–	1
Brown		–		5	–	3	–	1
Temple		–		3	–	2	–	1
Colgate		–		4	–	3	–	0
Lehigh		–		4	–	3	–	0
Dickinson		–		5	–	4	–	0
Amherst		–		3	–	3	–	2
Holy Cross		–		4	–	4	–	0
Penn State		–		5	–	5	–	0
Vermont		–		3	–	3	–	3
Wesleyan		–		3	–	4	–	2
Springfield Training School		–		3	–	4	–	1
NYU		–		2	–	3	–	2
Franklin & Marshall		–		4	–	6	–	1
Bucknell		–		3	–	5	–	2
Rutgers		–		3	–	5	–	1
Boston College		–		2	–	4	–	2
Carnegie Tech		–		3	–	7	–	0
Geneva		–		1	–	6	–	2
Tufts		–		1	–	6	–	1
Villanova		–		1	–	6	–	0
New Hampshire		–		1	–	7	–	0
Drexel		–		0	–	7	–	0

The 1908 Boston College football team was an American football team that represented Boston College as an independent during the 1908 college football season. Led by Joe Kenney and Joe Reilly in their first and only season as co-head coaches, Boston College compiled a record of 2–4–2.

== Schedule ==
Date	Opponent	Site	Result	Source
October 10	at Bridgewater Normal	Bridgewater, MA	L 10–12	
October 17	at Saint Anselm	Manchester, NH	T 0–0	
October 24	at Dean Academy	Franklin, MA	L 0–18	
October 31	at New Hampshire	Durham, NH	L 0–18	
November 7	at Connecticut	Athletic Fields; Storrs, CT	T 0–0	
November 11	Massachusetts College of Osteopathy	Locust Street Grounds; Boston, MA	W 9–0	
November 14	at Saint Anselm	Manchester, NH	W 11–0	
November 26	vs. Alumni	Huntington Avenue Grounds; Boston, MA	L 0–6	
