= 1908 Geneva Covenanters football team =

American college football season

1908 Geneva Covenanters football
- Conference: Independent
- Record: 1–6–2
- Head coach: Arthur McKean (2nd season)

1908 Eastern college football independents records
	Conf.			Overall
Team	W	L	T	W		L		T
Penn		–		11	–	0	–	1
Harvard		–		9	–	0	–	1
Cornell		–		7	–	1	–	1
Fordham		–		5	–	1	–	0
Yale		–		7	–	1	–	1
Dartmouth		–		6	–	1	–	1
Carlisle		–		10	–	2	–	1
Washington & Jefferson		–		10	–	2	–	1
Army		–		6	–	1	–	2
Pittsburgh		–		8	–	3	–	0
Lafayette		–		6	–	2	–	2
Princeton		–		5	–	2	–	3
Syracuse		–		6	–	3	–	1
Brown		–		5	–	3	–	1
Temple		–		3	–	2	–	1
Colgate		–		4	–	3	–	0
Lehigh		–		4	–	3	–	0
Dickinson		–		5	–	4	–	0
Amherst		–		3	–	3	–	2
Holy Cross		–		4	–	4	–	0
Penn State		–		5	–	5	–	0
Vermont		–		3	–	3	–	3
Wesleyan		–		3	–	4	–	2
Springfield Training School		–		3	–	4	–	1
NYU		–		2	–	3	–	2
Franklin & Marshall		–		4	–	6	–	1
Bucknell		–		3	–	5	–	2
Rutgers		–		3	–	5	–	1
Boston College		–		2	–	4	–	2
Carnegie Tech		–		3	–	7	–	0
Geneva		–		1	–	6	–	2
Tufts		–		1	–	6	–	1
Villanova		–		1	–	6	–	0
New Hampshire		–		1	–	7	–	0
Drexel		–		0	–	7	–	0

The 1908 Geneva Covenanters football team was an American football team that represented Geneva College as an independent during the 1908 college football season. Led by second-year head coach, Arthur McKean, the team compiled a record of 1–6–2.

== Schedule ==
Date	Opponent	Site	Result	Source
October 3	Allegheny	Beaver Falls, PA	T 0–5	
October 7	at Washington & Jefferson	College Park; Washington, PA	L 0–29	
October 10	at Waynesburg	Waynesburg, PA	L 0–5	
October 17	at Penn State	Beaver Field; State College, PA	L 0–51	
October 24	Westminster (PA)	Beaver Falls, PA	L 0–15	
October 31	at Grove City	Grove City, PA	T 5–5	
November 7	at Westminster (PA)	New Wilmington, PA	L 0–39	
November 14	Slippery Rock	Beaver Falls, PA	L 6–18	
November 21	Grove City	Beaver Falls, PA	W 5–0	
