= 1908 Army Cadets football team =

American college football season

1908 Army Cadets football
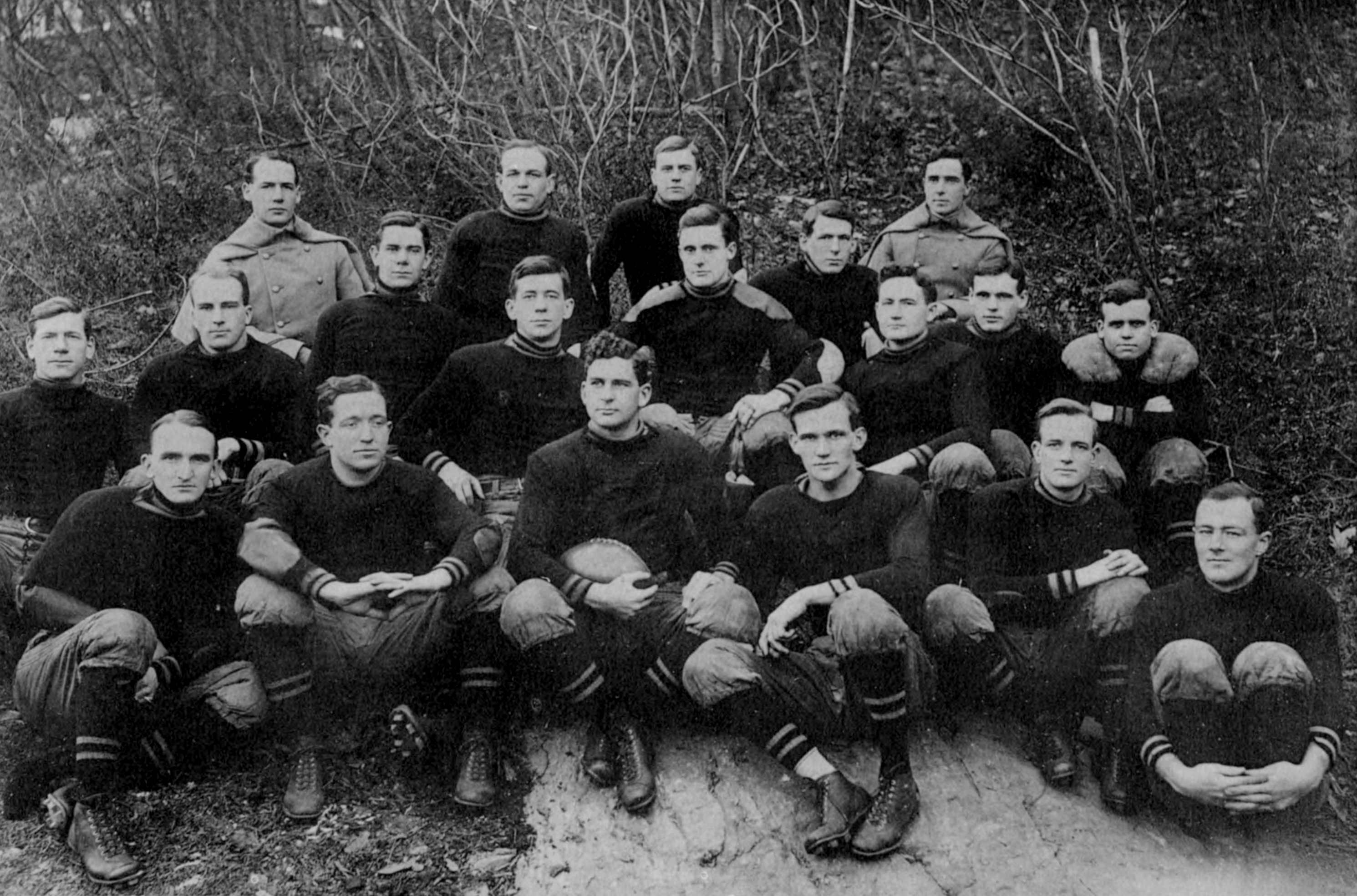
- Conference: Independent
- Record: 6–1–2
- Head coach: Harry Nelly (1st season)
- Captain: Wallace Philoon
- Home stadium: The Plain

1908 Eastern college football independents records
	Conf.			Overall
Team	W	L	T	W		L		T
Penn		–		11	–	0	–	1
Harvard		–		9	–	0	–	1
Cornell		–		7	–	1	–	1
Fordham		–		5	–	1	–	0
Yale		–		7	–	1	–	1
Dartmouth		–		6	–	1	–	1
Carlisle		–		10	–	2	–	1
Washington & Jefferson		–		10	–	2	–	1
Army		–		6	–	1	–	2
Pittsburgh		–		8	–	3	–	0
Lafayette		–		6	–	2	–	2
Princeton		–		5	–	2	–	3
Syracuse		–		6	–	3	–	1
Brown		–		5	–	3	–	1
Temple		–		3	–	2	–	1
Colgate		–		4	–	3	–	0
Lehigh		–		4	–	3	–	0
Dickinson		–		5	–	4	–	0
Amherst		–		3	–	3	–	2
Holy Cross		–		4	–	4	–	0
Penn State		–		5	–	5	–	0
Vermont		–		3	–	3	–	3
Wesleyan		–		3	–	4	–	2
Springfield Training School		–		3	–	4	–	1
NYU		–		2	–	3	–	2
Franklin & Marshall		–		4	–	6	–	1
Bucknell		–		3	–	5	–	2
Rutgers		–		3	–	5	–	1
Boston College		–		2	–	4	–	2
Carnegie Tech		–		3	–	7	–	0
Geneva		–		1	–	6	–	2
Tufts		–		1	–	6	–	1
Villanova		–		1	–	6	–	0
New Hampshire		–		1	–	7	–	0
Drexel		–		0	–	7	–	0

The 1908 Army Cadets football team represented the United States Military Academy as an independent during the 1908 college football season. In their first season under head coach Harry Nelly, the Cadets compiled a 6–1–2 record, shut out five of their nine opponents (including a scoreless tie with Princeton), and outscored all opponents by a combined total of 87 to 21. The team's only loss was to Yale. In the annual Army–Navy Game, the Cadets defeated the Midshipmen 6–4.

Two Army players were honored by Walter Camp (WC) on his All-America team. They are center Wallace Philoon (second team) and end Johnson (third team). Philoon also received first-team honors from the Washington Herald, Chicago Inter Ocean, and Fred Crolius. In addition, tackle Daniel Pullen was selected as a first-team All-American by the New York World, Fielding H. Yost, T. A. Dwight Jones, and the Kansas City Journal.

== Schedule ==
Date	Opponent	Site	Result	Source
October 3	Tufts	The Plain; West Point, NY	W 5–0	
October 10	Trinity (CT)	The Plain; West Point, NY	W 33–0	
October 17	Yale	The Plain; West Point, NY	L 0–6	
October 24	Colgate	The Plain; West Point, NY	W 6–0	
October 31	Princeton	The Plain; West Point, NY	T 0–0	
November 7	Springfield Training School	The Plain; West Point, NY	W 6–5	
November 14	Washington & Jefferson	The Plain; West Point, NY	T 6–6	
November 21	Villanova	The Plain; West Point, NY	W 25–0	
November 28	vs. Navy	Franklin Field; Philadelphia, PA (Army–Navy Game)	W 6–4	
