= 1908 Vermont Green and Gold football team =

American college football season

1908 Vermont Green and Gold football
- Conference: Independent
- Record: 3–3–3
- Head coach: Edward Herr (1st season)
- Home stadium: Centennial Field

1908 Eastern college football independents records
	Conf.			Overall
Team	W	L	T	W		L		T
Penn		–		11	–	0	–	1
Harvard		–		9	–	0	–	1
Cornell		–		7	–	1	–	1
Fordham		–		5	–	1	–	0
Yale		–		7	–	1	–	1
Dartmouth		–		6	–	1	–	1
Carlisle		–		10	–	2	–	1
Washington & Jefferson		–		10	–	2	–	1
Army		–		6	–	1	–	2
Pittsburgh		–		8	–	3	–	0
Lafayette		–		6	–	2	–	2
Princeton		–		5	–	2	–	3
Syracuse		–		6	–	3	–	1
Brown		–		5	–	3	–	1
Temple		–		3	–	2	–	1
Colgate		–		4	–	3	–	0
Lehigh		–		4	–	3	–	0
Dickinson		–		5	–	4	–	0
Amherst		–		3	–	3	–	2
Holy Cross		–		4	–	4	–	0
Penn State		–		5	–	5	–	0
Vermont		–		3	–	3	–	3
Wesleyan		–		3	–	4	–	2
Springfield Training School		–		3	–	4	–	1
NYU		–		2	–	3	–	2
Franklin & Marshall		–		4	–	6	–	1
Bucknell		–		3	–	5	–	2
Rutgers		–		3	–	5	–	1
Boston College		–		2	–	4	–	2
Carnegie Tech		–		3	–	7	–	0
Geneva		–		1	–	6	–	2
Tufts		–		1	–	6	–	1
Villanova		–		1	–	6	–	0
New Hampshire		–		1	–	7	–	0
Drexel		–		0	–	7	–	0

The 1908 Vermont Green and Gold football team was an American football team that represented the University of Vermont as an independent during the 1908 college football season. In their only year under head coach Edward Herr, the team compiled a 3–3–3 record.

== Schedule ==
Date	Opponent	Site	Result	Attendance	Source
September 30	at Dartmouth	Alumni Oval; Hanover, NH	L 0–11		
October 3	Holy Cross	Centennial Field; Burlington, VT	W 5–0	1,500	
October 10	at Amherst	Pratt Field; Amherst, MA	T 0–0		
October 14	Massachusetts	Centennial Field; Burlington, VT	T 6–6		
October 17	Norwich	Centennial Field; Burlington, VT	W 11–0		
October 24	at Cornell	Percy Field; Ithaca, NY	L 0–9		
October 28	Norwich	Intercity Park; Montpelier, VT	W 11–6		
November 7	at Williams	Weston Field; Williamstown, MA	T 0–0		
November 14	at Brown	Andrews Field; Providence, RI	L 0–12		
