= 1908 Bucknell football team =

American college football season

1908 Bucknell football
- Conference: Independent
- Record: 3–5–2
- Head coach: Paul G. Smith (1st season)
- Captain: Charles O’Brien

1908 Eastern college football independents records
	Conf.			Overall
Team	W	L	T	W		L		T
Penn		–		11	–	0	–	1
Harvard		–		9	–	0	–	1
Cornell		–		7	–	1	–	1
Fordham		–		5	–	1	–	0
Yale		–		7	–	1	–	1
Dartmouth		–		6	–	1	–	1
Carlisle		–		10	–	2	–	1
Washington & Jefferson		–		10	–	2	–	1
Army		–		6	–	1	–	2
Pittsburgh		–		8	–	3	–	0
Lafayette		–		6	–	2	–	2
Princeton		–		5	–	2	–	3
Syracuse		–		6	–	3	–	1
Brown		–		5	–	3	–	1
Temple		–		3	–	2	–	1
Colgate		–		4	–	3	–	0
Lehigh		–		4	–	3	–	0
Dickinson		–		5	–	4	–	0
Amherst		–		3	–	3	–	2
Holy Cross		–		4	–	4	–	0
Penn State		–		5	–	5	–	0
Vermont		–		3	–	3	–	3
Wesleyan		–		3	–	4	–	2
Springfield Training School		–		3	–	4	–	1
NYU		–		2	–	3	–	2
Franklin & Marshall		–		4	–	6	–	1
Bucknell		–		3	–	5	–	2
Rutgers		–		3	–	5	–	1
Boston College		–		2	–	4	–	2
Carnegie Tech		–		3	–	7	–	0
Geneva		–		1	–	6	–	2
Tufts		–		1	–	6	–	1
Villanova		–		1	–	6	–	0
New Hampshire		–		1	–	7	–	0
Drexel		–		0	–	7	–	0

The 1908 Bucknell football team was an American football team that represented Bucknell University as an independent during the 1908 college football season. Led by Paul G. Smith in his first and only season as head coach, the team compiled a 3–5–2 record.

== Schedule ==
Date	Time	Opponent	Site	Result	Attendance	Source
September 26		Susquehanna	Lewisburg, PA	W 33–0		
October 3		at Penn	Franklin Field; Philadelphia, PA	L 0–16		
October 10		Gettysburg	Lewisburg, PA	L 5–6		
October 17		Delaware	Lewisburg, PA	W 13–0		
October 24		at Pittsburgh	Exposition Park; Pittsburgh, PA	L 0–22	3,000	
October 31		at Lafayette	March Field Easton, PA	T 6–6		
November 7		at Penn State	Beaver Field State College, PA	L 6–33		
November 14		at Dickinson	Carlisle, PA	L 0–6		
November 21		Ursinus	Lewisburg, PA	W 17–11		
November 26		at George Washington	American League Park; Washington, DC	T 5–5		
