= 1908 Drexel Dragons football team =

American college football season

1908 Drexel Dragons football
- Conference: Independent
- Record: 0–7
- Head coach: None
- Captain: Schittler

1908 Eastern college football independents records
	Conf.			Overall
Team	W	L	T	W		L		T
Penn		–		11	–	0	–	1
Harvard		–		9	–	0	–	1
Cornell		–		7	–	1	–	1
Fordham		–		5	–	1	–	0
Yale		–		7	–	1	–	1
Dartmouth		–		6	–	1	–	1
Carlisle		–		10	–	2	–	1
Washington & Jefferson		–		10	–	2	–	1
Army		–		6	–	1	–	2
Pittsburgh		–		8	–	3	–	0
Lafayette		–		6	–	2	–	2
Princeton		–		5	–	2	–	3
Syracuse		–		6	–	3	–	1
Brown		–		5	–	3	–	1
Temple		–		3	–	2	–	1
Colgate		–		4	–	3	–	0
Lehigh		–		4	–	3	–	0
Dickinson		–		5	–	4	–	0
Amherst		–		3	–	3	–	2
Holy Cross		–		4	–	4	–	0
Penn State		–		5	–	5	–	0
Vermont		–		3	–	3	–	3
Wesleyan		–		3	–	4	–	2
Springfield Training School		–		3	–	4	–	1
NYU		–		2	–	3	–	2
Franklin & Marshall		–		4	–	6	–	1
Bucknell		–		3	–	5	–	2
Rutgers		–		3	–	5	–	1
Boston College		–		2	–	4	–	2
Carnegie Tech		–		3	–	7	–	0
Geneva		–		1	–	6	–	2
Tufts		–		1	–	6	–	1
Villanova		–		1	–	6	–	0
New Hampshire		–		1	–	7	–	0
Drexel		–		0	–	7	–	0

The 1908 Drexel Dragons football team did not have a head coach.

== Schedule ==
Date	Opponent	Site	Result	Source
October 7	at Pennington	Pennington, NJ	L 0–20	
October 21	at Villanova Prep	Villanova, PA	L 0–52	
October 24	at Pennsylvania Military	Pennsylvania Military College campus; Chester, PA	L 0–22	
November 2	Peddie School	Hightstown, NJ	L 0–67	
November 7	at Tome School	Port Deposit, MD	L 4–69	
November 14	at Williamson College of the Trades	Media, PA	L 0–44	
November 18	at Perkiomen School	Pennsburg, PA	L 5–27	
Unknown	Saint Joseph's		–	

== Roster ==
1908 Drexel Dragons football team roster
Players
Coaches
Offense

Pos.	#	Name	Class
TE		Schittler (C)
OT		Yetter
G		Turnbull
C		Hass
RG		Crossgrove
OT		Schmidt
TE		Bayne
QB		Haley
HB		Gifford
HB		Jones
FB		Vandemark

Defense

Pos.	#	Name	Class

Special teams

Pos.	#	Name	Class

Head coach

Coordinators/assistant coaches

Legend

- (C) Team captain
- (S) Suspended
- (I) Ineligible
- Injured
- Redshirt

Roster
Last update: 15 February 2018
