= 1908 Colgate football team =

American college football season

1908 Colgate football
- Conference: Independent
- Record: 4–3
- Head coach: Edwin Sweetland (1st season)
- Captain: Robert Whelan
- Home stadium: Whitnall Field

1908 Eastern college football independents records
	Conf.			Overall
Team	W	L	T	W		L		T
Penn		–		11	–	0	–	1
Harvard		–		9	–	0	–	1
Cornell		–		7	–	1	–	1
Fordham		–		5	–	1	–	0
Yale		–		7	–	1	–	1
Dartmouth		–		6	–	1	–	1
Carlisle		–		10	–	2	–	1
Washington & Jefferson		–		10	–	2	–	1
Army		–		6	–	1	–	2
Pittsburgh		–		8	–	3	–	0
Lafayette		–		6	–	2	–	2
Princeton		–		5	–	2	–	3
Syracuse		–		6	–	3	–	1
Brown		–		5	–	3	–	1
Temple		–		3	–	2	–	1
Colgate		–		4	–	3	–	0
Lehigh		–		4	–	3	–	0
Dickinson		–		5	–	4	–	0
Amherst		–		3	–	3	–	2
Holy Cross		–		4	–	4	–	0
Penn State		–		5	–	5	–	0
Vermont		–		3	–	3	–	3
Wesleyan		–		3	–	4	–	2
Springfield Training School		–		3	–	4	–	1
NYU		–		2	–	3	–	2
Frankin & Marshall		–		4	–	6	–	1
Bucknell		–		3	–	5	–	2
Rutgers		–		3	–	5	–	1
Boston College		–		2	–	4	–	2
Carnegie Tech		–		3	–	7	–	0
Geneva		–		1	–	6	–	2
Tufts		–		1	–	6	–	1
Villanova		–		1	–	6	–	0
New Hampshire		–		1	–	7	–	0
Drexel		–		0	–	7	–	0

The 1908 Colgate football team was an American football team that represented Colgate University as an independent during the 1908 college football season. In its first and only season under head coach Edwin Sweetland, the team compiled a 4–3 record. Robert Whelan was the team captain. The team played its home games on Whitnall Field in Hamilton, New York.

== Schedule ==
Date	Opponent	Site	Result	Attendance	Source
October 3	at Brown	Andrews Field; Providence, RI	L 0–6		
October 10	Hobart	Whitnall Field; Hamilton, NY	W 26–0		
October 17	at Cornell	Percy Field; Ithaca, NY (rivalry)	L 0–9		
October 24	at Army	The Plain; West Point, NY	L 0–6		
October 31	Union (NY)	Whitnall Field; Hamilton, NY	W 24–4		
November 7	at Syracuse	Archbold Stadium; Syracuse, NY	W 6–0		
November 14	at Hamilton	Clinton, NY	W 22–0		
