= 1908 Springfield Training School football team =

American college football season

1908 Springfield Training School football
- Conference: Independent
- Record: 3–4–1
- Head coach: James H. McCurdy (11th season)
- Captain: William N. Howard

1908 Eastern college football independents records
	Conf.			Overall
Team	W	L	T	W		L		T
Penn		–		11	–	0	–	1
Harvard		–		9	–	0	–	1
Cornell		–		7	–	1	–	1
Fordham		–		5	–	1	–	0
Yale		–		7	–	1	–	1
Dartmouth		–		6	–	1	–	1
Carlisle		–		10	–	2	–	1
Washington & Jefferson		–		10	–	2	–	1
Army		–		6	–	1	–	2
Pittsburgh		–		8	–	3	–	0
Lafayette		–		6	–	2	–	2
Princeton		–		5	–	2	–	3
Syracuse		–		6	–	3	–	1
Brown		–		5	–	3	–	1
Temple		–		3	–	2	–	1
Colgate		–		4	–	3	–	0
Lehigh		–		4	–	3	–	0
Dickinson		–		5	–	4	–	0
Amherst		–		3	–	3	–	2
Holy Cross		–		4	–	4	–	0
Penn State		–		5	–	5	–	0
Vermont		–		3	–	3	–	3
Wesleyan		–		3	–	4	–	2
Springfield Training School		–		3	–	4	–	1
NYU		–		2	–	3	–	2
Franklin & Marshall		–		4	–	6	–	1
Bucknell		–		3	–	5	–	2
Rutgers		–		3	–	5	–	1
Boston College		–		2	–	4	–	2
Carnegie Tech		–		3	–	7	–	0
Geneva		–		1	–	6	–	2
Tufts		–		1	–	6	–	1
Villanova		–		1	–	6	–	0
New Hampshire		–		1	–	7	–	0
Drexel		–		0	–	7	–	0

The 1908 Springfield Training School football team was an American football team that represented the International Young Men's Christian Association Training School—now known as Springfield College–as an independent during the 1908 college football season. Led by 11th-year head coach James H. McCurdy, Springfield compiled a record of 3–4–1.

== Schedule ==
Date	Time	Opponent	Site	Result	Attendance	Source
September 26		Williston Seminary	Springfield, MA	L 0–4		
October 3		at Princeton	University Field; Princeton, NJ	L 0–18		
October 10		Connecticut	Springfield, MA	W 21–0		
October 17	3:00 p.m.	at Harvard	Harvard Stadium; Boston, MA	L 0–44	15,000	
October 24		Worcester Tech	Springfield, MA	W 23–0		
October 31		Wesleyan	Springfield, MA	W 11–0		
November 7		at Army	The Plain; West Point, NY	L 5–6		
November 14		Massachusetts	Springfield, MA	L 5–5		
