= 1908 Villanova Wildcats football team =

American college football season

1908 Villanova Wildcats football
- Conference: Independent
- Record: 1–6
- Head coach: Fred Crolius (5th season)
- Captain: Joseph Walsh
- Home stadium: College Field

1908 Eastern college football independents records
	Conf.			Overall
Team	W	L	T	W		L		T
Penn		–		11	–	0	–	1
Harvard		–		9	–	0	–	1
Cornell		–		7	–	1	–	1
Fordham		–		5	–	1	–	0
Yale		–		7	–	1	–	1
Dartmouth		–		6	–	1	–	1
Carlisle		–		10	–	2	–	1
Washington & Jefferson		–		10	–	2	–	1
Army		–		6	–	1	–	2
Pittsburgh		–		8	–	3	–	0
Lafayette		–		6	–	2	–	2
Princeton		–		5	–	2	–	3
Syracuse		–		6	–	3	–	1
Brown		–		5	–	3	–	1
Temple		–		3	–	2	–	1
Colgate		–		4	–	3	–	0
Lehigh		–		4	–	3	–	0
Dickinson		–		5	–	4	–	0
Amherst		–		3	–	3	–	2
Holy Cross		–		4	–	4	–	0
Penn State		–		5	–	5	–	0
Vermont		–		3	–	3	–	3
Wesleyan		–		3	–	4	–	2
Springfield Training School		–		3	–	4	–	1
NYU		–		2	–	3	–	2
Franklin & Marshall		–		4	–	6	–	1
Bucknell		–		3	–	5	–	2
Rutgers		–		3	–	5	–	1
Boston College		–		2	–	4	–	2
Carnegie Tech		–		3	–	7	–	0
Geneva		–		1	–	6	–	2
Tufts		–		1	–	6	–	1
Villanova		–		1	–	6	–	0
New Hampshire		–		1	–	7	–	0
Drexel		–		0	–	7	–	0

The 1908 Villanova Wildcats football team represented Villanova University as an independent during the 1908 college football season. Led by fifth-year head coach Fred Crolius, Villanova compiled a record of 1–6. The team's captain was Joseph Walsh.

== Schedule ==
Date	Opponent	Site	Result	Source
September 26	at Carlisle	Indian Field; Carlisle, PA	L 0–10	
October 7	at Penn	Franklin Field; Philadelphia, PA	L 0–11	
October 14	at Princeton	University Field; Princeton, NJ	L 0–6	
October 22	Jefferson Medical College	College Field; Villanova, PA	W 45–0	
November 7	at Navy	Worden Field; Annapolis, MD	L 6–30	
November 21	at Army	The Plain; West Point, NY	L 0–25	
November 26	at Fordham	American League Park; New York, NY	L 0–2	
