= Massachusetts College of Osteopathy =

The Massachusetts College of Osteopathy was an American Osteopathic college that operated from 1897 to 1944.

The Massachusetts College of Osteopathy was established as the Boston Institute of Osteopathy in October 1897. It was incorporated on October 31, 1898. The founding officers were Dr. Clinton E. Achorn (president), Sidney A. Ellis (vice president), Dr. Ada A. Achorn (secretary and treasurer).

From 1897 to 1900, the Massachusetts College of Osteopathy was located in Suite 1 of The Ilkley (176 Huntington Avenue, Boston). Due to increased enrollment, the school moved to 696 Huntington Avenue. When that building was sold to the Harvard Medical School, the College of Osteopathy temporarily relocated to an apartment building on the corner of Vancouver Street and Huntington Avenue. In 1904, the school moved to the John Brown estate at 12 Craigie Street in Cambridge, Massachusetts. In 1913, the college purchased the larger Johanna Quinn House in East Cambridge so that the school, hospital, and dispensary all could be located in one place. The college moved to the Quinn House in November 1916. In January 1918 it moved again, this time to 415 Newbury Street in Boston. In 1939 the college opened a new hospital and college at 619 Commonwealth Avenue.

In 1902, the school became one of the first osteopathic colleges to expand its course of study. In September 1902 the course was expanded from 20 months to 24 months. The following year it was expanded to a three year course of nine months each. In 1915 the program was increased to four years.

On January 30, 1903, the school's name was changed to the Massachusetts College of Osteopathy and new officers were elected. Dr. Wilfred E. Harris became the school's new president, Dr. Howard T. Crawford became vice president, Dr. Francis Killpatrick Byrkit was elected secretary, and Frank M. Slagle, who had been serving as the school's dean since February 1902, was given the additional role as school treasurer. In 1906 the state gave the college a license to award the Doctor of Osteopathic Medicine degree. On July 18, 1916, Dr. Eldridge D. Atwood, a 1914 graduate of the College of Osteopathy shot president Wilfred E. Harris at his office at the Hotel Buckminster. Atwood shot Harris two hours after his girlfriend and fellow College of Osteopathy alumni Dr. Celia Adams committed suicide. Atwood stated that his motive for the crime was Harris' romantic involvement with Adams. Harris died from his wounds on July 25, 1916. Harris was succeeded as president by the rector of the Church of the Ascension in Cambridge, Rev. Francis L. Beal. Beal was the first member of the clergy to head a medical college.

The Massachusetts College of Osteopathy closed in 1944.
