= 1908 Fordham Maroon football team =

American football team

1908 Fordham Maroon football
- Conference: Independent
- Record: 17–3–1 / 5–1
- Head coach: Howard Gargan (1st season)
- Captain: Leo Fitzpatrick
- Home stadium: Fordham Field

1908 Eastern college football independents records
	Conf.			Overall
Team	W	L	T	W		L		T
Penn		–		11	–	0	–	1
Harvard		–		9	–	0	–	1
Cornell		–		7	–	1	–	1
Fordham		–		5	–	1	–	0
Yale		–		7	–	1	–	1
Dartmouth		–		6	–	1	–	1
Carlisle		–		10	–	2	–	1
Washington & Jefferson		–		10	–	2	–	1
Army		–		6	–	1	–	2
Pittsburgh		–		8	–	3	–	0
Lafayette		–		6	–	2	–	2
Princeton		–		5	–	2	–	3
Syracuse		–		6	–	3	–	1
Brown		–		5	–	3	–	1
Temple		–		3	–	2	–	1
Colgate		–		4	–	3	–	0
Lehigh		–		4	–	3	–	0
Dickinson		–		5	–	4	–	0
Amherst		–		3	–	3	–	2
Holy Cross		–		4	–	4	–	0
Penn State		–		5	–	5	–	0
Vermont		–		3	–	3	–	3
Wesleyan		–		3	–	4	–	2
Springfield Training School		–		3	–	4	–	1
NYU		–		2	–	3	–	2
Franklin & Marshall		–		4	–	6	–	1
Bucknell		–		3	–	5	–	2
Rutgers		–		3	–	5	–	1
Boston College		–		2	–	4	–	2
Carnegie Tech		–		3	–	7	–	0
Geneva		–		1	–	6	–	2
Tufts		–		1	–	6	–	1
Villanova		–		1	–	6	–	0
New Hampshire		–		1	–	7	–	0
Drexel		–		0	–	7	–	0

The 1908 Fordham Maroon football team was an American football team that represented Fordham University as an independent during the 1908 college football season. Fordham claims a 17–3–1 record, and College Football Data Warehouse (CFDW) lists the team's record at 5–1.

Howard Gargan, who was the captain and quarterback of Fordham's 1907 team, served as the team's head coach. Leo Fitzpatrick was the 1908 team captain.

The team played its home games at Fordham Field on the school's campus in The Bronx and at the American League Park in the Washington Park neighborhood of Manhattan.

== Schedule ==
The following six games are reported in Fordham's media guide, CFDW, and contemporaneous press coverage.

Date	Opponent	Site	Result	Attendance	Source
October 3	at Amherst	Amherst, MA	W 5–0		
October 17	Jefferson Medical College	Fordham Field; Bronx NY	W 45–0		
October 21	at Princeton	Princeton, NJ	L 0–17		
November 3	Georgetown	American League Park; New York, NY	W 22–0	3,000	
November 21	RPI	Fordham Field; Bronx, NY	W 22–12		
November 26	Villanova	American League Park; New York, NY	W 2–0		

The following are 13 additional games reported in the Fordham media guide.

Date	Opponent	Site	Result	Source
	NYU		T 0–0	
	Medico		W 30–0	
	Fort Totten		W 17–6	
	Fort Wadsworth		W 14–6	
	Fort Hancock		W 17–7	
	Betts Academy		W 34–0	
	Murray Hill Athletic Club		W 28–7	
	Bedford Athletic Club		L 0–17	
	Syracuse		W 6–0	
	Commerce High School		W	
	NYU		W 18–0	
	Adelphi		L 7–9	
	Peekskill Military Academy		W	
