= 1908 Princeton Tigers football team =

American college football season

1908 Princeton Tigers football
- Conference: Independent
- Record: 5–2–3
- Head coach: Bill Roper (3rd season)
- Offensive scheme: Short punt
- Captain: Edward Dillon
- Home stadium: University Field

1908 Eastern college football independents records
	Conf.			Overall
Team	W	L	T	W		L		T
Penn		–		11	–	0	–	1
Harvard		–		9	–	0	–	1
Cornell		–		7	–	1	–	1
Fordham		–		5	–	1	–	0
Yale		–		7	–	1	–	1
Dartmouth		–		6	–	1	–	1
Carlisle		–		10	–	2	–	1
Washington & Jefferson		–		10	–	2	–	1
Army		–		6	–	1	–	2
Pittsburgh		–		8	–	3	–	0
Lafayette		–		6	–	2	–	2
Princeton		–		5	–	2	–	3
Syracuse		–		6	–	3	–	1
Brown		–		5	–	3	–	1
Temple		–		3	–	2	–	1
Colgate		–		4	–	3	–	0
Lehigh		–		4	–	3	–	0
Dickinson		–		5	–	4	–	0
Amherst		–		3	–	3	–	2
Holy Cross		–		4	–	4	–	0
Penn State		–		5	–	5	–	0
Vermont		–		3	–	3	–	3
Wesleyan		–		3	–	4	–	2
Springfield Training School		–		3	–	4	–	1
NYU		–		2	–	3	–	2
Frankin & Marshall		–		4	–	6	–	1
Bucknell		–		3	–	5	–	2
Rutgers		–		3	–	5	–	1
Boston College		–		2	–	4	–	2
Carnegie Tech		–		3	–	7	–	0
Geneva		–		1	–	6	–	2
Tufts		–		1	–	6	–	1
Villanova		–		1	–	6	–	0
New Hampshire		–		1	–	7	–	0
Drexel		–		0	–	7	–	0

The 1908 Princeton Tigers football team represented Princeton University in the 1908 college football season. The team finished with a 5–2–3 record under third-year head coach Bill Roper. Princeton halfback Frederick Tibbott was selected as a consensus first-team honoree on the 1908 College Football All-America Team, and tackle Rudolph Siegling also received first-team honors from multiple selectors.

== Schedule ==
Date	Opponent	Site	Result	Source
October 3	Springfield Training School	University Field; Princeton, NJ	W 18–0	
October 7	Stevens	University Field; Princeton, NJ	W 21–0	
October 10	Lafayette	University Field; Princeton, NJ	T 0–0	
October 14	Villanova	University Field; Princeton, NJ	W 6–0	
October 17	VPI	University Field; Princeton, NJ	W 10–4	
October 21	Fordham	University Field; Princeton, NJ	W 17–0	
October 25	Syracuse	University Field; Princeton, NJ	T 0–0	
October 31	at Army	The Plain; West Point, NY	T 0–0	
November 7	vs. Dartmouth	Polo Grounds; New York, NY	L 6–10	
November 14	Yale	University Field; Princeton, NJ (rivalry)	L 6–11	
