= 1908 Penn State Nittany Lions football team =

American college football season

1908 Penn State Nittany Lions football
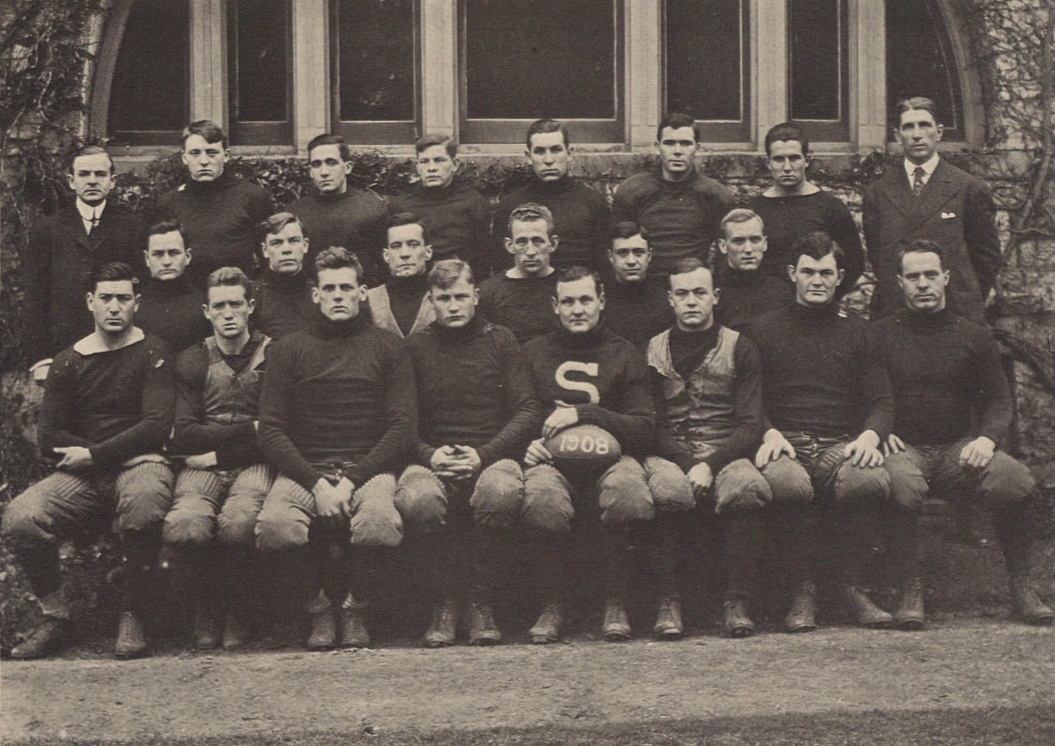
- Conference: Independent
- Record: 5–5
- Head coach: Tom Fennell (5th season)
- Captain: Bull McCleary
- Home stadium: Beaver Field

1908 Eastern college football independents records
	Conf.			Overall
Team	W	L	T	W		L		T
Penn		–		11	–	0	–	1
Harvard		–		9	–	0	–	1
Cornell		–		7	–	1	–	1
Fordham		–		5	–	1	–	0
Yale		–		7	–	1	–	1
Dartmouth		–		6	–	1	–	1
Carlisle		–		10	–	2	–	1
Washington & Jefferson		–		10	–	2	–	1
Army		–		6	–	1	–	2
Pittsburgh		–		8	–	3	–	0
Lafayette		–		6	–	2	–	2
Princeton		–		5	–	2	–	3
Syracuse		–		6	–	3	–	1
Brown		–		5	–	3	–	1
Temple		–		3	–	2	–	1
Colgate		–		4	–	3	–	0
Lehigh		–		4	–	3	–	0
Dickinson		–		5	–	4	–	0
Amherst		–		3	–	3	–	2
Holy Cross		–		4	–	4	–	0
Penn State		–		5	–	5	–	0
Vermont		–		3	–	3	–	3
Wesleyan		–		3	–	4	–	2
Springfield Training School		–		3	–	4	–	1
NYU		–		2	–	3	–	2
Franklin & Marshall		–		4	–	6	–	1
Bucknell		–		3	–	5	–	2
Rutgers		–		3	–	5	–	1
Boston College		–		2	–	4	–	2
Carnegie Tech		–		3	–	7	–	0
Geneva		–		1	–	6	–	2
Tufts		–		1	–	6	–	1
Villanova		–		1	–	6	–	0
New Hampshire		–		1	–	7	–	0
Drexel		–		0	–	7	–	0

The 1908 Penn State Nittany Lions football team represented the Pennsylvania State University as an independent during the 1908 college football season. The team was coached by Tom Fennell and played its home games on Beaver Field in State College, Pennsylvania.

== Schedule ==
Date	Opponent	Site	Result	Attendance	Source
September 19	Bellefonte Academy	Beaver Field; State College, PA	L 5–6		
September 26	Grove City	Beaver Field; State College, PA	W 31–0		
October 3	vs. Carlisle	Driving Park; Wilkes-Barre, PA	L 5–12	10,000	
October 10	at Penn	Franklin Field; Philadelphia, PA	L 0–6	7,000	
October 17	Geneva	Beaver Field; State College, PA	W 51–0		
October 24	West Virginia	Beaver Field; State College, PA (rivalry)	W 12–0		
October 31	at Cornell	Ithaca, NY	L 4–10		
November 7	Bucknell	Beaver Field; State College, PA	W 33–6		
November 14	at Navy	Worden Field; Annapolis, MD	L 0–5		
November 26	at Pittsburgh	Exposition Park; Pittsburgh, PA (rivalry)	W 12–6	9,000	
