= 1908 Pittsburgh Panthers football team =

American college football season

1908 Pittsburgh Panthers football
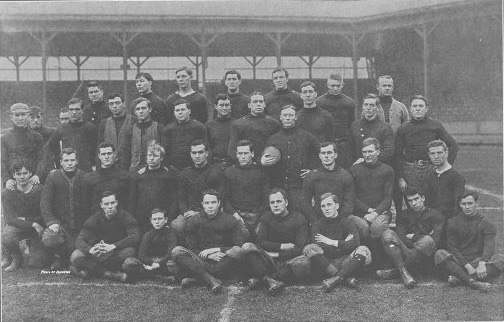
- Conference: Independent
- Record: 8–3
- Head coach: John A. Moorhead (2nd season)
- Captain: Quince Banbury
- Home stadium: Exposition Park

1908 Eastern college football independents records
| | Conf. | | | Overall |
| Team | W | L | T | W | | L | | T |
|---|---|---|---|---|---|---|---|---|
| Penn | | – | | 11 | – | 0 | – | 1 |
| Harvard | | – | | 9 | – | 0 | – | 1 |
| Cornell | | – | | 7 | – | 1 | – | 1 |
| Fordham | | – | | 5 | – | 1 | – | 0 |
| Yale | | – | | 7 | – | 1 | – | 1 |
| Dartmouth | | – | | 6 | – | 1 | – | 1 |
| Carlisle | | – | | 10 | – | 2 | – | 1 |
| Washington & Jefferson | | – | | 10 | – | 2 | – | 1 |
| Army | | – | | 6 | – | 1 | – | 2 |
| Pittsburgh | | – | | 8 | – | 3 | – | 0 |
| Lafayette | | – | | 6 | – | 2 | – | 2 |
| Princeton | | – | | 5 | – | 2 | – | 3 |
| Syracuse | | – | | 6 | – | 3 | – | 1 |
| Brown | | – | | 5 | – | 3 | – | 1 |
| Temple | | – | | 3 | – | 2 | – | 1 |
| Colgate | | – | | 4 | – | 3 | – | 0 |
| Lehigh | | – | | 4 | – | 3 | – | 0 |
| Dickinson | | – | | 5 | – | 4 | – | 0 |
| Amherst | | – | | 3 | – | 3 | – | 2 |
| Holy Cross | | – | | 4 | – | 4 | – | 0 |
| Penn State | | – | | 5 | – | 5 | – | 0 |
| Vermont | | – | | 3 | – | 3 | – | 3 |
| Wesleyan | | – | | 3 | – | 4 | – | 2 |
| Springfield Training School | | – | | 3 | – | 4 | – | 1 |
| NYU | | – | | 2 | – | 3 | – | 2 |
| Franklin & Marshall | | – | | 4 | – | 6 | – | 1 |
| Bucknell | | – | | 3 | – | 5 | – | 2 |
| Rutgers | | – | | 3 | – | 5 | – | 1 |
| Boston College | | – | | 2 | – | 4 | – | 2 |
| Carnegie Tech | | – | | 3 | – | 7 | – | 0 |
| Geneva | | – | | 1 | – | 6 | – | 2 |
| Tufts | | – | | 1 | – | 6 | – | 1 |
| Villanova | | – | | 1 | – | 6 | – | 0 |
| New Hampshire | | – | | 1 | – | 7 | – | 0 |
| Drexel | | – | | 0 | – | 7 | – | 0 |

The 1908 Pittsburgh Panthers football team was an American football team that represented the University of Pittsburgh as an independent during the 1908 college football season.

== Schedule ==
| Date | Time | Opponent | Site | Result | Attendance | Source |
|---|---|---|---|---|---|---|
| October 3 | | Mount Union | Exposition Park; Pittsburgh, PA | W 26–4 | 1,200 | |
| October 10 | | Bethany (WV) | Exposition Park; Pittsburgh, PA | W 27–0 | | |
| October 17 | | Marietta | Exposition Park; Pittsburgh, PA | W 7–0 | 1,500 | |
| October 24 | | Bucknell | Exposition Park; Pittsburgh, PA | W 22–0 | 3,000 | |
| October 31 | 4:00 p.m. | at Saint Louis | Sportsman's Park; St. Louis, MO | W 13–0 | 12,000 | |
| November 3 | | Carnegie Tech | Exposition Park; Pittsburgh, PA | W 22–0 | | |
| November 7 | | West Virginia | Exposition Park; Pittsburgh, PA (rivalry) | W 11–0 | 4,000 | |
| November 14 | | Carlisle | Exposition Park; Pittsburgh, PA | L 0–6 | 7,000 | |
| November 21 | | Gettysburg | Exposition Park; Pittsburgh, PA | W 6–0 | 1,500 | |
| November 26 | | Penn State | Exposition Park; Pittsburgh, PA (rivalry) | L 6–12 | 9,000 | |
| December 5 | | Washington & Jefferson | Exposition Park; Pittsburgh, PA | L 0–14 | 6,100 | |
All times are in Eastern time

== Season recap ==
In July 1908, the Western University of Pennsylvania officially became the University of Pittsburgh. Hence, the cheers and songs emanating from the students at sporting contests had to be changed for the 1908 football season. In April, John A. Moorhead was hired to lead the football team for a second season. He hired ex-quarterback Karl Swenson as assistant coach. At the 1907 season ending banquet Quince Banbury was chosen captain by his teammates. The drama in this offseason centered on a request by Washington & Jefferson University's Athletic Committee for the Western University of Pennsylvania to sign an agreement to adopt a one-year residency rule for their athletes. They stated that they would only make this request of the Western University of Pennsylvania. The WUP Athletic Committee declined and severed ties with all Washington & Jefferson athletic teams. Late in November the Red and Black changed their mind and begged for a post season football game with the University of Pittsburgh. The details were worked out between Alexander Silverman, the graduate manager of athletics at Pitt and E. M. Murphy, the graduate manager of athletics at Washington & Jefferson. The University of Pittsburgh Athletic Committee agreed to mend relations with the Red and Black and the eleventh game was added to the schedule. The main plus to come out of the pettiness and then total reversal shown by Washington & Jefferson's Athletic Department was a rivalry played for the next twenty-one straight years. In its second season under head coach John A. Moorhead, the team compiled an 8–3 record and outscored opponents by a total of 140 to 36. At the conclusion of the season Mr. Moorhead resigned as coach and went into business with his father.

== Coaching staff ==
1908 Pittsburgh Panthers football staff
| Coaching staff: John A. Moorhead – Head coach; Karl Swenson – Assistant coach | Support staff: Alexander Silverman – Graduate manager of athletics; Dr. Andrew B. Wallgren – Physical director |

== Roster ==
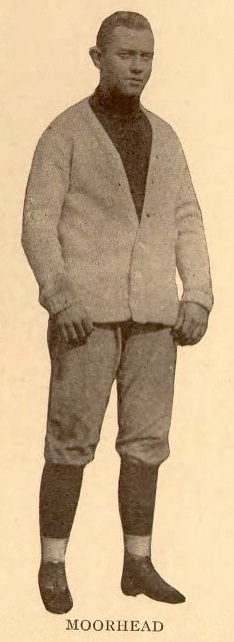
Coach John Moorhead

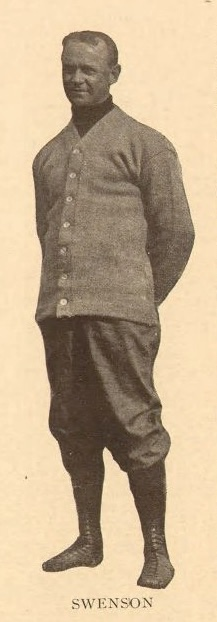
Assistant coach Swenson

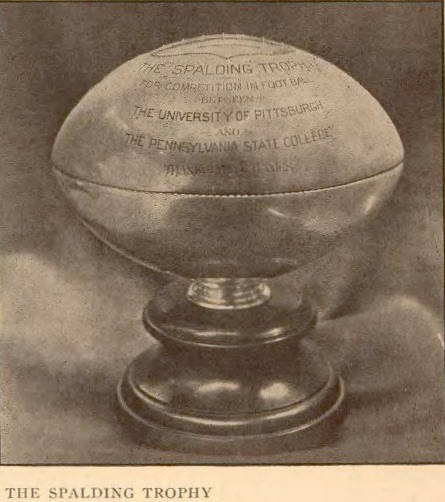
Spalding Trophy

1908 Pittsburgh Panther football roster
| Player | Position | Games | Height | Weight | Class | Prep School | Degree | Residence |
|---|---|---|---|---|---|---|---|---|
| Quincy Banbury^ | end | 8 | 5' 7" | 155 | 1908 | Salina H.S. (KS) | Doctor of Dental Surgery | Wichita, KS |
| Joseph Campbell^ | fullback | 9 | 5' 10" | 172 | 1909 | | Doctor of Dental Surgery | Woodlawn, PA |
| Edgar Chatham | end | 3 | 5' 7" | 150 | 1909 | Allegheny H.S. | Doctor of Medicine | Pittsburgh, PA |
| Maurice Goldsmith^ | end | 6 | 5' 10" | 164 | 1909 | Carnegie H.S. | Doctor of Medicine | Pittsburgh, PA |
| John Mackrell^ | fullback | 5 | 5' 8" | 165 | 1909 | Pittsburgh Academy | Doctor of Medicine | Pittsburgh, PA |
| Homer Roe^ | end | 11 | 5' 8" | 162 | 1910 | Allegheny H.S. | Doctor of Dental Surgery | Pittsburgh, PA |
| John Shuman^ | lineman | 10 | 6' 2" | 180 | 1910 | | Doctor of Medicine | Sioux City, IA |
| Frank Van Doren^ | tackle | 9 | 6' 1" | 212 | 1911 | Warrensburg Normal | Doctor of Medicine | Seaside, OR |
| Robert Richards^ | tackle | 10 | 5' 11" | 175 | 1910 | Wilkinsburg H.S. | Mechanical Engineering | Butler, PA |
| Elwood Joseph DeLozier | quarterback | 1 | 5' 6" | 135 | 1909 | | Doctor of Dental Surgery | Pitcairn, PA |
| James Stevenson^ | tackle | 6 | 6' | 198 | 1912 | Chester H.S. (WVA) | Doctor of Medicine | Pittsburgh, PA |
| Jack Turner^ | tackle | 5 | 5' 8" | 189 | 1908 | Salina H.S. (KS) | Associate Law | Gregg, PA |
| Arthur Yielding^ | center | 7 | 6' | 215 | 1909 | Guthrie H.S. (OK) | Doctor of Medicine | Portland, OR |
| Samuel Elliott^ | guard | 11 | 6' 4" | 185 | 1911 | | Medical Department | |
| John “Jack” Lindsay^ | end | 11 | 5' 11" | 155 | 1912 | Johnstown H.S. | Doctor of Dental Surgery | Johnstown, PA |
| Charles Quailey | halfback | 5 | 5' 9" | 158 | 1912 | Dennison H.S. | Doctor of Dental Surgery | Pittsburgh, PA |
| George Bailey^ | tackle | 10 | 5' 10" | 178 | 1911 | East Stroudsburg Normal | Doctor of Dental Surgery | Scranton, PA |
| Richard Hoblitzell | end | 1 | 5' 11" | 160 | 1909 | Butler H.S. | Associate Dental Degree | Boston, MA |
| William Carson | end | 0 | 5' 11" | 165 | 1911 | Sharpsburg H.S. | Doctor of Dental Surgery | Ambridge, PA |
| Norman Budd | quarterback | 4 | 5' 8" | 150 | 1911 | Sharon H.S. | Associate Dental | Farrell, PA |
| Frank Barrett^ | quarterback | 11 | 5' 9" | 156 | | | Engineering Department | transferred to Penn State |
| Raymond Butler | halfback | 0 | 5' 7" | 135 | 1910 | Pittsburg H.S. | Doctor of Dental Surgery | Sharon, PA |
| Clarence Hapgood | quarterback | 0 | 5' 7" | 140 | 1911 | Warren H.S. | Doctor of Dental Surgery | Erie, PA |
| William Watson | end | 0 | 5' 10" | 150 | 1910 | | Doctor of Medicine | Library, PA |
| Harry Pontius | halfback | 0 | 5' 7" | 145 | 1909 | | Graduate Pharmacy | Pittsburgh, PA |
| Theodore Straub | center | 0 | 5' 10" | 175 | 1910 | Stroyestown, PA | Doctor of Dental Surgery | Somerset, PA |
| Marion Sayre | center | 4 | 5' 10" | 185 | 1912 | New Brighton H.S. | Associate Medical | Philadelphia, PA |
| Don Lindsay | end | 0 | 5' 10" | 155 | | Johnstown H. S. | | |
| Henry A. Blair | tackle | 1 | 6' | 185 | 1912 | Allegheny H.S. | Dental Department | |
| Harry U. Ent^ | halfback | 10 | 6' | 170 | 1912 | Ridgway H.S. | Law School | |
| William Rosser | halfback | 7 | 5' 8" | 156 | 1912 | Pittsburgh H.S. | Medical School | |
| Edward J. Ebeck | tackle | 0 | 6' 1" | 180 | 1910 | | | |
| Peter Glick | quarterback | 1 | 5' 7" | 150 | 1911 | Pittsburgh H.S. | Law School | Pittsburgh, PA |
| Tynan | end | 1 | | | | | | |
| Eggers | end | 1 | | | | | | |
^ Lettermen

== Game summaries ==
=== Mount Union ===
Mount Union at Pitt

| Team | 1 | 2 | Total |
|---|---|---|---|
| Mount Union | 4 | 0 | 4 |
| • Pitt | 16 | 10 | 26 |

- Date: October 3, 1908
- Location: Exposition Park
  Pittsburgh, PA
- Game attendance: 1,200
- Referee: W. F. Farrar (U. of Pennsylvania)

On October 3 Pitt opened the 1908 football season at Exposition Park against the Mount Union College Purple of Alliance, Ohio. Twelve hundred fans turned out to cheer on the new edition of University of Pittsburgh football. The Pittsburg Press noted: "The system of numbering the local and visiting players will be adopted again this year and in this way the spectators will be able to follow the game well by referring to their programs. The numbers are sewed on the back of each player's jersey and can be distinguished from any part of the field." Both teams were healthy and anxious to play.

Mount Union started strong. They recovered a Pitt fumble on the Pitt fifteen yard line. They were able to move the ball five yards closer and Purple Raider fullback O'Brien was successful on a field goal. Pitt protested that the ball should have been theirs on downs. The referee agreed with Pitt and their offense went to work. An onside kick moved the ball across midfield. On second down Quince Banbury raced forty yards around left end for the first score. Jack Lindsay was successful on the goal after. Minutes later Banbury recovered an onside kick and scored his second touchdown. Lindsay missed the point after. The Pitt offense regained possession and Banbury ran forty-eight yards for his third touchdown of the half. Lindsay's kick was blocked. The Mount Union offense moved the ball to the Pitt five yard line and O'Brien connected on a field goal. That one counted and the halftime score was 16-4.

Quince Banbury and Joe Campbell scored second half touchdowns to make the final score 26-4. Coach Moorhead made wholesale substitutions and the Pitt offense had the ball on Mount Union's three yard line as time expired. Mount Union finished the season with a 5-4-1 record.

The Pitt starting lineup for the game against Mount Union was Maurice Goldsmith (left end), George Bailey (left tackle), Samuel Elliott (left guard), John Turner (center), John Shuman (right guard), Tex Richards (right tackle), Jack Lindsay (right end), Fritz Barrett (quarterback), Quince Banbury (left halfback), John Mackrell (right halfback), and Rosser (fullback). Substitutions made during the game were: Joe Campbell replaced William Rosser at fullback; Harry Ent replaced John Mackrell at right halfback; Marion Sayre replaced John Turner at center; James Stevenson replaced Samuel Elliott at left guard; Edgar Chatham replaced Quince Banbury at left halfback; and Homer Roe replaced Maurice Goldsmith at left end. The game consisted of one twenty minute half and one fifteen minute half.

=== Bethany ===
Bethany at Pitt

| Team | 1 | 2 | Total |
|---|---|---|---|
| Bethany | 0 | 0 | 0 |
| • Pitt | 12 | 15 | 27 |

- Date: October 10, 1908
- Location: Exposition Park
  Pittsburgh, PA
- Referee: Walter S. Sugden (Harvard)

On a rainy October 10 the Bethany Bisons visited Exposition Park to take on Pitt. The Bisons fumbled on their first possession and Pitt recovered. The Pitt offense advanced the ball to the six yard line but lost the ball on downs. Bethany punted and Pitt returned the ball to the Bison eighteen yard line. Five plays later Quince Banbury plunged into the end zone for the first touchdown of the game. Center John Turner kicked the goal after. The Pitt offense was again efficient on their next possession and scored easily to make the score 12-0 at the break.

Coach Moorhead made numerous substitutions at halftime. Pitt end Homer Roe caught the second half kickoff on his twenty yard line and raced untouched ninety yards into the end zone. Turner was unsuccessful on the goal kick. The Bethany offense was then able to move into Pitt territory but missed a field goal. The Pitt offense asserted their dominance for the remainder of the game as John Mackrell scored two touchdowns to make the final score 27-0. Bethany would finish the season with a 4-3-1 record.

The Pitt starting lineup for the game against Bethany was Maurice Goldsmith (left end), George Bailey (left tackle), Samuel Elliott (left guard), John Turner (center), John Shuman (right guard), Tex Richards (right tackle), Jack Lindsay (right end), Fritz Barrett (quarterback), Quince Banbury (left halfback), Harry Ent (right halfback), and Joe Campbell (fullback). Substitutions made during the game were: Charles Quailey replaced Quince Banbury at left halfback; John Mackrell replaced Harry Ent at right halfback; Homer Roe replaced John Lindsay at right end; Marion Sayre replaced John Turner at center; James Stevenson replaced Samuel Elliott at left guard; William Rosser replaced Joe Campbell at fullback; Norman Budd replaced Fritz Barrett at quarterback; Edgar Chatham replaced Charles Quailey at left halfback; Henry Blair replaced Tex Richards at right tackle; Tynan replaced Maurice Goldsmith at left end; Richard Hoblitzell replaced George Bailey at left tackle; Eggers replaced Homer Roe; Pete Glick replaced Norman Budd at quarterback; and Elwood DeLozier replaced Glick at quarterback. The game was played in 15-minute halves.

=== Marietta ===
Marietta at Pitt

| Team | 1 | 2 | Total |
|---|---|---|---|
| Marietta | 0 | 0 | 0 |
| • Pitt | 7 | 0 | 7 |

- Date: October 17, 1908
- Location: Exposition Park
  Pittsburgh, PA
- Game attendance: 1,500
- Referee: Walter S. Sugden (Harvard)

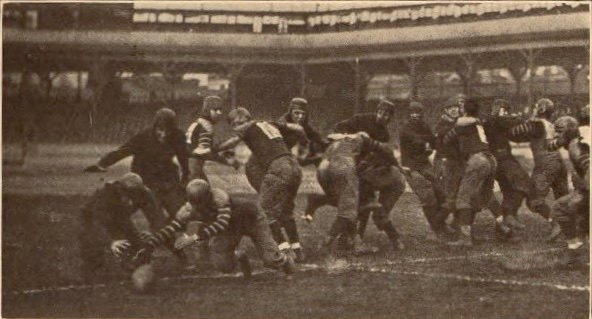
Marietta game action

On October 17 the Pioneers of Marietta College gave the Pitt eleven another scare as they held the home team to a 7-0 score. The Pitt lineup was missing center John Turner (ankle injury), Captain Quince Banbury (torn ligament in leg), and tackle Frank Van Doren (shoulder separation). They were lucky to come away with a victory. End Jack Lindsay was nursing sore ribs but was able to play. The Marietta offense preferred to have the ball in Pitt's hands so they punted often. Pitt scored on their third possession. A Charles Quailey pass to Homer Roe was good for a twenty-seven yard gain to the thirteen yard line of Marietta. Marietta then intercepted an onside kick. Marietta punted right back to Pitt. Charles Quailey onside kicked to George Bailey at Marietta's seven yard line. Joe Campbell plunged over from the one foot line. The goal kick after was unsuccessful. Two possessions later Pitt quarterback Barrett punted to Pioneer quarterback Horne. Horne fumbled the ball into the end zone and recovered but was tackled in the end zone for a safety. During Pittsburgh's next possession, Barrett was tackled and knocked out of the game. Norman Budd replaced him for the rest of the game. The halftime score was 7-0.

The second half produced no scoring. Coach Moorhead made multiple substitutions. Left end Starr of Marietta was ejected for slugging and Pitt had possession on the Marietta eleven yard line. William Rosser advanced nine yards to the two yard line. Pitt fumbled on the next play and Reiter of Marietta scampered to the twenty-five before he was tackled. The Pioneers offense could not sustain a drive. Both defenses were the stars of the game. Marietta finished the season with a 6-2 record.

The Pitt starting lineup for the Marietta game was Homer Roe (left end), George Bailey (left tackle), Samuel Elliott (left guard), Marion Sayre (center), John Shuman (right guard), Tex Richards (right tackle), Jack Lindsay (right end), Fritz Barrett (quarterback), Charles Quailey (left halfback), Harry Ent (right halfback), and Joe Campbell (fullback). Substitutions made during the game were: Maurice Goldsmith replaced John Lindsay at right end; Norman Budd replaced Fritz Barrett at quarterback; Frank Van Doren replaced George Bailey at left tackle; John Mackrell replaced Harry Ent at right halfback; Arthur Yielding replaced Samuel Elliott at left guard; and Edgar Chatham replaced Charles Quailey at left halfback. The game was played in 20-minute halves.

=== Bucknell ===
Bucknell at Pitt

| Team | 1 | 2 | Total |
|---|---|---|---|
| Bucknell | 0 | 0 | 0 |
| • Pitt | 5 | 17 | 22 |

- Date: October 24, 1908
- Location: Exposition Park
  Pittsburgh, PA
- Game attendance: 3,000
- Referee: Lt. H. B. Hackett (West Point)

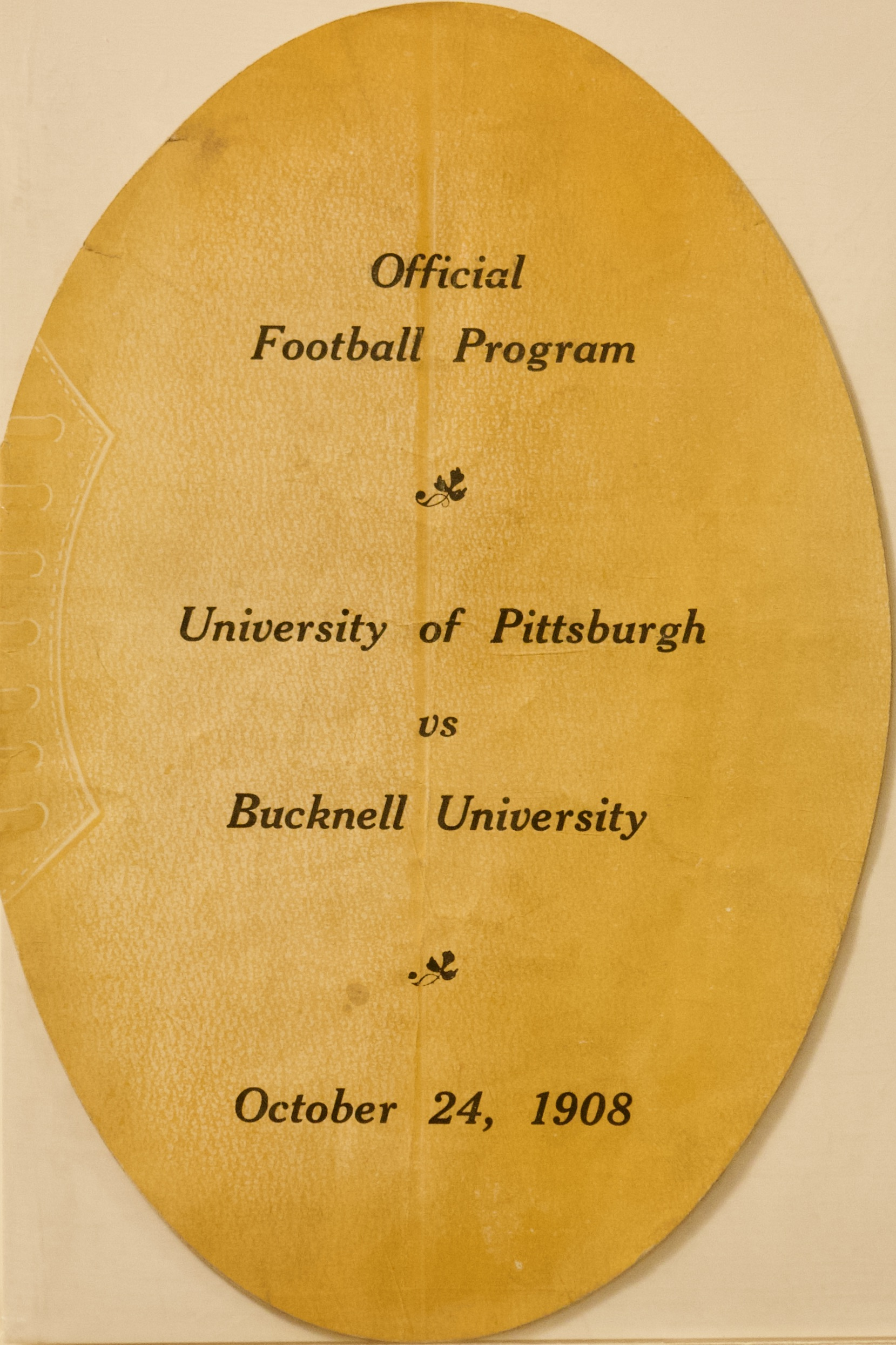
Game Day Program

On October 24 the University of Pittsburgh football team played their first "hard" opponent of the season in front of 3,000 fans at Exposition Park. Bucknell from Lewisburg, Pennsylvania was considered a step above the three previous opponents. Pitt was healthier with Frank Van Doren at tackle, Fritz Barrett at quarterback and Quince Banbury at halfback. Coach Moorhead replaced Joe Campbell at fullback with "Tex" Richards.

On Pitt's first offensive down of the game Banbury raced forty-five yards for a touchdown but Pitt was called for holding and the ball brought back. On Pitt's next possession they fumbled on Bucknell's twenty yard line. They proceeded to fumble on their next four possessions. The Bucknell offense was ineffective and either punted or fumbled right back. Late in the half Bucknell punted and Pitt had the ball in Bucknell territory. An onside kick gained twenty-eight yards and then "Tex" Richards carried the pigskin into the end zone for the first touchdown. Homer Roe missed the goal after. Coach Moorhead was not pleased with the first half effort.

Pitt scored on their first possession of the second half. Banbury gained fifty-five yards on two carries and Ent plunged over the goal line from the two for the second touchdown. Sam Elliott missed the point after. Pitt 10 - Bucknell 0. After a missed field goal by Roe, Captain Banbury scampered thirty yards for a touchdown and Elliott made the point after for a 16-0 lead. Bucknell's McAllister kicked off to "Tex" Richards on the five yard line and he proceeded to traverse the one hundred and five yards unimpeded to score the final touchdown of the day. The Pittsburgh Sunday Post described the run as "one of the most sensational touchdown ever seen on the Exposition field. He dodged man after man and, like a veritable steam engine, plowed through the opposition". Elliott was again successful on the goal kick after making the final tally 22-0. Bucknell finished the season with a 2-5-2 record.

The Pitt starting lineup for the game against Bucknell was Homer Roe (left end), George Bailey (left tackle), Samuel Elliott (left guard), Marion Sayre (center), John Shuman (right guard), Frank Van Doren (right tackle), Jack Lindsay (right end), Fritz Barrett (quarterback), Quince Banbury (left halfback), William Rosser (right halfback), and Tex Richards (fullback). Substitutions made during the game were: Harry Ent replaced William Rosser at right halfback; Norman Budd replaced Fritz Barrett at quarterback; Maurice Goldsmith replaced Jack Lindsay at left end; and Charles Quailey replaced Quince Banbury at left halfback. The game was played in 25-minute halves.

=== At Saint Louis ===
Pitt at Saint Louis

| Team | 1 | 2 | Total |
|---|---|---|---|
| • Pitt | 6 | 7 | 13 |
| Saint Louis | 0 | 0 | 0 |

- Date: October 31, 1908
- Location: Sportsman's Park
  St. Louis, MO
- Game attendance: 2,500
- Referee: Ralph A. Bard (Princeton)

The University of Pittsburgh football team traveled west to St. Louis for their only road game of the 1908 season. Pitt contingent of fifty plus boarded the Pennsylvania Railroad car on Thursday evening October 29 and arrived in St. Louis on Friday morning. Twenty-five hundred fans assembled at Sportsman's Park on Saturday to see the undefeated Saint Louis Blue and White led by coach Eddie Cochems, "father of the forward pass", take on the undefeated University of Pittsburgh squad. The crowd size was less than expected because it cost $1.00 for admission. Pitt was healthy except for Jack Turner at center. Frank Acker, the starting quarterback of Saint Louis, was injured and replaced by Cornet in the starting lineup.

The game was a defensive struggle with two sensational offensive plays by the Pitt team determining the outcome. Late in the first half Pitt got possession of the ball on the St. Louis 43-yard line. On first down Tex Richards broke free of the line of scrimmage and raced into the end zone for the game's first score. Sam Elliott was successful on the point after and Pitt led 6–0 at halftime. On the first possession of the second half St. Louis was backed up on their eight yard line attempting to punt. The center snap went over punter Schumacher's head and into the end zone where he recovered for a safety and two more points for Pitt. Two possessions later Pitt had the ball on their own 46-yard line. Fritz Barrett connected on a forward pass to Homer Roe for a 64-yard touchdown. The point after was not successful. The final score was 13–0. This was the Saint Louis's first home loss in three years.

The Pittsburgh Daily Post spoke with coach Cochems: "I congratulate the Pittsburgh team as well as Coach Moorhead on the game they played. Their style of play was splendid and in executing the forward pass they are the superior of any team I have seen yet, not even excepting the Indians and Penn. They proved a little too speedy for us, although our team played good football." The Billikens finished the season with a 6–2–2 record.

The Pitt starting lineup for the game against Saint Louis was Homer Roe (left end), Frank Van Doren (left tackle), Samuel Elliott (left guard), Arthur Yielding (center), John Shuman (right guard), George Bailey (right tackle), Jack Lindsay (right end), Fritz Barrett (quarterback), Harry Ent (left halfback), Quince Banbury (right halfback), and Tex Richards (fullback). At some point during the game James Stevenson replaced Samuel Elliott at left guard The game was played in 25-minute halves.

=== Carnegie Tech ===
Carnegie Tech at Pitt

| Team | 1 | 2 | Total |
|---|---|---|---|
| Carnegie Tech | 0 | 0 | 0 |
| • Pitt | 16 | 6 | 22 |

- Date: November 3, 1908
- Location: Exposition Park
  Pittsburgh, PA
- Referee: Nathan Stauffer (U. of Pennsylvania)

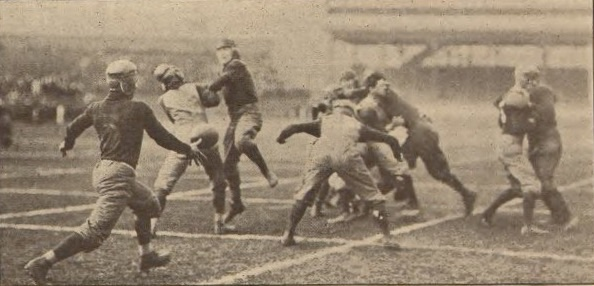
Carnegie Tech game action

The third chapter of the city series with Carnegie Tech took place on election day, Tuesday November 3, at Exposition Park. In spite of the western trip and only one day of practice, the Pitt team dominated the Tartans. The Pittsburg Press noted: "Shortly after the game started the Pittsburgh authorities were tipped off to the fact that three spies from the Carlisle Indian School and one from the University of West Virginia were on the field, Coach Moorhead at once ordered his men to cut out all trick plays, and resort only to straight football."

Captain Banbury (halfback), Jack Turner (center) and John Shuman (tackle) were all out of the lineup due to injuries, but the Pitt offense scored sixteen points in the first half. Halfback Charles Quailey scored on Pitt's opening possession, but he later had to leave the game due to a concussion. After a Pitt touchdown by Homer Roe was called back due to a penalty, Tex Richards added two more touchdowns and Roe was good on one point after.

Tech played better defense in the second half but Richards was able to add another touchdown and Roe was good on the goal kick after to make the final score 22-0. The Pitt offense gained four hundred and fifty-four yards. Tech gained six yards in the first half and one yard in the second. Penalty-wise Pitt was assessed 100 yards for infractions and Tech only 20 yards. Carnegie Tech finished the season with a 3-7 record.

The Pitt starting lineup for the game against Carnegie Tech was Homer Roe (left end), Frank Van Doren (left tackle), Samuel Elliott (left guard), Arthur Yielding (center), James Stevenson (right guard), George Bailey (right tackle), Jack Lindsay (right end), Fritz Barrett (quarterback), Harry Ent (left halfback), Charles Quailey (right halfback), and Tex Richards (fullback). Substitutions made during the game were: Tex Richards replaced Charles Quailey at right halfback; Joe Campbell replaced Tex Richards at fullback; William Rosser replaced Harry Ent at left halfback; and John Makrell replaced William Rosser at left halfback. The game was played in 25-minute halves.

=== West Virginia ===
West Virginia at Pitt

| Team | 1 | 2 | Total |
|---|---|---|---|
| West Virginia | 0 | 0 | 0 |
| • Pitt | 5 | 6 | 11 |

- Date: November 7, 1908
- Location: Exposition Park
  Pittsburgh, PA
- Game attendance: 4,000
- Referee: F. A. Godcharles (Lafayette)

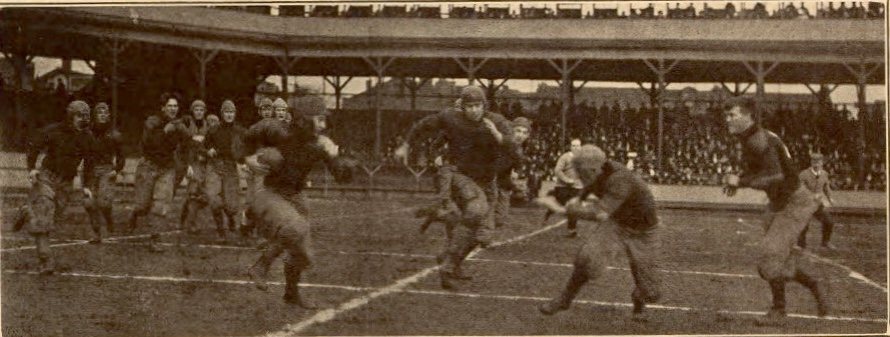
West Virginia game action

On November 7 the tenth edition of the Backyard Brawl was staged at Exposition Park in front of four thousand noisy rooters. John Shuman was back in the lineup at guard for Pitt, but halfback Banbury, center Turner and halfback Quailey were not available for action. West Virginia was healthy.

Pitt kicked off and the Mountaineers' halfback Young ran the ball out to the seventeen yard line. On first down Young fumbled. Pitt end Jack Lindsay picked up the loose ball and raced into the end zone for a touchdown thirty seconds into the game. Sam Elliott missed the point after. For the remainder of the first half it was a defensive struggle. Fritz Barrett missed two field goal attempts and Pitt advanced the ball to the West Virginia four yard line and could not score.

Late in the game Pitt fumbled and the Mountaineers recovered on Pitt's twenty-three yard line. WVa backs Nebinger and Diffendal carried the ball to the nine. On second down Pitt end Homer Roe intercepted quarterback Pearcy's throw on the seven and raced one hundred and three yards for a touchdown. Roe was successful on the goal after and Pitt led 11-0. On the next kickoff Tex Richards outdid his teammate and ran one hundred and seven yards for another score but the referee called tripping and placed the ball back on the Pitt eleven yard line. Pitt had the ball on their forty-two yard line as time was called. West Virginia finished the season with a 5-3 record.

The Pitt starting lineup for the game against West Virginia was Homer Roe (left end), Frank Van Doren (left tackle), Samuel Elliott (left guard), Arthur Yielding (center), John Shuman (right guard), George Bailey (right tackle), Jack Lindsay (right end), Fritz Barrett (quarterback), Harry Ent (left halfback), Tex Richards (right halfback), and Joe Campbell (fullback). At some point during the game James Stevenson replaced Samuel Elliott at left guard. The game consisted of one twenty-five minute half and one twenty minute half.

=== Carlisle ===
Carlisle at Pitt

| Team | 1 | 2 | Total |
|---|---|---|---|
| • Carlisle | 0 | 6 | 6 |
| Pitt | 0 | 0 | 0 |

- Date: November 14, 1908
- Location: Exposition Park
  Pittsburgh, PA
- Game attendance: 7,000
- Referee: A. E. Whiting (U. of Pennsylvania)

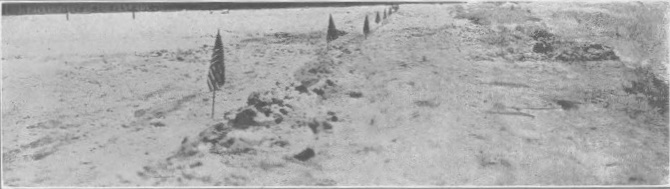
Flags used for line markers

On November 14 the marquee game of the season against the Carlisle Indians got snowed upon. Three inches of snow covered the field of play. Small American flags were used as yardage markers to assist the players and officials. Seven thousand fans ignored the cold and came to cheer for their team. The strong Carlisle team sported a 6-1-1 record. Their only loss was to Harvard the previous week. Coach Moorhead had Turner at center and Banbury at halfback in the starting lineup.

The first half was a defensive struggle with no scoring. Carlisle was deep in Pitt territory at the seventeen yard line when quarterback Kelly tried a forward pass. Pitt end Jack Lindsay intercepted and raced sixty-five yards to the Carlisle twenty-eight. Pitt would get no closer and Carlisle's Jim Thorpe punted out of danger.

On Carlisle's first possession of the second half they were able to penetrate the Pitt defense. Jim Thorpe's onside kick was recovered by Carlisle center Barrel on the Pitt eighteen yard line. Four plays later Carlisle end Little Old Man plunged into the end zone for the game's only touchdown. Jim Thorpe tacked on the point after and the score read 6-0 in favor of Carlisle. The Pitt offense thought they had a chance to tie the score when Ent recovered Barrett's onside kick on the two yard line. Referee Whiting ruled the ball had gone out of bounds and gave possession to the Indians. The other two officials disagreed to no avail. The Pittsburgh Daily Post"s headline read "Defeat of Pitt Team Charged to Referee" and Coach Moorhead's quote was "I am proud of our boys. The score should have been even, however, but the referee ruled otherwise." Carlisle finished the season with a 10-2-1 record.

The Pitt starting lineup for the game against Carlisle was Homer Roe (left end), Frank Van Doren (left tackle), Samuel Elliott (left guard), John Turner (center), John Shuman (right guard), Joe Campbell (right tackle), Jack Lindsay (right end), Fritz Barrett (quarterback), Quince Banbury (left halfback), Harry Ent (right halfback), and Tex Richards (fullback). At some point during the game Maurice Goldsmith replaced Homer Roe at left end and Arthur Yielding replaced John Turner at center. The game was played in 35-minute halves.

=== Gettysburg ===
Gettysburg at Pitt

| Team | 1 | 2 | Total |
|---|---|---|---|
| Gettysburg | 0 | 0 | 0 |
| • Pitt | 6 | 0 | 6 |

- Date: November 21, 1908
- Location: Exposition Park
  Pittsburgh, PA
- Game attendance: 1,500
- Referee: Fred R. Gillander (U. of Pennsylvania)

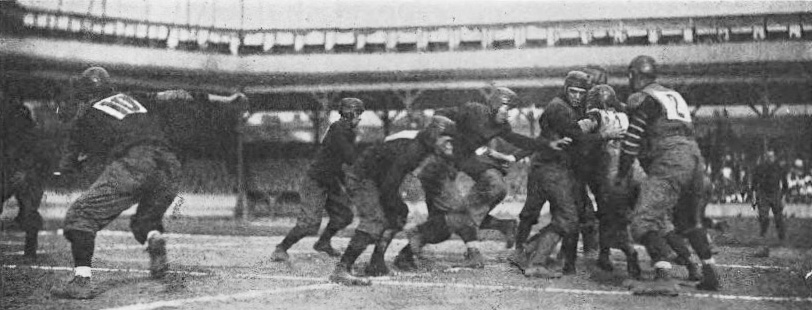
Game action

On November 22 ex-assistant Pitt coach Frank "Doc" Rugh brought his Gettysburg football team to foggy Exposition Park to square off against the Pitt eleven. The fifteen hundred faithful rooters could barely see the action. Since State College had scouts at the game, Pitt played basic football. Center Jack Turner and halfback Tex Richards were not able to play.

On Pitt's second possession their offense advanced the ball to the Gettysburg twenty yard line. Joe Campbell's fifty yard scamper was the highlight of the drive, but Pitt could not capitalize and turned the ball over on downs. Pitt's defense held and they regained possession at midfield. Fritz Barrett threw an interception and Pitt was back on defense. They regained possession at their own fifty-three yard line. Three plays later the offense had the ball on the Gettysburg fourteen yard line. Captain Banbury took the ball to the five and Joe Campbell scored on the next play. Sam Elliott converted the point after and Pitt led 6-0. Pitt had the ball on the Gettysburg twelve yard line as time ran out in the first half.

Gettysburg's offense managed to penetrate the Pitt defense in the second half. Two end runs and a successful onside kick moved the ball to the Pitt ten yard line. Gettysburg's luck ran out as Fritz Barrett recovered an onside kick. On first down Captain Quince Banbury raced fifty yards and the remainder of the game was played between the forty yard markers. Gettysburg finished the season with a 6-2 record.

The Pitt starting lineup for the game against the Gettysburg was Homer Roe (left end), Frank Van Doren (left tackle), Samuel Elliott (left guard), Arthur Yielding (center), John Shuman (right guard), George Bailey (right tackle), Jack Lindsay (right end), Fritz Barrett (quarterback), Quince Banbury (left halfback), Harry Ent (right halfback), and Joe Campbell (fullback). At some point during the game John Mackrell replaced Harry Ent at right halfback and then William Rosser replaced John Mackrell. The game consisted of one twenty-five minute half and one twenty minute half.

=== Penn State ===
Penn State at Pitt

| Team | 1 | 2 | Total |
|---|---|---|---|
| • Penn State | 4 | 8 | 12 |
| Pitt | 0 | 6 | 6 |

- Date: November 26, 1908
- Location: Exposition Park
  Pittsburgh, PA
- Game attendance: 9,000
- Referee: James H. Moffat (Princeton)

"The A. G. Spalding and Bros. offered a trophy to the winner of the annual Thanksgiving Day game between Pitt and Penn State. The condition was that the winner should have possession of it each year, and at the end of five years, the team having won the majority of the games, should have permanent possession."

On Thanksgiving Day Mother Nature blessed Pittsburgh with summer-like weather. Nine thousand fans took advantage and came to Exposition Park to witness the annual Pitt versus State College football game. The good news for Pitt fans was that they did not give up a touchdown. The bad news was that they still lost the game 12-6. Pitt had three problem areas the entire 1908 season. They fumbled too often; Critical players were injured; Their kicking game was suspect at best. In this game Pitt was not able to overcome these shortcomings and pull out the victory.

Halfback/kicker Vorhis was the star for State College as he was good on three field goals. The Pitt defense was awesome as they kept the Staties out of the end zone. The first half ended 4-0. Coach Moorhead made three lineup changes. Joe Campbell moved from tackle to halfback replacing the injured Tex Richards. George Bailey replaced Campbell at tackle and Norman Budd replaced Fritz Barrett at quarterback. The offense functioned better but Vorhis kicked two more field goals to extend the lead to 12-0. Finally, Pitt drove the ball seventy-two yards with Joe Campbell going the final two yards for the score. Sam Elliott kicked the point after. The remainder of the game Pitt tried to tie but could not sustain another drive. Penn State finished the season with a 5-5 record.

The Pitt starting lineup for the game against Penn State was Homer Roe (left end), Frank Van Doren (left tackle), Samuel Elliott (left guard), John Turner (center), John Shuman (right guard), Joe Campbell (right tackle), Jack Lindsay (right end), Fritz Barrett (quarterback), Quince Banbury (left halfback), Harry Ent (right halfback), and Tex Richards (fullback). Substitutions made during the game were: Norman Budd replaced Fritz Barrett at quarterback; George Bailey replaced Joe Campbell at right tackle; Joe Campbell replaced Tex Richards at fullback; James Stevenson replaced John Shuman at right guard; William Rosser replaced Harry Ent at right halfback; Arthur Yielding replaced James Stevenson at right guard; Maurice Goldsmith replaced Homer Roe at left end; and Charles Quailey replaced Quince Banbury at left halfback. The game was played in 35-minute halves.

=== Washington & Jefferson ===
W & J at Pitt

| Team | 1 | 2 | Total |
|---|---|---|---|
| • W & J | 6 | 8 | 14 |
| Pitt | 0 | 0 | 0 |

- Date: December 5, 1908
- Location: Exposition Park
  Pittsburgh, PA
- Game attendance: 6,100
- Referee: Al H. Sharpe (Yale)

After completing their ten game slate, Pitt was not enamored of a post season game. This game belonged to the Red and Black. The Pittsburgh Daily Post noted: "The Wash.-Jeff. triumph was clean-cut and beyond the shadow of an excuse on the part of the vanquished gold and blue. Pittsburgh's offering presented a pitiable spectacle, and at no stage of the contest did the local eleven show any of its previous skill. They were outclassed all the way."

The Red and Black defense held the Pitt offense to five first downs. The Pitt defense did not play poorly, but their offensive fumbling put the defense in constant jeopardy. The Red and Black touchdown came in the first half after Pitt lost possession on a fumbled punt. A fake field goal gained eight yards to the Pitt seven and on second down Marshall plunged into the end zone from the four. Duffey was successful on the point after. The Red and Black spent the second half in Pitt territory and Duffey was successful on two field goals to make the final tally 14-0. The Red and Black finished the season with a 10-2-1 record.

The Pitt starting lineup for the game against Washington & Jefferson was Homer Roe (left end), Frank Van Doren (left tackle), Samuel Elliott (left guard), John Turner (center), John Shuman (right guard), George Bailey (right tackle), Jack Lindsay (right end), Fritz Barrett (quarterback), Quince Banbury (left halfback), Tex Richards (right halfback), and Joe Campbell (fullback). Substitutions made during the game were: William Rosser replaced Tex Richards at right halfback; and Norman Budd replaced Fritz Barrett at quarterback. The game was played in 35-minute halves.

== Scoring summary ==
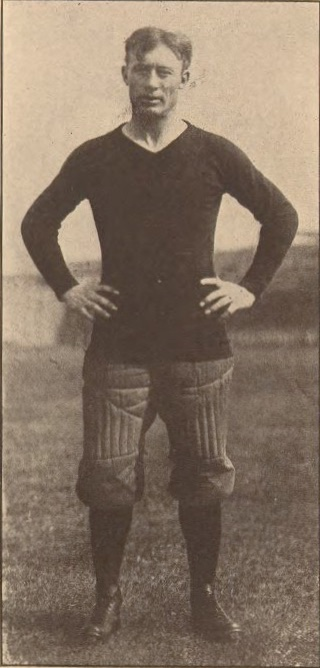
Captain Quincy Banbury

1908 Pittsburgh Panthers scoring summary
| Player | Touchdowns | Extra points | Field goals | Safety | Points |
|---|---|---|---|---|---|
| Tex Richards | 6 | 0 | 0 | 0 | 30 |
| Joe Campbell | 5 | 0 | 0 | 0 | 25 |
| Quince Banbury | 5 | 0 | 0 | 0 | 25 |
| Homer Roe | 3 | 3 | 0 | 0 | 18 |
| Jack Lindsay | 2 | 1 | 0 | 0 | 11 |
| John Mackrell | 2 | 0 | 0 | 0 | 10 |
| Charles Quailey | 1 | 0 | 0 | 0 | 5 |
| Henry Ent | 1 | 0 | 0 | 0 | 5 |
| Sam Elliott | 0 | 5 | 0 | 0 | 5 |
| Jack Turner | 0 | 2 | 0 | 0 | 2 |
| Team | 0 | 0 | 0 | 2 | 4 |
| Totals | 25 | 11 | 0 | 2 | 140 |
