= 1908 Holy Cross football team =

American college football season

1908 Holy Cross football
- Conference: Independent
- Record: 4–4
- Head coach: Timothy F. Larkin (2nd season)
- Captain: Daniel J. Triggs
- Home stadium: Fitton Field

1908 Eastern college football independents records
	Conf.			Overall
Team	W	L	T	W		L		T
Penn		–		11	–	0	–	1
Harvard		–		9	–	0	–	1
Cornell		–		7	–	1	–	1
Fordham		–		5	–	1	–	0
Yale		–		7	–	1	–	1
Dartmouth		–		6	–	1	–	1
Carlisle		–		10	–	2	–	1
Washington & Jefferson		–		10	–	2	–	1
Army		–		6	–	1	–	2
Pittsburgh		–		8	–	3	–	0
Lafayette		–		6	–	2	–	2
Princeton		–		5	–	2	–	3
Syracuse		–		6	–	3	–	1
Brown		–		5	–	3	–	1
Temple		–		3	–	2	–	1
Colgate		–		4	–	3	–	0
Lehigh		–		4	–	3	–	0
Dickinson		–		5	–	4	–	0
Amherst		–		3	–	3	–	2
Holy Cross		–		4	–	4	–	0
Penn State		–		5	–	5	–	0
Vermont		–		3	–	3	–	3
Wesleyan		–		3	–	4	–	2
Springfield Training School		–		3	–	4	–	1
NYU		–		2	–	3	–	2
Frankin & Marshall		–		4	–	6	–	1
Bucknell		–		3	–	5	–	2
Rutgers		–		3	–	5	–	1
Boston College		–		2	–	4	–	2
Carnegie Tech		–		3	–	7	–	0
Geneva		–		1	–	6	–	2
Tufts		–		1	–	6	–	1
Villanova		–		1	–	6	–	0
New Hampshire		–		1	–	7	–	0
Drexel		–		0	–	7	–	0

The 1908 Holy Cross football team was an American football team that represented the College of the Holy Cross in the 1908 college football season.

In their second year under head coach Timothy F. Larkin, the team compiled a 4–4 record. Daniel J. Triggs was the team captain.

After three years of sharing its home field with the college's baseball team, Holy Cross' football team moved its home games to a new stadium, also called Fitton Field, beyond the baseball team's right-field fence.

Mayor James Logan was present to blow the first whistle at the September 25 debut of the new football stadium on the college campus in Worcester, Massachusetts.

== Schedule ==
Date	Opponent	Site	Result	Attendance	Source
September 25	Norwich	Fitton Field; Worcester, MA	W 5–0	600	
October 3	at Vermont	Centennial Field; Burlington, VT	L 0–5	1,500	
October 10	at Yale	Yale Field; New Haven, CT	L 0–18	7,000	
October 17	at Bowdoin	Portland, ME	W 12–5		
October 24	Dartmouth	Fitton Field; Worcester, MA	L 5–18	5,000	
October 31	at Trinity (CT)	Trinity Field; Hartford, CT	L 0–28		
November 7	Tufts	Fitton Field; Worcester, MA	W 6–0		
November 14	Worcester Tech	Fitton Field; Worcester, MA	W 16–0		
