= 1908 Harvard Crimson football team =

American college football season

1908 Harvard Crimson football
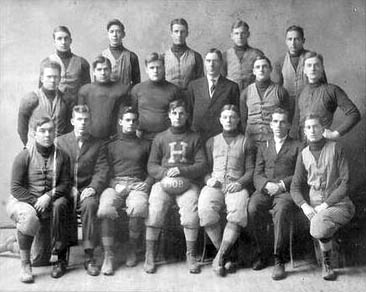

National champion (Billingsley)
- Conference: Independent
- Record: 9–0–1
- Head coach: Percy Haughton (1st season)
- Home stadium: Harvard Stadium

1908 Eastern college football independents records
	Conf.			Overall
Team	W	L	T	W		L		T
Penn		–		11	–	0	–	1
Harvard		–		9	–	0	–	1
Cornell		–		7	–	1	–	1
Fordham		–		5	–	1	–	0
Yale		–		7	–	1	–	1
Dartmouth		–		6	–	1	–	1
Carlisle		–		10	–	2	–	1
Washington & Jefferson		–		10	–	2	–	1
Army		–		6	–	1	–	2
Pittsburgh		–		8	–	3	–	0
Lafayette		–		6	–	2	–	2
Princeton		–		5	–	2	–	3
Syracuse		–		6	–	3	–	1
Brown		–		5	–	3	–	1
Temple		–		3	–	2	–	1
Colgate		–		4	–	3	–	0
Lehigh		–		4	–	3	–	0
Dickinson		–		5	–	4	–	0
Amherst		–		3	–	3	–	2
Holy Cross		–		4	–	4	–	0
Penn State		–		5	–	5	–	0
Vermont		–		3	–	3	–	3
Wesleyan		–		3	–	4	–	2
Springfield Training School		–		3	–	4	–	1
NYU		–		2	–	3	–	2
Frankin & Marshall		–		4	–	6	–	1
Bucknell		–		3	–	5	–	2
Rutgers		–		3	–	5	–	1
Boston College		–		2	–	4	–	2
Carnegie Tech		–		3	–	7	–	0
Geneva		–		1	–	6	–	2
Tufts		–		1	–	6	–	1
Villanova		–		1	–	6	–	0
New Hampshire		–		1	–	7	–	0
Drexel		–		0	–	7	–	0

The 1908 Harvard Crimson football team was an American football team that represented Harvard University as an independent during the 1908 college football season. In their first season under head coach Percy Haughton, the Crimson finished with a 9–0–1 record, shut out eight of ten opponents, and outscored all opponents by a total of 132 to 8.

There were no polls at the time to determine a national championship. However, in later analyses, Harvard was recognized as the 1908 national champion by the Billingsley Report. Most of the later analyses (Helms Athletic Foundation, Houlgate System, Parke H. Davis) designated Penn as the national champion. The National Championship Foundation chose Penn and LSU as co-national champions.

Three Harvard players were consensus first-team picks on the 1908 All-America college football team: halfback Hamilton Corbett; center Charles Nourse; and tackle Hamilton Fish III. Five other Harvard players also received All-American honors: quarterback Johnny Cutler (first-team honors from The New York Times and The Christian Science Monitor, second-team from Walter Camp); halfback Ernest Ver Wiebe (first-team honors from The Christian Science Monitor, second-team from Camp); end Gilbert Goodwin Browne (first-team honors from Philadelphia Press); tackle Robert McKay (first-team from The Christian Science Monitor); and guard Samuel Hoar (first-team from New York World, Tad Jones, and Philadelphia Press).

== Schedule ==
Date	Time	Opponent	Site	Result	Attendance	Source
September 30		Bowdoin	Harvard Stadium; Boston, MA	W 5–0		
October 3		Maine	Harvard Stadium; Boston, MA	W 16–0	> 10,000	
October 7		Bates	Harvard Stadium; Boston, MA	W 18–0		
October 10		Williams	Harvard Stadium; Boston, MA	W 10–0	12,000–15,000	
October 17	3:00 p.m.	Springfield Training School	Harvard Stadium; Boston, MA	W 44–0	15,000	
October 24		at Navy	Worden Field; Annapolis, MD	T 6–6	8,000	
October 31		Brown	Harvard Stadium; Boston, MA	W 6–2	17,000	
November 7		Carlisle	Harvard Stadium; Boston, MA	W 17–0	> 25,000	
November 14		Dartmouth	Harvard Stadium; Boston, MA (rivalry)	W 6–0	35,000	
November 21		at Yale	Yale Field; New Haven, CT (rivalry)	W 4–0		

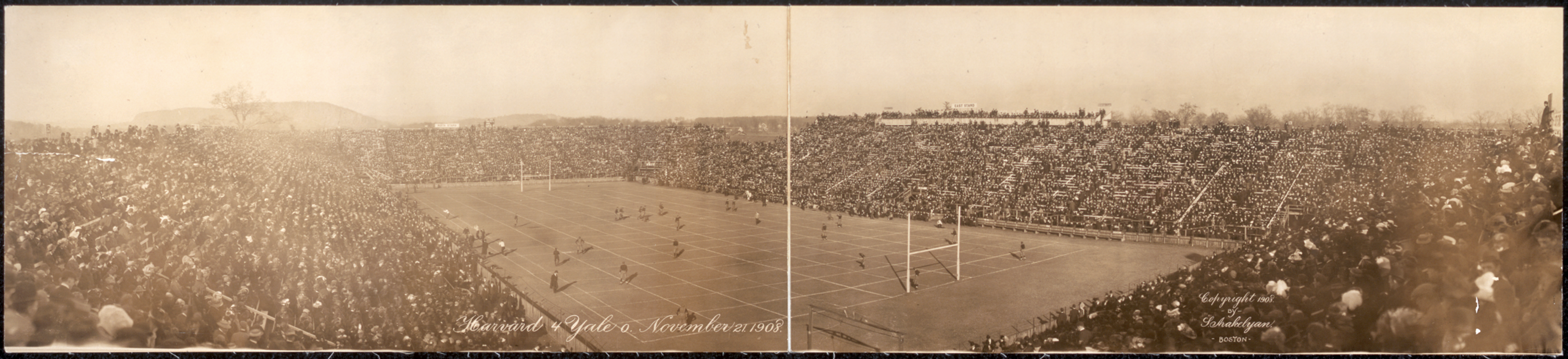
Harvard shut out Yale, 4-0.
