= 1908 Brown Bears football team =

American college football season

1908 Brown Bears football
- Conference: Independent
- Record: 5–3–1
- Head coach: J. A. Gammons (2nd season)
- Home stadium: Andrews Field

1908 Eastern college football independents records
	Conf.			Overall
Team	W	L	T	W		L		T
Penn		–		11	–	0	–	1
Harvard		–		9	–	0	–	1
Cornell		–		7	–	1	–	1
Fordham		–		5	–	1	–	0
Yale		–		7	–	1	–	1
Dartmouth		–		6	–	1	–	1
Carlisle		–		10	–	2	–	1
Washington & Jefferson		–		10	–	2	–	1
Army		–		6	–	1	–	2
Pittsburgh		–		8	–	3	–	0
Lafayette		–		6	–	2	–	2
Princeton		–		5	–	2	–	3
Syracuse		–		6	–	3	–	1
Brown		–		5	–	3	–	1
Temple		–		3	–	2	–	1
Colgate		–		4	–	3	–	0
Lehigh		–		4	–	3	–	0
Dickinson		–		5	–	4	–	0
Amherst		–		3	–	3	–	2
Holy Cross		–		4	–	4	–	0
Penn State		–		5	–	5	–	0
Vermont		–		3	–	3	–	3
Wesleyan		–		3	–	4	–	2
Springfield Training School		–		3	–	4	–	1
NYU		–		2	–	3	–	2
Franklin & Marshall		–		4	–	6	–	1
Bucknell		–		3	–	5	–	2
Rutgers		–		3	–	5	–	1
Boston College		–		2	–	4	–	2
Carnegie Tech		–		3	–	7	–	0
Geneva		–		1	–	6	–	2
Tufts		–		1	–	6	–	1
Villanova		–		1	–	6	–	0
New Hampshire		–		1	–	7	–	0
Drexel		–		0	–	7	–	0

The 1908 Brown Bears football team represented Brown University as an independent during the 1908 college football season. Led by second-year head coach J. A. Gammons, Brown compiled a record of 5–3–1.

== Schedule ==
Date	Opponent	Site	Result	Attendance	Source
September 19	New Hampshire	Andrews Field; Providence, RI	W 34–0		
September 26	Bates	Andrews Field; Providence, RI	W 35–4		
October 3	Colgate	Andrews Field; Providence, RI	W 6–0		
October 10	Bowdoin	Andrews Field; Providence, RI	W 12–0		
October 17	at Penn	Franklin Field; Philadelphia, PA	L 0–12	10,000	
October 24	Lafayette	Andrews Field; Providence, RI	L 6–8		
October 31	at Harvard	Harvard Stadium; Boston, MA	L 2–6		
November 7	at Yale	Yale Field; New Haven, CT	T 10–10		
November 14	Vermont	Andrews Field; Providence, RI	W 12–0		
