= 1908 Lehigh Brown and White football team =

American college football season

1908 Lehigh Brown and White football
- Conference: Independent
- Record: 4–3
- Head coach: Byron W. Dickson (3rd season)

1908 Eastern college football independents records
	Conf.			Overall
Team	W	L	T	W		L		T
Penn		–		11	–	0	–	1
Harvard		–		9	–	0	–	1
Cornell		–		7	–	1	–	1
Fordham		–		5	–	1	–	0
Yale		–		7	–	1	–	1
Dartmouth		–		6	–	1	–	1
Carlisle		–		10	–	2	–	1
Washington & Jefferson		–		10	–	2	–	1
Army		–		6	–	1	–	2
Pittsburgh		–		8	–	3	–	0
Lafayette		–		6	–	2	–	2
Princeton		–		5	–	2	–	3
Syracuse		–		6	–	3	–	1
Brown		–		5	–	3	–	1
Temple		–		3	–	2	–	1
Colgate		–		4	–	3	–	0
Lehigh		–		4	–	3	–	0
Dickinson		–		5	–	4	–	0
Amherst		–		3	–	3	–	2
Holy Cross		–		4	–	4	–	0
Penn State		–		5	–	5	–	0
Vermont		–		3	–	3	–	3
Wesleyan		–		3	–	4	–	2
Springfield Training School		–		3	–	4	–	1
NYU		–		2	–	3	–	2
Frankin & Marshall		–		4	–	6	–	1
Bucknell		–		3	–	5	–	2
Rutgers		–		3	–	5	–	1
Boston College		–		2	–	4	–	2
Carnegie Tech		–		3	–	7	–	0
Geneva		–		1	–	6	–	2
Tufts		–		1	–	6	–	1
Villanova		–		1	–	6	–	0
New Hampshire		–		1	–	7	–	0
Drexel		–		0	–	7	–	0

The 1908 Lehigh Brown and White football team was an American football team that represented Lehigh University as an independent during the 1908 college football season. In its third season under head coach Byron W. Dickson, the team compiled a 4–3 record and was outscored by a total of 50 to 45. Lehigh played home games at Lehigh Field in Bethlehem, Pennsylvania.

== Schedule ==
Date	Opponent	Site	Result
September 26	at Stevens	Hoboken, NJ	W 5–0
October 10	Rutgers	Lehigh Field; Bethlehem, PA	W 12–0
October 17	at Navy	Worden Field; Annapolis, MD	L 0–16
October 24	Haverford	Lehigh Field; Bethlehem, PA	W 9–0
October 31	Washington & Jefferson	Lehigh Field; Bethlehem, PA	L 6–18
November 7	at Ursinus	Collegeville, PA	L 2–11
November 21	at Lafayette	Easton, PA (rivalry)	W 11–5
