= 1908 Rutgers Queensmen football team =

American college football season

1908 Rutgers Queensmen football
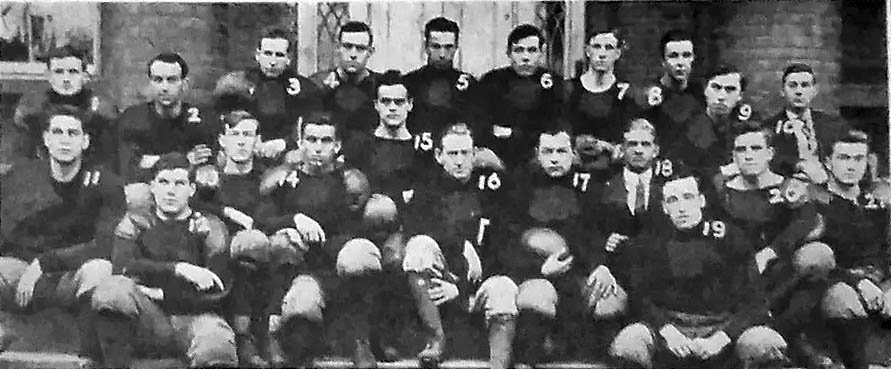
- Conference: Independent
- Record: 3–5–1
- Head coach: Joseph T. Smith (1st season)
- Captain: Charles E. Corbin
- Home stadium: Neilson Field

1908 Eastern college football independents records
	Conf.			Overall
Team	W	L	T	W		L		T
Penn		–		11	–	0	–	1
Harvard		–		9	–	0	–	1
Cornell		–		7	–	1	–	1
Fordham		–		5	–	1	–	0
Yale		–		7	–	1	–	1
Dartmouth		–		6	–	1	–	1
Carlisle		–		10	–	2	–	1
Washington & Jefferson		–		10	–	2	–	1
Army		–		6	–	1	–	2
Pittsburgh		–		8	–	3	–	0
Lafayette		–		6	–	2	–	2
Princeton		–		5	–	2	–	3
Syracuse		–		6	–	3	–	1
Brown		–		5	–	3	–	1
Temple		–		3	–	2	–	1
Colgate		–		4	–	3	–	0
Lehigh		–		4	–	3	–	0
Dickinson		–		5	–	4	–	0
Amherst		–		3	–	3	–	2
Holy Cross		–		4	–	4	–	0
Penn State		–		5	–	5	–	0
Vermont		–		3	–	3	–	3
Wesleyan		–		3	–	4	–	2
Springfield Training School		–		3	–	4	–	1
NYU		–		2	–	3	–	2
Franklin & Marshall		–		4	–	6	–	1
Bucknell		–		3	–	5	–	2
Rutgers		–		3	–	5	–	1
Boston College		–		2	–	4	–	2
Carnegie Tech		–		3	–	7	–	0
Geneva		–		1	–	6	–	2
Tufts		–		1	–	6	–	1
Villanova		–		1	–	6	–	0
New Hampshire		–		1	–	7	–	0
Drexel		–		0	–	7	–	0

The 1908 Rutgers Queensmen football team represented Rutgers University as an independent during the 1908 college football season. In their first and only season under head coach Joseph T. Smith, the Queensmen compiled a 3–5–1 record and were outscored by their opponents, 104 to 53. The team captain was Charles E. Corbin.

The Rutgers yearbook put a positive spin on the season: "The football season of 1908 turned out to be very successful, considering the poor prospects which seemed to face us before the opening of college in the fall."

== Schedule ==
Date	Opponent	Site	Result	Source
October 3	at Navy	Worden Field; Annapolis, MD	L 0–18	
October 10	at Lehigh	Lehigh Field; Bethlehem, PA	L 0–12	
October 24	at Haverford	Walton Field; Haverford, PA	L 5–9	
October 31	Hamilton	Neilson Field; New Brunswick, NJ	W 6–4	
November 3	Franklin & Marshall	Neilson Field; New Brunswick, NJ	W 9–0	
November 7	Delaware	Neilson Field; New Brunswick, NJ	T 6–6	
November 10	Ursinus	Neilson Field; New Brunswick, NJ	L 0–35	
November 14	Muhlenberg	Neilson Field; New Brunswick, NJ	W 15–5	
November 21	at Stevens	Stevens Field; Hoboken, NJ	L 13–15	

== Players ==
The following players earned varsity letters for their participation on the 1908 football team:

- James Woods Babcock, Paterson, NJ, Class of 1909
- Myron Hamilton Beekman, Rosendale, NY, Class of 1909
- Charles Eli Corbin, Oxford, NY, Class of 1909
- Allen Dale Cloke, Rahway, NJ, Class of 1909
- Samuel S. Demarest, Bergenfield, NJ, Class of 1909
- Frederick Foster Read, Arlington, NJ, Class of 1909
- F. Rudolph Steinke, Elizabeth, NJ, Class of 1909
- William Henry Wallace, Moorestown, NJ, Class of 1909
- Booz, Class of 1910
- Thomas Laughlin Hanson, Class of 1910
- Edwin Thomas Leslie, Class of 1910
- Arthur Thomas McMichael, Class of 1910
- E. T. Goode 1911
- Rogers 1911
- H. A. Smith 1911
- Alverson 1912
- Carpender 1912
- H. C. Cooper 1912
- Freystadt 1912
