= 1908 Lafayette football team =

American college football season

1908 Lafayette football
- Conference: Independent
- Record: 6–2–2
- Head coach: George Barclay (1st season)
- Captain: George McCaa
- Home stadium: March Field

1908 Eastern college football independents records
	Conf.			Overall
Team	W	L	T	W		L		T
Penn		–		11	–	0	–	1
Harvard		–		9	–	0	–	1
Cornell		–		7	–	1	–	1
Fordham		–		5	–	1	–	0
Yale		–		7	–	1	–	1
Dartmouth		–		6	–	1	–	1
Carlisle		–		10	–	2	–	1
Washington & Jefferson		–		10	–	2	–	1
Army		–		6	–	1	–	2
Pittsburgh		–		8	–	3	–	0
Lafayette		–		6	–	2	–	2
Princeton		–		5	–	2	–	3
Syracuse		–		6	–	3	–	1
Brown		–		5	–	3	–	1
Temple		–		3	–	2	–	1
Colgate		–		4	–	3	–	0
Lehigh		–		4	–	3	–	0
Dickinson		–		5	–	4	–	0
Amherst		–		3	–	3	–	2
Holy Cross		–		4	–	4	–	0
Penn State		–		5	–	5	–	0
Vermont		–		3	–	3	–	3
Wesleyan		–		3	–	4	–	2
Springfield Training School		–		3	–	4	–	1
NYU		–		2	–	3	–	2
Franklin & Marshall		–		4	–	6	–	1
Bucknell		–		3	–	5	–	2
Rutgers		–		3	–	5	–	1
Boston College		–		2	–	4	–	2
Carnegie Tech		–		3	–	7	–	0
Geneva		–		1	–	6	–	2
Tufts		–		1	–	6	–	1
Villanova		–		1	–	6	–	0
New Hampshire		–		1	–	7	–	0
Drexel		–		0	–	7	–	0

The 1908 Lafayette football team was an American football team that represented Lafayette College as an independent during the 1908 college football season. In its first and only season under head coach George Barclay, the team compiled a 6–2–2 record, shut out six opponents, and outscored all opponents by a total of 102 to 57. George McCaa was the team captain. The team played its home games at March Field in Easton, Pennsylvania.

== Schedule ==
Date	Opponent	Site	Result	Source
September 26	Wyoming Seminary	March Field; Easton, PA	W 10–0	
October 3	Stroudsburg Normal	March Field; Easton, PA	W 22–0	
October 7	Superba Athletic Club	March Field; Easton, PA	W 12–0	
October 10	at Princeton	University Field; Princeton, NJ	T 0–0	
October 17	Medico-Chirurgical	March Field; Easton, PA	W 23–0	
October 24	at Brown	Andrews Field; Providence, RI	W 8–6	
October 31	Bucknell	March Field; Easton, PA	T 6–6	
November 7	at Penn	Franklin Field; Philadelphia PA	L 4–34	
November 21	Lehigh	Easton, PA	L 5–11	
November 26	Dickinson	Easton, PA	W 12–0	
