= 1908 Carlisle Indians football team =

American college football season

1908 Carlisle Indians football
- Conference: Independent
- Record: 10–2–1
- Head coach: Pop Warner (7th season)
- Offensive scheme: Single-wing
- Captain: Wauseka
- Home stadium: Indian Field

1908 Eastern college football independents records
	Conf.			Overall
Team	W	L	T	W		L		T
Penn		–		11	–	0	–	1
Harvard		–		9	–	0	–	1
Cornell		–		7	–	1	–	1
Fordham		–		5	–	1	–	0
Yale		–		7	–	1	–	1
Dartmouth		–		6	–	1	–	1
Carlisle		–		10	–	2	–	1
Washington & Jefferson		–		10	–	2	–	1
Army		–		6	–	1	–	2
Pittsburgh		–		8	–	3	–	0
Lafayette		–		6	–	2	–	2
Princeton		–		5	–	2	–	3
Syracuse		–		6	–	3	–	1
Brown		–		5	–	3	–	1
Temple		–		3	–	2	–	1
Colgate		–		4	–	3	–	0
Lehigh		–		4	–	3	–	0
Dickinson		–		5	–	4	–	0
Amherst		–		3	–	3	–	2
Holy Cross		–		4	–	4	–	0
Penn State		–		5	–	5	–	0
Vermont		–		3	–	3	–	3
Wesleyan		–		3	–	4	–	2
Springfield Training School		–		3	–	4	–	1
NYU		–		2	–	3	–	2
Franklin & Marshall		–		4	–	6	–	1
Bucknell		–		3	–	5	–	2
Rutgers		–		3	–	5	–	1
Boston College		–		2	–	4	–	2
Carnegie Tech		–		3	–	7	–	0
Geneva		–		1	–	6	–	2
Tufts		–		1	–	6	–	1
Villanova		–		1	–	6	–	0
New Hampshire		–		1	–	7	–	0
Drexel		–		0	–	7	–	0

The 1908 Carlisle Indians football team represented the Carlisle Indian Industrial School as an independent during the 1908 college football season. Led by seventh-year head coach Pop Warner, the Indians compiled a record of 10–2–1 and outscored opponents 222 to 55. Warner's team ran the single-wing on offense.

This team featured legendary back Jim Thorpe.

== Schedule ==
Date	Time	Opponent	Site	Result	Attendance	Source
September 19		Conway Hall	Carlisle, PA	W 53–0		
September 23		Lebanon Valley	Carlisle, PA	W 39–0		
September 26		Villanova	Indian Field; Carlisle, PA	W 10–0		
October 3		vs. Penn State	Driving Park; Wilkes-Barre, PA	W 12–5	10,000	
October 10		vs. Syracuse	Olympic Park; Buffalo, NY	W 12–0	8,000	
October 24		at Penn	Franklin Field; Philadelphia, PA	T 6–6	25,000	
October 31		at Navy	Worden Field; Annapolis, MD	W 16–6		
November 7		at Harvard	Harvard Stadium; Boston, MA	L 0–17	> 25,000	
November 14		at Pittsburgh	Exposition Park; Pittsburgh, PA	W 6–0	7,000	
November 21		at Minnesota	Northrop Field; Minneapolis, MN	L 6–11	15,000	
November 26	2:00 p.m.	at Saint Louis	Sportsman's Park; St. Louis, MO	W 17–0		
December 2	2:30 p.m.	at Nebraska	Antelope Field; Lincoln, NE	W 37–6	2,000	
December 5	2:39 p.m.	at Denver	Denver, CO	W 8–4		

== See also ==
- 1908 College Football All-America Team
