= 1908 Penn Quakers football team =

American college football season

1908 Penn Quakers football

National champion (Helms, Houlgate, Davis) Co-national champion (NCF)
- Conference: Independent
- Record: 11–0–1
- Head coach: Sol Metzger (1st season)
- Captain: Bill Hollenback
- Home stadium: Franklin Field

1908 Eastern college football independents records
	Conf.			Overall
Team	W	L	T	W		L		T
Penn		–		11	–	0	–	1
Harvard		–		9	–	0	–	1
Cornell		–		7	–	1	–	1
Fordham		–		5	–	1	–	0
Yale		–		7	–	1	–	1
Dartmouth		–		6	–	1	–	1
Carlisle		–		10	–	2	–	1
Washington & Jefferson		–		10	–	2	–	1
Army		–		6	–	1	–	2
Pittsburgh		–		8	–	3	–	0
Lafayette		–		6	–	2	–	2
Princeton		–		5	–	2	–	3
Syracuse		–		6	–	3	–	1
Brown		–		5	–	3	–	1
Temple		–		3	–	2	–	1
Colgate		–		4	–	3	–	0
Lehigh		–		4	–	3	–	0
Dickinson		–		5	–	4	–	0
Amherst		–		3	–	3	–	2
Holy Cross		–		4	–	4	–	0
Penn State		–		5	–	5	–	0
Vermont		–		3	–	3	–	3
Wesleyan		–		3	–	4	–	2
Springfield Training School		–		3	–	4	–	1
NYU		–		2	–	3	–	2
Franklin & Marshall		–		4	–	6	–	1
Bucknell		–		3	–	5	–	2
Rutgers		–		3	–	5	–	1
Boston College		–		2	–	4	–	2
Carnegie Tech		–		3	–	7	–	0
Geneva		–		1	–	6	–	2
Tufts		–		1	–	6	–	1
Villanova		–		1	–	6	–	0
New Hampshire		–		1	–	7	–	0
Drexel		–		0	–	7	–	0

The 1908 Penn Quakers football team was an American football team that represented the University of Pennsylvania as an independent during the 1908 college football season. In their first season under head coach Sol Metzger, the Quakers compiled an 11–0–1 record, shut out seven of twelve opponents, and outscored all opponents by a total of 215 to 28.

There was no contemporaneous system in 1908 for determining a national champion. However, Penn was retroactively named as the national champion by the Helms Athletic Foundation, Houlgate System, and Parke H. Davis, and as a co-national champion by the National Championship Foundation.

Two Penn players, halfback Bill Hollenback and end Hunter Scarlett, were consensus picks on the 1908 All-America college football team. Both were later inducted into the College Football Hall of Fame, Hollenback in 1951 and Scarlett in 1970. Other notable players included quarterback Allie Miller and tackle Dexter Draper.

== Schedule ==
Date	Opponent	Site	Result	Attendance	Source
September 26	West Virginia	Franklin Field; Philadelphia, PA	W 6–0		
September 30	Ursinus	Franklin Field; Philadelphia, PA	W 30–0		
October 3	Bucknell	Franklin Field; Philadelphia, PA	W 16–0		
October 7	Villanova	Franklin Field; Philadelphia, PA	W 11–0		
October 10	Penn State	Franklin Field; Philadelphia, PA	W 6–0	7,000	
October 14	Gettysburg	Franklin Field; Philadelphia, PA	W 23–4		
October 17	Brown	Franklin Field; Philadelphia, PA	W 12–0	10,000	
October 24	Carlisle	Franklin Field; Philadelphia, PA	T 6–6	25,000	
October 31	at Carnegie Tech	Tech Park; Pittsburgh, PA	W 25–10	6,500	
November 7	Lafayette	Franklin Field; Philadelphia, PA	W 34–4		
November 14	at Michigan	Ferry Field; Ann Arbor, MI	W 29–0		
November 26	Cornell	Franklin Field; Philadelphia, PA (rivalry)	W 17–4		
