= 1908 Cornell Big Red football team =

American college football season

1908 Cornell Big Red football
- Conference: Independent
- Record: 7–1–1
- Head coach: Henry Schoellkopf (2nd season)
- Captain: George Walder
- Home stadium: Percy Field

1908 Eastern college football independents records
	Conf.			Overall
Team	W	L	T	W		L		T
Penn		–		11	–	0	–	1
Harvard		–		9	–	0	–	1
Cornell		–		7	–	1	–	1
Fordham		–		5	–	1	–	0
Yale		–		7	–	1	–	1
Dartmouth		–		6	–	1	–	1
Carlisle		–		10	–	2	–	1
Washington & Jefferson		–		10	–	2	–	1
Army		–		6	–	1	–	2
Pittsburgh		–		8	–	3	–	0
Lafayette		–		6	–	2	–	2
Princeton		–		5	–	2	–	3
Syracuse		–		6	–	3	–	1
Brown		–		5	–	3	–	1
Temple		–		3	–	2	–	1
Colgate		–		4	–	3	–	0
Lehigh		–		4	–	3	–	0
Dickinson		–		5	–	4	–	0
Amherst		–		3	–	3	–	2
Holy Cross		–		4	–	4	–	0
Penn State		–		5	–	5	–	0
Vermont		–		3	–	3	–	3
Wesleyan		–		3	–	4	–	2
Springfield Training School		–		3	–	4	–	1
NYU		–		2	–	3	–	2
Franklin & Marshall		–		4	–	6	–	1
Bucknell		–		3	–	5	–	2
Rutgers		–		3	–	5	–	1
Boston College		–		2	–	4	–	2
Carnegie Tech		–		3	–	7	–	0
Geneva		–		1	–	6	–	2
Tufts		–		1	–	6	–	1
Villanova		–		1	–	6	–	0
New Hampshire		–		1	–	7	–	0
Drexel		–		0	–	7	–	0

The 1908 Cornell Big Red football team represented Cornell University in the 1908 college football season.

== Schedule ==
Date	Opponent	Site	Result	Source
October 3	Hamilton	Percy Field; Ithaca, NY	W 11–0	
October 10	Oberlin	Percy Field; Ithaca, NY	W 23–10	
October 17	Colgate	Percy Field; Ithaca, NY (rivalry)	W 9–0	
October 24	Vermont	Percy Field; Ithaca, NY	W 9–0	
October 31	Penn State	Percy Field; Ithaca, NY	W 10–4	
November 7	at Amherst	Percy Field; Ithaca, NY	W 6–0	
November 14	at Chicago	Marshall Field; Chicago, IL	T 6–6	
November 21	Trinity (CT)	Percy Field; Ithaca, NY	W 18–6	
November 26	at Penn	Franklin Field; Philadelphia, PA (rivalry)	L 4–17	
