= 1908 Carnegie Tech Tartans football team =

American college football season

1908 Carnegie Tech Tartans football
- Conference: Independent
- Record: 3–7
- Head coach: William F. Knox (1st season)
- Captain: Winks Dowling
- Home stadium: Tech Park

1908 Eastern college football independents records
| | Conf. | | | Overall |
| Team | W | L | T | W | | L | | T |
|---|---|---|---|---|---|---|---|---|
| Penn | | – | | 11 | – | 0 | – | 1 |
| Harvard | | – | | 9 | – | 0 | – | 1 |
| Cornell | | – | | 7 | – | 1 | – | 1 |
| Fordham | | – | | 5 | – | 1 | – | 0 |
| Yale | | – | | 7 | – | 1 | – | 1 |
| Dartmouth | | – | | 6 | – | 1 | – | 1 |
| Carlisle | | – | | 10 | – | 2 | – | 1 |
| Washington & Jefferson | | – | | 10 | – | 2 | – | 1 |
| Army | | – | | 6 | – | 1 | – | 2 |
| Pittsburgh | | – | | 8 | – | 3 | – | 0 |
| Lafayette | | – | | 6 | – | 2 | – | 2 |
| Princeton | | – | | 5 | – | 2 | – | 3 |
| Syracuse | | – | | 6 | – | 3 | – | 1 |
| Brown | | – | | 5 | – | 3 | – | 1 |
| Temple | | – | | 3 | – | 2 | – | 1 |
| Colgate | | – | | 4 | – | 3 | – | 0 |
| Lehigh | | – | | 4 | – | 3 | – | 0 |
| Dickinson | | – | | 5 | – | 4 | – | 0 |
| Amherst | | – | | 3 | – | 3 | – | 2 |
| Holy Cross | | – | | 4 | – | 4 | – | 0 |
| Penn State | | – | | 5 | – | 5 | – | 0 |
| Vermont | | – | | 3 | – | 3 | – | 3 |
| Wesleyan | | – | | 3 | – | 4 | – | 2 |
| Springfield Training School | | – | | 3 | – | 4 | – | 1 |
| NYU | | – | | 2 | – | 3 | – | 2 |
| Franklin & Marshall | | – | | 4 | – | 6 | – | 1 |
| Bucknell | | – | | 3 | – | 5 | – | 2 |
| Rutgers | | – | | 3 | – | 5 | – | 1 |
| Boston College | | – | | 2 | – | 4 | – | 2 |
| Carnegie Tech | | – | | 3 | – | 7 | – | 0 |
| Geneva | | – | | 1 | – | 6 | – | 2 |
| Tufts | | – | | 1 | – | 6 | – | 1 |
| Villanova | | – | | 1 | – | 6 | – | 0 |
| New Hampshire | | – | | 1 | – | 7 | – | 0 |
| Drexel | | – | | 0 | – | 7 | – | 0 |

The 1908 Carnegie Tech Tartans football team represented the Carnegie Institute of Technology—now known as Carnegie Mellon University—as an independent during the 1908 college football season. Led by William F. Knox in his first and only season as head coach, Carnegie Tech compiled a record of 3–7.

== Schedule ==
| Date | Time | Opponent | Site | Result | Attendance | Source |
|---|---|---|---|---|---|---|
| October 3 | | Waynesburg | Tech Park; Pittsburgh, PA | W 12–0 | 1,500 | |
| October 10 | | Grove City | Tech Park; Pittsburgh, PA | W 6–4 | | |
| October 17 | 3:00 p.m. | West Virginia | Tech Park; Pittsburgh, PA | L 0–16 | | |
| October 24 | 3:00 p.m. | Allegheny | Tech Park; Pittsburgh, PA | W 11–0 | | |
| October 31 | 3:00 p.m. | Penn | Tech Park; Pittsburgh, PA | L 0–25 | 6,000 | |
| November 3 | 3:00 p.m. | at Pittsburgh | Exposition Park; Pittsburgh, PA | L 0–22 | | |
| November 7 | 3:00 p.m. | Wooster | Tech Park; Pittsburgh, PA | L 6–13 | | |
| November 14 | | at Marietta | Marietta, OH | L 0–27 | | |
| November 21 | 3:00 p.m. | Case | Tech Park; Pittsburgh, PA | L 0–30 | | |
| November 26 | 3:00 p.m. | Washington & Jefferson | Tech Park; Pittsburgh, PA | L 0–30 | | |
