= 1908 Syracuse Orangemen football team =

American college football season

1908 Syracuse Orangemen football
- Conference: Independent
- Record: 6–3–1
- Head coach: Howard Jones (1st season)
- Captain: Bill Horr
- Home stadium: Archbold Stadium

1908 Eastern college football independents records
	Conf.			Overall
Team	W	L	T	W		L		T
Penn		–		11	–	0	–	1
Harvard		–		9	–	0	–	1
Cornell		–		7	–	1	–	1
Fordham		–		5	–	1	–	0
Yale		–		7	–	1	–	1
Dartmouth		–		6	–	1	–	1
Carlisle		–		10	–	2	–	1
Washington & Jefferson		–		10	–	2	–	1
Army		–		6	–	1	–	2
Pittsburgh		–		8	–	3	–	0
Lafayette		–		6	–	2	–	2
Princeton		–		5	–	2	–	3
Syracuse		–		6	–	3	–	1
Brown		–		5	–	3	–	1
Temple		–		3	–	2	–	1
Colgate		–		4	–	3	–	0
Lehigh		–		4	–	3	–	0
Dickinson		–		5	–	4	–	0
Amherst		–		3	–	3	–	2
Holy Cross		–		4	–	4	–	0
Penn State		–		5	–	5	–	0
Vermont		–		3	–	3	–	3
Wesleyan		–		3	–	4	–	2
Springfield Training School		–		3	–	4	–	1
NYU		–		2	–	3	–	2
Franklin & Marshall		–		4	–	6	–	1
Bucknell		–		3	–	5	–	2
Rutgers		–		3	–	5	–	1
Boston College		–		2	–	4	–	2
Carnegie Tech		–		3	–	7	–	0
Geneva		–		1	–	6	–	2
Tufts		–		1	–	6	–	1
Villanova		–		1	–	6	–	0
New Hampshire		–		1	–	7	–	0
Drexel		–		0	–	7	–	0

The 1908 Syracuse Orangemen football team represented Syracuse University as an independent during the 1908 college football season. The team was coached by first-year head coach Howard Jones.

== Schedule ==
Date	Opponent	Site	Result	Attendance	Source
September 23	Hobart	Archbold Stadium; Syracuse, NY	W 51–0		
September 26	Hamilton	Archbold Stadium; Syracuse, NY	W 18–0		
October 3	at Yale	Yale Field; New Haven, CT	L 0–5		
October 10	vs. Carlisle	Olympic Park; Buffalo, NY	L 0–12	8,000	
October 17	Rochester	Archbold Stadium; Syracuse, NY	W 23–12		
October 25	at Princeton	University Field; Princeton, NJ	T 0–0		
October 31	Williams	Archbold Stadium; Syracuse, NY	W 23–0		
November 7	Colgate	Archbold Stadium; Syracuse, NY	L 0–6		
November 14	Tufts	Archbold Stadium; Syracuse, NY	W 28–0		
November 21	Michigan	Archbold Stadium; Syracuse, NY	W 28–4		
