= 1908 NYU Violets football team =

American college football season

1908 NYU Violets football
- Conference: Independent
- Record: 2–3–2
- Head coach: Herman Olcott (2nd season)
- Home stadium: Ohio Field

1908 Eastern college football independents records
	Conf.			Overall
Team	W	L	T	W		L		T
Penn		–		11	–	0	–	1
Harvard		–		9	–	0	–	1
Cornell		–		7	–	1	–	1
Fordham		–		5	–	1	–	0
Yale		–		7	–	1	–	1
Dartmouth		–		6	–	1	–	1
Carlisle		–		10	–	2	–	1
Washington & Jefferson		–		10	–	2	–	1
Army		–		6	–	1	–	2
Pittsburgh		–		8	–	3	–	0
Lafayette		–		6	–	2	–	2
Princeton		–		5	–	2	–	3
Syracuse		–		6	–	3	–	1
Brown		–		5	–	3	–	1
Temple		–		3	–	2	–	1
Colgate		–		4	–	3	–	0
Lehigh		–		4	–	3	–	0
Dickinson		–		5	–	4	–	0
Amherst		–		3	–	3	–	2
Holy Cross		–		4	–	4	–	0
Penn State		–		5	–	5	–	0
Vermont		–		3	–	3	–	3
Wesleyan		–		3	–	4	–	2
Springfield Training School		–		3	–	4	–	1
NYU		–		2	–	3	–	2
Franklin & Marshall		–		4	–	6	–	1
Bucknell		–		3	–	5	–	2
Rutgers		–		3	–	5	–	1
Boston College		–		2	–	4	–	2
Carnegie Tech		–		3	–	7	–	0
Geneva		–		1	–	6	–	2
Tufts		–		1	–	6	–	1
Villanova		–		1	–	6	–	0
New Hampshire		–		1	–	7	–	0
Drexel		–		0	–	7	–	0

The 1908 NYU Violets football team was an American football team that represented New York University as an independent during the 1908 college football season. In their second year under head coach Herman Olcott, the team compiled a 2–3–2 record.

== Schedule ==
=== Regular season ===
Date	Opponent	Site	Result	Attendance	Source
October 3	St. Stephen's	Ohio Field; Bronx, NY	W 5–0		
October 10	Stevens	Ohio Field; Bronx, NY	L 5–6		
October 17	at Trinity (CT)	Trinity Field; Hartford, CT	L 4–18		
November 3	Wesleyan	Ohio Field; Bronx, NY	T 0–0	5,000	
November 7	at RPI	Troy, NY	L 0–11		
November 14	Union (NY)	Ohio Field; Bronx, NY	T 5–5		
November 21	at Haverford	Haverford, PA	W 8–5		

=== Scrimmage games ===
Date	Opponent	Site	Result	Source
October 7	Webb Academy	Ohio Field; Bronx, NY	T 0–0	
October 15	NYU Scrubs	Ohio Field; Bronx, NY	T 0–0	
November 18	NYU Sophomores	Ohio Field; Bronx, NY	W 10–0	
