= 1908 Yale Bulldogs football team =

American college football season

1908 Yale Bulldogs football
- Conference: Independent
- Record: 7–1–1
- Head coach: Lucius Horatio Biglow (1st season)
- Captain: Robert Burch
- Home stadium: Yale Field

1908 Eastern college football independents records
	Conf.			Overall
Team	W	L	T	W		L		T
Penn		–		11	–	0	–	1
Harvard		–		9	–	0	–	1
Cornell		–		7	–	1	–	1
Fordham		–		5	–	1	–	0
Yale		–		7	–	1	–	1
Dartmouth		–		6	–	1	–	1
Carlisle		–		10	–	2	–	1
Washington & Jefferson		–		10	–	2	–	1
Army		–		6	–	1	–	2
Pittsburgh		–		8	–	3	–	0
Lafayette		–		6	–	2	–	2
Princeton		–		5	–	2	–	3
Syracuse		–		6	–	3	–	1
Brown		–		5	–	3	–	1
Temple		–		3	–	2	–	1
Colgate		–		4	–	3	–	0
Lehigh		–		4	–	3	–	0
Dickinson		–		5	–	4	–	0
Amherst		–		3	–	3	–	2
Holy Cross		–		4	–	4	–	0
Penn State		–		5	–	5	–	0
Vermont		–		3	–	3	–	3
Wesleyan		–		3	–	4	–	2
Springfield Training School		–		3	–	4	–	1
NYU		–		2	–	3	–	2
Franklin & Marshall		–		4	–	6	–	1
Bucknell		–		3	–	5	–	2
Rutgers		–		3	–	5	–	1
Boston College		–		2	–	4	–	2
Carnegie Tech		–		3	–	7	–	0
Geneva		–		1	–	6	–	2
Tufts		–		1	–	6	–	1
Villanova		–		1	–	6	–	0
New Hampshire		–		1	–	7	–	0
Drexel		–		0	–	7	–	0

The 1908 Yale Bulldogs football team represented Yale University in the 1908 college football season. The Bulldogs finished with a 7–1–1 record under first-year head coach Lucius Horatio Biglow.

Three Yale players, fullback Ted Coy and guards Hamlin Andrus and William Goebel, were consensus picks for the 1908 College Football All-America Team.

== Schedule ==
Date	Opponent	Site	Result	Source
September 30	Wesleyan	Yale Field; New Haven, CT	W 16–0	
October 3	Syracuse	Yale Field; New Haven, CT	W 5–0	
October 10	Holy Cross	Yale Field; New Haven, CT	W 18–0	
October 17	at Army	The Plain; West Point, NY	W 6–0	
October 24	Washington & Jefferson	Yale Field; New Haven, CT	W 38–0	
October 31	Massachusetts	Yale Field; New Haven, CT	W 49–0	
November 7	Brown	Yale Field; New Haven, CT	T 10–10	
November 14	at Princeton	University Field; Princeton, NJ (rivalry)	W 11–6	
November 21	Harvard	Yale Field; New Haven, CT (rivalry)	L 0–4	

== Roster ==
- Hamlin Andrus, G
- Alfred A. Biddle, C
- Henry P. Bingham, QB
- Arthur Brides, HB
- Walter L. Brown, G
- Robert Burch, E
- Carroll Cooney, T
- Allan L. Corey, QB
- Ted Coy, FB
- Fred Daly, HB
- John Field, FB
- William Goebel, G
- George Hains, FB
- Hayes, E
- Henry Hobbs, T
- Hopkins, QB
- Hyde, C
- James F. Johnson, QB
- John Kilpatrick, E
- Theodore Lilley, T
- Walter S. Logan, E
- Fred J. Murphy, HB
- Theodore C. Naedele, E
- Stephen Philbin, HB
- Richardson, G
- Warren, E
- H. M. Wheaton, QB
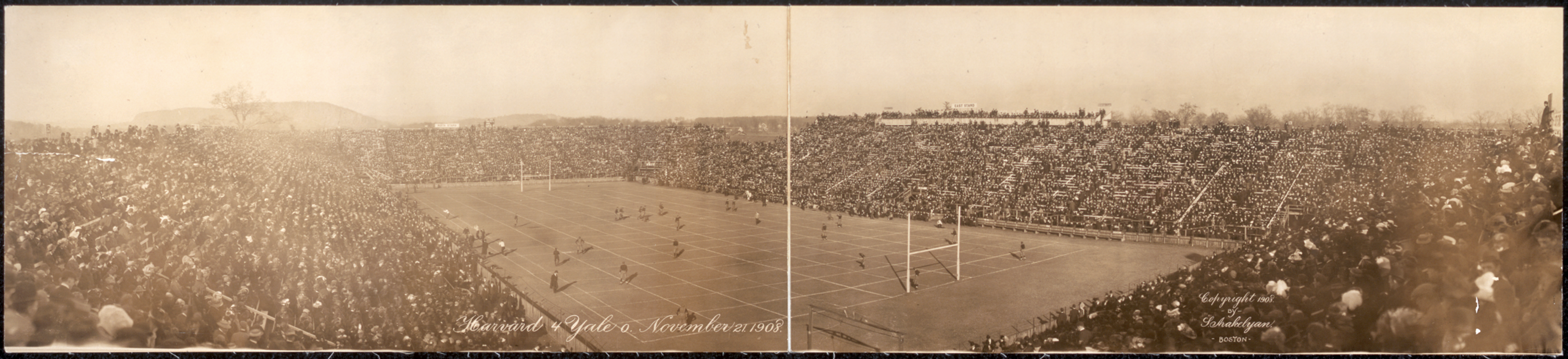
Yale was shut out by Harvard, 0-4.
