= 1908 Washington & Jefferson Red and Black football team =

American college football season

1908 Washington & Jefferson Red and Black football
- Conference: Independent
- Record: 10–2–1
- Head coach: David C. Morrow (1st season)
- Home stadium: College Park

1908 Eastern college football independents records
	Conf.			Overall
Team	W	L	T	W		L		T
Penn		–		11	–	0	–	1
Harvard		–		9	–	0	–	1
Cornell		–		7	–	1	–	1
Fordham		–		5	–	1	–	0
Yale		–		7	–	1	–	1
Dartmouth		–		6	–	1	–	1
Carlisle		–		10	–	2	–	1
Washington & Jefferson		–		10	–	2	–	1
Army		–		6	–	1	–	2
Pittsburgh		–		8	–	3	–	0
Lafayette		–		6	–	2	–	2
Princeton		–		5	–	2	–	3
Syracuse		–		6	–	3	–	1
Brown		–		5	–	3	–	1
Temple		–		3	–	2	–	1
Colgate		–		4	–	3	–	0
Lehigh		–		4	–	3	–	0
Dickinson		–		5	–	4	–	0
Amherst		–		3	–	3	–	2
Holy Cross		–		4	–	4	–	0
Penn State		–		5	–	5	–	0
Vermont		–		3	–	3	–	3
Wesleyan		–		3	–	4	–	2
Springfield Training School		–		3	–	4	–	1
NYU		–		2	–	3	–	2
Franklin & Marshall		–		4	–	6	–	1
Bucknell		–		3	–	5	–	2
Rutgers		–		3	–	5	–	1
Boston College		–		2	–	4	–	2
Carnegie Tech		–		3	–	7	–	0
Geneva		–		1	–	6	–	2
Tufts		–		1	–	6	–	1
Villanova		–		1	–	6	–	0
New Hampshire		–		1	–	7	–	0
Drexel		–		0	–	7	–	0

The 1908 Washington & Jefferson Red and Black football team represented Washington & Jefferson College as an independent during the 1908 college football season. Led by first-year head David C. Morrow, Washington & Jefferson compiled a record of 10–2–1.

== Schedule ==
Date	Time	Opponent	Site	Result	Attendance	Source
September 26		Denison	Washington, PA	W 5–0		
October 3		Western Reserve	Washington, PA	L 0–11		
October 7		Geneva	College Park; Washington, PA	W 29–0		
October 10		Westminster (PA)	Washington, PA	W 13–0		
October 17		Allegheny	Washington, PA	W 47–0		
October 24		at Yale	Yale Field; New Haven, CT	L 0–40		
October 31		at Lehigh	Lehigh Field; Bethlehem, PA	W 18–6		
November 3		West Washington All-Stars	Washington, PA	W 6–0		
November 7		Dickinson	College Park; Washington, PA	W 16–0		
November 14		at Army	The Plain; West Point, NY	T 6–6		
November 21		Waynesburg	Washington, PA	W 41–0		
November 26	3:00 p.m.	at Carnegie Tech	Tech Park; Pittsburgh, PA	W 30–0		
December 5		at Pittsburgh	Exposition Park; Pittsburgh, PA	W 14–0	6,100	
