= 1908 All-Eastern football team =

American all-star college football team

The 1908 All-Eastern football team consists of American football players chosen by various selectors as the best players at each position among the Eastern colleges and universities during the 1908 college football season.

== All-Eastern selections ==
=== Quarterbacks ===
- Ed Lange, Navy (PW-1; GS-1)
- Allie Miller, Penn (NYS-1)
- Johnny Cutler, Harvard (NYS-2)

=== Halfbacks ===
- Frederick Tibbott, Princeton (NYS-1; PW-1; GS-1)
- Bill Hollenback, Penn (NYS-1; PW-1; GS-1)
- Hamilton Corbett, Harvard (NYS-2; PW-1)
- John W. Mayhew, Brown (NYS-2)

=== Fullbacks ===
- Ted Coy, Yale (NYS-1; PW-1; GS-1)
- George Walder, Cornell (NYS-2)

=== Ends ===
- Hunter Scarlett, Penn (NYS-1; PW-1; GS-1)
- George Schildmiller, Dartmouth (NYS-1; GS-1)
- Walter Logan, Yale (NYS-2)
- Johnson, Army (NYS-2)

=== Tackles ===
- Rudy Siegling, Princeton (NYS-1; GS-1)
- Bill Horr, Syracuse (NYS-1 GS-1)
- Hamilton Fish III, Harvard (NYS-2; PW-1)
- Bernard O'Rourke, Cornell (NYS-2; PW-1)
- Percy Northcroft, Navy (PW-1)

=== Guards ===
- Hamlin Andrus, Yale (NYS-1; PW-1; GS-1)
- William Goebel, Yale (NYS-2; GS-1)
- Clark Tobin, Dartmouth (NYS-1)
- Meyer, Navy (NYS-2)

=== Centers ===
- Charles Nourse, Harvard (NYS-1; PW-1; GS-1)
- Biddle, Yale (NYS-2)

== Key ==
- NYS = New York Sun
- PW = Pop Warner, selected for Outing magazine
- GS = Gotham Scribe

== See also ==
- 1908 College Football All-America Team
