= Robert Cutler (disambiguation) =

Robert Cutler (1895–1974) was an American government official who was the first person appointed as the National Security Advisor.

Robert Cutler may also refer to:

- Robert B. Cutler (1913–2010), American rower and conspiracy theorist
- Robert Barry Cutler (1810–1882), Canadian politician who served in the Canadian House of Commons from 1872 to 1874
- Robert M. Cutler (1784–1883), Canadian merchant and political figure
- Robert S. Cutler (born 1956), American marketing executive and the founder of Creative Consumer Concepts
