= Elliott C. Cutler Jr. =

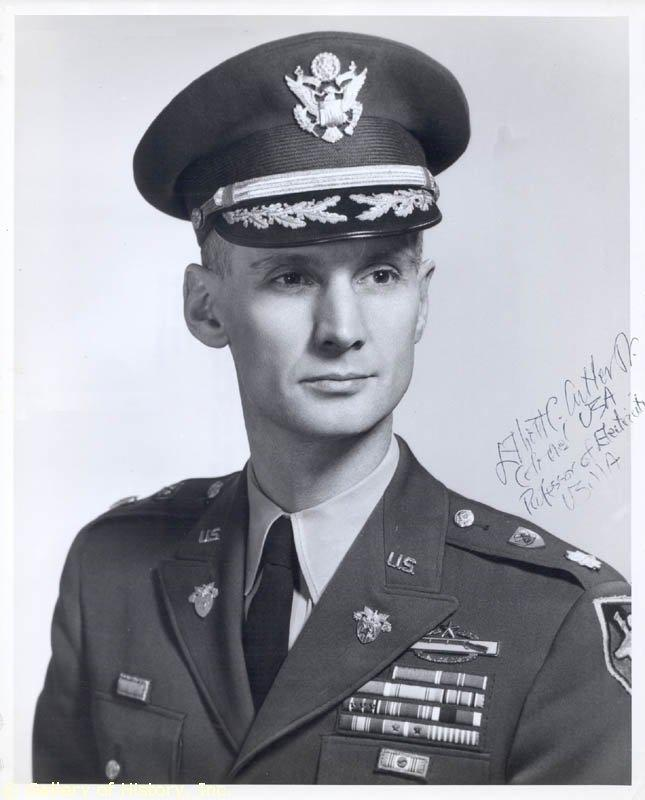
- Elliott C. Cutler Jr. shown here as lieutenant colonel
- Born: June 15, 1920; Cleveland, Ohio
- Died: November 27, 2006 (aged 86); Newburyport, Massachusetts
- Relatives: BG Elliott Cutler, father BG Robert Cutler, uncle MAJ Johnny Cutler, uncle VADM Roger W. Cutler, uncle LT Robert B. Cutler, cousin MAJ Roger W. Cutler Jr., cousin Leslie Bradley Cutler, aunt
- Military career
- Allegiance: United States
- Branch: United States Army
- Service years: 1942–1977
- Rank: Brigadier General
- Unit: Infantry Branch
- Conflicts: World War II; Korean War
- Awards: Distinguished Service Medal; Legion of Merit; Bronze Star Medal (2)

Elliot Carr Cutler Jr. (June 15, 1920 – November 27, 2006) was a brigadier general in the United States Army who served as a head of the Electrical Engineering Department at United States Military Academy from 1961 until 1977.

== Biography ==
Cutler was born on June 15, 1920, in Cleveland, Ohio, the son of doctor Elliott Cutler, who would later serve as brigadier general in the Army Medical Corps during World War II. Cutler Jr. attended the United States Military Academy at West Point, New York and graduated from that institution in 1942.

Subsequently, he was commissioned a second lieutenant in the 76th Infantry Division and participated in the combats of European Theatre. For his service during the war, Cutler received a Bronze Star Medal, Purple Heart for wound and Combat Infantryman Badge.

After the war, 76th Infantry Division was disbanded at the end of the August 1945 and Cutler was transferred to the 19th Infantry Regiment of the 24th Infantry Division. He served with the regiment during Occupation of Japan as a company commander until 1950.

When the Korean War broke out, Cutler was deployed with the 24th Infantry Division during this conflict. For his participation in this war, Cutler was awarded with Legion of Merit, Oak Leaf Cluster to his Bronze Star Medal and star to his Combat Infantryman Badge.

After the war, Cutler earned his PhD in electrical engineering at Georgia Tech and subsequently served as a professor at the United States Military Academy at West Point, New York, where he taught electrical engineering. In 1961, Cutler was appointed a head of the Electrical Engineering Department. In this capacity, Cutler championed the use of computers in the academy's curriculum, resulting in the establishment of the Academic Computer Committee, which would bring the school into the technological age.

Cutler served in this capacity until 1977, when he retired from the army. At the retirement ceremony, he was awarded with Army Distinguished Service Medal for his military achievement and promoted to the rank of brigadier general.

Cutler died at the age of 86 at Country Center for Health & Rehabilitation in Newburyport, Massachusetts. He was married to Genevieve Cutler (néé Spalding), with whom he had son Elliott C. Cutler, III and daughter Genevieve Cutler.

== Decorations ==
Here is Cutler's ribbon bar:

Combat Infantryman Badge with one star
1st Row	Army Distinguished Service Medal	Legion of Merit	Bronze Star with Oak Leaf Cluster	Purple Heart
2nd Row	American Defense Service Medal	American Campaign Medal	European-African-Middle Eastern Campaign Medal	World War II Victory Medal
3rd Row	Army of Occupation Medal	National Defense Service Medal with Oak Leaf Cluster	Korean Service Medal with two service stars	United Nations Korea Medal
