= General Cutler =

General Cutler may refer to:

- Elliott C. Cutler Jr. (1920–2006), U.S. Army brigadier general
- Elliott Cutler (1888–1947), U.S. Army brigadier general
- Lysander Cutler (1807–1866), Union Army brigadier general and brevet major general
