= Robert Cutler =

American government official (1895–1974)

1st and 3rd United States National Security Advisor
- In office January 6, 1957 – June 24, 1958
- President: Dwight Eisenhower
- Preceded by: William Harding Jackson (acting)
- Succeeded by: Gordon Gray
- In office January 20, 1953 – April 2, 1955
- President: Dwight Eisenhower
- Preceded by: James Lay (Executive Secretary of the National Security Council)
- Succeeded by: Dillon Anderson

Corporation Counsel of Boston
- In office October 25, 1940 – July 28, 1942
- Preceded by: Henry Parkman Jr.
- Succeeded by: Robert H. Hopkins

Personal details
- Born: June 12, 1895 Brookline, Massachusetts, U.S.
- Died: May 8, 1974 (aged 78) Concord, Massachusetts, U.S.
- Party: Republican
- Education: Harvard University (BA, LLB)

Robert Cutler (June 12, 1895 – May 8, 1974) was an American government official who was the first person appointed as the president's National Security Advisor. He served US President Dwight Eisenhower in that role from 1953 to 1955 and from 1957 to 1958.

== Early life ==
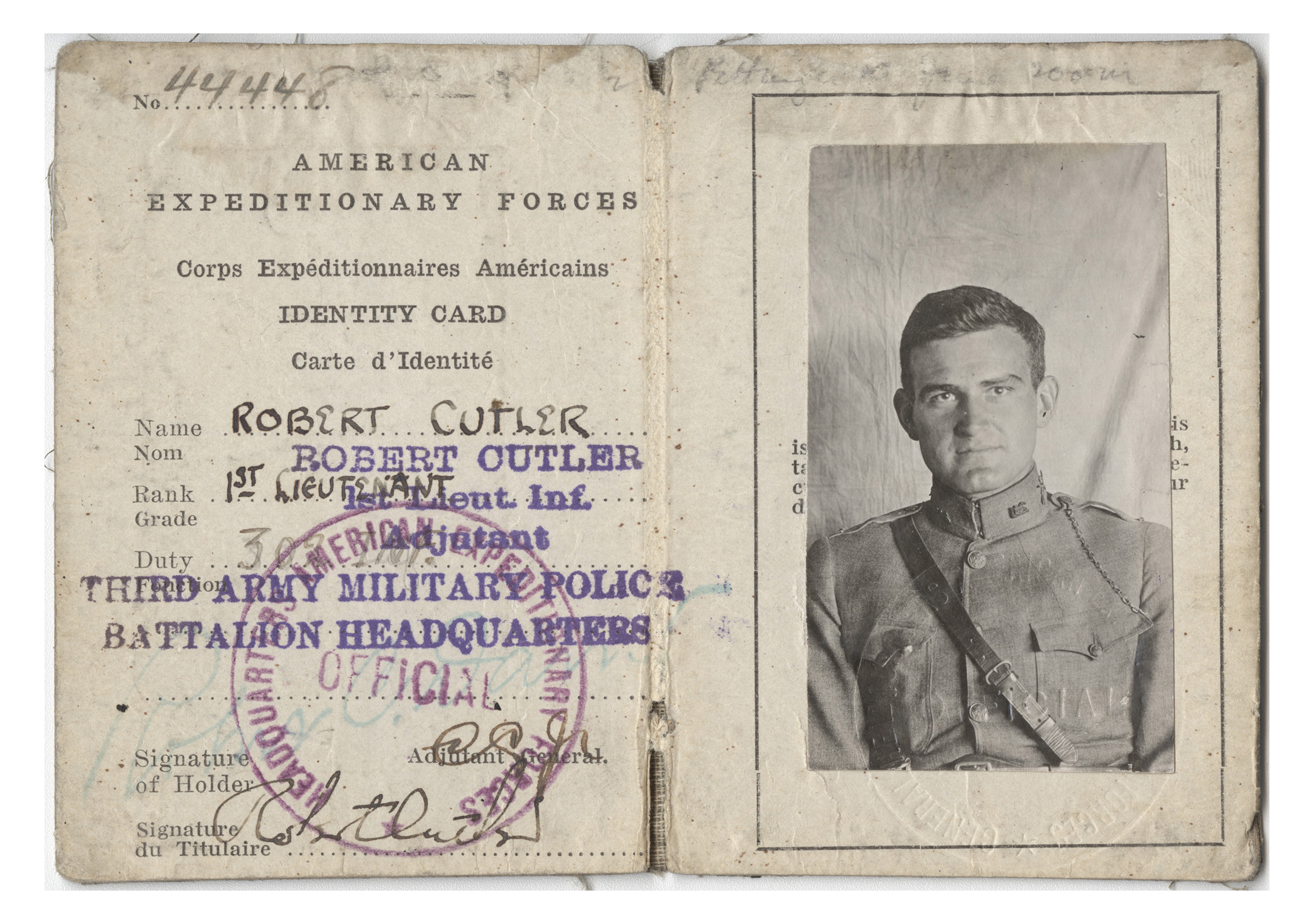
Cutler's identification card during World War I

He was born on June 12, 1895, in Brookline, Massachusetts. He was the youngest of five sons born to George C. and Mary F. Wilson Cutler. His brothers were Elliott Carr Cutler, a professor at the Harvard Medical School and a surgeon, Harvard quarterback Johnny Cutler, Roger W. Cutler, a US Navy officer and the husband of Leslie Bradley Cutler, and George C. Cutler Jr.

Cutler attended Harvard College and planned on becoming an English teacher and writer. He was class poet, wrote the baccalaureate hymn, and graduated second in his class in 1916. After graduating, he taught at Harvard and Radcliffe College and authored two novels: Louisburg Square (1917) and The Speckled Bird (1923).

During World War I, he volunteered with the American Expeditionary Forces. He served in France as a first lieutenant with the 76th Division. After the war, he spent eight, months as an adjutant of the 3rd Army Military Police with the Army of Occupation. In 1922, he graduated from Harvard Law School.

== Early career ==
After graduating from Harvard Law School, Cutler went to work for the firm of Herrick, Smith, Donald & Farley. He also served as treasurer of Peter Bent Brigham Hospital and as president of Community Chests and Councils, Inc., chairman of the 1937 Greater Boston Community Fund Drive and was a director of the Saco-Lowell Shops and the Old Colony Trust Company.

On October 25, 1940, Cutler was appointed corporation counsel for the city of Boston by Mayor Maurice J. Tobin.

== World War II ==
On July 28, 1942, Cutler resigned as corporation counsel to join the US Army. US President Franklin Roosevelt nominated Cutler for the position of head occupational analyst of the Army Specialist Corps (ASC) with the rank of colonel. After the ASC had been disbanded, Cutler served as chief of the Procurement Division. During the 1944 presidential election, he served as executive officer of the War Ballot Commission. He was awarded the Distinguished Service Medal in December 1944.

In 1945, he worked on special assignments for US Secretary of War Henry L. Stimson and the US Army Chief of Staff George Marshall. In October, he was promoted to brigadier general and was awarded the Legion of Merit for "his foresight and careful planning, consummate tact, unusual ability and vigor" during his service with the Legislative and Liaison Division of the War Department Special Staff. He received his discharge on December 9, 1945.

== Postwar career ==
On January 9, 1946, Cutler succeeded Channing H. Cox as president of the Old Colony Trust Company. He was later elected president of Peter Bent Brigham Hospital. From 1947 to 1949, he headed the largest survey of hospital, health, and welfare facilities in New England.

== 1952 presidential campaign ==
In 1952, Cutler served as Eisenhower's personal secretary on the campaign train, a position that had him perform a number of tasks, including speechwriting and advising. U.S. News & World Report described Cutler as "emerging as the right-hand man of the General" and "probably closer to the candidate in a personal sense than Gov. Sherman Adams, who is generally regard as top man."

== National Security Advisor ==
On December 29, 1952, President-elect Eisenhower appointed Cutler as assistant to the president for national security affairs. In that position, Cutler played a major role in turning the National Security Council into a top policy making body. He tendered his resignation on March 8, 1955, and was succeeded by Dillon Anderson on April 1. On March 31, 1955, he received the Medal of Freedom for his "outstanding contribution to the security and defense of our nation.

Cutler oversaw the drafting of Eisenhower's Executive Order 10450, signed on April 27, 1953, contributing language that identified "sexual perversion" as grounds for exclusion from employment by the federal government. It represented an attempt to fulfill Eisenhower's campaign promise, made in response to charges made by Senator Joseph McCarthy, to remove "subversives" from the federal government. The order initiated the years-long purge of gays and lesbians from employment by the federal government, the Lavender Scare component of the Red Scare witch hunts of the 1950s.

Cutler resigned his post in 1955 apparently for fear that the disclosure of his secret homosexuality might harm the Eisenhower administration. His homosexuality was known to some Washington insiders, including the prominent columnist Joseph Alsop, a closet gay himself, and Charles Bohlen, whose nomination as ambassador to Moscow had been threatened by McCarthy's innuendo about his sexuality.

In May 1955, Cutler returned to the National Security Council as a part-time consultant and took its leadership position, then called the Special Assistant for National Security Affairs, on January 6, 1957. He was succeeded by Gordon Gray on June 24, 1958.

== Later life ==
In 1958, Cutler was nominated for a seat on the Massachusetts Board of Regional Community Colleges by Governor Foster Furcolo. His nomination was rejected by the Massachusetts Governor's Council by a 4–3 vote on the grounds that the position should go to a Democrat. Furcolo submitted Cutler's nomination again, and on December 30, the Council approved his appointment by a 6–2 vote.

On October 14, 1959, Eisenhower announced that he would nominate Cutler to serve a three-year term as an executive director of the new Inter-American Development Bank. He was sworn in by Eisenhower on February 2, 1960. He resigned effective July 15, 1962.

He published his memoirs, No Time for Rest, in 1966.

He died on May 8, 1974, in Concord, Massachusetts. Never married and predeceased by all of his brothers, Cutler left no immediate survivors but was survived by several nieces and nephews, including Elliott C. Cutler Jr., Robert B. Cutler and Roger W. Cutler Jr.

Political offices
| Preceded by James Lay as Executive Secretary of the National Security Council | National Security Advisor; 1953–1955 | Succeeded by Dillon Anderson |
| Preceded by William Jackson | National Security Advisor; 1957–1958 | Succeeded by Gordon Gray |
