= Robert Hopkins =

Robert Hopkins may refer to:

- Bob Hopkins (1934–2015), professional basketball player and coach
- Bobb Hopkins, actor/director and founder of the National Hobo Association
- Bobby Hopkins (1957–2019), American football player and world champion arm-wrestler
- Robert Hopkins (footballer) (1961–2026), English professional football player
- Robert Hopkins (screenwriter) (1886–1966), Academy Award nominated screenwriter
- Robert E. Hopkins (1915–2009), president of the Optical Society of America
- Rob Hopkins (born 1968), originator of the Transition Towns movement
- Robert H. Hopkins (1902–1968), American attorney
- Robert Thurston Hopkins (1884–1958), British writer and ghost hunter
- Robert Hopkins (philosopher) (born 1964), British philosopher
