= 1908 college football rankings =

- Season: 1908
- Bowl season: 1908–09 bowl games
- End of season champions: Harvard

The 1908 college football season rankings included a ranking by New York City newspaper The Sun.

== The Sun ==
In November 1908, New York City newspaper The Sun published their top-twelve ranking.

Rank	Team	Record
1	Harvard	9–0–1
2	Penn	11–0–1
3	Yale	7–1–1
4	Dartmouth	6–1–1
5	Cornell	7–1–1
6	Army	6–1–2
7	Navy	9–2–1
8	Princeton	5–2–3
9	Brown	5–3–1
10	Syracuse	6–3–1
11	Carlisle	10–2–1
12	Colgate	4–3

== See also ==
- 1908 College Football All-America Team
