= Dartmouth–Harvard football rivalry =

American college football rivalry

- Dartmouth Big Green Harvard Crimson
- First meeting: November 9, 1882; Harvard, 53–0
- Latest meeting: October 30, 2026; Dartmouth, 24–14
- Next meeting: October 30, 2027

Statistics
- Total meetings: 129
- All-time series: Harvard leads, 75–49–5
- Longest win streak: Harvard, 18 (1882–1902)
- Current win streak: Dartmouth, 1 (2026–present)

Locations of Dartmouth and Harvard

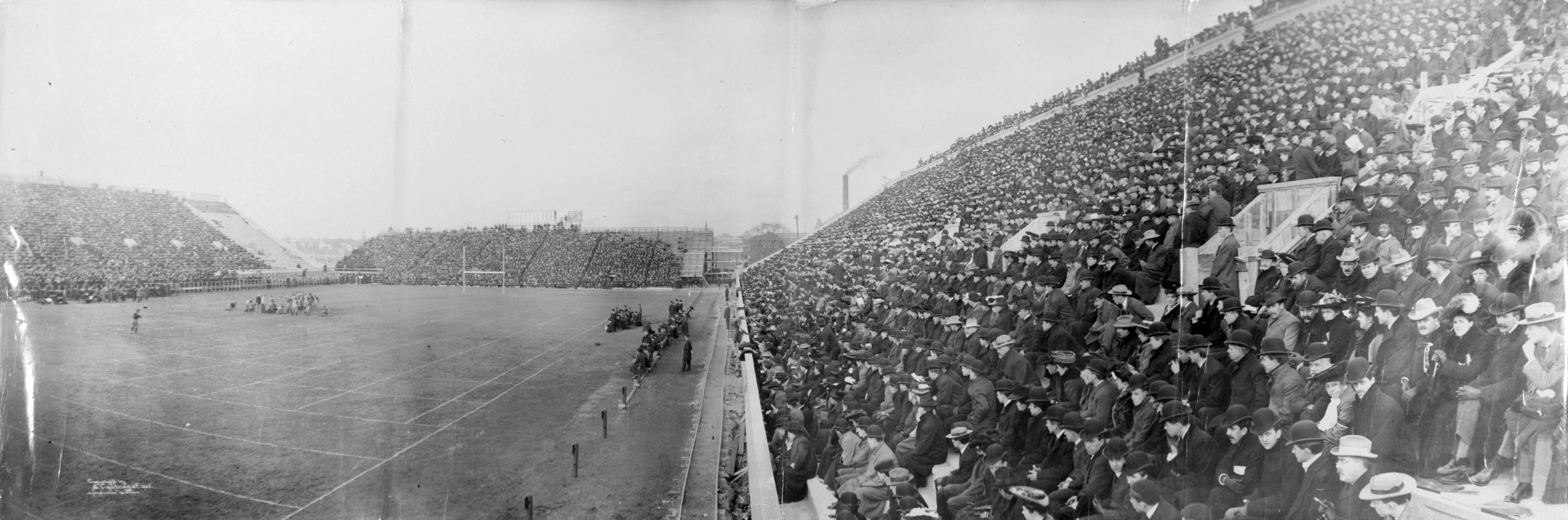
The 1903 contest.

The Dartmouth–Harvard football rivalry is an American college football rivalry between the Dartmouth Big Green and Harvard Crimson. The series began in 1882 and is considered one of the fifteen oldest rivalries in College football. Since the formation of the Ivy League in 1954, the annual game has been a key decider in the crowning of the league's champion. Dartmouth has captured a league-record 19 Ivy League championships, while the Crimson have obtained 17 titles, tied for third-most. Furthermore, since the start of round-robin play, Harvard and Dartmouth have posted the first- and second-best league winning percentages at 0.628 and 0.606 respectively.

The rivalry was initially dominated by Harvard, with the Crimson owning a spot among the predominant collegiate programs of the era, capturing 12 national championships (7 claimed) recognized by NCAA-designated major selectors, all won prior to 1920. As a result, the upstart Big Green were unable to score until 1900, or to win until 1903, which came at the dedication of Harvard Stadium. In 1908, Harvard's Johnny Cutler won the game in the last few minutes. Dartmouth entered its own dominant period beginning in 1934, winning 15 of 19 contests, including their first victory at home in Hanover in 1955. The two teams entered a hotly-contested few decades of games, before Harvard seized the advantage in the late 1990s, winning an unprecedented 20 of 21 games. However, Dartmouth's recent resurgence in 2010s have led to several league championships and victories over Harvard, including a dramatic finish in the 2019 contest. Trailing 6 to 3 and needing a victory to keep their championship hopes alive, the Big Green's Derek Kyler connected with Masaki Aerts on a game-concluding Hail Mary pass, sealing a 9–6 victory.

== Game results ==
Dartmouth victories	Harvard victories	Tie games

No.	Date	Location	Winner	Score
1	November 9, 1882	Cambridge, Massachusetts	Harvard	8–0
2	November 10, 1884	Cambridge, Massachusetts	Harvard	29–0
3	October 30, 1886	Cambridge, Massachusetts	Harvard	70–0
4	October 30, 1888	Cambridge, Massachusetts	Harvard	74–0
5	October 12, 1889	Cambridge, Massachusetts	Harvard	38–0
6	October 4, 1890	Cambridge, Massachusetts	Harvard	43–0
7	October 22, 1890	Cambridge, Massachusetts	Harvard	64–0
8	October 3, 1891	Cambridge, Massachusetts	Harvard	16–0
9	October 1, 1892	Cambridge, Massachusetts	Harvard	48–0
10	September 30, 1893	Cambridge, Massachusetts	Harvard	16–0
11	October 21, 1893	Cambridge, Massachusetts	Harvard	36–0
12	September 29, 1894	Boston, Massachusetts	Harvard	22–0
13	October 2, 1895	Boston, Massachusetts	Harvard	4–0
14	October 9, 1897	Boston, Massachusetts	Harvard	13–0
15	October 1, 1898	Boston, Massachusetts	Harvard	21–0
16	November 11, 1899	Boston, Massachusetts	Harvard	11–0
17	November 16, 1901	Boston, Massachusetts	Harvard	27–12
18	November 22, 1902	Boston, Massachusetts	Harvard	16–6
19	November 14, 1903	Boston, Massachusetts	Dartmouth	11–0
20	November 5, 1904	Boston, Massachusetts	Tie	0–0
21	November 18, 1905	Boston, Massachusetts	Tie	6–6
22	November 17, 1906	Boston, Massachusetts	Harvard	22–9
23	November 16, 1907	Boston, Massachusetts	Dartmouth	22–0
24	November 14, 1908	Boston, Massachusetts	Harvard	6–0
25	November 13, 1909	Boston, Massachusetts	Harvard	12–3
26	November 12, 1910	Boston, Massachusetts	Harvard	18–0
27	November 18, 1911	Boston, Massachusetts	Harvard	5–3
28	November 16, 1912	Boston, Massachusetts	Harvard	3–0
29	October 28, 1922	Boston, Massachusetts	Harvard	12–3
30	October 27, 1923	Boston, Massachusetts	Dartmouth	16–0
31	October 25, 1924	Boston, Massachusetts	Dartmouth	6–0
32	October 24, 1925	Boston, Massachusetts	Dartmouth	32–9
33	October 23, 1926	Boston, Massachusetts	Harvard	16–12
34	October 22, 1927	Boston, Massachusetts	Dartmouth	30–6
35	October 27, 1928	Boston, Massachusetts	Harvard	19–7
36	October 26, 1929	Boston, Massachusetts	Dartmouth	34–7
37	October 25, 1930	Boston, Massachusetts	Dartmouth	7–2
38	November 7, 1931	Boston, Massachusetts	Harvard	7–6
39	October 22, 1932	Boston, Massachusetts	Harvard	10–7
40	October 28, 1933	Boston, Massachusetts	Tie	7–7
41	October 27, 1934	Boston, Massachusetts	Dartmouth	10–0
42	October 26, 1935	Boston, Massachusetts	Dartmouth	14–6
43	October 24, 1936	Boston, Massachusetts	Dartmouth	26–7
44	October 23, 1937	Boston, Massachusetts	Dartmouth	20–2
45	October 22, 1938	Boston, Massachusetts	Dartmouth	13–7
46	October 28, 1939	Boston, Massachusetts	Dartmouth	16–0
47	October 26, 1940	Boston, Massachusetts	Dartmouth	7–6
48	October 18, 1941	Boston, Massachusetts	Harvard	7–0
49	October 17, 1942	Boston, Massachusetts	Dartmouth	14–2
50	November 9, 1946	Hanover, New Hampshire	Harvard	21–7
51	October 25, 1947	Boston, Massachusetts	Dartmouth	14–13
52	October 23, 1948	Boston, Massachusetts	Dartmouth	14–7
53	October 22, 1949	Boston, Massachusetts	Dartmouth	27–13
54	October 28, 1950	Boston, Massachusetts	Dartmouth	27–7
55	October 27, 1951	Boston, Massachusetts	Dartmouth	26–20
56	October 25, 1952	Boston, Massachusetts	Harvard	26–19
57	October 24, 1953	Boston, Massachusetts	Harvard	20–14
58	October 23, 1954	Boston, Massachusetts	Dartmouth	13–7
59	October 22, 1955	Hanover, New Hampshire	Dartmouth	14–9
60	October 27, 1956	Boston, Massachusetts	Harvard	28–21
61	October 26, 1957	Boston, Massachusetts	Dartmouth	26–0
62	October 25, 1958	Boston, Massachusetts	Harvard	16–8
63	October 24, 1959	Boston, Massachusetts	Dartmouth	9–0
64	October 22, 1960	Boston, Massachusetts	Harvard	9–6
65	October 28, 1961	Boston, Massachusetts	Harvard	21–15

No.	Date	Location	Winner	Score
66	October 27, 1962	Boston, Massachusetts	Dartmouth	24–6
67	October 26, 1963	Boston, Massachusetts	Harvard	17–13
68	October 24, 1964	Boston, Massachusetts	Dartmouth	48–0
69	October 23, 1965	Boston, Massachusetts	Dartmouth	14–0
70	October 22, 1966	Boston, Massachusetts	Harvard	19–14
71	October 28, 1967	Boston, Massachusetts	Dartmouth	23–21
72	October 26, 1968	Boston, Massachusetts	Harvard	22–7
73	October 25, 1969	Boston, Massachusetts	Dartmouth	24–10
74	October 24, 1970	Boston, Massachusetts	Dartmouth	37–14
75	October 23, 1971	Boston, Massachusetts	Dartmouth	16–13
76	October 28, 1972	Boston, Massachusetts	Tie	21–21
77	October 27, 1973	Boston, Massachusetts	Dartmouth	24–18
78	October 26, 1974	Hanover, New Hampshire	Harvard	17–15
79	October 25, 1975	Boston, Massachusetts	Harvard	24–10
80	October 16, 1976	Hanover, New Hampshire	Harvard	17–10
81	October 23, 1977	Boston, Massachusetts	Harvard	31–25
82	October 21, 1978	Boston, Massachusetts	Harvard	24–19
83	October 20, 1979	Boston, Massachusetts	Dartmouth	10–7
84	October 18, 1980	Hanover, New Hampshire	Dartmouth	30–12
85	October 17, 1981	Boston, Massachusetts	Dartmouth	24–10
86	October 16, 1982	Hanover, New Hampshire	Dartmouth	14–12
87	October 15, 1983	Boston, Massachusetts	Dartmouth	28–12
88	October 20, 1984	Hanover, New Hampshire	Harvard	21–7
89	October 19, 1985	Boston, Massachusetts	Harvard	17–7
90	October 18, 1986	Hanover, New Hampshire	Harvard	42–26
91	October 17, 1987	Boston, Massachusetts	Harvard	42–3
92	October 15, 1988	Hanover, New Hampshire	Dartmouth	38–7
93	October 21, 1989	Boston, Massachusetts	Harvard	6–5
94	October 27, 1990	Hanover, New Hampshire	Dartmouth	17–0
95	November 2, 1991	Boston, Massachusetts	Tie	31–31
96	October 31, 1992	Boston, Massachusetts	Dartmouth	31–7
97	October 30, 1993	Hanover, New Hampshire	Dartmouth	39–34
98	October 29, 1994	Hanover, New Hampshire	Harvard	35–12
99	October 28, 1995	Boston, Massachusetts	Dartmouth	23–7
100	November 2, 1996	Boston, Massachusetts	Dartmouth	6–3
101	November 1, 1997	Hanover, New Hampshire	Harvard	24–0
102	October 31, 1998	Hanover, New Hampshire	Harvard	20–7
103	October 30, 1999	Boston, Massachusetts	Harvard	63–21
104	October 28, 2000	Hanover, New Hampshire	Harvard	49–7
105	October 27, 2001	Boston, Massachusetts	Harvard	31–21
106	November 2, 2002	Hanover, New Hampshire	Harvard	31–26
107	November 1, 2003	Boston, Massachusetts	Dartmouth	30–16
108	October 30, 2004	Hanover, New Hampshire	Harvard	13–12
109	October 30, 2005	Boston, Massachusetts	Harvard	42–14
110	October 28, 2006	Hanover, New Hampshire	Harvard	28–0
111	October 27, 2007	Boston, Massachusetts	Harvard	28–21
112	November 1, 2008	Hanover, New Hampshire	Harvard	35–7
113	October 31, 2009	Boston, Massachusetts	Harvard	42–21
114	October 30, 2010	Hanover, New Hampshire	Harvard	30–14
115	October 29, 2011	Boston, Massachusetts	Harvard	41–10
116	October 27, 2012	Hanover, New Hampshire	Harvard	31–14
117	November 2, 2013	Boston, Massachusetts	Harvard	24–21
118	November 1, 2014	Hanover, New Hampshire	Harvard	23–12
119	October 30, 2015	Boston, Massachusetts	Harvard	14–13
120	October 29, 2016	Hanover, New Hampshire	Harvard	23–21
121	October 28, 2017	Boston, Massachusetts	Harvard	25–22
122	October 27, 2018	Hanover, New Hampshire	Dartmouth	24–17
123	November 2, 2019	Boston, Massachusetts	Dartmouth	9–6
124	October 30, 2021	Boston, Massachusetts	Dartmouth	20–17
125	October 28, 2022	Hanover, New Hampshire	Harvard	28–13
126	October 28, 2023	Boston, Massachusetts	Harvard	17–9
127	November 2, 2024	Hanover, New Hampshire	Harvard	31–27
128	November 1, 2025	Boston, Massachusetts	Harvard	31–10
129	October 30, 2026	Hanover, New Hampshire	Dartmouth	24–14
Series: Harvard leads 75–49–5

== See also ==
- List of NCAA college football rivalry games
- List of most-played college football series in NCAA Division I
