= Draper Committee =

The Presidents Committee to Study the United States Military Assistance Program ("Draper Committee.") was a bipartisan committee, created in November 1958 by U.S. President Dwight D. Eisenhower to undertake a completely independent, objective, and non-partisan analysis of the military assistance aspects of the 1949 Mutual Defense Assistance Act.

In 1965, William Henry Draper Jr. and others founded the Population Crisis Committee, which later changed its name to Population Action International. This organization is not the same as the Draper Committee.

== Members ==
The committee was composed of:

- William Henry Draper Jr. (chairman), board chairman of the Mexican Light & Power Co. and retired World War II major general
- Dillon Anderson, Houston lawyer, onetime presidential National Security Advisor
- Joseph M. Dodge, Detroit banker, onetime Budget Director
- Alfred Maximilian Gruenther, American Red Cross president, onetime Supreme Allied Commander in Europe
- Marx Leva, Washington lawyer, onetime Assistant Secretary of Defense
- John J. McCloy, New York banker, onetime High Commissioner in Germany
- George C. McGhee, Dallas businessman, onetime Assistant Secretary of State
- General Joseph T. McNarney (ret.), onetime commander of U.S. forces in Europe
- Admiral Arthur W. Radford (ret.), onetime Joint Chiefs of Staff chairman
- James E. Webb, Oklahoma oilman, onetime Under Secretary of State, onetime Budget Director
