= Dillon Anderson =

American lawyer and government official (1906-1974)

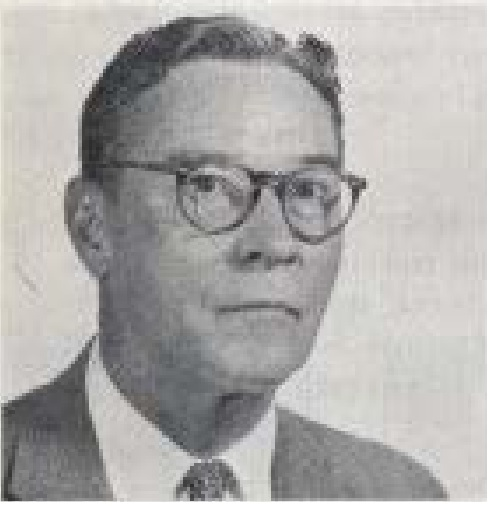

2nd United States National Security Advisor
- In office April 2, 1955 – September 1, 1956
- President: Dwight Eisenhower
- Preceded by: Robert Cutler
- Succeeded by: William Harding Jackson (acting)

Personal details
- Born: July 14, 1906 McKinney, Texas, U.S.
- Died: January 28, 1974 (aged 67) Houston, Texas, U.S.
- Party: Democratic
- Spouse: Lena Carter Carroll (m. 1931)
- Children: 3
- Education: Texas Christian University (attended); University of Oklahoma (BS); Yale University (LLB)

Dillon Anderson (July 14, 1906 – January 28, 1974) was an official in the federal government of the United States during the Eisenhower administration (1953–61). He served as the 2nd National Security Advisor from April 2, 1955, to September 1, 1956. He also was a member of the Draper Committee.

== Biography ==
Anderson was born on July 14, 1906, in McKinney, Texas, the son of Joseph A. and Bessie Dillon. After attending Texas Christian University, Anderson received his B.S. from the University of Oklahoma (1927) and his LL.B. from Yale Law School (1929). He served in the United States Army during World War II (1942–1945), and earned the Army Commendation Ribbon and Legion of Merit. He worked on lend-lease material and military government planning, attaining the rank of colonel.

Anderson in 1940 was made partner in Houston, Texas, law firm of Baker Botts, before becoming National Security Advisor, Anderson was an official at the National Security Council from 1953 to 1955. He was elected a Fellow of the American Academy of Arts and Sciences in 1959.

Mr. Anderson resigned his post as special assistant in August 1956, to return to his law practice. In 1958, he was elected chairman of the Texas National Bank. He was a director of Westinghouse Electric Corporation and of the Monsanto Chemical Corporation, and a trustee of the Carnegie Endowment for International Peace, of the Brookings Institution and of the Schlumberger Foundation.

He died on January 28, 1974, in Houston, Texas.

Political offices
Preceded by Robert Cutler	National Security Advisor; 1955–1956	Succeeded by William Jackson; Acting
