= Conspiracy Museum =

Museum in Dallas, Texas

Coordinates: 32.7785°N 96.8056°W

The Conspiracy Museum was a private exhibition of conspiracy theories in the West End Historic District of downtown Dallas, Texas (USA). R. B. Cutler, self-described as an "assassinologist", opened the museum in 1995.

The Conspiracy Museum was located across the street from the Kennedy Memorial in Dallas, Texas in the Katy Building. The museum was not limited in scope to the conspiracy theories surrounding the assassination of John F. Kennedy, but it also covered Robert F. Kennedy, Martin Luther King Jr., Abraham Lincoln, and Ted Kennedy's Chappaquiddick incident. Cutler's argument was that all these conspiracies can be tied together. The museum was often overlooked by visitors heading to the more well-known Sixth Floor Museum.

The museum closed on December 30, 2006, having lost its lease. The building's owners announced that a Quiznos sandwich shop would take its place. Tom Bowden, the museum's president, said that the museum would re-locate to another part of the Katy Building or another location entirely and that detailed plans would be released.

== See also ==
- John F. Kennedy assassination conspiracy theories
- Robert F. Kennedy assassination conspiracy theories
