= Elliott Cutler =

American surgeon, military physician and medical educator

Elliott Cutler, F.A.C.S.
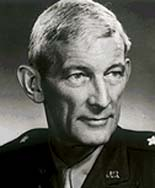
- Brig. Gen. Elliott Cutler in 1945 (U.S. Army photograph)
- Born: Elliott Carr Cutler; July 30, 1888; Bangor, Maine, US
- Died: August 16, 1947 (aged 59); Brookline, Massachusetts, US
- Relatives: BG Elliott C. Cutler Jr., son BG Robert Cutler, brother VADM Roger W. Cutler, brother MAJ Johnny Cutler, brother LT Robert B. Cutler, nephew MAJ Roger W. Cutler Jr., nephew
- Military career
- Allegiance: United States
- Branch: United States Army
- Service years: 1917–1919, 1942–1946
- Rank: Brigadier general
- Conflicts: World War I World War II
- Awards: Distinguished Service Medal (2); Legion of Merit; Order of the Bath

Elliot Carr Cutler CB OBE (July 30, 1888 – August 16, 1947) was an American surgeon, military physician, and medical educator. He was Moseley Professor of Surgery at Harvard Medical School, surgeon-in-chief at Peter Bent Brigham Hospital from 1932 to 1947, and a brigadier general in the U.S. Army Medical Corps.

== Early life ==
Cutler was born on July 30, 1888, in Bangor, Maine. He was the son of George Chalmers Cutler and Mary Franklin Wilson. His father was a lumber merchant. He was named for his maternal grandmother, Mary Elliot Carr (d. 1869), who belonged to a prominent political and mercantile family in Bangor (see Francis Carr). The Carr-Wing House remains a local landmark.

Cutler studied at Harvard College and graduated from that institution in 1909. After completing his A.B., he studied at Harvard Medical School (HMS) and received his M.D. summa cum laude in 1913, ranking first in his class. He studied pathology with Frank Burr Mallory at the Boston City Hospital (now Boston Medical Center) during his fourth year at HMS. He was subsequently awarded the John Harvard Fellowship. He was also elected permanent class president.

After completing his graduation, he spent five months in Europe, mostly in London and at the University of Heidelberg in Germany, where he studied pathology with Ludolf von Krehl.

== Career ==
After returning from Germany, he served as surgical intern at the Peter Bent Brigham Hospital (now Brigham and Women's Hospital) in Boston, Massachusetts. He joined the Harvard Unit of the American Ambulance Hospital in Paris, France, in 1915. He declined the invitation by William S. Halsted to run the Hunterian Laboratory at Johns Hopkins University in 1916. He studied immunity at the Rockefeller Institute for Medical Research.

The United States entered World War I in 1917. This prompted Cutler to return to France as a captain in the Army Medical Corps assigned to the Harvard Unit, Base Hospital Number 5. He returned to Boston after the end of the war. He joined the Brigham Hospital as resident surgeon. He married Caroline Pollard Parker in the spring of 1919. They had five children.

Cutler was an associate in the department of surgery at Harvard Medical School and also directed Harvard surgical research laboratory from 1921 to 1923. In 1923 he performed the world's first successful heart valve surgery. The patient was a 12-year-old girl with rheumatic mitral stenosis who underwent mitral valve repair. This surgery was hailed as a milestone by the British Medical Journal. It proved to have a mortality rate of 90 percent and it was abandoned by Cutler in 1928. Surgical repair for mitral valve stenosis was not reattempted until 1945.

Cutler left Harvard Medical School in 1924 to become professor of surgery at Case Western Reserve University School of Medicine and director of surgery at the Lakeside Hospital in Cleveland, Ohio, where he continued his laboratory work. In 1932 he succeeded Harvey Cushing as Moseley Professor of Surgery at Harvard Medical School and surgeon-in-chief at Peter Bent Brigham Hospital. He held those two positions until his death in 1947.

At the outbreak of World War II, the governor of Massachusetts appointed Cutler as medical director of the state committee on public safety. He was again called into active service in the Army Medical Corps in 1942, and was named chief consultant in surgery in the European Theater of Operations (ETO). Together with William Shainline Middleton, who was the chief consultant in medicine, Cutler structured the system of care for injured and sick U.S. soldiers in the ETO. Later, he served as chief of the professional services division in the office of the surgeon general in Europe. As chief surgical consultant, he played an important role in obtaining blood from the U.S. for use in treating the wounded. He was promoted to the rank of brigadier beneral (O-7) in 1945.

Cutler published papers extensively throughout his career about thyroidectomy, thoracotomy, cardiotomy, and mitral valvulotomy. He was also the co-author of the 1939 book The Atlas of Surgery with Robert M. Zollinger. The book remained a standard surgery textbook throughout the 20th century.

Cutler was a member of the Harvard University board of overseers from 1927 to 1932. He was president of the Associated Harvard Clubs from 1936 to 1937 and president of the Harvard Alumni Association from 1939 to 1940. Outside of Harvard, Cutler was a member or officer of several medical and scientific organizations, including the American Surgical Association (president, 1947), the American College of Surgeons (fellow), the American Association for Thoracic Surgery, the American Society for Clinical Investigation, and the Society for Clinical Surgery (president, 1941–46).

Cutler also served on the editorial boards of several professional publications, including the American Heart Journal, the Journal of Clinical Investigation, Surgery, the American Journal of Surgery, and the British Journal of Surgery. He was a founder of the American Board of Surgery and the Society for Consultants to the Surgeons General of the Armed Forces of the United States. He was also elected a member of the Royal Academy of Medicine in Rome, Italy, and an honorary fellow of the Royal College of Surgeons in Britain.

== Later years and death ==
The later years of Cutler's life were primarily devoted to surgical practice, teaching, and research at Harvard Medical School. On August 16, 1947, he died from metastatic adenocarcinoma of the prostate at age 59 in Brookline, Massachusetts. His son, Elliott C. Cutler Jr., was a United States Military Academy graduate in the class of 1942. He also attained the rank of brigadier general.

== Awards and decorations ==
In April 1922, Cutler received the Distinguished Service Medal for his military service in the First World War. For his contributions to military medicine in the Second World War, he received a second Distinguished Service Medal with Oak Leaf Cluster, the Legion of Merit from the United States War Department, the Order of the British Empire by King George VI of Britain, the Croix de Guerre by the French government, the Companion of the Order of the Bath, and Chevalier of the Légion d'honneur. In June 1947, he received the prestigious Henry Jacob Bigelow Medal of the Boston Surgical Society for his accomplishments in surgery. The Harvard Medical School established a professorship of surgery in Cutler's name in 1965. In 1969, the United States Army announced that the new base hospital at the former Fort Devens, Massachusetts would be named in his honor.

Here is his ribbon bar:

1st Row	Army Distinguished Service Medal with Oak Leaf Cluster	Legion of Merit	World War I Victory Medal with four battle clasps	Army of Occupation of Germany Medal
2nd Row	American Campaign Medal	European-African-Middle Eastern Campaign Medal with four service stars	World War II Victory Medal	Army of Occupation Medal
3rd Row	Companion of the Order of the Bath (United Kingdom)	Commander of the Order of the British Empire (United Kingdom)	Chevalier of the Legion of Honor (France)	Croix de Guerre 1939–1945 with Palm (France)
