= Cutler Park =

State park in Needham, Massachusetts

Cutler Park Reservation
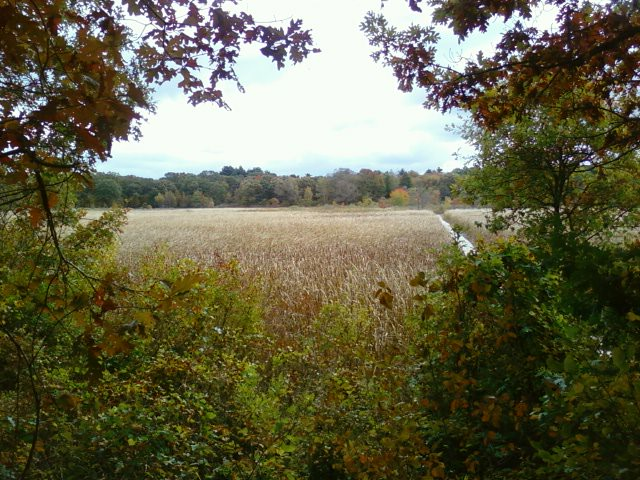
- A boardwalk crossing the marsh at the southern end of the park

- Location within Massachusetts Location within the United States
- Location: Needham, Massachusetts, United States
- Coordinates: 42°17′05″N 71°11′36″W
- Area: 772 acres (312 ha)
- Elevation: 95 ft (29 m)
- Established: 1962
- Named for: State Senator Leslie B. Cutler
- Administrator: Massachusetts Department of Conservation and Recreation
- Website: Official website

Cutler Park Reservation is a state-owned nature preserve and public recreation area that lies between Route 128/I-95 and the Charles River in Needham, Massachusetts. The state park's 772 acres (312 ha) contain the largest remaining freshwater marsh on the middle Charles River. Parts of its major trail run directly through the marsh via boardwalks; over 100 species of birds have been sighted here. The park is part of a plan by the Town of Needham to connect 18 public areas by 35 proposed trails. It is managed by the Massachusetts Department of Conservation and Recreation.

== History ==
Along the west side of Kendrick Pond remains the imprint where soil was removed in the 19th century to fill the area now known as the Back Bay in Boston. An extension of the railroad was added so the soil could be transported into Boston. Some of the old tracks are visible near the north entrance of the park on Kendrick Street. The large marsh in the park is not natural, but rather was created by flooding from the Silk Mill Dam in Newton Upper Falls in the 1890s. These wet areas were used in the past for wells and irrigation, and remains of filter ponds, ditches, and water systems are still present. In 1962 the park was named for State Senator Leslie B. Cutler.

== Geography ==
The bulk of Cutler Park falls within the borders of Needham, Massachusetts. The southern end is part of Dedham; and the park also holds the strip of land on the Newton/Boston side of the Charles River running from Nahanton Street, Newton, south to the City of Boston's Millennium Park (part of West Roxbury). Much of the park's area is marsh or wetland, while forest makes up the rest and bears most of the trails. In two sections, the Blue Heron Trail bears foot and bicycle traffic through the marsh on wooden boardwalks. At the park's north end, a trail goes around Kendrick Pond (also called Cutler Pond). A railroad line, used primarily by the MBTA Commuter Rail, runs roughly east–west on a raised right-of-way through the southern half of the park. A trail runs adjacent to the right-of-way the entire width of the park, and a tunnel under the railroad provides access across it.

== Activities and amenities ==
The park contains trails suitable for walking, hiking, bird watching, mountain biking, and cross-country skiing. Challenging singletracks for mountain bikers are found between the pond and Route 128. Fishing and canoeing are also options.

As the park is very close to Interstate 95, there is pervasive traffic noise in much of the park.

== Gallery ==
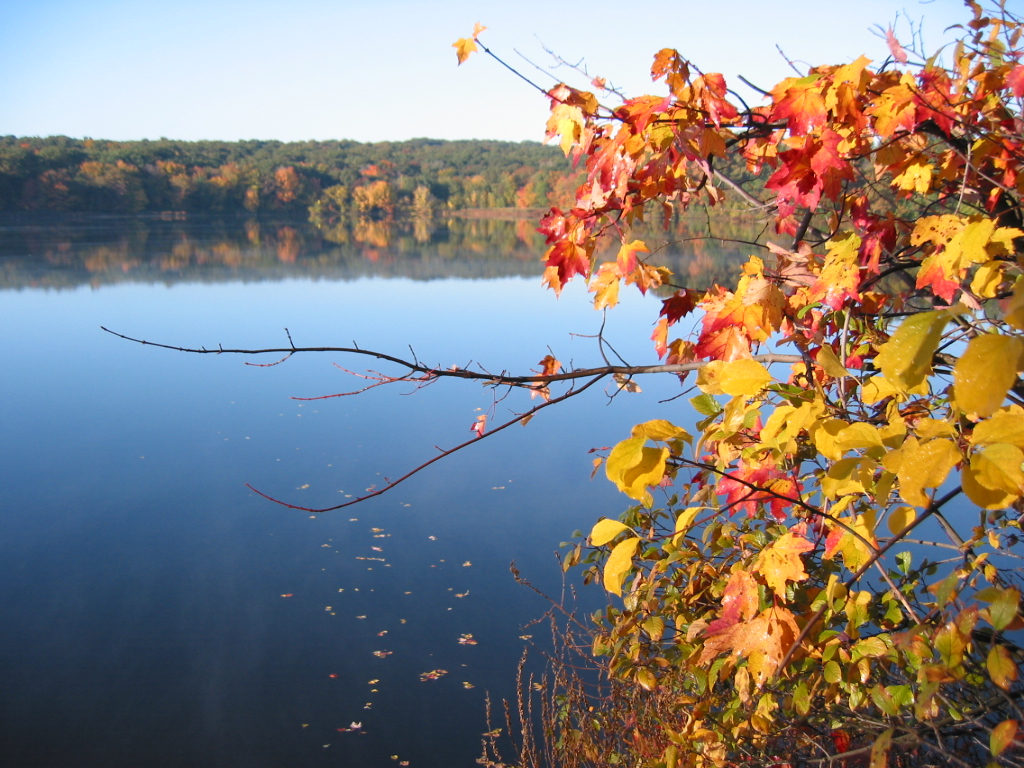
Cutler Pond

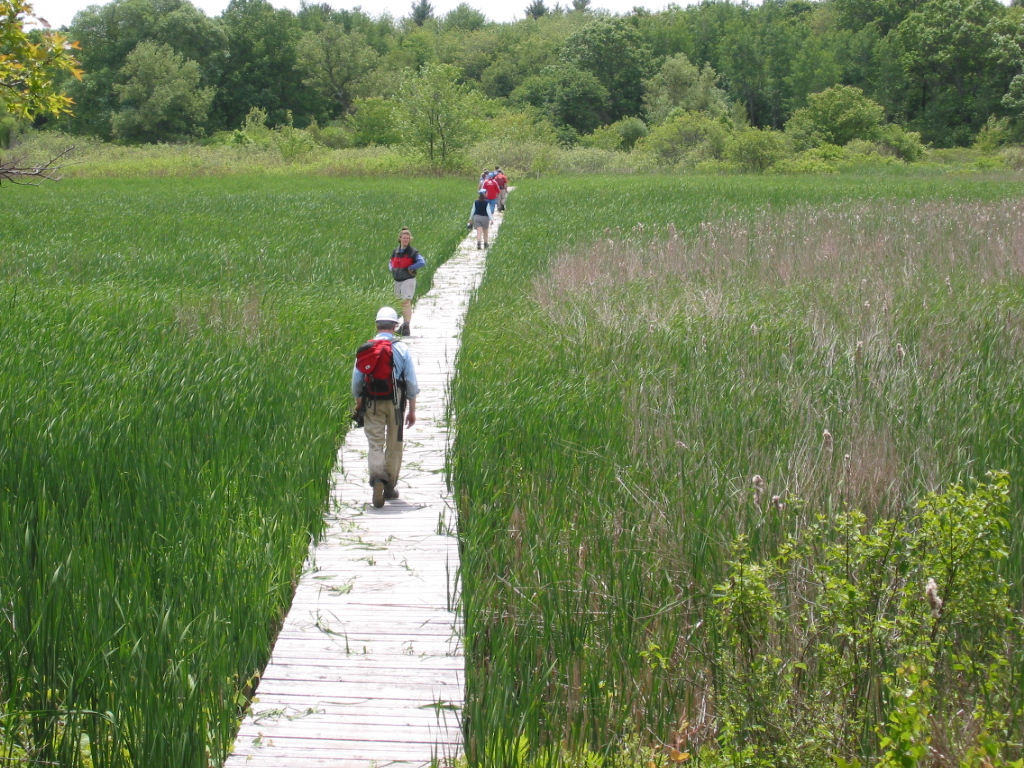
Boardwalk across Great Plain

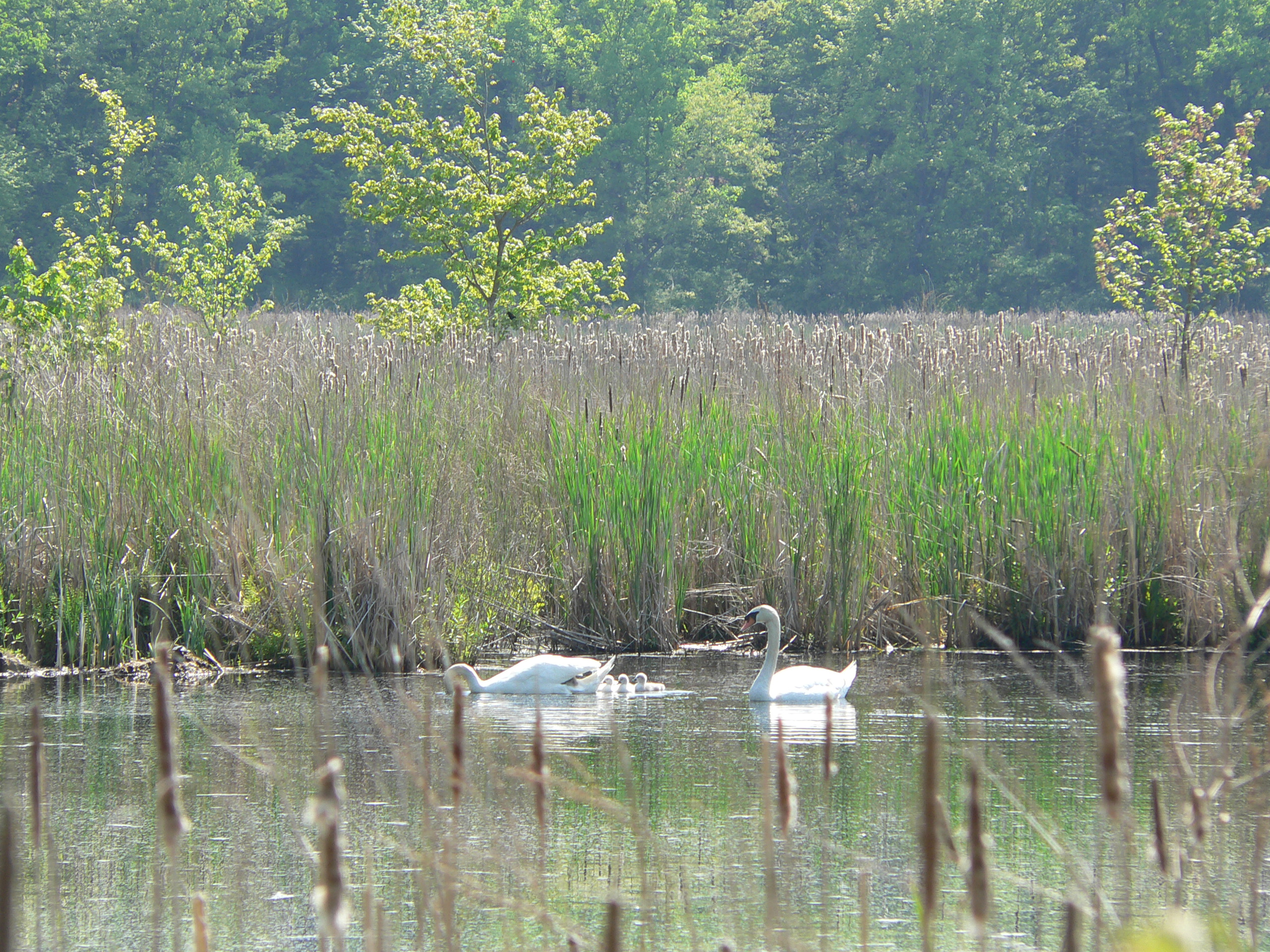
Swans in Cutler Pond

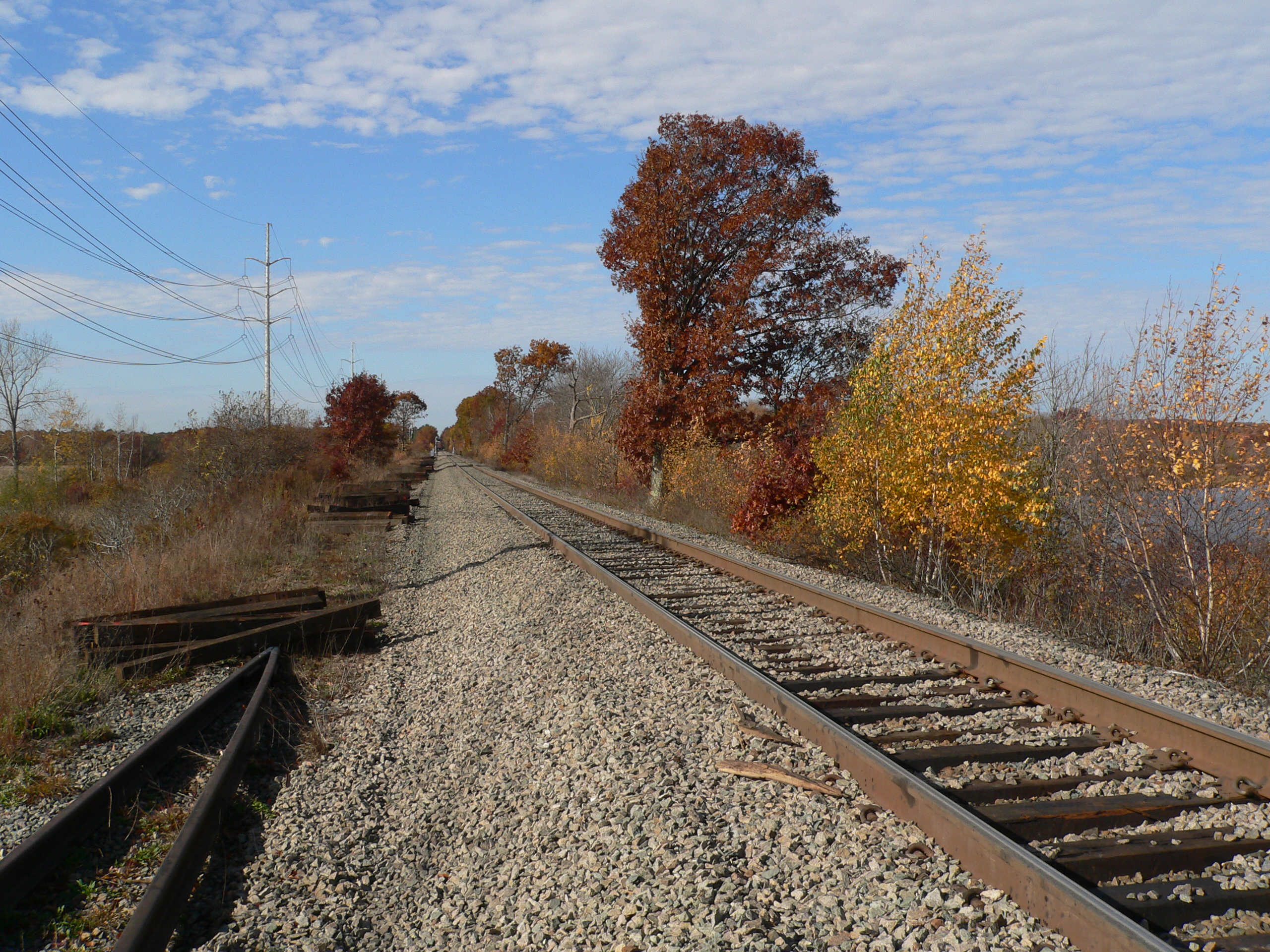
MBTA commuter tracks through park

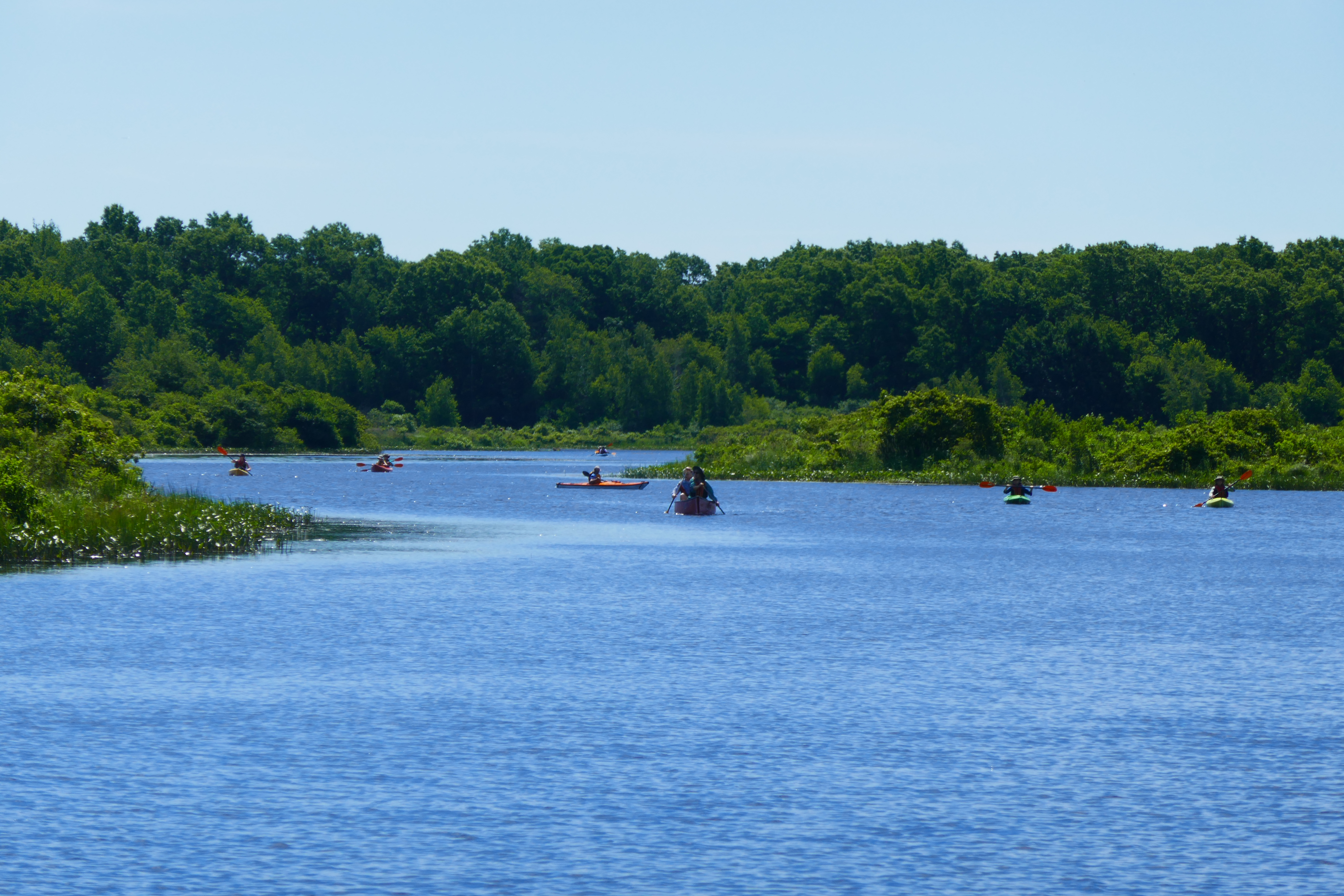
Boaters in Charles River adjacent to park

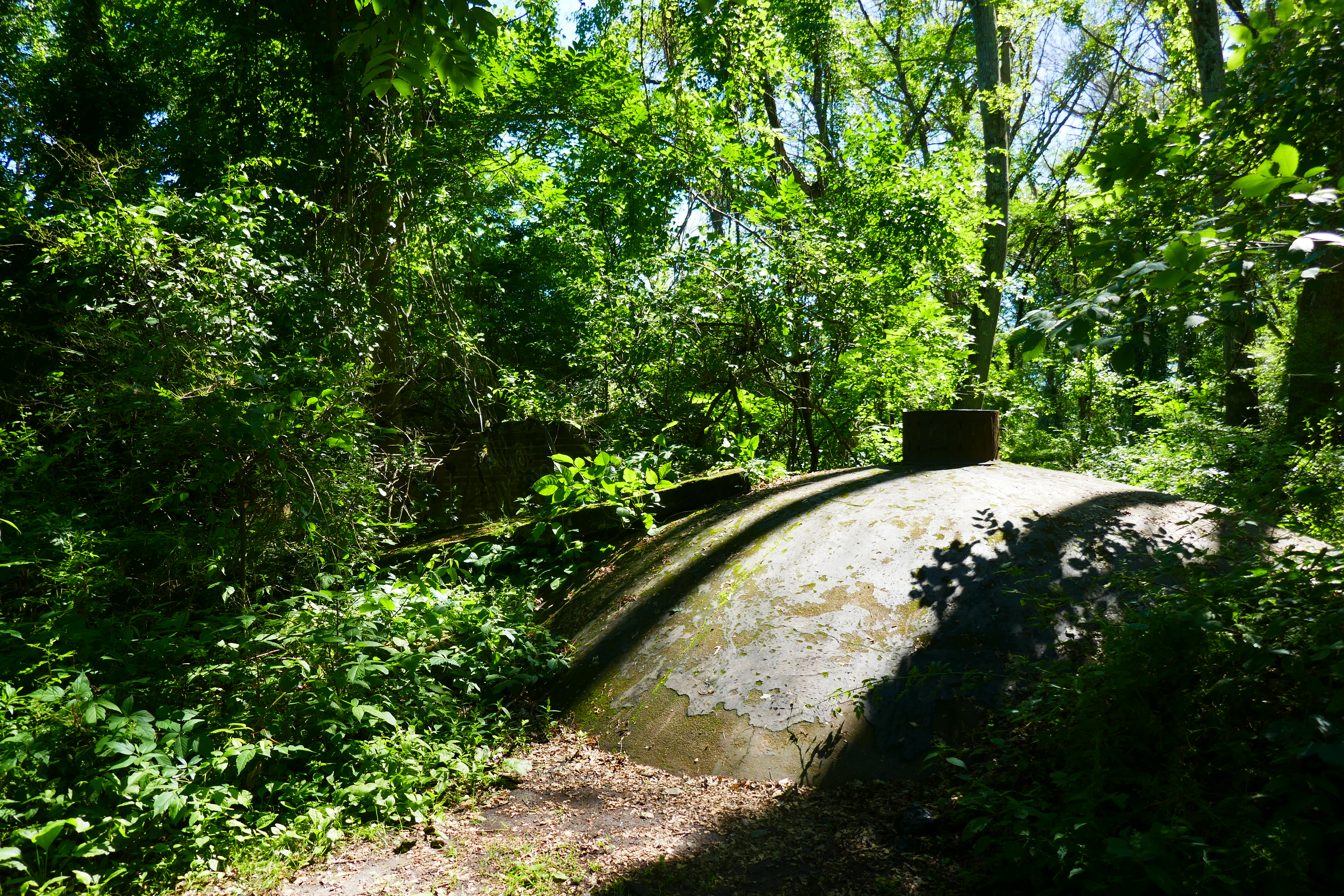
Remains of old water supply facilities

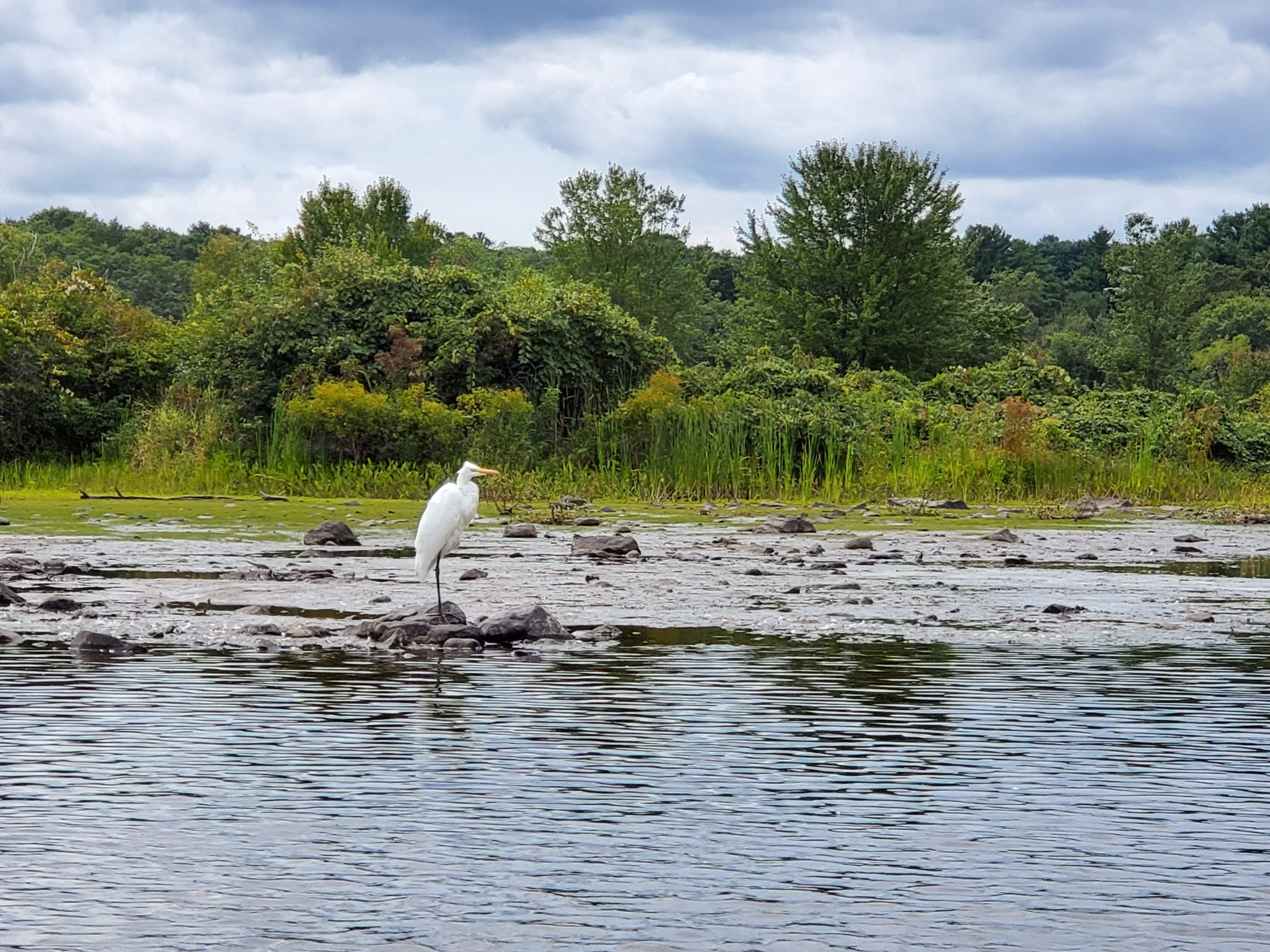
Egret in the Charles River at Cutler Park
