= Roger W. Cutler =

American athlete and naval officer

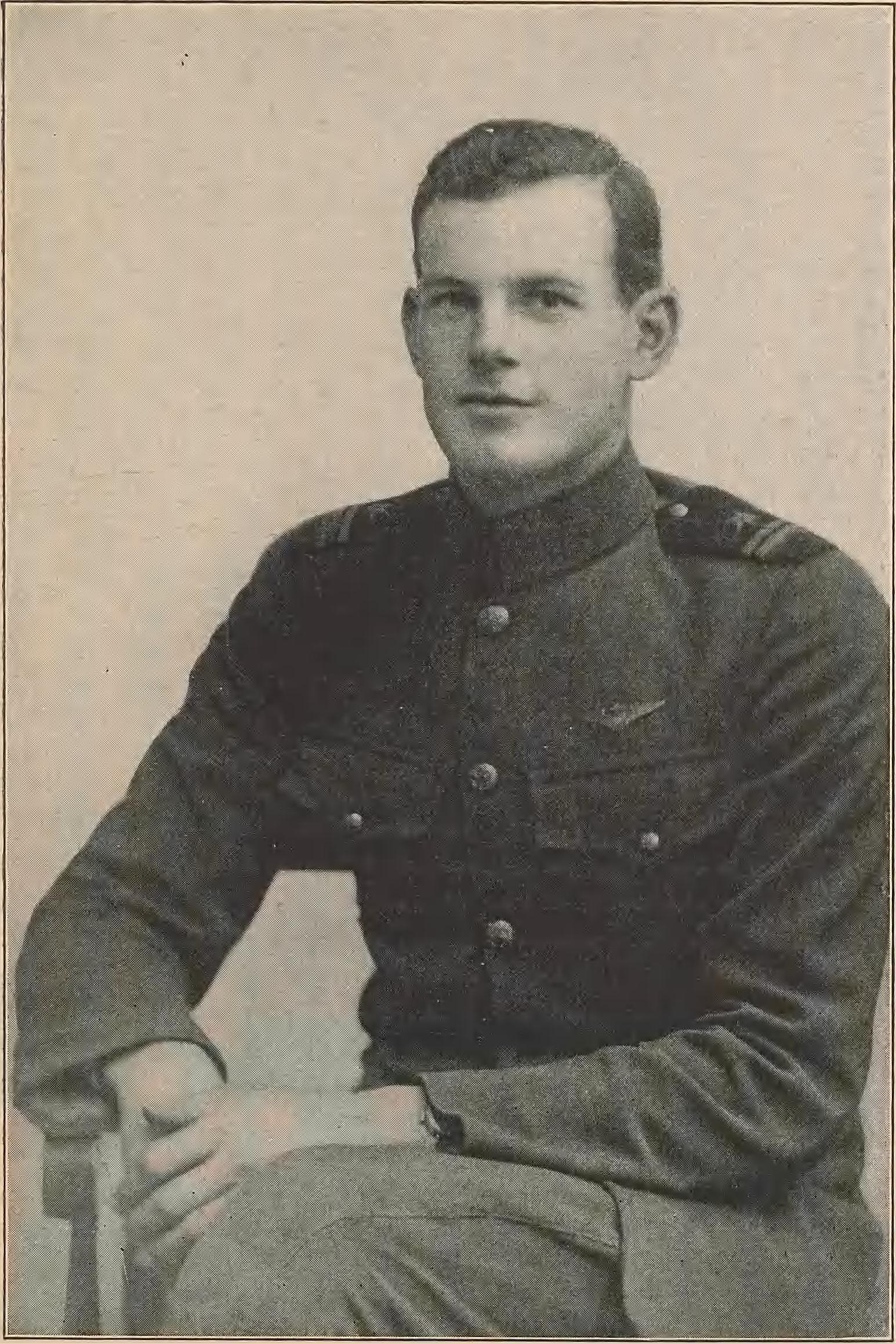
- Born: November 3, 1889; Brookline, Massachusetts
- Died: November 30, 1963 (aged 74); Greenville, South Carolina
- Relatives: BG Elliott Cutler, brother BG Robert Cutler, brother MAJ Johnny Cutler, brother LT Robert B. Cutler, son MAJ Roger W. Cutler Jr., son Leslie Bradley Cutler, wife BG Elliott C. Cutler Jr., nephew
- Military career
- Allegiance: United States of America
- Branch: United States Navy
- Rank: Vice admiral
- Conflicts: Guadalcanal; New Georgia; Bougainville; Green Islands; Emirau; Hollandia; Guam; Lingayen Gulf; Okinawa
- Awards: Silver Star; Bronze Star

Roger Wilson Cutler (November 3, 1889 – November 30, 1963) was an American athlete and naval officer who served in World War I and World War II.

== Early life ==
Cutler was born on November 3, 1889, in Brookline, Massachusetts. He was one of five sons born to George C. and Mary F. Wilson Cutler. His brothers were Elliott Carr Cutler, a professor at the Harvard Medical School and a surgeon, Robert Cutler, the first National Security Advisor, Johnny Cutler, noted Harvard quarterback, and George C. Cutler Jr.

== Athletic career ==
Cutler attended Harvard College, where he was a member of the crew and swim teams. During his sophomore year he became a member of the varsity crew, which was captained by his brother Elliott. He became captain of the Harvard crew in 1911. After graduating from Harvard, Cutler was a member of the Union Boat Club and competed in the 1914 Henley Royal Regatta.

In 1925, Cutler made it to the finals of the U.S. Amateur Tennis Championship, but lost to Jay Gould in three sets. It was Gould's 18th straight title. He was eliminated in the second round of the 1926 tournament by W. T. Adee. He lost in the 1932 semifinals to G. R. Fearing III. In 1933 he and Clarence C. Pell Jr. made it to the quarterfinals of the U.S. Amateur Doubles Championship.

== Marriages ==
On December 14, 1912, Cutler married Leslie Bradley. The couple had four children, two of whom (Robert and Roger Jr.) competed in rowing in the 1936 Summer Olympics. Leslie Bradley Cutler divorced her husband on December 17, 1928, in Reno, Nevada, on the charge of desertion.

On May 1, 1931, Cutler married Edith Cryder, widow of Frederick Lothrop Ames Jr. and one of the famous "Cryder triplets". Edith Cutler died on January 10, 1954.

== Military career ==
=== World War I ===
In September 1916, Cutler served as a radio operator in a naval cruise attached to submarine chasers in Newport, Rhode Island. On March 21, 1917, he enlisted in the US Naval Reserve Force and served on Submarine Patrol No. 56. On September 15, 1917, he was transferred to the Naval Aviation Service. He trained at the Naval Air Station Squantum and was attached to the Naval Air Stations in Norfolk and Pensacola before he was commissioned as an ensign on March 15, 1918. On May 30, 1918, he was commissioned as a Lieutenant (junior grade) and stationed oversees at U.S. Naval Air Station Killingholme. On July 19, 1918, Cutler dropped the bomb which destroyed SM UB-110. He was appointed senior squadron commander at Killingholme in October 1918 and promoted to Lieutenant the following month. He was assigned to inactive duty on January 15, 1919.

=== World War II ===
Cutler reentered the Navy in September 1940 as commander of the cadet regiment at the Naval Air Station Jacksonville. In December 1942 he was transferred to the amphibious forces.

In January 1943, Cutler began duty in the Pacific Theatre. He was the commander of LST Group 13 and was the commander of the first landing ship tank in the war. He served through eleven invasions; Guadalcanal, Russell Islands, Woodlark Island, New Georgia, Bougainville, Green Islands, Emirau, Hollandia, Guam, Lingayen Gulf, and Okinawa. During these campaigns, Cutler commanded 107 direct air, 10 submarine, and 4 artillery attacks. In 1945 he was awarded a Silver Star in lieu of a second Bronze Star Medal for meritorious service as commander of six echelons of tank landing ships during the Solomon Islands campaign. He was promoted to captain while on terminal leave and released to inactive duty in August 1945.

In November 1945, Cutler was promoted to Commodore in the United States Naval Reserve. He retired from the reserve with the rank of Vice admiral.

== Business career ==
Cutler began his professional career in the lumber business in Canada and Boston. He later enter the textile field in Boston and Greenville, South Carolina. Cutler died on November 30, 1963, in Greenville, South Carolina.
