= William Harding Jackson =

American administrator, lawyer, and investment banker (1901–1971)

William Jackson
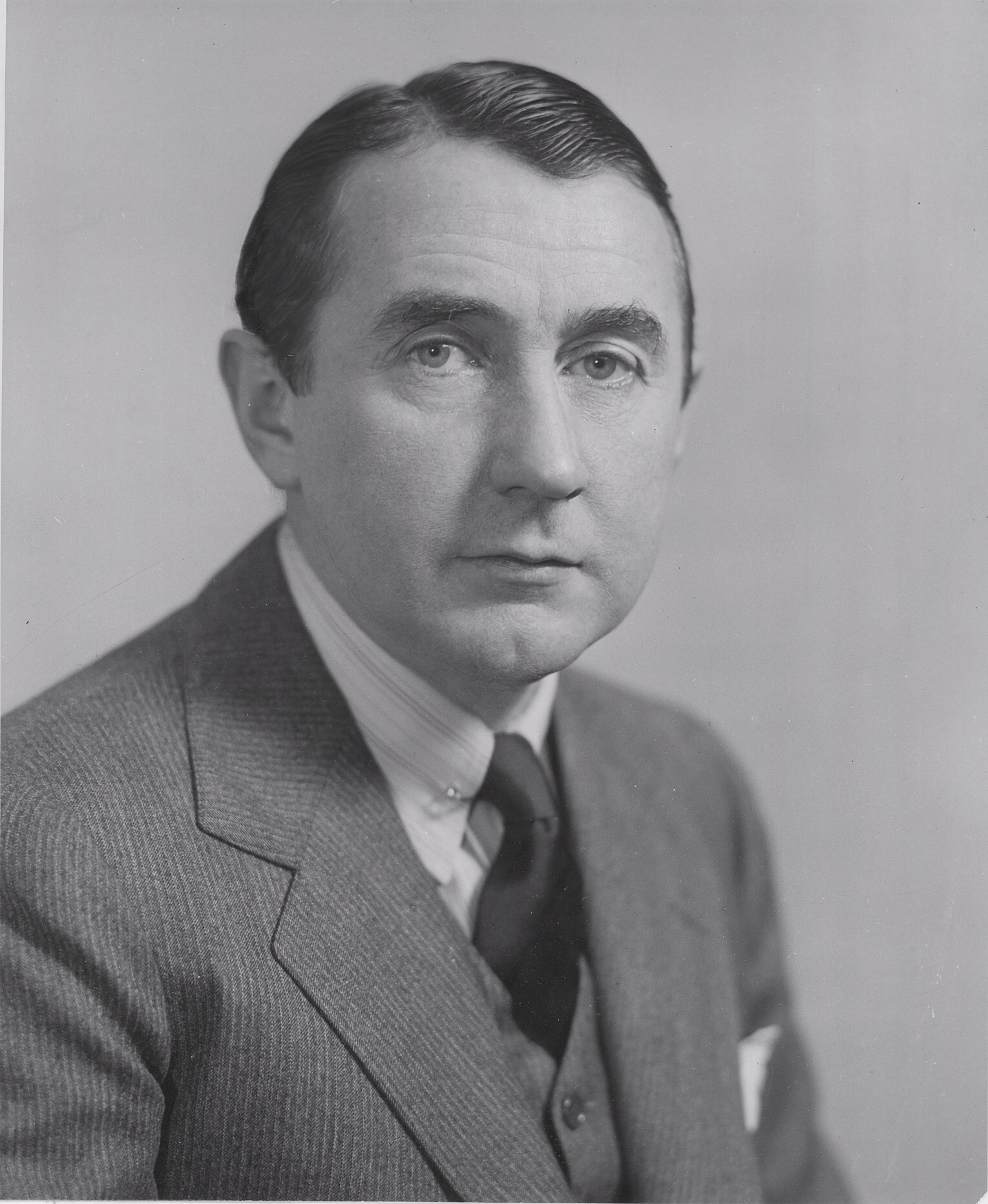

United States National Security Advisor
- Acting
- In office September 1, 1956 – January 7, 1957
- President: Dwight D. Eisenhower
- Preceded by: Dillon Anderson
- Succeeded by: Robert Cutler

Deputy Director of Central Intelligence
- In office October 7, 1950 – August 3, 1951
- President: Harry S. Truman
- Preceded by: Edwin Wright
- Succeeded by: Allen Dulles

Personal details
- Born: March 25, 1901 Belle Meade, Tennessee, U.S.
- Died: September 28, 1971 (aged 70) Tucson, Arizona, U.S.
- Party: Republican
- Spouses: Elizabeth Lyman Rice (m. 1929; div. 1946) Mary Keating (m. 1951; div. 1965): Irma Hanley
- Children: 3, including Bruce
- Education: Princeton University (BA); Harvard University (LLB)

William Harding Jackson (March 25, 1901 – September 28, 1971) was an American civilian administrator, New York lawyer, and investment banker who served as Deputy Director of the Central Intelligence Agency. Jackson also served for several months under President Dwight D. Eisenhower as Acting United States National Security Advisor from 1956 to 1957.

== Early life ==
William Harding Jackson was born on March 25, 1901, on the Belle Meade Plantation, in Belle Meade, Tennessee, near Nashville, Tennessee. He was named after his father William Harding Jackson (1874–1903), who died when he was two years old. His mother was Anne Davis Richardson (1877–1954). (After her husband's death, she married Maxwell Stevenson of Hempstead, New York).

Jackson attended the Fay School in Boston and St. Mark's School, an Episcopal Preparatory school in Southborough, Massachusetts. He received his undergraduate Bachelor of Arts degree (B.A.) from Princeton University (1924) and his LL.B. from Harvard Law School (1928).

== Career ==
In 1928, Jackson joined the New York law firm of Cadwalader, Wickersham & Taft. In 1929 he became an Associate of Beekman, Bogue & Clark. Following the stock market crash of 1929, Jackson moved to the business and financial interest law firm of Carter, Ledyard & Milburn, where he became a full partner in 1934.

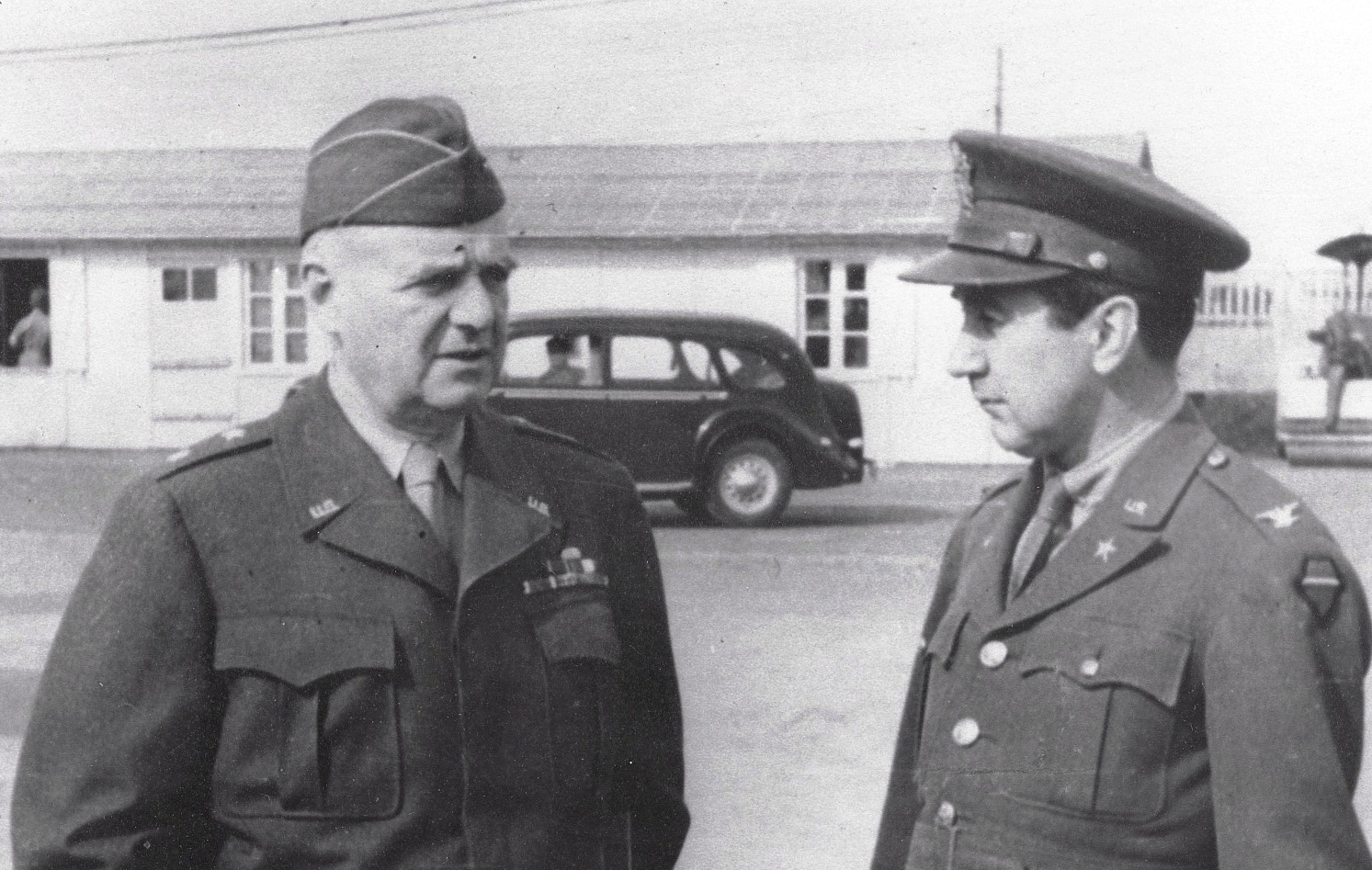
Brig. Gen. William J. Donovan, Director of the OSS, and Jackson (right) in April 1945

During World War II, Jackson served in the United States Army (6 March 1942 – 7 July 1945) as an intelligence officer, graduating from the Army-Air Force (USAAF) Air Combat Intelligence School at Harrisburg, Pennsylvania. He was assigned as an A-2 Assistant Intelligence officer, HQ 1st Bomber Command at 90 Church Street in New York (close to his law office), which immediately became the USAAF Anti-Submarine Command. Jackson was the principal author (along with investment banker Alexander Standish and Harold B. Ingersoll) of the USAAF Bay of Biscay Intelligence Estimate, calling for the attack on Nazi U-boats at their source on the coast of France. This was a significant turning point for the Battle of the Atlantic.

After graduation from Harrisburg in June 1942, Jackson was promoted to Major and brought into the War Department by Secretary Henry L. Stimson, where he became General Staff (Chief of Secret Intelligence reporting to General George C. Marshall from the European Theater of Operations (ETO) at COSSAC headquarters) with the cover title Chief of G-2 intelligence for First Army Group (FUSAG). After training on the Enigma codes at Bletchley Park, UK, he became the senior ULTRA Special Counter-Intelligence Units (SCIU) team leader for all US armies in the ETO.

Jackson achieved the rank of lieutenant colonel, and was assigned by Gen. Hap Arnold to the planning staff of Brig. Gen. Harold George, who had just taken over the USAAF Air Transport Command (ATC). He was listed as the Adjutant General for the ATC European Wing that ferried more than 7,000 U.S. aircraft to Britain during WW II. He received recognition for work rebuilding or expanding air fields in the United Kingdom for American aircraft and creating an expanded communications network for top secret secured communications (again, with Standish and Ingersoll). By summer of 1943, he was given the 'cover title' Assistant Attache for Air, stationed at the US Embassy under Ambassador Gil Winant near Grosvenor Square, next to the Office of Strategic Services (OSS). Shortly thereafter he was promoted to full colonel and appointed G-2 intelligence chief at FUSAG headquarters in London's West End to work on Operation Bodyguard, the massive deception plan to make the Nazis believe the D-Day assault (Operation Overlord) would come from Scandinavia in the north and at Pas-de-Calais under the command of Gen. George S. Patton, at the narrowest point of the English Channel. He worked closely with Gen. T. J. Betts, Deputy G-2 Supreme Headquarters Allied Expeditionary Force (SHAEF) and then Colonel Edwin L. Sibert (G-2) at Headquarters, 1st Army located in Bristol.

After the successful D-Day feint, Jackson was made head of all OSS X-2 Special Counter-Intelligence Units (SCIU) in the ETO, traveling with Twelfth Army Group's forward EAGLE TAC headquarters to Luxembourg on General Omar Bradley's staff. During the "Battle of the Bulge" in Dec-Jan 1945 (in addition to his duties with ULTRA and SCIU teams), on January 1, 1945, during the middle of heated battle, Jackson was named Deputy G-2 for all U.S. armies at Twelfth Army Group.

Decorations—For service to his country and the people of Europe, Jackson was awarded the Bronze Star Medal, the Legion of Merit with one Oak Leaf Cluster (OLC), and the Belgian Croix de Guerre. He is believed to be the only US Army officer below the rank of general to receive both the French Legion of Honor and Croix de Guerre with Palm.

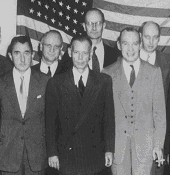
CIA Change of Command, October 7, 1950 (front row from left to right): incoming Deputy Director William Harding Jackson, incoming Director General Walter Bedell Smith and outgoing Director Admiral Roscoe Hillenkoetter

Prior to discharge from the Army and OSS, Jackson was assigned the task of studying the British Secret Intelligence Service. The study took four months working in London with MI5, MI6 and Sir Anthony Eden to complete a report for Gen. Marshall and Gen. Donovan on June 14, 1945. On November 14, 1945, at the request of then SecNav James Forrestal, William Harding Jackson submitted his own plan for a new central intelligence agency as an alternative to General Donovan's plan.

After World War II, Jackson resigned from Carter, Ledyard & Milburn to become an investment banker and the 'Managing Partner' (1947–1955) for J.H. Whitney & Co. of New York.

In 1948, George F. Kennan proposed that control over the government's directorate for political warfare should be "answerable" to the Secretary of State, suggesting that "one man must be boss;" and suggesting further, that the Director of Central Intelligence and the Agency should get "out of the business of covert psychological operations". Kennan took the discussion to Allen W. Dulles, then in private law practice in New York, thinking Dulles would be the logical choice to head the new agency at State. Some believe this started an inter-agency squabble over just who would control intelligence among the military-industrial and civilian intelligence complex. National Security Council (NSC) executive director, Adm. Sidney Souers, appointed Jackson on February 13 to serve on the NSC's Intelligence Survey Group with Allen Dulles and Mathias Correa (an aide to then Sec. of Defense James Forrestal) for the purpose of analyzing departmental practices and inter-agency coordination. The Survey Group, known as the Dulles, Jackson, Correa Committee or Dulles Group, submitted its final report on February 28, 1949. It was a scathing criticism of CIA and its operations under Director Roscoe H. Hillenkoetter, which resulted in the removal of several key persons at CIA and, eventually, the removal of Hillenkoetter.

On July 18, 1950, the new Secretary of Defense, Louis Johnson, and General Omar Bradley sent a letter to President Truman nominating William Harding Jackson for Director of Central Intelligence to replace Hillenkoetter. Having known of Jackson's background, Truman added a short note to the letter and sent it to his White House aide, Donald S. Dawson, saying "...Don: Let's look into this. Tell Mr. [Averell] Harriman what we are doing. If this works out, we'll forget Gen. Smith."

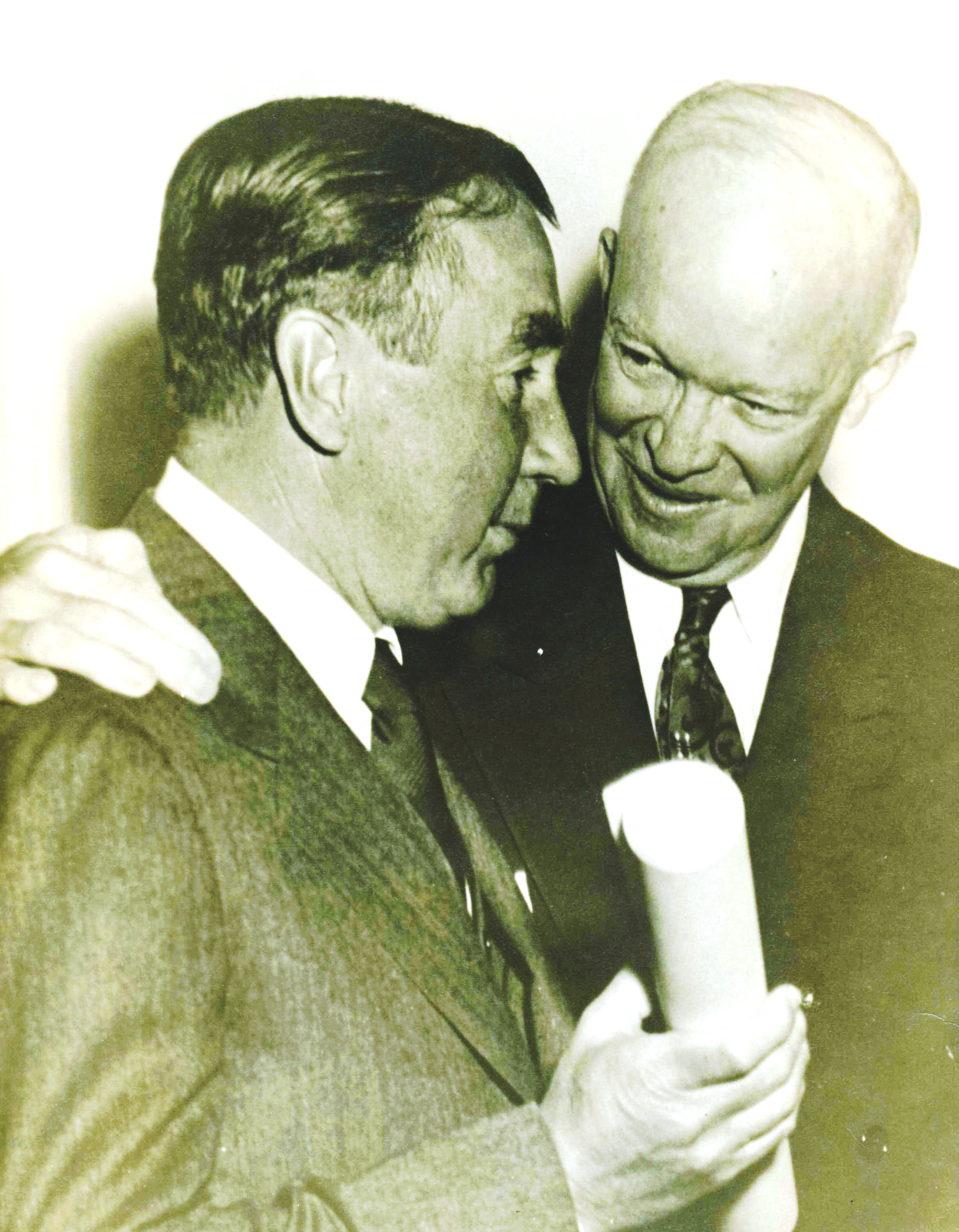
White House, March 1, 1956: William Harding Jackson, U.S. National Security Advisor and President Dwight D. Eisenhower

General Walter Bedell Smith did not want the job of DCI and tried to beg off on health issues, repeatedly. When Jackson declined because of philanthropic and business commitments in New York, Truman is said to have all but issued a direct order as commander-in-chief to General Smith, that he would become the next DCI. Smith turned to Bill Jackson as his nominee for Deputy Director of Central Intelligence to reorganize the Agency - with particular emphasis on covert activities, psychological warfare, and building a professional career Agency.

Jackson was appointed Deputy Director of the Central Intelligence Agency on August 18, 1950, and sworn in October 7. He was the first Deputy Director of Central Intelligence (DDCI) to serve under Walter Bedell Smith (DCI), former Ambassador to the Soviet Union (1945–46) and former World War II four-star General. Smith and Jackson brought Allen W. Dulles to CIA under contract as Deputy Director/Plans (clandestine activities) in early 1951. After completing the reorganization in accordance with adoption of the Dulles Report and NSC-50, and Jackson's resignation in August 1951, Allen Dulles was promoted to DDCI to replace Jackson, later, replacing Smith as DCI in 1953. Jackson remained a contract special adviser to the DCI through both the Smith and Dulles directorships. During the Eisenhower Administration, Bill Jackson is listed by the 'White House Staff' publication and by the CIA as being a 'Special Adviser' and 'Senior Consultant to the Director of Central Intelligence' (from 1951 to 1955).

In 1953, Jackson was appointed Chairman of President Eisenhower's Committee on International Information Activities, often known inside the Beltway as the Jackson Committee (1953–1954) which led to creation of the US Information Agency (USIA). While employed as managing director at J. H. Whitney & Co., Jackson was named 'Special Assistant to the Secretary of State' John Foster Dulles to attend the 1955 Big Four talks in Geneva. In December 1955 Jackson resigned from J. H. Whitney & Co. In February 1956 Jackson was appointed special assistant to President Eisenhower for psychological warfare. He succeeded Nelson Rockefeller who had resigned in December. On 1 March Jackson was appointed by Eisenhower as Special Assistant to the President for Foreign Affairs to "assist in the coordination and timing of the execution of foreign policies involving more than one department or agency. He will represent the President on the Operations Coordinating Board (as Vice Chairman) and will attende meetings of the Cabinet and the National Security Council." President Eisenhower appointed Jackson to additional responsibilities serving as Acting United States National Security Advisor from September 1, 1956, until January 7, 1957.

== Personal life ==
Jackson's first wife, Elizabeth Lyman (married 1929) was the ex-wife of Thomas Rice of Dover; she brought two children Thomas Rice, Jr. and Lyman Rice to their marriage. Jackson and Elizabeth had two more sons, William Harding Jackson, Jr. and Richard Lee Jackson. They divorced in 1946 after Jackson returned from World War II.

At age 39, Jackson was elected the youngest president to serve (1940–1949) on the board of directors of The Society of the New York Hospital, one of America's oldest hospitals founded by King George III in 1771, and was nominated to the National Academy of Sciences. After the war, Jackson was elected to the boards of Bankers Trust, the John Hay Whitney Foundation, the New York Hospital for Special Surgery, and the Menninger Foundation.

In 1951, Jackson married Mary Pitcairn, the daughter of Norman B. Pitcairn, a former President of the Wabash Railroad. They had two sons together: Bruce P. Jackson and Howell E. Jackson. After they divorced, around 1965, Mary married another New York lawyer, Wendell Davis, who died in 1972. She married a third time to U.S. Senator and former Ambassador to Israel, Kenneth Keating; thus, becoming Mary Pitcairn Jackson Davis Keating.

== Death ==
Jackson died on September 28, 1971, in Tucson, Arizona, at the age of 70.

Government offices
Preceded by Edwin Wright	Deputy Director of Central Intelligence; 1950–1951	Succeeded by Allen Dulles
Political offices
Preceded by Dillon Anderson	National Security Advisor; Acting; 1956–1957	Succeeded by Robert Cutler
