= George Walder =

American football player and coach

Playing career
- 1905–1908: Cornell
- Positions: Halfback, fullback

Coaching career (HC unless noted)
- 1909: Cornell

Head coaching record
- Overall: 3–4–1

Accomplishments and honors

Awards
- 2× Second-team All-American (1906, 1908)

George Henry Walder was an American football player and coach. He served as the head football coach at his alma mater, Cornell University, in 1909. Walder was a standout player at Cornell, playing as a halfback, fullback.

== Head coaching record ==
Year	Team	Overall	Conference	Standing	Bowl/playoffs
Cornell Big Red (Independent) (1909)
1909	Cornell	3–4–1			
Cornell:		3–4–1			
Total:		3–4–1			
