= Ed Lange (American football) =

American football and baseball player

Profile
- Position: Quarterback

Personal information
- Born: October 12, 1887
- Died: Unknown

Career information
- College: Navy (1908)

Awards and highlights
- Consensus All-American (1908)

Edward Charles Lange (October 12, 1887 – ?) was an American football player. He was appointed to the United States Naval Academy in 1905 from Medford, Wisconsin. While attending the Naval Academy, he played at the quarterback position for the Navy Midshipmen football team and was a consensus first-team selection on the 1908 College Football All-America Team. Lange also played on the Navy Midshipmen baseball team from 1907 to 1909.
