= Percy Northcroft =

American football player and Naval officer (1886–1967)

Profile
- Position: Tackle

Personal information
- Born: August 31, 1886
- Died: December 20, 1967 (aged 81)

Career information
- College: Navy (1905–1908)

Awards and highlights
- Consensus All-American (1908); Second-team All-American (1906)

Percy Wilfred Northcroft (August 31, 1886 – December 20, 1967) was an American football player and Naval officer. He played tackle for the Navy Midshipmen football team from 1905 to 1908 and was selected as an All-American in 1906 and 1908. He later served as an officer in the U.S. Navy.

== Biography ==
Northcroft was a native of Pawtucket, Rhode Island. He enrolled at the United States Naval Academy at Annapolis, Maryland in June 1905 and played at the tackle position for the Navy Midshipmen football team from 1905 to 1908. Northcroft also competed in the weight events for the Academy's track and field team and was elected as captain of the track team in May 1908.

In 1906, Northcroft helped lead the Navy football team to a record of 8–2–2 and a 10–0 victory over Army. In the season-ending win over Army, Northcroft kicked a field goal that was variously reported to have been from the 42-yard line or the 48-yard line. One observer later recalled that Northcroft's long kick was made with the ball placed near the sideline and he "kicked the ball at least 20 feet above the goal posts and clear up into the end stand." The 1906 victory broke a four-game winning streak for Army. After the 1906 season, Northcroft was selected as a third-team All-American by Walter Camp for Collier's Weekly and a second-team All-American by Caspar Whitney for The Outing Magazine.

As a junior in 1907, Northcroft helped lead Navy to a record of 9–2–1, including eight shutouts. The 1907 Navy team also won its second consecutive victory over Army in the last game of the season. Following the 1907 season, Northcroft was elected by his fellow Midshipmen as the captain of the 1908 Navy football team.

As a senior in 1908, the Navy team with Northcroft as captain compiled a record of 9–2–1 and outscored its opponents by a combined score of 218 to 38. At the end of the 1908 season, Northcroft was selected as a first-team All-American by the Chicago Inter-Ocean and a third-team All-American by Walter Camp.

In 1909, the Naval Academy tested the strength of more than 800 midshipmen at the academy using a "Kellogg testing machine"; Northcroft was determined to be "the strong man of the whole academy" with a "multiple" of 9,275 pounds. He also had his name engraved on the Naval Academy's Thompson trophy cup in 1909 "for having had the best influence for the betterment of athletics during the past year."

After graduating from the Naval Academy, Northcroft spent his career in the U.S. Navy. In January 1917, he was assigned to the destroyer force of the Navy's Atlantic Fleet, serving as a lieutenant on the O'Brien-class destroyer USS McDougal. In June 1917, following the entry of the United States into World War I, Northcroft was promoted from the rank of lieutenant (junior grade) to full lieutenant. He continued to serve through World War II advancing through the ranks of commander and Captain.

Northcroft was also inducted into the U.S. Naval Academy's Hall of Fame for his contributions to the football teams.

Northcroft died in 1967 at age 81. He was buried at the Golden Gate National Cemetery in San Bruno, California.
