= Hunter Scarlett =

American football player and ophthalmologist (1885–1954)

- Scarlett during his college career at Penn

Penn Quakers
- Position: End
- Class: Graduate

Personal information
- Born: October 16, 1885; Erie, Pennsylvania, U.S.
- Died: December 23, 1954 (aged 69); Philadelphia, Pennsylvania, U.S.
- Listed height: 5 ft 10 in (1.78 m)
- Listed weight: 168 lb (76 kg)

Career information
- High school: Erie
- College: Penn Quakers (1904–1908)

Awards and highlights
- 2× National champion (1904, 1908); Consensus All-American (1908); Second-team All-American (1907)
- College Football Hall of Fame (Class of 1970)

Other information
- Military career
- Allegiance: United States; France
- Branch: U.S. Army; French Armed Forces
- Service years: 1914-1916 (France); 1918 (United States)
- Units: American Ambulance (1914-1916); Whitney War Hospital (1914-1916); U. S. Hospital No. 11 (1918)
- Conflicts: World War I First Battle of the Marne
- Awards: French Medal of Recognition

Hunter Watt Scarlett (October 16, 1885 – December 23, 1954) was a notable ophthalmologist, and is best known for his college football career for the Penn Quakers from 1904 to 1908. During World War I, he worked in both French and American military hospitals. In 1970, he was elected into the College Football Hall of Fame.

== Biography ==
=== Background ===
Hunter was born in Erie Pennsylvania on October 16, 1885. He was the seventh son of John and Nancy Bell Scarlett. His mother was born near Cookstown in County Tyrone, in what is now Northern Ireland, while his father was born in Liverpool, England.

After graduating from Erie High School in 1902, Hunter enrolled in the University of Pennsylvania.

=== College football career ===
He played four years of varsity football at Penn, as an end. In an era in which players were more likely to become injured, Hunter was never taken out of a game due to an injury. In 1908, he and halfback Bill Hollenback led the Quakers to an 11-0-1 record and the National Championship. During the season, the Quakers out-scored their opponents, 215-18, and their perfect record was marred only by a 6-6 tie against the Carlisle Indians.

Hunter was awarded consensus All-American honors that season. Hollenback lavished praise upon Scarlett after the 1908 campaign, saying: "He's one of college football's greatest ends. He's a superlative defensive end, quick to get down-field on punts and an exceptional diagnostician."

=== Early medical career ===
Scarlett graduated from the University of Pennsylvania School of Medicine in 1911. He then interned at the Pennsylvania Hospital. A year later, he was appointed Chief Resident of the American Hospital of Paris. There he began the study of ophthalmology under Dr. Victor Morax, who was then the Professor of Ophthalmology at Lariboisière Hospital, and later became his assistant. One of Scarlett's articles on a form of diplobacillus "not yet described," causing corneal infection, was titled "Diplobacilli scarletti".

=== World War I ===
On August 1, 1914, World War I broke out in Europe; The American Hospital of Paris, with the encouragement of the French Government opened a second, much larger military hospital in the Lyceé Pastuer school building located at Neuilly-sur-Seine in Paris Dr. Scarlett then became one of the many founders of this hospital. The American Ambulance Hospital was financed by donations from the wealthy American Colony of Paris as well as contributions from the United States. Dr. Scarlett was appointed as an ophthalmologist to the American Ambulance and held that position until 1916.

He was also appointed Ophthalmologist to the Whitney War Hospital (American Ambulance Hospital B), located on the Marne River. The Whitney Hospital was entirely financed by Gertrude Vanderbilt Whitney, wife of wealthy financier Harry Payne Whitney and Great-Grand Daughter of "Commodore" Cornelius Vanderbilt. The Whitney Hospital which was a branch of the American Ambulance Hospital on the Marne battlefield, during this time. In order to operate at the Whitney War Hospital, he was usually forced to leave Paris at sundown in an unlighted automobile. His vehicle could only be seen by a low red cross on the radiator and he had to drive between the battle's shell holes and debris. Operating was done there at night with inadequate lighting and equipment, and his return trip to Paris was made just before dawn. Dr. Scarlett was also ophthalmologist to the "Phare", a Paris branch of the New York Light House for the Blind, caring for patients blinded by the war.

In 1916, after two years of acting chief of two war hospitals and assistant at a third, Scarlett was taken seriously ill with what appeared to be meningitis, but was later thought to be sleeping sickness. At this time, he had been caring for a group was a part of General Gallieni's "taxicab army" that held the front line at the Marne river, during the first weeks of the war. He was sent back to the United States and after six months of rest, he began practicing again in Philadelphia.

In 1918, he volunteered in the United States Army and served at U. S. Hospital No. 11, in Cape May, New Jersey, as an assistant ophthalmologist. In 1920, the French government awarded him the Médaille de la Reconnaissance française.

=== Post-war activities ===
In 1920, Scarlett was appointed ophthalmologist at Bryn Mawr Hospital and held a similar appointment at Pennsylvania Hospital. Finally in March 1939, he was forced to retire due to health issues. During this time he wrote many articles for several American ophthalmological journals.

Hunter Scarlett died on December 23, 1954, at age 69.
