= Bernard O'Rourke =

American football player and coach (1886–1941)

Profile
- Position: Guard

Personal information
- Born: March 1886; Syracuse, New York, U.S.
- Died: June 12, 1941 (aged 55); Norristown, Pennsylvania, U.S.

Career information
- College: Cornell University

Career history
- 1908: Cornell

Awards and highlights
- Consensus All-American (1908); Second-team All-American (1907)

Bernard John O'Rourke (March 1886 – June 12, 1941) was an American football player and coach. He played college football at Cornell University and was a consensus first-team selection to the 1908 College Football All-America Team.

O'Rourke was born in 1886 and raised in Syracuse, New York. He attended Cornell University from 1907 to 1909 and played on the Cornell Big Red football team. He was selected as a consensus first-team guard on the 1908 College Football All-America Team. While attending Cornell, he was a member of and Dunstan, Aleph Samach, and Rod and Bob.

After graduating from Cornell, he coached the Cornell football team for three years and also coached the football team at Johns Hopkins University.

After World War I, O'Rourke moved to Norristown, Pennsylvania, where he lived for the rest of his life and was married to Medora Altemus. He operated a contracting firm with his brother and, in 1935, became the Works Progress Administration administrator for Montgomery County, Pennsylvania. He also worked as superintendent of the Montgomery County highways and as postmaster of Norristown. He died in Norristown in June 1941, aged 55.
