= Allie Miller =

American football player and coach (1886–1959)

Biographical details
- Born: June 23, 1886; Lycoming County, Pennsylvania, U.S.
- Died: October 22, 1959; Abington, Pennsylvania, U.S.

Playing career
- 1907–1909: Penn
- Position: Quarterback

Coaching career (HC unless noted)
- 1912: Penn (freshmen)
- 1913: Haverford School (PA)
- 1914–1916: Tome School (MD)
- 1918: Tome School (MD)
- 1919: Penn (assistant)
- 1920: Washington & Jefferson (backfield)
- 1921–1922: Villanova
- 1924–1925: Washington & Jefferson (backfield)

Head coaching record
- Overall: 11–4–3

Accomplishments and honors

Championships
- National (1908)

Awards
- Third-team All-American (1908)

Albert Crist Miller (June 23, 1886 – October 22, 1959) was an American football player and coach. He served as the head football coach at Villanova College—now known as Villanova University—from 1921 to 1922, compiling a record of 11–4–3. Miller played college football at the University of Pennsylvania from 1907 to 1909.

== Career ==
Miller was a reserve quarterback for Penn in 1907. In 1908, he filled in for starter Charles Keinath during the Carnegie Tech and Michigan games. Keinath left the game early in the season finale against Cornell and Miller scored a 47-yard touchdown to help lead Penn to a 17 to 4 victory. Miller was captain of the 1909 Penn Quakers football team. His younger brother, Heinie Miller, also played at Penn and later became a college football coach.

== Coaching ==
In 1912, Miller was coach of Penn's freshmen football team. The following year he coached the at the Haverford Grammar School. From 1914 to 1916, he was the head coach at the Tome School. Forrest Craver took over as Tome's coach in 1917, but Miller returned the following year. He returned to his alma mater as an assistant in 1919 and was the backfield coach at Washington & Jefferson College in 1920.

Miller became the Villanova Wildcats football coach in 1921. That year, he led the team to its best season in many years, losing only one game. Spalding's Official Foot Ball Guide credited Miller with developing "quite a good team from the mediocre material at his command". The following season, Villanova compiled a 5–3–1 record.

In 1924 and 1925, Miller was the backfield coach at Washington & Jefferson.

== Later life ==
After football, Miller worked as an insurance broker for J. B. Carnett in Philadelphia. He died on October 22, 1959, at Abington Hospital in Abington Township, Montgomery County, Pennsylvania. He was survived by his two sons and one daughter. He was preceded by his wife, Maude Skeene Clarke Miller, who died in 1954.

== Head coaching record ==
Year	Team	Overall	Conference	Standing	Bowl/playoffs
Villanova Wildcats (Independent) (1921–1922)
1921	Villanova	6–1–2			
1922	Villanova	5–3–1			
Villanova:		11–4–3			
Total:		11–4–3			
