= Roger W. Cutler Jr. =

American rower (1916–1986)

- Born: January 13, 1916; Boston
- Died: May 31, 1986 (aged 70); Needham, Massachusetts
- Occupation: Rower
- Spouse(s): Elise Russell (m. 1937; died 1958) Elizabeth Dieterich (m. 1959)

Roger Wilson Cutler Jr. (January 13, 1916 – May 31, 1986) was an American rower who competed in the 1936 Summer Olympics in Berlin. He also served as an assistant state attorney general and held executive positions at State Street Bank and Peter Bent Brigham Hospital.

== Early life ==
Cutler was born in Boston to Roger W. and Leslie Bradley Cutler. His father was a noted rower who had been captain of the Harvard Crew in 1911 and competed in the 1914 Henley Royal Regatta as a member of the Union Boat Club.

== Athletic career ==
Cutler attended the Noble & Greenough School, but later transferred to Kent School. He did not make the Kent varsity crew as a starter, but in 1932 went to the Henley Royal Regatta as a substitute. He went on to Harvard College. During his sophomore year (1935) he was promoted from No. 2 on the junior varsity crew to varsity pace setter. He returned to the JV squad in 1936, but was promoted to varsity No 2. in May. That same year, Cutler was also a member of a Riverside Boat Club crew (which consisted of himself, his brother Robert, William Haskins, J. Paul Austin, and Edward Bennett) that sought to make the U.S. Olympic team. On July 4, 1936, The Riverside Boat Club qualified for the Olympics by defeating the Washington Huskies. In the Olympic men's coxed four, the Riverside Boat Club was eliminated in the semi-finals.

Cutler graduated from Harvard College in 1937 and Harvard Law School in 1940.

== Personal life ==
On July 1, 1937, Cutler married Elsie Russell of Chestnut Hill, Massachusetts and Keene, New Hampshire. She was a niece of U.S. Senator Leverett Saltonstall. The couple had two daughters. On March 17, 1958, a widespread search for Elsie Cutler was made after she vanished from the Austen Riggs Center, a psychiatric hospital in Stockbridge, Massachusetts. Her body was found in the Housatonic River on July 11, 1958. The cause of death was ruled to be drowning and declared to be "presumably a suicide" by the medical examiner.

In 1959, Cutler married Elizabeth Dieterich of Omaha.

On March 14, 1964, Cutler's daughter Clare was killed in an automobile accident in Pleasant Valley, New York. She was 20 years old.

== Professional life ==
During World War II, Cutler was a major on the staff of General Harry J. Collins, commander of the 42nd "Rainbow" Infantry Division. He earned a Bronze Star. After the war, Cutler served as an assistant attorney general under Massachusetts Attorney General Clarence A. Barnes. He then moved to New York City, where he held various banking positions. In 1954 he returned to Boston as vice president of the State Street Bank's trust division. In 1956, Cutler served as chairman of a citywide Red Cross Drive.

In 1966, Cutler retired from State Street Bank to become director of development and public relations for Peter Bent Brigham Hospital, which was in the midst of expansions. He had previously served as a trustee and secretary to the board at Brigham since the 1950s and two of his uncles (Elliott and Robert Cutler) also held positions there. Cutler retired from Brigham in 1971.

Cutler died on May 30, 1986, in Needham, Massachusetts, at the age of 70.
