= Robert S. Cutler =

American marketing executive

- Born: February 17, 1956 (age 69); Philadelphia, Pennsylvania
- Occupation: CEO
- Spouse: Marida Cutler (divorced 2009)

Robert (Bob) S. Cutler is an American marketing executive and the founder of Creative Consumer Concepts (C3), a company that produces toys and other entertainment products for the restaurant sector.

== Biography ==
Bob Cutler was born in Philadelphia, Pennsylvania on February 17, 1956. His father Norman ran a manufacturing business, where Cutler worked from the age of 13. Cutler's duties ranged from sweeping the floor to running production machines.

Cutler studied at Cheltenham High School, one of the oldest public high schools in Pennsylvania.

After graduating, Cutler moved to Denver, Colorado to attend the University of Denver. Cutler received a BA in Sociology in 1978. Upon graduation, Cutler sold greeting cards and gift items for Hallmark in Seattle and Kansas City.

== Creative Consumer Concepts ==
In 1987, Cutler founded Creative Consumer Concepts (C3) in Overland Park, Kansas. C3 creates family marketing programs for casual dining and fast food restaurants

== Personal life ==
Cutler married his second wife Marida in 1999. They divorced in 2009.

Cutler's hobbies include photography, yoga, weight training and competitive Latin rhythm ballroom dance.

== Philanthropy ==
Philanthropy plays a significant role in Cutler's life. He encourages every associate of C3 to give 40 hours a year on company time to a community service project or organization of their choice.

He has held leadership roles with United Jewish Charities, the Hyman Brand Hebrew Academy, the Center for Leadership and Learning, the Greater Kansas City Jewish Federation and the American Israeli Public Affairs Committee or AIPAC
