= William Goebel (American football) =

American football player (1887–1960)

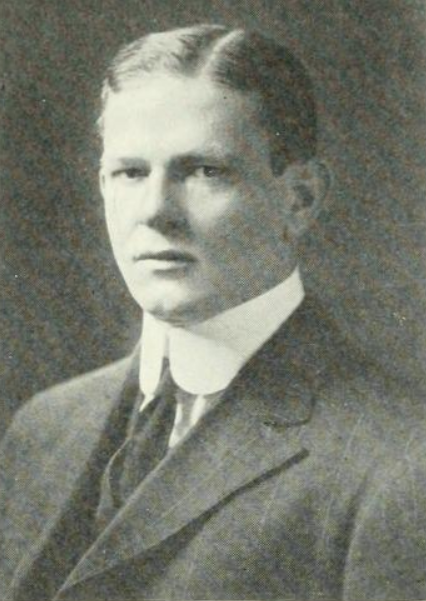
- Goebel, c. 1910

Profile
- Position: Guard

Personal information
- Born: June 24, 1887; Cincinnati, Ohio, U.S.
- Died: February 15, 1960 (aged 72)

Career information
- College: Yale (1907–1909)

Awards and highlights
- 2× National champion (1907, 1909); Consensus All-American (1908); Third-team All-American (1907)

William Arthur Goebel (June 24, 1887 – February 15, 1960) was an American football player. He played college football at Yale University and was a consensus selection at the guard position on the 1908 College Football All-America Team.

Goebel was born in Cincinnati, Ohio, in 1887. He was the son of Justus Goebel, the owner of a wholesale and retail carpet business known as Lowry & Goebel. Goebel received his preparatory education at Union High School in Phoenix, Arizona, and in private studies in Cincinnati. He attended college at Yale University, where he was a member of the football, track and wrestling teams. As a guard for the Yale Bulldogs football team, he was a consensus first-team selection for the 1908 College Football All-America Team. He also won wrestling championships in 1907 and 1909 and was elected president of the Wrestling Association during his senior year. He was a member of Delta Kappa Epsilon while at Yale.

He died in 1960.
