= Charles Nourse =

American football player and lawyer (1888–1974)

Harvard Crimson
- Position: Center

Personal information
- Born: February 24, 1888; New York City, New York, U.S.
- Died: April 25, 1974 (aged 86); Manhattan, New York, U.S.
- Listed height: 6 ft 0 in (1.83 m)
- Listed weight: 197 lb (89 kg)

Career information
- High school: St. Paul's School
- College: Harvard (1905–1909)

Awards and highlights
- Consensus All-American (1908)

Charles Joseph Nourse (February 24, 1888 – April 25, 1974) was an American football player and lawyer. He played college football at Harvard University and was a consensus first-team selection to the 1908 College Football All-America Team.

== Early life ==
Nourse was born in 1888, a son of Charles J. Nourse of New York. He attended preparatory school at St. Paul's School in Concord, New Hampshire.

=== College football career ===
As an undergraduate, Nourse studied law at Harvard College from 1905 to 1909. He was six feet tall and weighed 197 pounds while at Harvard. He played on the freshman football team in 1906 and on the Harvard Crimson football team in 1907 and 1908. After the 1908 season, he was selected as a consensus first-team center on the 1908 College Football All-America Team.

== Career ==
After receiving his bachelor's degree from Harvard in 1909, Nourse spent three years at Columbia Law School]. He was editor of the Columbia Law Review and graduated in 1912. After his admission to the bar, Nourse, practiced law, initially with the law with the firm of Winthrop & Stimson in New York City, and later with the firm of Prince & Burlingame.

During World War I, Nourse served in the 31st Field Artillery, attaining the rank of captain, and serving under Henry L. Stimson, who later became the U.S. Secretary of State and Secretary of War. After the war, Nourse returned to the practice of law. From 1927 to 1970, he was with the Wall Street law firm of Winthrop, Stimson, Putnam & Roberts and its predecessor firm, Burlingame, Nourse & Pettit. His clients included Bristol-Myers Company, the New York Trust Company, the Fulton Trust Company and the Safe Deposit Company of New York.

== Personal life ==
Nourse was married in June 1922 to Margaret Lawrence Strong in a ceremony at Short Hills, New Jersey. Margaret, a daughter of James Remsen Strong, was attended by her sister, the former Charlotte Remsen Strong, wife of banker Schuyler Van Vechten. In his later years, Nourse lived on East 67th Street in Manhattan and also at Oyster Bay, Long Island.

Nourse died in April 1974 at 115 East 167th Street, his home in Manhattan.
