= Frederick Tibbott =

American football player and novelist (1885–1965)

Profile
- Position: Halfback

Personal information
- Born: December 11, 1885; Indianapolis, Indiana, U.S.
- Died: August 20, 1965 (aged 79)

Career information
- High school: Germantown Academy
- College: Princeton (1907–1908)

Awards and highlights
- Consensus All-American (1908)

Frederick Merrill Tibbott (December 11, 1885 – August 20, 1965) was an American college football player and novelist. He played football at Princeton University and was a consensus selection at the halfback position on the 1908 College Football All-America Team.

Tibbott was born in Indianapolis, Indiana in 1885, and moved with his family to Philadelphia in 1901. He attended the Germantown Academy, where he was a member of the football, baseball and track teams. He played halfback for the Princeton Tigers football team in 1907 and 1908. In October 1907, he ran 100 yards for a touchdown against Bucknell. In November 1907, Tibbott scored a touchdown and helped Princeton defeat the Carlisle Indians, starring Jim Thorpe, by a 16–0 score. One newspaper wrote of Tibbott's performance against Carlisle: "Tibbott was the slim, wiry Tiger who did most of this work. He played superb football for Princeton on the offense and was a man of might out of all proportion to his bounds."

In 1908, Tibbott was selected as a consensus first-team All-American. He did not receive a degree from Princeton, reportedly due to "trouble with his eyes in senior year."

He left Princeton in December 1908 and worked for the Pennsylvania Railroad, the Panama Mining Company in Nicaragua, the United States Forestry Service in Colorado, the Norfolk & Portsmouth Traction Co., the Virginia Railway & Power Co., and the Emerson Piano Company in Boston. He married Edith Eddy Milliken in 1914 and served with the U.S. Army Engineers in World War I. He was stationed at Camp A. A. Humphreys, Virginia and became a first lieutenant.

After the war, Tibbott moved to Chesterville, Maine, and pursued a career in writing. His work, "Simon Hastings: A Novel Of Maine's North Country" was published in 1942. He also had short stories published in the Saturday Evening Post, among other periodicals. After his first wife died in 1942, Tibbott was remarried to Edith Joanna Hawes. He died in 1965 at age 79.
