= 1908 All-America college football team =

Official list of the best college football players of 1908

1908 Official All-America Selectors

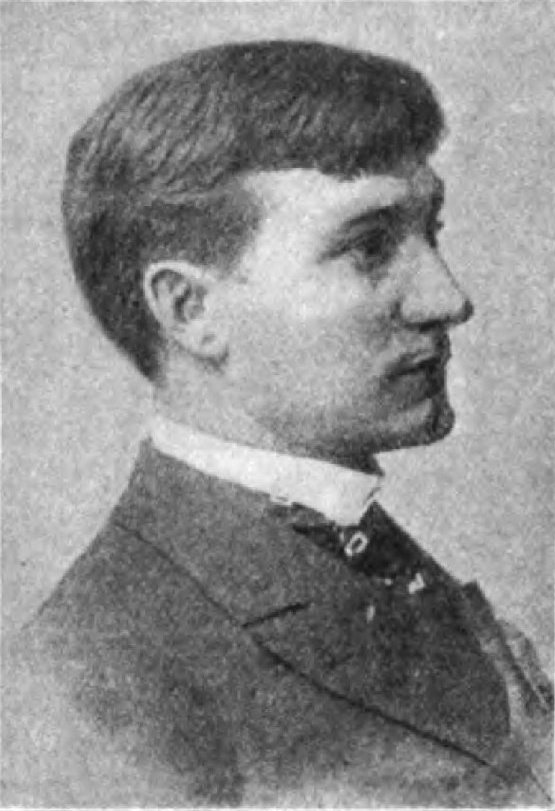
Caspar Whitney

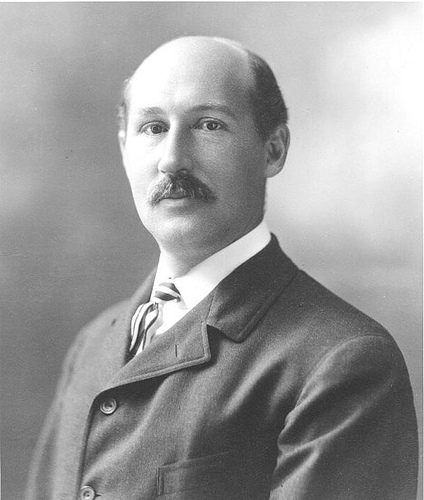
Walter Camp

The 1908 All-America college football team is composed of college football players who were selected as All-Americans for the 1908 college football season. The only two individuals who have been recognized as "official" selectors by the National Collegiate Athletic Association (NCAA) for the 1908 season are Walter Camp and Caspar Whitney, who had originated the All-America college football team 14 years earlier in 1889. Camp's 1908 All-America Team was published in Collier's Weekly, and Whitney's selections were published in Outing magazine.

Many other sports writers, newspapers, coaches and others also selected All-America teams in 1910. The Philadelphia Inquirer published a consensus All-America team based on the first-team All-America selections made by 25 football experts.

== Consensus All-Americans ==
The only two individuals who have been recognized as "official" selectors by the National Collegiate Athletic Association (NCAA) for the 1908 season are Walter Camp and Caspar Whitney, who had originated the All-America college football team 14 years earlier in 1889. In its official listing of "Consensus All-America Selections," the NCAA designates players who were selected by either Camp or Whitney as "consensus" All-Americans. Using this criterion, the NCAA recognizes 16 players as "consensus" All-American for the 1908 football season. The consensus All-Americans are identified in bold on the list below ("All-Americans of 1908").

== All-American selections for 1908 ==
Hunter Scarlett of Penn.

=== Ends ===
- **Hunter Scarlett**, Penn (College Football Hall of Fame) (WC-1; CON-1 [23]; ERB-1 [30]; NYW; PI; FY; TT; NYG; CSM; NYET; BSU; BP; PD; TJ; KCJ; PP; PT; PES; WH; FC)
- **George Schildmiller**, Dartmouth (WC-1; CON-1 [18]; ERB-1 [23]; PI; TT; NYG; NYT; NYET; BSU; BP; PD; PT; PES; CIO; FC)
- Claude Fisher, Syracuse (NYW; FY; TJ; KCJ)
- Frank Dennie, Brown (WC-2; CSM; NHR)
- Lawrence Fairfax Reifsnider, Navy (WC-2)
- Harlan Page, Chicago (WC-3)
- Ronald D. Johnson, Army (WC-3)
- George Kennedy, Dartmouth (NYT; NHR; WH)
- Gilbert Goodwin Browne, Harvard (PP)

=== Tackles ===
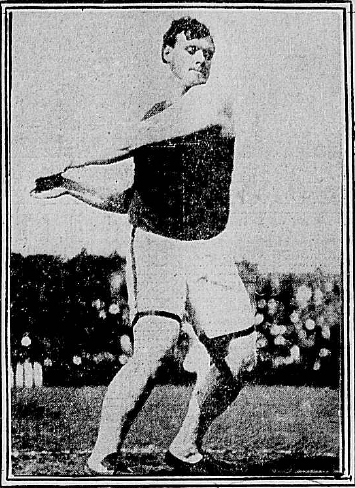
Bill Horr hurling the discus.

- **Hamilton Fish**, Harvard (WC-1; CON-1 [14]; ERB-1 [25]; PI; FY; TT; NYG; CSM; NYT; BSU; BP; KCJ; PT; FC)
- **Bill Horr**, Syracuse (WC-1; CON-2 [9]; NYG; NYET; PD [g]; PES [g])
- **Percy Northcroft**, Navy (WC-3; CIO)
- Dexter Draper, Penn (WC-3; CON-1 [13]; ERB-1 [25]; PI; TT; BSU; BP; PD; NHR; PP; PT; PES; WH; FC)
- Rudolph Siegling, Princeton (WC-2; CON-2 [11]; NYW-1; NYT; BP [g]; PD; TJ; PP; WH; CIO)
- Daniel Pullen, Army (NYW; FY; TJ; KCJ)
- Robert McKay, Harvard (CSM)
- Arthur Brides, Yale (NHR)

=== Guards ===
- **Hamlin Andrus**, Yale (WC-2; CON-1 [13]; ERB-1 [18]; NYW; NYT; NYET; BSU; TJ; KCJ; PT; PES)
- **William Goebel**, Yale (WC-1; CON-1 [16]; PI; FY; TT; NYG; CSM; NYT; PD; NHR; PP; WH; CIO; FC)
- **Bernard O'Rourke**, Cornell (WC-2 [t]; NYET; PES; WH [g])
- **Clark Tobin**, Dartmouth (WC-1; CON-2 [12]; ERB-1 [28]; PI; FY; TT; NYG; CSM; NYET; BSU; BP; KCJ)
- Samuel Hoar, Harvard (WC-3; NYW; TJ; PP)
- Francis Burr, Havard (PT)
- John Messmer, Wisconsin (WC-2)
- Forest Van Hook, Illinois (WC-3)
- Orlo L. Waugh, Syracuse (NHR)
- Edward Rich, Dartmouth (FC)

=== Centers ===
- **Charles Nourse**, Harvard (WC-1; CON-1 [12]; NYG; NYT; CIO [g])
- Germany Schulz, Michigan (College Football Hall of Fame) (CON-2 [9]; ERB-1 [20]; NYW; PI; FY; TT; CSM; NYET; BSU; BP; PD; NHR; TJ; KCJ; PP; PT; PES)
- Wallace Philoon, Army (WC-2; WH; CIO; FC)
- Joseph C. Brusse, Dartmouth (WC-3)

=== Quarterbacks ===
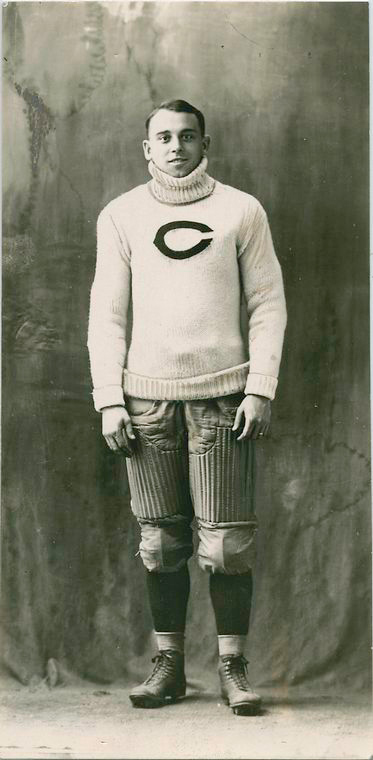
Walter Steffen of Chicago

- **Walter Steffen**, Chicago (College Football Hall of Fame) (WC-1; FY; NYET; PD; NHR; KCJ)
- **Ed Lange**, Navy (CON-1 [12]; TT; NYG; BP; PP; WH; CIO)
- Allie Miller, Penn (WC-3; CON-2 [6]; ERB-1 [20]; PI; BSU; TJ; PT; PES; FC)
- Johnny Cutler, Harvard (WC-2; CSM; NYT)

=== Halfbacks ===
- **Hamilton Corbett**, Harvard (CIO)
- **Bill Hollenback**, Penn (College Football Hall of Fame) (WC-1; CON-1 [21]; ERB-1 [30]; NYW; PI; FY; TT; NYG; NYT; NYET; BSU; BP; PD; TJ; KCJ; PP; PT; PES; WH; FC)
- **Frederick Tibbott**, Princeton (WC-1; CON-1 [21]; ERB-1 [25]; NYW; FY; TT; CSM; NYT; NYET; BSU; BP; NHR; TJ; KCJ; PP; PT; PES; WH; CIO)
- Jim Thorpe, Carlisle (College and Pro Football Hall of Fame) (WC-3; PI)
- Ernest Frederocl Ver Wiebe, Harvard (WC-2; CSM; NHR)
- John W. Mayhew, Brown (WC-2)
- Edward Gray, Amherst (WC-3)

=== Fullbacks ===
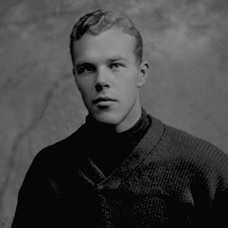
Ted Coy of Yale

- **Ted Coy**, Yale (College Football Hall of Fame) (WC-1; CON-1 [24]; ERB-1 [30]; NYW; PI; FY; TT; NYG; CSM; NYT; NYET; BSU; BP; PD; NHR; TJ; KCJ; PP; PT; PES; WH; CIO [e]; FC)
- George Walder, Cornell (WC-2; CIO; FC; PD [hb])
- George McCaa, Lafayette (WC-3)

=== Key ===
NCAA recognized selectors for 1908

- WC = Collier's Weekly as selected by Walter Camp

Other selectors

- CON = Consensus based on All-American teams selected by 25 football experts; number indicates how many of the 25 experts selected the individual as a first-team All-American; any player with at least 5 of 25 selections is listed hear as a second-team selection: CON-2
- ERB = Composite All-America team selected by E. R. Bushnell based on aggregating the opinions of 30 football critics; number indicates how many of the 30 critics selected the individual as a first-team All-American
- NYW = New York World, selected by former Yale quarterback Tad Jones
- PI = The Philadelphia Inquirer, selected by Franklin
- FY = Fielding H. Yost, football coach of the University of Michigan
- TT = Tom Thorp, former star tackle and captain of Columbia
- NYG = New York Globe
- CSM = The Christian Science Monitor
- NYT = The New York Times
- NYET = New York Evening Telegram
- BSU = Brooklyn Standard Union
- BP = Boston Post
- PD = Pittsburgh Dispatch
- NHR = New Haven Register
- TJ = Tad Jones
- KCJ = Kansas City Journal
- PP = Philadelphia Press
- PT = Philadelphia Times
- PES = Philadelphia Evening Star
- WH = Washington Herald, selected by William Peet
- CIO = Chicago Inter-Ocean
- FC = Fred Crolius

Bold = Consensus All-American

- 1 – First-team selection
- 2 – Second-team selection
- 3 – Third-team selection

== See also ==
- 1908 All-Southern college football team
- 1908 All-Western college football team
