= Johnny Cutler =

American football player (1887–1950)

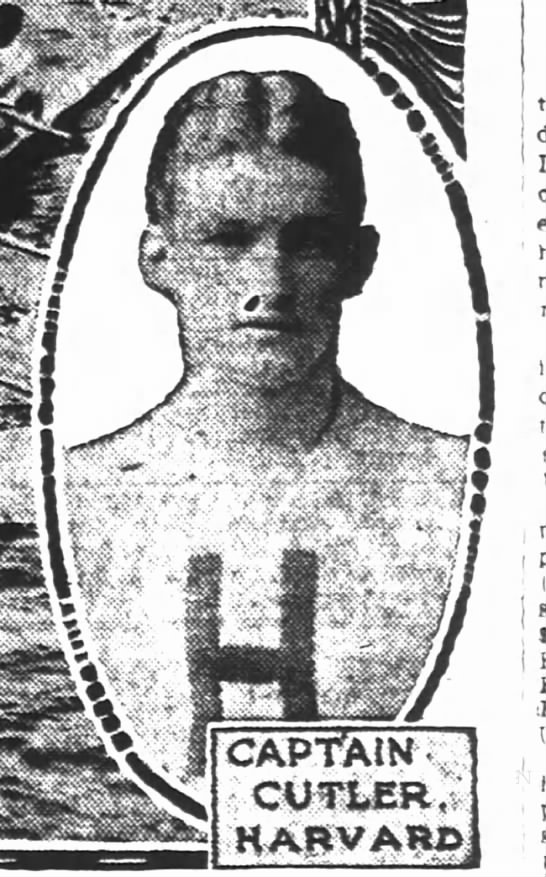
- Cutler c. 1909

Harvard Crimson
- Position: Quarterback

Personal information
- Born: May 12, 1887; Bangor, Maine, U.S.
- Died: March 18, 1950 (aged 62); Manhattan, New York, U.S.

Career information
- College: Harvard (1906–1909)

Awards and highlights
- Second-team All-American (1908)

John Wilson Cutler (May 12, 1887 – March 18, 1950) was an American college football player.

== Early life ==
Cutler was born on May 12, 1887, in Bangor, Maine. He was one of five sons born to George C. and Mary F. Wilson Cutler. His brothers were Elliott Carr Cutler, a professor at the Harvard Medical School and a surgeon, Robert Cutler, the first National Security Advisor, Roger W. Cutler, a U.S. Navy officer and the husband of Leslie Bradley Cutler, and George C. Cutler Jr.

== Playing career ==
Cutler was a prominent quarterback for the Harvard Crimson football team of Harvard University. He was also a member of the rowing team.

He led the 1908 Crimson to a win over Dartmouth. He was selected second-team All-American by Walter Camp.

Cutler served on the Class Day Committee for the Class of 1909, although he did not graduate from Harvard until 1911.

== Personal life ==
Cutler married Rosalind Fish on October 22, 1910, in Garrison, New York. Rosalind was the daughter of Hamilton Fish II and the sister of Hamilton Fish III, future Representative and Cutler's teammate on the 1908 Championship team. The Cutlers had two sons and three daughters.

During World War I, Cutler was a major with the American Expeditionary Forces.

== Business career ==
Cutler worked for Lee, Higginson & Co. and Kissel, Kinnicutt & Co. in Boston until 1920, when he moved to New York and became a partner at E.B. Smith & Co. He later became a member of Smith Barney & Co. During the 1930s, Cutler served as chairman of the investment bankers' division of the Emergency Unemployment Relief Committee. Cutler was a director of a number of enterprises, including IT&T, The Hoover Company, New York Air Brake, R. Hoe & Company, McKesson & Robbins, Ludlum Steel, Grace National Bank, and Roosevelt Field.

He died in New York on March 18, 1950, at the age of 62.
