= Leslie Bradley Cutler =

American politician (1890–1971)

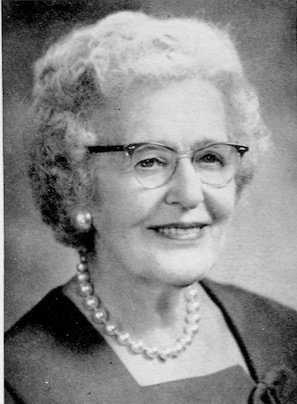

Member of the Massachusetts Senate
- In office 1949–1969
- Preceded by: Mason Sears
- Succeeded by: David H. Locke

Member of the Massachusetts House of Representatives 1st Norfolk district (1939–1943) 6th Norfolk district (1943–1949)
- In office January 4, 1939 – January 5, 1949
- Preceded by: James M. McCracken
- Succeeded by: Harold Putnam

Personal details
- Born: March 24, 1890 Boston
- Died: November 27, 1971 (aged 81) Needham, Massachusetts
- Party: Republican
- Spouse: Roger W. Cutler (1912–1928)
- Children: 4 (including Robert and Roger Jr.)
- Education: Haskell School; Radcliffe College; Massachusetts Institute of Technology

Leslie Bradley Cutler (1890-1971) was an American politician who served in the Massachusetts Senate.

== Early life ==
Cutler was born on March 24, 1890, in Boston. She graduated from the Haskell School, and attended Radcliffe College, and the Massachusetts Institute of Technology. On December 14, 1912 she married Roger W. Cutler, a businessman and United States Navy officer. The couple had four children, two of whom (Robert and Roger Jr.) competed in rowing in the 1936 Summer Olympics. She also raised a nephew after her brother's death in 1921. Cutler divorced her husband on December 17, 1928 in Reno, Nevada on the charge of desertion.

== Political career ==
Cutler began her political career in 1923 when she ran for the Needham, Massachusetts Board of Selectmen. She lost by 57 votes. She ran again in 1924 and won. She was the first woman to hold elected office in Needham and only one of two female selectmen in Massachusetts at the time of her election. She was reelected in 1925 and was chosen to serve as chairman of the board. When the town created a Board of Health in 1927, she chose to serve on it instead of the Board of Selectmen. She would remain on the board until 1967.

Cutler ran unsuccessfully for the Massachusetts House of Representatives in 1928, the first of three losses, before she eventually won in 1938. She served in the Massachusetts House of Representatives from 1939 to 1949 and the Massachusetts Senate from 1949 to 1969. She was the twelfth woman elected to the Massachusetts House of Representatives and the second to be elected to the Senate. Cutler helped the Massachusetts Department of Conservation and Recreation acquire the land for Cutler Park, a state park in Needham.

Cutler died on November 27, 1971, at her home in Needham.

== See also ==
- Massachusetts legislature: 1939, 1941–1942, 1943–1944, 1945–1946, 1947–1948, 1949–1950, 1951–1952, 1955–1956
