= Robert B. Cutler =

American rower (1913–2010)

- Born: November 8, 1913; Needham, Massachusetts
- Died: September 1, 2010 (aged 96); Whitinsville, Massachusetts
- Occupation: Rower
- Spouse: Marion Lawrence (m. 1939)

Robert Bradley Cutler (November 8, 1913 – September 1, 2010) was an American rower who competed in the 1936 Summer Olympics in Berlin. He was also a conspiracy theorist who founded The Conspiracy Museum in Dallas.

== Early life ==
Cutler was born in Charles River, Massachusetts, to Roger W. and Leslie Bradley Cutler. His father was a noted rower who had been captain of the Harvard Crew in 1911 and competed in the 1914 Henley Royal Regatta as a member of the Union Boat Club.

== Athletic career ==
Cutler attended the Noble & Greenough School, where he rowed No. 2 in eights. He went on to Harvard College and the Harvard Graduate School of Design. During his freshman year, Cutler was the No. 2. He stroked the JV boat during his junior year. In 1935, Cutler was promoted to varsity pace setter after team captain Sam Drury was demoted to No. 2 following the Syracuse-Cornell-Tech-Harvard regatta. Cutler graduated from Harvard University in 1935.

In 1936, Cutler was a member of a Riverside Boat Club crew, which consisted of himself, his brother Roger, William Haskins, J. Paul Austin, and Edward Bennett, that sought to make the U.S. Olympic team. On July 4, 1936, The Riverside Boat Club qualified for the Olympics by defeating the Washington Huskies. In the Olympic men's coxed four, the Riverside Boat Club was eliminated in the semi-finals.

== Personal life ==
On April 15, 1939, Cutler married Marion Lawrence in Groton, Massachusetts. The ceremony was officiated by Endicott Peabody and William Appleton Lawrence. Marion Cutler was granted a divorce on September 25, 1944, on grounds of cruel and abusive treatment. She was granted custody of their two children. On November 24, 1945, he married Claire Demmer in San Francisco. The couple had two children and resided in Beverly Farms, Massachusetts, Grafton, Massachusetts, and Whitinsville, Massachusetts.

== Later life ==
In 1953, Cutler was accused of using his mother's influence as a state senator to pressure the Massachusetts Airport Management Board into giving his architecture firm a contract for a control tower at Logan Airport. Chairman George A. McLaughlin presented as evidence a drawing of a pie with a segment marked "$25,000 survey" removed from it with the caption "Commissioner, you know, we like our pie a la mode". Massachusetts Attorney General George Fingold cleared Cutler of any wrongdoing, stating that Cutler's sketch was an attempt at humor.

Cutler researched extensively the assassinations of John F. Kennedy, Martin Luther King Jr. and Robert F. Kennedy. He was known for constructing one of the most detailed maps of Dealey Plaza. On April 4, 1995, Cutler opened The Conspiracy Museum to promote his theories, which included the belief that Kennedy was shot and poisoned by three men, one of whom used a gas-powered umbrella pistol to fire a dart with a paralyzing agent at Kennedy to immobilize his muscles and make him a "sitting duck" for an assassination. He also believed that Lee Harvey Oswald was actually a C.I.A. spy named Alek Hidell. Gerald Posner, author of Case Closed: Lee Harvey Oswald and the Assassination of JFK, told the New York Times that "even among conspiracy theorists [Cutler is] not in the mainstream."

Professionally, Cutler worked as an architect. During World War II, he served as a lieutenant in the United States Navy. Cutler remained athletically active after the Olympics and was still rowing in Boston in the mid-1990s. He was a member of the Riverside Boat Club from 1921 until his death in 2010. Cutler died on September 1, 2010, aged 96, in Whitinsville, Massachusetts.
