= List of Penn State Nittany Lions head football coaches =

List of head football coaches for the Penn State Nittany Lions

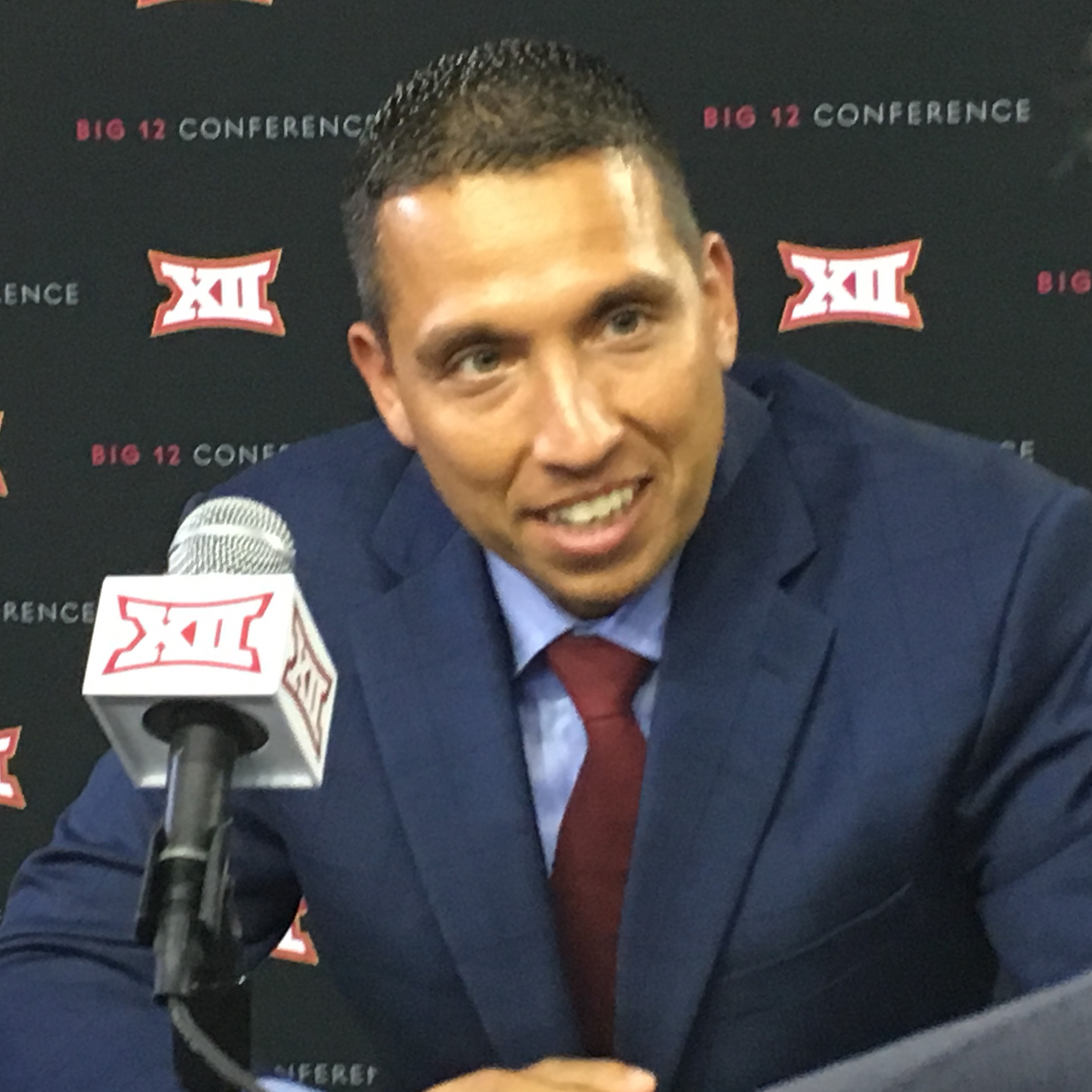
Matt Campbell is the current head coach of the Nittany Lions.

The Penn State Nittany Lions college football team represents Pennsylvania State University in the Big Ten Conference (Big 10), as part of the NCAA Division I Football Bowl Subdivision. The program has had 17 head coaches, and 2 interim head coaches, since it began play during the 1887 season. Matt Campbell will be the current head coach beginning in the 2026 season.

Six coaches have led Penn State in postseason bowl games: Hugo Bezdek, Bob Higgins, Rip Engle, Joe Paterno, Tom Bradley, and James Franklin. Two of those coaches also won conference championships: Paterno captured three, and Franklin one, as a member of the Big 10. Paterno also captured national championships as head coach at Penn State in 1982 and 1986.

Paterno is the leader in seasons coached, with 46 years as head coach and games coached (548) and won (409). George W. Hoskins has the highest winning percentage at 0.759. Bradley has the lowest winning percentage of those who have coached more than one game, with 0.250. Of the 16 different head coaches who have led the Nittany Lions, Bill Hollenback, Dick Harlow, Bezdek, Higgins, Engle, and Paterno have been inducted into the College Football Hall of Fame.

== Key ==
Key to symbols in coaches list
General		Overall		Conference		Postseason (Note: Although the first Rose Bowl Game was played in 1902, it has been continuously played since the 1916 game, and is recognized as the oldest bowl game by the NCAA. "—" indicates any season prior to 1916 when postseason games were not played.)	
No.	Order of coaches (Note: A running total of the number of head coaches, with coaches who served separate tenures being counted only once. Interim head coaches are represented with "Int" and are not counted in the running total. "—" indicates the team played but either without a coach or no coach is on record. "X" indicates an interim year without play.)	GC	Games coached	CW	Conference wins	PW	Postseason wins
DC	Division championships	OW	Overall wins	CL	Conference losses	PL	Postseason losses
CC	Conference championships	OL	Overall losses	CT	Conference ties	PT	Postseason ties
NC	National championships	OT	Overall ties (Note: Overtime rules in college football were introduced in 1996, making ties impossible in the period since.)	C%	Conference winning percentage		
†	Elected to the College Football Hall of Fame	O%	Overall winning percentage (Note: When computing the win–loss percentage, a tie counts as half a win and half a loss.)				

== Coaches ==
List of head football coaches showing season(s) coached, overall records, conference records (Note: Penn State has been a member of Big Ten Conference since the 1993 season.), postseason records, championships and selected awards (Note: Statistics correct as of the end of the 2025 NCAA Division I FBS football season.)
No.	Name	Season(s)	GC	OW	OL	OT	O%	CW	CL	CT	C%	PW	PL	PT	DCs	CCs	NCs	Awards
0	No Coach	1887–1891	23	13	8	2	0.609	—	—	—	—	—	—	—	—	—	0	—
1	George W. Hoskins	1892–1895	29	20	5	4	0.759	—	—	—	—	—	—	—	—	—	0	—
2	Samuel B. Newton	1896–1898	26	12	14	0	0.462	—	—	—	—	—	—	—	—	—	0	—
3	Sam Boyle	1899	11	4	6	1	0.409	—	—	—	—	—	—	—	—	—	0	—
4	Pop Golden	1900–1902	29	16	12	1	0.569	—	—	—	—	—	—	—	—	—	0	—
5	Daniel A. Reed	1903	8	5	3	0	0.625	—	—	—	—	—	—	—	—	—	0	—
6	Tom Fennell	1904–1908	51	33	17	1	0.657	—	—	—	—	—	—	—	—	—	0	—
7	Bill Hollenback^{†}	1909; 1911–1914	41	28	9	4	0.732	—	—	—	—	—	—	—	—	—	0	—
8	Jack Hollenback	1910	8	5	2	1	0.688	—	—	—	—	—	—	—	—	—	0	—
9	Dick Harlow^{†}	1915–1917	28	20	8	0	0.714	—	—	—	—	—	—	—	—	—	0	—
10	Hugo Bezdek^{†}	1918–1929	106	65	30	11	0.665	—	—	—	—	0	1	0	—	—	0	—
11	Bob Higgins^{†}	1930–1948	159	91	57	11	0.607	—	—	—	—	0	0	1	—	—	0	—
12	Joe Bedenk	1949	9	5	4	0	0.556	—	—	—	—	0	0	0	—	—	0	—
13	Rip Engle^{†}	1950–1965	156	104	48	4	0.679	—	—	—	—	3	1	0	—	—	0	Amos Alonzo Stagg Award (1969)
14	Joe Paterno^{†}	1966–2011	548	409	136	3	0.749	95	54	0	0.638	24	12	1	0	3	2 – 1982; 1986	Sports Illustrated Man of the Year (1986); AFCA Coach of the Year (1968, 1978, 1982, 1986, 2005); Walter Camp Coach of the Year (1972, 1994, 2005); Eddie Robinson Coach of the Year (1978, 1982, 1986); Paul "Bear" Bryant Award (1986); George Munger Award (1990, 1994, 2005); Amos Alonso Stagg Award (2002); Home Depot Coach of the Year (2005); Sporting News Coach of the Year (2005); Big Ten Coach of the Year (1994, 2005, 2008)
Int	Tom Bradley (Note: Bradley served as interim head coach for the final four games in 2011 after Joe Paterno was fired.)	2011	4	1	3	—	0.250	1	2	—	0.333	0	1	—	0	0	0	—
15	Bill O'Brien	2012–2013	24	15	9	—	0.625	10	6	—	0.625	0	0	—	0	0	0	Paul "Bear" Bryant Award (2012); Maxwell Coach of the Year (2012); AT&T-ESPN Coach of the Year (2012); Big Ten Coach of the Year (2012 - Media & Coaches)
16	James Franklin	2014–2025	149	104	45	—	0.698	64	36	—	0.640	8	7	—	1	1	0	Woody Hayes Coach of the Year (2016); Dave McClain Coach of the Year (2016); Sporting News Coach of the Year (2016); Big Ten Coach of the Year (2016 - Media)
Int	Terry Smith	2025	6	3	3	—	0.500	3	3	—	0.000	0	0	—	0	0	0	—
17	Matt Campbell	2026–present																
