= List of Penn State Nittany Lions football seasons =

History of an American college sports program

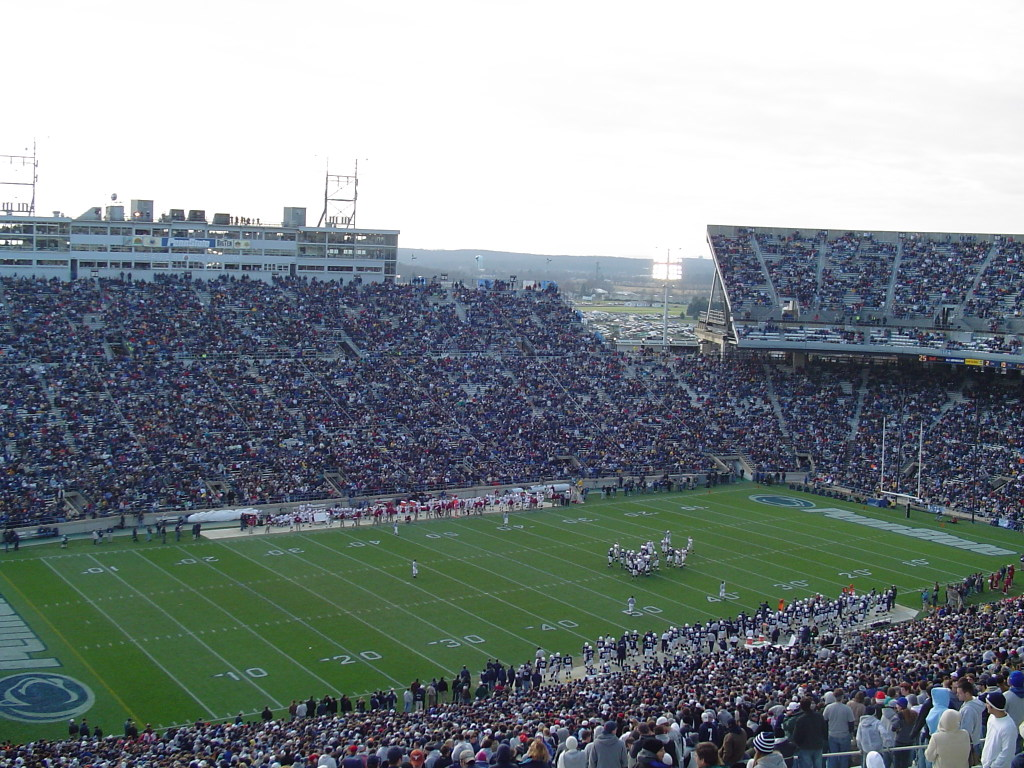
Beaver Stadium, the home stadium for Penn State football since 1960

This is a list of seasons completed by the Penn State Nittany Lions football team of the National Collegiate Athletic Association (NCAA) Division I Football Bowl Subdivision (FBS). Since the team's creation in 1887, the Nittany Lions have participated in 1,368 officially sanctioned games, including 52 bowl games. For most of its existence, Penn State competed as an independent. In 1993, Penn State joined the Big Ten Conference, where it has been a member ever since.

== Seasons ==
Year	Coach	Overall	Conference	Standing	Bowl/playoffs	Coaches^{#}	AP^{°}
Independent (1881–1890)
1881	No coach	1–0					
1882–86	No team						
1887	No coach	2–0					
1888	No coach	0–2–1					
1889	No coach	2–2					
1890	No coach	2–2					
PIFA (1891)
1891	No coach	6–2	4–1	1st			
George W. Hoskins (Independent) (1892–1895)
1892	George W. Hoskins	5–1					
1893	George W. Hoskins	4–1					
1894	George W. Hoskins	6–0–1					
1895	George W. Hoskins	2–2–3					
Samuel B. Newton (Independent) (1896–1898)
1896	Samuel B. Newton	3–4					
1897	Samuel B. Newton	3–6					
1898	Samuel B. Newton	6–4					
Sam Boyle (Independent) (1899)
1899	Sam Boyle	4–6–1					
Pop Golden (Independent) (1900–1902)
1900	Pop Golden	4–6–1					
1901	Pop Golden	5–3					
1902	Pop Golden	7–3					
Daniel A. Reed (Independent) (1903)
1903	Daniel A. Reed	5–3					
Tom Fennell (Independent) (1904–1908)
1904	Tom Fennell	6–4					
1905	Tom Fennell	8–3					
1906	Tom Fennell	8–1–1					
1907	Tom Fennell	6–4					
1908	Tom Fennell	5–5					
Bill Hollenback (Independent) (1909)
1909	Bill Hollenback	5–0–2					
Jack Hollenback (Independent) (1910)
1910	Jack Hollenback	5–2–1					
Bill Hollenback (Independent) (1911–1914)
1911	Bill Hollenback	8–0–1					
1912	Bill Hollenback	8–0					
1913	Bill Hollenback	2–6					
1914	Bill Hollenback	5–3–1					
Dick Harlow (Independent) (1915–1917)
1915	Dick Harlow	7–2					
1916	Dick Harlow	8–2					
1917	Dick Harlow	5–4					
Hugo Bezdek (Independent) (1918–1929)
1918	Hugo Bezdek	1–2–1					
1919	Hugo Bezdek	7–1					
1920	Hugo Bezdek	7–0–2					
1921	Hugo Bezdek	8–0–2					
1922	Hugo Bezdek	6–4–1			L Rose		
1923	Hugo Bezdek	6–2–1					
1924	Hugo Bezdek	6–3–1					
1925	Hugo Bezdek	4–4–1					
1926	Hugo Bezdek	5–4					
1927	Hugo Bezdek	6–2–1					
1928	Hugo Bezdek	3–5–1					
1929	Hugo Bezdek	6–3					
Bob Higgins (Independent) (1930–1948)
1930	Bob Higgins	3–4–2					
1931	Bob Higgins	2–8					
1932	Bob Higgins	2–5					
1933	Bob Higgins	3–3–1					
1934	Bob Higgins	4–4					
1935	Bob Higgins	4–4					
1936	Bob Higgins	3–5					
1937	Bob Higgins	5–3					
1938	Bob Higgins	3–4–1					
1939	Bob Higgins	5–1–2					
1940	Bob Higgins	6–1–1					
1941	Bob Higgins	7–2					
1942	Bob Higgins	6–1–1					19
1943	Bob Higgins	5–3–1					
1944	Bob Higgins	6–3					
1945	Bob Higgins	5–3					
1946	Bob Higgins	6–2					
1947	Bob Higgins	9–0–1			T Cotton		4
1948	Bob Higgins	7–1–1					18
Joe Bedenk (Independent) (1949)
1949	Joe Bedenk	5–4					
Rip Engle (Independent) (1950–1965)
1950	Rip Engle	5–3–1					
1951	Rip Engle	5–4					
1952	Rip Engle	7–2–1					
1953	Rip Engle	6–3					
1954	Rip Engle	7–2				16	20
1955	Rip Engle	5–4					
1956	Rip Engle	6–2–1					
1957	Rip Engle	6–3					
1958	Rip Engle	6–3–1					
1959	Rip Engle	9–2			W Liberty	10	12
1960	Rip Engle	7–3			W Liberty		16
1961	Rip Engle	8–3			W Gator	19	17
1962	Rip Engle	9–2			L Gator	9	9
1963	Rip Engle	7–3				16	
1964	Rip Engle	6–4				14	
1965	Rip Engle	5–5					
Joe Paterno (Independent) (1966–1992)
1966	Joe Paterno	5–5					
1967	Joe Paterno	8–2–1			T Gator	11	10
1968	Joe Paterno	11–0			W Orange	3	2
1969	Joe Paterno	11–0			W Orange	2	2
1970	Joe Paterno	7–3				19	18
1971	Joe Paterno	11–1			W Cotton	11	5
1972	Joe Paterno	10–2			L Sugar	8	10
1973	Joe Paterno	12–0			W Orange	5	5
1974	Joe Paterno	10–2			W Cotton	7	7
1975	Joe Paterno	9–3			L Sugar	10	10
1976	Joe Paterno	7–5			L Gator		
1977	Joe Paterno	11–1			W Fiesta	4	5
1978	Joe Paterno	11–1			L Sugar	4	4
1979	Joe Paterno	8–4			W Liberty	18	20
1980	Joe Paterno	10–2			W Fiesta	8	8
1981	Joe Paterno	10–2			W Fiesta	3	3
1982	Joe Paterno	11–1			W Sugar	1	1
1983	Joe Paterno	8–4–1			W Aloha	17	
1984	Joe Paterno	6–5					
1985	Joe Paterno	11–1			L Orange	3	3
1986	Joe Paterno	12–0			W Fiesta	1	1
1987	Joe Paterno	8–4			L Florida Citrus		
1988	Joe Paterno	5–6					
1989	Joe Paterno	8–3–1			W Holiday	14	15
1990	Joe Paterno	9–3			L Blockbuster	10	11
1991	Joe Paterno	11–2			W Fiesta	3	3
1992	Joe Paterno	7–5			L Blockbuster^{†}	24	
Joe Paterno (Big Ten Conference) (1993–2011)
1993	Joe Paterno	10–2	6–2	3rd	W Florida Citrus	7	8
1994	Joe Paterno	12–0	8–0	1st	W Rose	2	2
1995	Joe Paterno	9–3	5–3	T–3rd	W Outback	12	13
1996	Joe Paterno	11–2	6–2	T–3rd	W Fiesta^{†}	7	7
1997	Joe Paterno	9–3	6–2	T–2nd	L Florida Citrus	17	16
1998	Joe Paterno	9–3	5–3	5th	W Outback	15	17
1999	Joe Paterno	10–3	5–3	T–4th	W Alamo	11	11
2000	Joe Paterno	5–7	4–4	T–6th			
2001	Joe Paterno	5–6	4–4	T–4th			
2002	Joe Paterno	9–4	5–3	4th	L Capital One	15	16
2003	Joe Paterno	3–9	1–7	T–8th			
2004	Joe Paterno	4–7	2–6	9th			
2005	Joe Paterno	11–1	7–1	T–1st	W Orange^{†}	3	3
2006	Joe Paterno	9–4	5–3	T–4th	W Outback	25	24
2007	Joe Paterno	9–4	4–4	T–5th	W Alamo	25	
2008	Joe Paterno	11–2	7–1	T–1st	L Rose^{†}	8	8
2009	Joe Paterno	11–2	6–2	T–2nd	W Capital One	8	9
2010	Joe Paterno	7–6	4–4	T–4th	L Outback		
2011	Joe Paterno (Note: Paterno coached the first nine games of the season before he was fired on November 9. Tom Bradley was named interim head coach to replace him. Penn State credits the first nine games to Paterno, and the final four to Bradley.)	9–4	6–2	T–1st (Leaders)	L Ticket City		
Bill O'Brien (Big Ten Conference) (2012–2013)
2012	Bill O'Brien	8–4	6–2	2nd (Leaders)	Ineligible (Note: Ineligible for Big Ten title, bowl game and Coaches Poll.)		
2013	Bill O'Brien	7–5	4–4	3rd (Leaders)	Ineligible		
James Franklin (Big Ten Conference) (2014–2025)
2014	James Franklin	7–6	2–6	6th (East)	W Pinstripe		
2015	James Franklin	7–6	4–4	4th (East)	L TaxSlayer		
2016	James Franklin	11–3	8–1	T–1st (East)	L Rose^{†}	7	7
2017	James Franklin	11–2	7–2	T–2nd (East)	W Fiesta^{†}	8	8
2018	James Franklin	9–4	6–3	3rd (East)	L Citrus	17	17
2019	James Franklin	11–2	7–2	2nd (East)	W Cotton^{†}	9	9
2020	James Franklin	4–5	4–5	3rd (East)			
2021	James Franklin	7–6	4–5	4th (East)	L Outback		
2022	James Franklin	11–2	7–2	3rd (East)	W Rose^{†}	7	7
2023	James Franklin	10–3	7–2	3rd (East)	L Peach^{†}	13	13
2024	James Franklin	13–3	8–1	T–2nd	W CFP First Round^{†} W Fiesta^{†} (CFP Quarterfinal); L Orange^{†} (CFP Semifinal)	5	5
2025	James Franklin	7–6	3–6	T–12th	W Pinstripe		
Total:		950–418–42					
National championship Conference title Conference division title or championship game berth
^{†}Indicates Bowl Coalition, Bowl Alliance, BCS, or CFP / New Years' Six bowl.; ^{#}Rankings from final Coaches Poll.
