= Thomas Fennell =

Thomas Fennell may refer to:

- Thomas Fennell (politician) (1928–2012), member of the Parliament of Canada
- Thomas McCarthy Fennell (1841–1914), Irish prisoner
- Tom Fennell (1875–1936), American football coach
- Thomas F. Fennell (1904–1991), American college football player

== See also ==
- Fennell, surname
