= Fennell =

Fennell is a surname. Notable people with the surname include:

- Alan Fennell (1936–2001), British writer and editor
- Albert Fennell (1920–1988), British film and television producer
- Dale Fennell (born 1957), English rugby player, son of Jack
- Dave Fennell (born 1953), Canadian football player
- Desmond Fennell (1929–2021), Irish writer, philosopher, and linguist
- Eamonn Fennell (born 1984), Gaelic football player
- Emerald Fennell (born 1985), English actress, filmmaker, and writer
- Frederick Fennell (1914–2004), American music conductor
- Hernán Fennell (born 1988), Argentine cricketer
- Jack Fennell (1933–2019), English rugby player, father of Dale
- Jan Fennell, dog trainer and writer
- Jane Fennell, Australian TV presenter
- John Fennell (born 1995), Canadian luger
- John Lister Illingworth Fennell (1918–1992), British historian of Russia
- Joseph Fennell (1835–1919), Anglican priest
- Kahil Fennell (born 1982), American college basketball coach
- Kevin Fennell (born 1959), American drummer, Guided by Voices
- L. Raymond Fennell (1893–1986), Canadian politician
- Marc Fennell (born 1985), Australian film critic, technology journalist, radio personality and author
- Melanie Fennell, British psychologist
- Nuala Fennell (1935–2009), Irish economist and politician
- Patricia Fennell, American writer and businessperson
- Robert Fennell (born 1956), American politician and restaurateur
- Susan Fennell (born 1953), Canadian politician, mayor of Brampton, Ontario
- Thomas Fennell (disambiguation)
- Willie Fennell (1920–1992), Australian actor and comedian

== See also ==
- Finnell, a surname
- Fennel, a plant
