= 1908 Franklin & Marshall Nevonians football team =

American college football season

1908 Franklin & Marshall Nevonians football
- Conference: Independent
- Record: 4–6–1
- Head coach: Jack Hollenback (1st season)
- Captain: Emory Dietrich

1908 Eastern college football independents records
	Conf.			Overall
Team	W	L	T	W		L		T
Penn		–		11	–	0	–	1
Harvard		–		9	–	0	–	1
Cornell		–		7	–	1	–	1
Fordham		–		5	–	1	–	0
Yale		–		7	–	1	–	1
Dartmouth		–		6	–	1	–	1
Carlisle		–		10	–	2	–	1
Washington & Jefferson		–		10	–	2	–	1
Army		–		6	–	1	–	2
Pittsburgh		–		8	–	3	–	0
Lafayette		–		6	–	2	–	2
Princeton		–		5	–	2	–	3
Syracuse		–		6	–	3	–	1
Brown		–		5	–	3	–	1
Temple		–		3	–	2	–	1
Colgate		–		4	–	3	–	0
Lehigh		–		4	–	3	–	0
Dickinson		–		5	–	4	–	0
Amherst		–		3	–	3	–	2
Holy Cross		–		4	–	4	–	0
Penn State		–		5	–	5	–	0
Vermont		–		3	–	3	–	3
Wesleyan		–		3	–	4	–	2
Springfield Training School		–		3	–	4	–	1
NYU		–		2	–	3	–	2
Franklin & Marshall		–		4	–	6	–	1
Bucknell		–		3	–	5	–	2
Rutgers		–		3	–	5	–	1
Boston College		–		2	–	4	–	2
Carnegie Tech		–		3	–	7	–	0
Geneva		–		1	–	6	–	2
Tufts		–		1	–	6	–	1
Villanova		–		1	–	6	–	0
New Hampshire		–		1	–	7	–	0
Drexel		–		0	–	7	–	0

The 1908 Franklin & Marshall Nevonians football team was an American football team that represented Franklin & Marshall College during the 1908 college football season. The team compiled a 4–6–1 record. Jack Hollenback, a former Penn player, was the team's head coach.

== Schedule ==
Date	Opponent	Site	Result	Source
September 26	Elverson Athletic Club	Lancaster, PA	W 23–0	
October 3	Dickinson	Lancaster, PA (rivalry)	L 0–16	
October 10	at Lebanon Valley	Annville, PA	W 5–4	
October 17	at Haverford	Haverford, PA	L 0–6	
October 24	at St. John's (MD)	Annapolis, MD	L 5–12	
October 31	Jefferson Medical	Lancaster, PA	W 10–0	
November 3	at Rutgers	Neilson Field; New Brunswick, NJ	L 0–9	
November 7	at Muhlenberg	Muhlenberg Field; Allentown, PA	W 5–0	
November 14	Susquehanna	Lancaster, PA	T 0–0	
November 21	at Delaware	Newark, DE	L 0–15	
November 26	Gettysburg	Lancaster, PA (rivalry)	L 5–10	
