= Finnell =

Finnell is a surname. Notable people with the surname include:

- Howard Finnell (1894–1960), American agronomist and erosion specialist
- Kieryn Finnell (born 2008), American artistic gymnast
- Michael Finnell (born 1955), American film producer
- Woolsey Finnell, namesake of the Woolsey Finnell Bridge in Alabama and state director of highways

== See also ==
- Fennell
