= Jan Fennell =

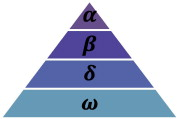
Grey wolf purported social hierarchy

Jan Fennell, "The dog listener", is an English dog trainer who applied the insights of Monty Roberts into horse behavior to the behavior of dogs.

Other dog experts have cited recent scientific research to challenge the theory that dog behavior is based on the model of the wolf pack, criticizing this as an over-simplification.

Due to this, many of Fennell's beliefs are considered dated and archaic, no longer being scientifically accurate.

Fennell's method, called Amichien Bonding (from the French 'ami', meaning 'friend' and 'chien', meaning 'dog'), emphasizes learning the signals (in her opinion) by which dogs recognize leadership, and using them consistently so that the dog perceives the owner as 'alpha' and itself as subordinate. It can then possibly trust its owner to take decisions and will become contented and relaxed. Fennell does not believe in physically dominating or chastising the dog.

Amichien Bonding essentially means the dog is consistently shown by the owner that the human half of the partnership is responsible for making decisions. The dog is not physically dominated, but is trained through, among other behaviors, ignoring the animal at certain times: this is done to reassure it that it is not the one responsible for leadership and decision-making. There is dispute over whether this type of training program can have negative effects and it has been called "psychologically cruel" by one author. Other dog trainers/owners believe it is a harmless and effective way of indicating to the dog which behaviors are acceptable and which are not.

== Books ==
- Fennell, Jan (March 2003). The Dog Listener. ISIS. ISBN 978-0-7531-5630-8.
- Fennell, Jan (2006). Practical Dog Listener. HarperCollins Entertainment. ISBN 978-0-00-714570-6.
- A Dog's Best Friend
- Friends For Life
- Fennell, Jan (2005). The Seven Ages of Your Dog. HarperCollinsEntertainment. ISBN 978-0-00-719920-4.
- The Puppy Listener

In addition to her books and DVD, Fennell had her own TV show explaining the understanding of dogs and demonstrating successful interventions, broadcast on Animal Planet on Friday nights.
