= Penn State Nittany Lions football =

American football team

2026 Penn State Nittany Lions football team
- First season: 1887; 139 years ago
- Athletic director: Pat Kraft
- General manager: Derek Hoodjer
- Head coach: Matt Campbell; 1st season, 6–4 (.600)
- Location: University Park, Pennsylvania
- Stadium: Beaver Stadium (capacity: 106,304)
- Field: West Shore Home Field
- NCAA division: Division I FBS
- Conference: Big Ten
- Colors: Blue and white
- All-time record: 954–419–42 (.689)
- CFP record: 2–1 (.667)
- Bowl record: 34–21–2 (.614)

National championships
- Claimed: 1982, 1986
- Unclaimed: 1911, 1912, 1969, 1981, 1994

National finalist
- Poll era: 1978, 1982, 1985, 1986

College Football Playoff appearances
- 2024

Conference championships
- PIFA: 1891 Big Ten: 1994, 2005, 2008, 2016

Division championships
- Big Ten Leaders: 2011 Big Ten East: 2016
- Heisman winners: John Cappelletti – 1973
- Consensus All-Americans: 44
- Rivalries: Ohio State (rivalry); Michigan State (rivalry); Michigan (rivalry); Minnesota (trophy); Maryland (rivalry); Syracuse (rivalry); Pittsburgh (rivalry); West Virginia (rivalry); Alabama (rivalry)

Uniforms
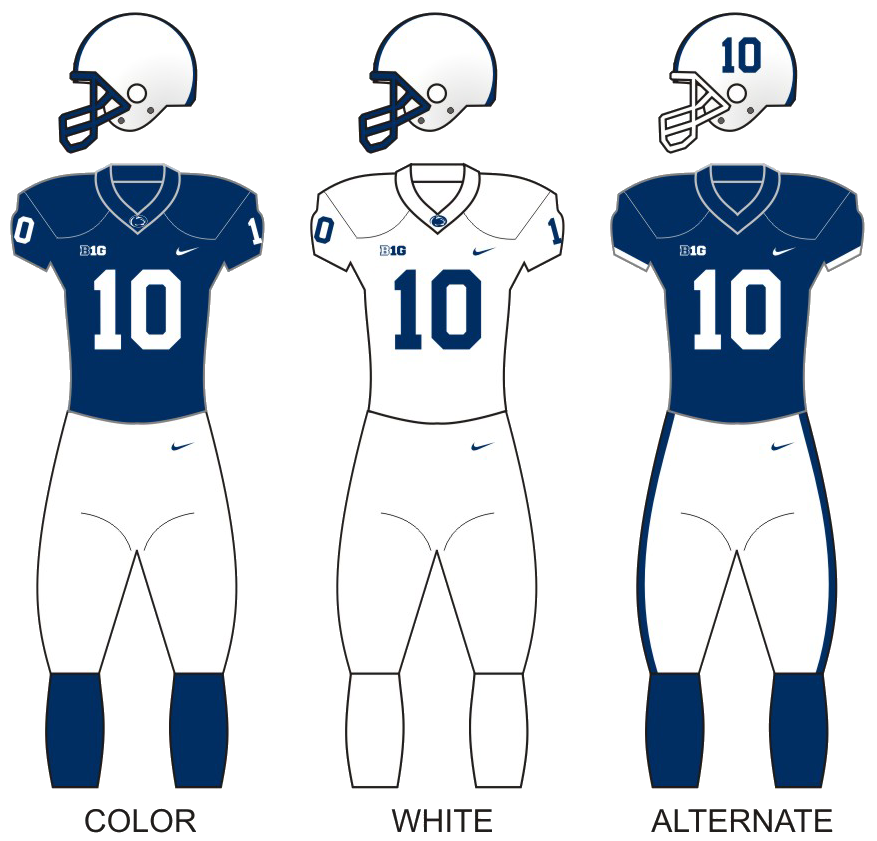
- Fight song: Fight On, State
- Mascot: Nittany Lion
- Marching band: Penn State Blue Band
- Outfitter: Adidas
- Website: gopsusports.com

The Penn State Nittany Lions team represents the Pennsylvania State University in college football. The Nittany Lions compete in the NCAA Division I Football Bowl Subdivision (FBS) as a member of the Big Ten Conference, which they joined in 1993 after playing as an Independent from 1892 to 1992.

Established in 1887, the Nittany Lions have achieved numerous on-field successes, including two consensus national championships in 1982 and 1986; four Big Ten Conference championships in 1994, 2005, 2008 and 2016; 13 undefeated seasons in 1887, 1894, 1909, 1911, 1912, 1920, 1921, 1947, 1968, 1969, 1973, 1986 and 1994; and 53 appearances in college bowl games, with an all-time post-season bowl record of 34-21-2. The team ranks seventh among NCAA Division I college football programs in all-time total wins.

The Nittany Lions play their home games at Beaver Stadium, located on campus in University Park, Pennsylvania.

== History ==
=== Early history (1887–1949) ===
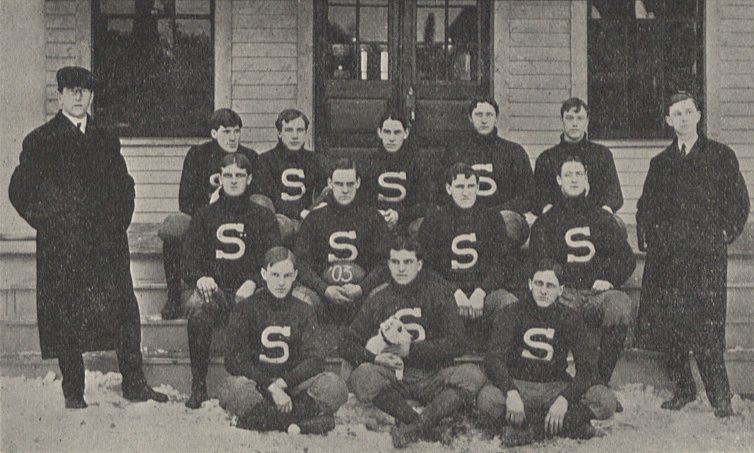
The 1903 Penn State football team

The first recorded game in Penn State football history occurred on November 12, 1881, when Penn State traveled to Lewisburg, Pennsylvania, to play Bucknell, known until 1886 as the University at Lewisburg. Penn State won 9–0, which was nine goals to none. At the time, this was really a game of "American rugby". The father of American football, Walter Camp, did not develop the "scrimmage", the "first down" and the "gridiron" (yard markings) until 1882. Although this game was reported in two State College newspapers and the Mirror (University at Lewisburg campus newspaper), Bucknell denies that this game ever happened. Penn State did not field teams from 1882 through 1886. Penn State played its first season in 1887, but had no head coach for their first five years, from 1887 to 1891. The teams played its home games on the Old Main lawn on campus in State College, Pennsylvania. They compiled a 12–8–1 record in these seasons, playing as an independent from 1887 to 1890.

In 1891, the Pennsylvania Intercollegiate Football Association (PIFA) was formed. It consisted of Bucknell University (then known as the University at Lewisburg), Dickinson College, Franklin & Marshall, Haverford College, Penn State and Swarthmore College. Lafayette and Lehigh were excluded because it was felt they would dominate the Association. Penn State won the championship with a 4–1–0 record. Bucknell's record was 3–1–1, losing to Franklin & Marshall and tying Dickinson. The Association was dissolved prior to the 1892 season.

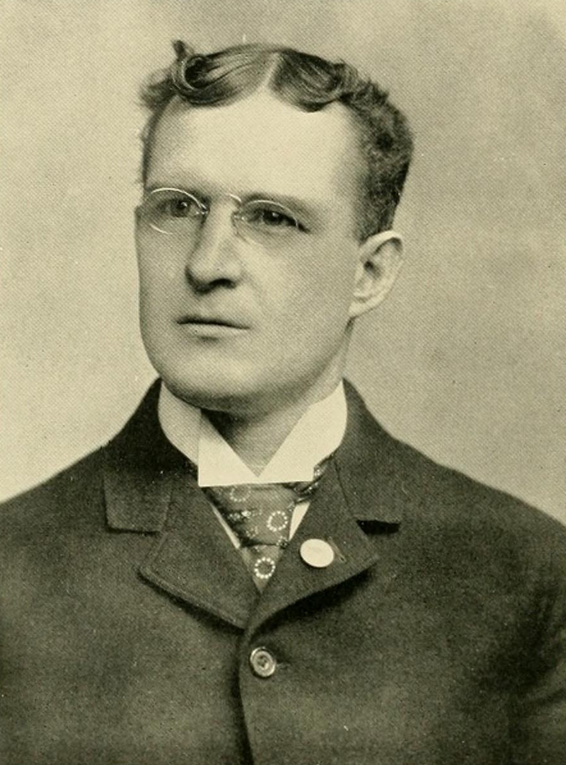
George W. Hoskins, Penn State's first head football coach, posted a 17-4-4 record between 1892 and 1895, the highest winning percentage in the program's history.

George W. Hoskins was the first head football coach at Penn State. He posted a 17–4–4 record in his from 1892 to 1895 as head coach, and his .760 winning percentage ranks highest in program history. His first team played its home game on the Old Main lawn on campus in State College, Pennsylvania, before the 500-seat Beaver Field opened in 1893. He was succeeded by Samuel B. Newton, who posted a 12–14 (.462) record in three seasons, 1896–1898. Sam Boyle coached for only one year in 1899 and compiled a 4–6–1 record (.409). Pop Golden coached the Nittany Lions for three seasons from 1900 to 1902, tallying a record of 16–12–1 (.569). Daniel A. Reed took over for the 1903 season and went 5–3 (.625). Tom Fennell coached the Nittany Lions for five seasons from 1904 to 1908, posting a 33–17–1 (.657) record.

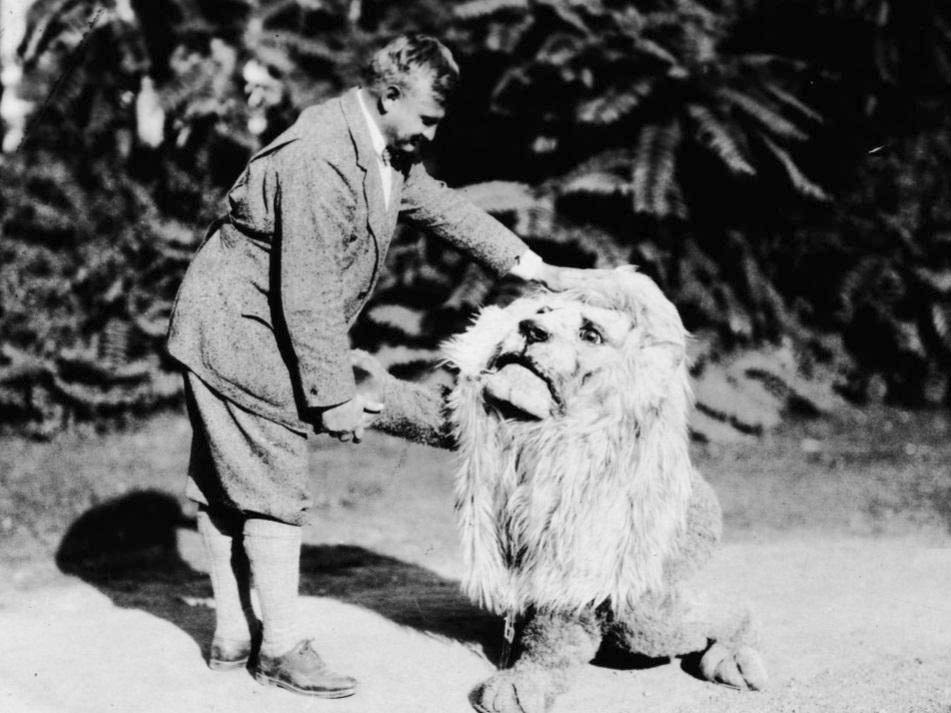
Coach Hugo Bezdek, who posted a 65–30–11 career record as head coach over 12 seasons between 1918 and 1929, along with the Nittany Lion mascot in the 1920s

In 1907, the school adopted the Nittany Lion mascot, a mountain lion named after nearby Mount Nittany. An early mascot was "Old Coaly", a mule that hauled stone for the original Old Main (completed in 1863 and demolished in 1929). Bill Hollenback took over the Nittany Lions as head coach for the 1909 season and went undefeated at 5–0–2, but left for Missouri for 1910. Bill's older brother Jack Hollenback took over for the 1910 season and went 5–2–1 (.688), but Bill returned to Penn State from 1911 to 1914. Bill went 23–9–2 in his second tenure for a combined record of 28–9–4 (.732). In 1911 and 1912, his teams went 8–0–1 and 8–0, and were awarded retroactive national championships by the National Championship Foundation which are recognized by the NCAA. Head coach Dick Harlow brought a new form of defense, trying to go in-between or around offensive blockers rather than try to overpower them. Harlow's Nittany Lions compiled a 20–8 (.714) record in his three seasons (1915–1917) and was later inducted into the College Football Hall of Fame as a coach for his accomplishments.

Hugo Bezdek was Penn State's head football coach for 12 seasons, and was the Nittany Lions' first athletics director. Bezdek posted a 65–30–11 record, which included two undefeated seasons and a berth in the 1922 Rose Bowl, a game they lost. Bezdek's Nittany Lions posted a losing record in only two of Bezdek's seasons, going 1–2–1 in 1918 and 3–5–1 in 1928. Bezdek retired after the 1929 season and was inducted into the College Football Hall of Fame as a coach in 1954. Bob Higgins returned to his alma mater and served as Penn State's head football coach for 19 seasons. He compiled a 91–57–11 overall record, which included 11 winning seasons and only five losing seasons. Higgins' 1947 team tied SMU in the Cotton Bowl. Higgins was forced to retire due to poor health following the 1948 season. He was inducted into the College Football Hall of Fame as a coach in 1954. For one season, Joe Bedenk, also a Penn State alum, served as the Nittany Lions' head football coach. He was promoted from offensive line coach after the retirement of his predecessor. Bedenk posted a 5–4 record in his 1949, his lone season as head coach, before requesting to return to his previous post as offensive line coach.

=== Rip Engle era (1950–1965) ===
Rip Engle came to Penn State from Brown. Engle posted a 104–48–4 record during his 16-season tenure as head coach and developed a game known as Angleball as a way for his players to maintain fitness in the off-season. Engle never had a losing season at Penn State, and his 5–5 final season was his only non-winning season. His 1959 and 1960 Nittany Lions teams won the Liberty Bowl, while his 1961 and 1962 teams reached the Gator Bowl, winning the first and losing the second. Engle retired following the 1965 season and was inducted into the College Football Hall of Fame as a coach in 1973.

=== Joe Paterno era (1966–2011) ===
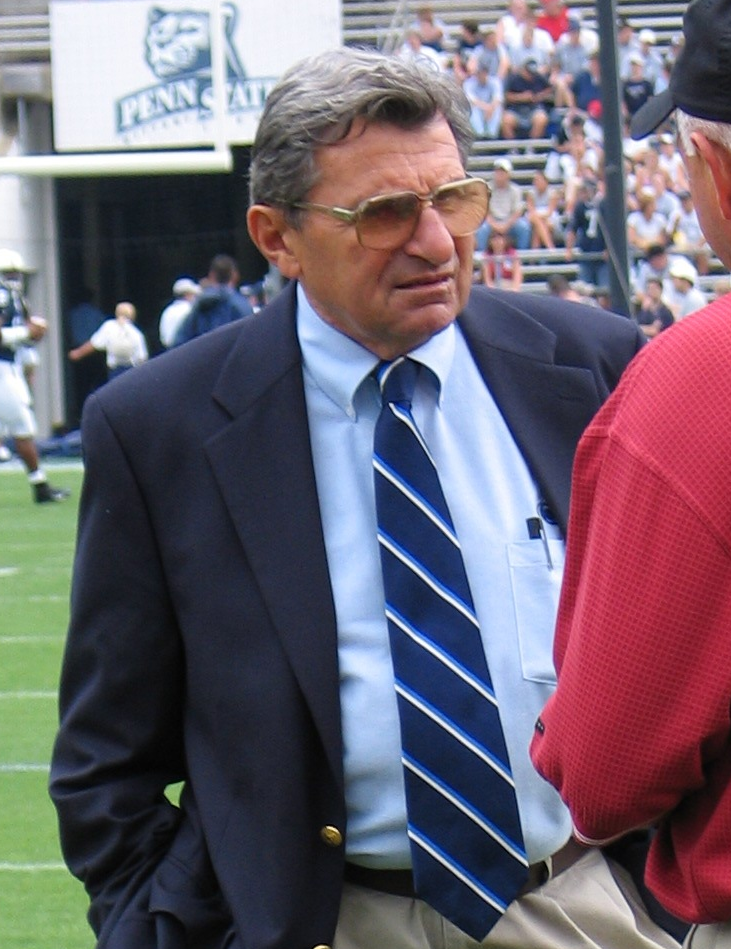
Joe Paterno, head coach from 1966 to 2011

Penn State assistant Joe Paterno was promoted to head coach following the retirement of Engle. Paterno spent 46 seasons as the head football coach, the longest tenure of any head coach in the FBS, and 16 more seasons as an assistant, making his 62 total years coaching at Penn State the most of any coach at any school. Under Paterno, Penn State played as an Independent from 1966 to 1992, and he continued to coach them when they joined the Big Ten Conference in 1993–2011. He also served as Penn State's athletic director from 1980 to 1982. His final record is 409–136–3. His teams won national championships in 1982 and 1986, posted non-losing records in all seasons but five, and appeared in 37 bowl games with 24 wins. His teams also won the Orange Bowl in 1968, 1969, 1973 and 2005; the Fiesta Bowl in 1977, 1980, 1981, 1986, 1991 and 1996; the Sugar Bowl in 1982; and the Rose Bowl in 1994. In June 1990, Penn State's athletics program, after a century as a Division I-A independent, joined the Big Ten Conference. Beaver Stadium was expanded six times during Paterno's tenure. He was elected to the College Football Hall of Fame in 2006 and was a major reason why the longtime rule of waiting until retirement to be inducted into the Hall of Fame was changed to any coach over 75 years of age. Players including Kerry Collins, Charlie Zapiec, Matt Millen, Shane Conlan, Jack Ham, Dennis Onkotz, Franco Harris, Greg Buttle, Keith Dorney, John Cappelletti, Curt Warner, Larry Johnson, LaVar Arrington and Ted Kwalick played collegiately for him. He won numerous coaching and sportsman honors during his long run at Penn State.

Paterno has the most wins in FBS football (409).

Following the Pennsylvania Attorney General's release of a grand jury summary of child sexual abuse charges involving former assistant Jerry Sandusky, the Penn State board of trustees fired Paterno in November 2011. Defensive coordinator Tom Bradley finished out the 2011 season as interim head coach after Paterno's ouster. In July 2012, the NCAA decided to vacate all of the team's wins from 1998 to 2011. Paterno's statue outside Beaver Stadium was also taken down. The revised record dropped Paterno from first to twelfth on the all-time wins list, but on January 16, 2015, the NCAA restored Paterno's vacated wins, and thus his record as the winningest FBS football coach. To many he is "The best Penn State head coach ever."

=== Bill O'Brien tenure (2012–2013) ===
New England Patriots offensive coordinator Bill O'Brien was hired as the 15th head football coach at Penn State, taking over the Nittany Lions football program in January 2012. Early in O'Brien's tenure, the NCAA sanctioned Penn State with a four-season postseason ban and a loss of 40 scholarships due to the child sex abuse scandal. O'Brien posted an 8–4 record in his first season as head coach of the Nittany Lions.

O'Brien's 2013 Nittany Lions team posted a 7–5 record in the second of four years they were ineligible for the postseason. In January 2014, Bill O'Brien left Penn State to accept the head coaching position with the NFL's Houston Texans.

=== James Franklin era (2014–2025) ===
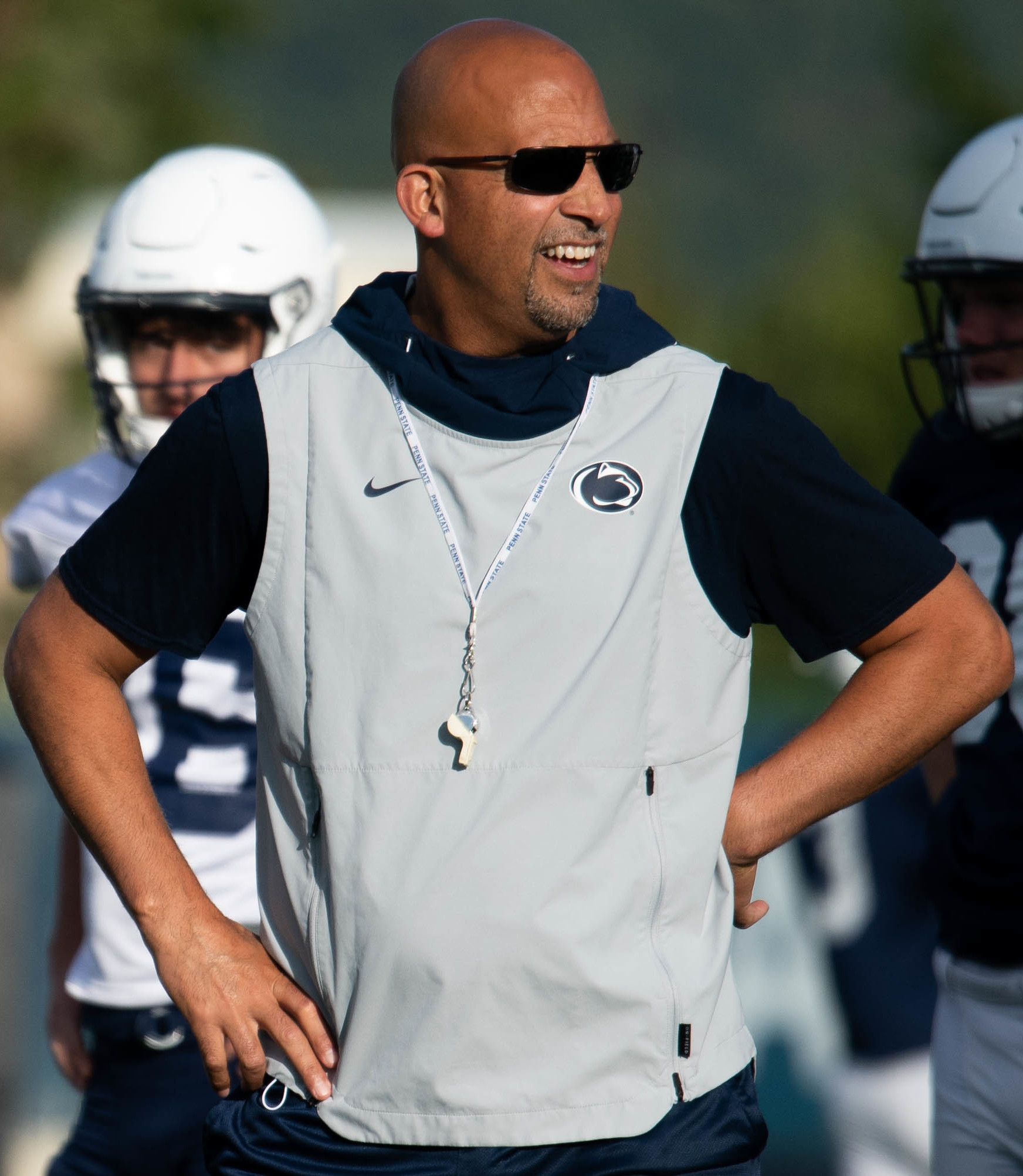
James Franklin, head coach from 2014 to 2025

On January 11, 2014, Vanderbilt head coach James Franklin was hired as the 16th Penn State head football coach. He is the first African American head football coach at Penn State. In Franklin's first year, the NCAA lifted Penn State's postseason ban and the Nittany Lions were bowl eligible. The Nittany Lions were named to the Pinstripe Bowl where they won against Boston College on December 27, 2014, at Yankee Stadium.

To start off the 2015 season, Penn State lost to Temple 27–10, its first loss to the Owls since 1941. The loss was followed by victories against Buffalo, Rutgers, San Diego State, Army and Indiana. The Nittany Lions then lost to Ohio State 38–10 in Columbus before winning, 31–30, at Maryland. The victory against Maryland brought the Nittany Lions to six wins, making them bowl eligible for the second year since the postseason ban was lifted. Penn State then shut out the Illinois 39–0 in the second to last home game of the 2015 season. They then lost to Michigan in Happy Valley 28–16 and to Michigan State 55–16 at MSU. The win–loss record for Penn State in the 2015 regular season was 7–5, and 7–6 after a loss to Georgia in the Taxslayer Bowl in Jacksonville.

The 2016 season featured an upset over No. 2 Ohio State during a "White-Out" in State College. Following the win, Penn State was ranked 24th in the AP Poll, its first ranking since 2011. Penn State finished the regular season 10–2, 8–1 in Big Ten play. After winning a tiebreaker against rivals Ohio State, Penn State went on to claim the Big Ten East title and a spot in the Big Ten Championship game in Indianapolis against Big Ten West champion Wisconsin, which they won after trailing 28–14 in the first half. They outscored the Badgers 24–3 in the second half to take home the Nittany Lions' fourth Big Ten Title. On August 18, 2017, Penn State announced that Franklin signed a six-year contract extension worth $5.738 million a year. That deal includes retention bonuses paid at the end of each year of the contract. "My family and I are very thankful to be a part of the Penn State community," Franklin said in a statement. "I am pleased with the progress our program has made in the community, in the classroom and on the field. I look forward to diligently working with President Barron and Director of Athletics Sandy Barbour on implementing a plan that puts our University and our student-athletes in the best position to compete on the field and in life." In addition to the guaranteed money, Franklin's contract extension has incentives including $800,000 for a national title, $400,000 for a College Football Playoff appearance and $350,000 for winning the Big Ten Championship Game. His incentives are capped at $1 million per year.

Penn State went to 7–0 to begin the 2017 season, before losing on consecutive weekends to Ohio State and Michigan State. Penn State finished the regular season with wins over Rutgers, Nebraska and Maryland. Penn State capped the 2017 season at the Fiesta Bowl, beating Washington, 35–28.

In 2018 the Lions went 9–4 with a loss to Kentucky in the Citrus Bowl. The 2019 season was spectacular for Penn State going 11–2 with the losses only to Minnesota by 26–31 and to Ohio State and beat American Athletic Conference Champion Memphis who at that time was 12–1. Penn State beat Memphis 53–39 in the Cotton Bowl.

The 2020 season was James Franklin's first losing season with the Nittany Lions. They started off the season with COVID-19 pandemic spring cancelations. Penn State traveled to Bloomington to take on Indiana where they lost in overtime 35–36 with Michael Penix Jr.'s pendulum touch two-point conversion winning the Game for Indiana. The Nittany Lions took on Ohio State at home with no whiteout due to the COVID-19 pandemic. Penn State lost 25–38. The Nittany Lions took on Maryland who they had not lost to since 2014. The Terrapins beat Penn State 19–35 in Beaver Stadium. The Nittany Lions traveled to Nebraska to take on the Nebraska Cornhuskers where the Nittany Lions comeback fell short and lost 23–30. The Nittany Lions fought the Iowa Hawkeyes but lost 21–41 giving Penn State its first ever 0–5 start in its history. The Nittany Lions, determined to win, traveled to Ann Arbor to defeat the Michigan Wolverines. Penn State got its first victory of the season 27–17 going 1–5. Penn State took on the Rutgers Scarlet Knights in Piscataway where they won again 23–7 thus giving them a 2–5 record. Penn State went home to take on the Michigan State. They trailed 10–21 at halftime but rallied back to win 39–24 getting a 3–5 record. For the Big Ten Championship week Penn State hosted the Fighting Illini at home. Penn State won in rout 56–21 going to a 4–5 record. Penn State players voted to not accept a bowl invitation so their final record was 4–5. A major offseason change was replacing first-year offensive coordinator Kirk Ciarrocca with Texas offensive coordinator Mike Yurcich. James Franklin also signed a ten-year $75,000,000 contract extension.

In 2021, Penn State improved upon its lackluster 2020 season going 7–6. The Nittany Lions finished the season unranked and with a 4–5 Big Ten Conference record. They went 2–3 on the road while maintaining a winning 5–2 record at Beaver Stadium. The season started strong on September 4, 2021, when Penn State defeated the #12 ranked Wisconsin Badgers football team. They won their next 4 games including a 28–20 win over the #22 Auburn Tigers football team. Then they began to struggle after a close 23–20 loss to the #3 Iowa Hawkeyes on the road October 9, 2021. On October 23, 2021, Penn State battled the Illinois Fighting Illini through an NCAA record 9 overtimes, eventually losing 20–18. The Nittany Lions' only subsequent wins came against Maryland (31–14) and Rutgers (28–0). They closed out the 2021 season playing Arkansas at the Outback Bowl, losing the game 24–10. Penn State had a strong 2022 campaign, going 11-2 and defeating Pac-12 champion Utah in the 2023 Rose Bowl.

In 2024, Penn State went 11–1 in the regular season and secured a spot in the Big 10 Championship, their first appearance since 2016. Penn state lost to Oregon but still received an at-large bid in the inaugural year of the 12-team College Football Playoff as the sixth seed. The team won a first-round game against SMU at home and a quarterfinal game against Boise State in the Fiesta Bowl. In the semifinal Orange Bowl against Notre Dame, Penn State lost after throwing an interception in the final minute to allow Notre Dame to score.

In 2025, Penn State started the season 3–0, but then slumped, dropping their first three conference games. This included back-to-back losses as 20-point favorites against then winless UCLA and Northwestern squads, considered some of the worst in Penn State history. As a result, James Franklin was fired, finishing his tenure at Penn State with a 104–45 record. Penn State ultimately finished the regular season 6-6 under interim head coach Terry Smith.

=== Matt Campbell era (2026–present) ===
On December 5, 2025, Penn State announced the hiring of Iowa State head coach Matt Campbell as their next head coach.

== Conference affiliations ==
- Independent (1887–1890)
- Pennsylvania Intercollegiate Football Association (1891)
- Independent (1892–1992)
- Big Ten Conference (1993–present)

== Championships ==
=== National championships ===
Year	Coach	Selectors	Record	Bowl	Final AP	Final Coaches
1982	Joe Paterno	AP, Billingsley, DeVold, Dunkel, FACT, FB News, Football Research, FW, Helms, Litkenhous, Matthews, NCF, NFF, The New York Times, Poling, Sagarin, Sagarin (ELO-Chess), Sporting News, UPI/coaches, USA/CNN	11–1	Won Sugar Bowl	No. 1	No. 1
1986	Joe Paterno	AP, Billingsley, FACT, FB News, FW, Matthews, NCF, NFF, Sagarin (ELO-Chess)*, Sporting News, UPI, USA/CNN	12–0	Won Fiesta Bowl	No. 1	No. 1

Penn State has also been named national champions on seven occasions by NCAA-designated major selectors. Penn State claims the 1982 and 1986 championships under Joe Paterno's tenure, both of which are consensus national championships.

=== Conference championships ===
Historically, Penn State played as an independent from 1887 through 1890, then in 1891 as a member of the Pennsylvania Intercollegiate Football Association Penn State won the PIFA championship with a 4–1–0 PIFA record, losing only to Bucknell (Bucknell's record was 3–1–1). The PIFA dissolved prior to the 1892 season. Penn State then played as an independent again until joining the Big Ten Conference in 1990 and beginning play in 1993. Penn State then won its first Big Ten championship in 1994, they won two more in 2005 and 2008, and they won a fourth under James Franklin in 2016.

Year	Conference	Coach	Overall record	Conference record
1891	Pennsylvania Intercollegiate Football Association	No coach	6–2	4–1
1994	Big Ten Conference	Joe Paterno	12–0	8–0
2005†	Big Ten Conference	Joe Paterno	11–1	7–1
2008†	Big Ten Conference	Joe Paterno	11–2	7–1
2016	Big Ten Conference	James Franklin	11–3	8–1

† Co-champions

=== Division championships ===
Year	Division	Coach	CG Opponent	CG result
2011†	Big Ten – Leaders	Joe Paterno	N/A lost tiebreaker to Wisconsin	
2016†	Big Ten – East	James Franklin	Wisconsin	W 38–31

† Co-champions

=== Honored teams ===
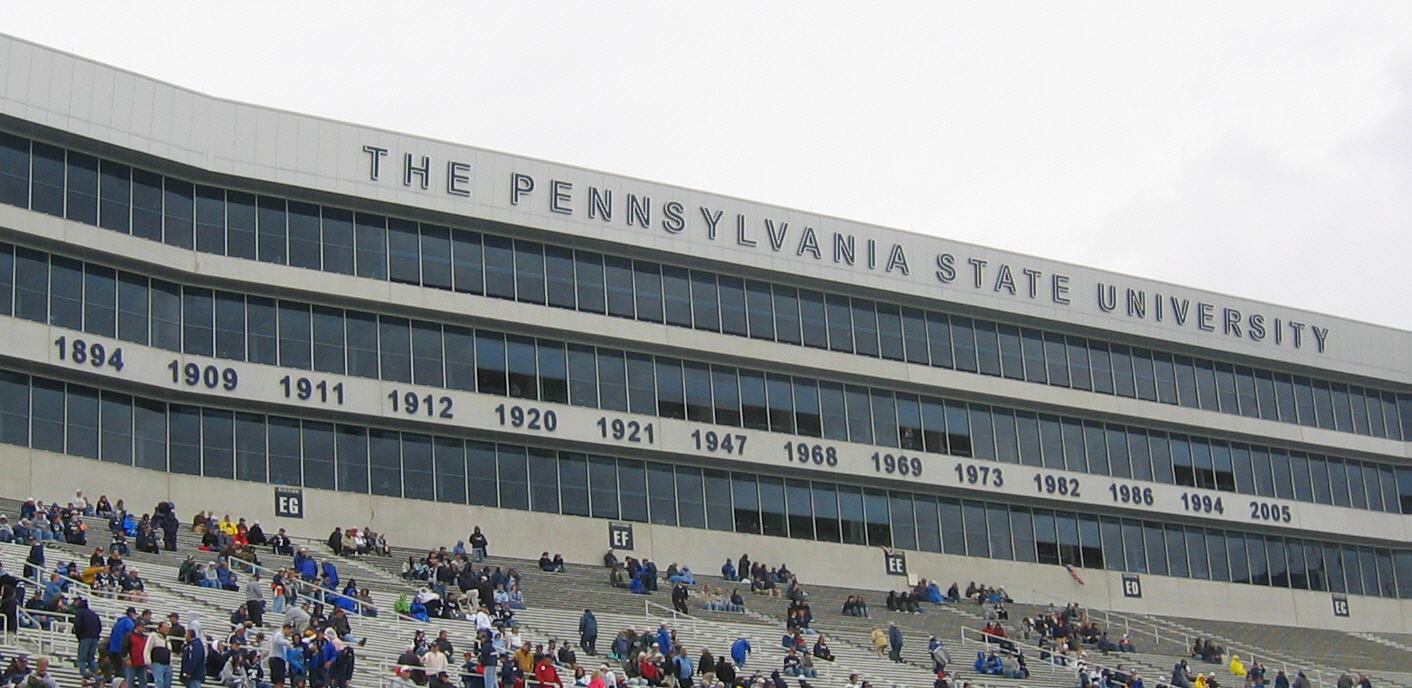
The suite boxes on the east side of Beaver Stadium feature highlighted years of undefeated and championship seasons, which were added in 2006

Before the 2006 season, Beaver Stadium was updated and seasons of note were honored by being listed in front of the suite façade. The following seasons are highlighted;

Year	Coach	Record	Notes
1894	George W. Hoskins	6–0–1	Undefeated Record
1909	Bill Hollenback	5–0–2	Undefeated Record
1911	Bill Hollenback	8–0–1	Undefeated Record
1912	Bill Hollenback	8–0	Perfect Season
1920	Hugo Bezdek	7–0–2	Undefeated Record
1921	Hugo Bezdek	8–0–2	Undefeated Record
1947	Bob Higgins	9–0–1	Undefeated Record
1968	Joe Paterno	11–0	Perfect Season
1969	Joe Paterno	11–0	Perfect Season
1973	Joe Paterno	12–0	Perfect Season
1982	Joe Paterno	11–1	National Champions
1986	Joe Paterno	12–0	Perfect Season, National Champions
1994	Joe Paterno	12–0	Perfect Season, Big Ten Champions
2005	Joe Paterno	11–1	Big Ten Champions
2008	Joe Paterno	11–2	Big Ten Champions
2012	Bill O'Brien	8–4	
2016	James Franklin	11–3	Big Ten Champions

== Bowl games ==
Penn State has earned invitations to 56 bowl games. The Nittany Lions have compiled a bowl record of 33–21–2 (.600), including a 18–8–1 (.685) record in the major bowls (Rose, Orange, Sugar, Fiesta, and Cotton).

Coach Joe Paterno was responsible for most of these bids and victories, compiling more appearances (37) than any other coach in college football en route to his bowl record of 24–12–1 (.662). Paterno also has a record of 14–5 (.737) in "major" bowls and is the only coach to have won all five major college bowls during his career.

Season	Coach	Bowl	Opponent	Result
1922	Hugo Bezdek	Rose Bowl	USC	L 3–14
1947	Bob Higgins	Cotton Bowl Classic	SMU	T 13–13
1959	Rip Engle	Liberty Bowl	Alabama	W 7–0
1960	Rip Engle	Liberty Bowl	Oregon	W 14–12
1961	Rip Engle	Gator Bowl	Georgia Tech	W 30–15
1962	Rip Engle	Gator Bowl	Florida	L 7–17
1967	Joe Paterno	Gator Bowl	Florida State	T 17–17
1968	Joe Paterno	Orange Bowl	Kansas	W 15–14
1969	Joe Paterno	Orange Bowl	Missouri	W 10–3
1971	Joe Paterno	Cotton Bowl Classic	Texas	W 30–6
1972	Joe Paterno	Sugar Bowl	Oklahoma	L 0–14
1973	Joe Paterno	Orange Bowl	LSU	W 16–9
1974	Joe Paterno	Cotton Bowl Classic	Baylor	W 41–20
1975	Joe Paterno	Sugar Bowl	Alabama	L 6–13
1976	Joe Paterno	Gator Bowl	Notre Dame	L 9–20
1977	Joe Paterno	Fiesta Bowl	Arizona State	W 42–30
1978	Joe Paterno	Sugar Bowl	Alabama	L 7–14
1979	Joe Paterno	Liberty Bowl	Tulane	W 9–6
1980	Joe Paterno	Fiesta Bowl	Ohio State	W 31–19
1981	Joe Paterno	Fiesta Bowl	USC	W 26–10
1982	Joe Paterno	Sugar Bowl	Georgia	W 27–23
1983	Joe Paterno	Aloha Bowl	Washington	W 13–10
1985	Joe Paterno	Orange Bowl	Oklahoma	L 10–25
1986	Joe Paterno	Fiesta Bowl	Miami (FL)	W 14–10
1987	Joe Paterno	Citrus Bowl	Clemson	L 10–35
1989	Joe Paterno	Holiday Bowl	BYU	W 50–39
1990	Joe Paterno	Blockbuster Bowl	Florida State	L 17–24
1991	Joe Paterno	Fiesta Bowl	Tennessee	W 42–17
1992	Joe Paterno	Blockbuster Bowl	Stanford	L 3–24
1993	Joe Paterno	Citrus Bowl	Tennessee	W 31–13
1994	Joe Paterno	Rose Bowl	Oregon	W 38–20
1995	Joe Paterno	Outback Bowl	Auburn	W 43–14
1996	Joe Paterno	Fiesta Bowl	Texas	W 38–15
1997	Joe Paterno	Citrus Bowl	Florida	L 6–21
1998	Joe Paterno	Outback Bowl	Kentucky	W 26–14
1999	Joe Paterno	Alamo Bowl	Texas A&M	W 24–0
2002	Joe Paterno	Capital One Bowl	Auburn	L 9–13
2005	Joe Paterno	Orange Bowl	Florida State	W 26–23 ^{3OT}
2006	Joe Paterno	Outback Bowl	Tennessee	W 20–10
2007	Joe Paterno	Alamo Bowl	Texas A&M	W 24–17
2008	Joe Paterno	Rose Bowl	USC	L 24–38
2009	Joe Paterno	Capital One Bowl	LSU	W 19–17
2010	Joe Paterno	Outback Bowl	Florida	L 24–37
2011	Tom Bradley (interim)	TicketCity Bowl	Houston	L 14–30
2014	James Franklin	Pinstripe Bowl	Boston College	W 31–30 ^{OT}
2015	James Franklin	TaxSlayer Bowl	Georgia	L 17–24
2016	James Franklin	Rose Bowl †	USC	L 49–52
2017	James Franklin	Fiesta Bowl †	Washington	W 35–28
2018	James Franklin	Citrus Bowl	Kentucky	L 24–27
2019	James Franklin	Cotton Bowl Classic †	Memphis	W 53–39
2021	James Franklin	Outback Bowl	Arkansas	L 10–24
2022	James Franklin	Rose Bowl †	Utah	W 35–21
2023	James Franklin	Peach Bowl †	Ole Miss	L 25–38
2024	James Franklin	CFP First Round †	SMU	W 38–10
2024	James Franklin	Fiesta Bowl †	Boise State	W 31–14
2024	James Franklin	Orange Bowl †	Notre Dame	L 24–27
2025	Terry Smith (interim)	Pinstripe Bowl	Clemson	W 22–10

† CFP/New Year's Six game

== Head coaches ==
Matt Campbell head coach of Penn State after James Franklin was fired during the 2025 season.

Coach	Years	Seasons	Record	Pct.	Cnf. record	Pct.	Cnf. Titles	Bowls	Nat. Titles
No coach	1887–1891	5	12–8–1	.595	4–1–0	.800	1		
George Hoskins	1892–1895	4	17–4–4	.760					
Samuel Newton	1896–1898	3	12–14–0	.462					
Sam Boyle	1899	1	4–6–1	.409					
Pop Golden	1900–1902	3	16–12–1	.569					
Daniel A. Reed	1903	1	5–3–0	.625					
Tom Fennell	1904–1908	5	33–17–1	.657					
Bill Hollenback	1909, 1911–1914	5	28–9–4	.732					2
Jack Hollenback	1910	1	5–2–1	.688					
Dick Harlow	1915–1917	3	20–8–0	.714					
Hugo Bezdek	1918–1929	12	65–30–11	.665				1	
Bob Higgins	1930–1948	19	91–57–11	.607				1	
Joe Bedenk	1949	1	5–4–0	.556					
Rip Engle	1950–1965	16	104–48–4	.679				4	
Joe Paterno	1966–2011	45	409–136–3	.749	95–54–0	.638	3	37	2
Tom Bradley	2011 (int.)	<1	1–3	.250	1–2	.333		1	
Bill O'Brien	2012–2013	2	15–9	.625	10–6	.625			
James Franklin	2014–2025	12	104–45	.698	64–33	.663	1	11	
Terry Smith	2025 (int.)	<1	4–3	.571	3–3	.500		1	
Matt Campbell	2026–present		0–0	–	0–0	–			

== Rivalries ==
=== Maryland ===
Penn State and Maryland met in briefly interrupted stretches between 1917 and 1993, with a near-consecutive run played all but three years (1976, 1981, and 1983) between 1960 and 1993. However, the one-sided record belies what was often a competitive matchup until its final years. While Maryland only compiled one win and one tie, numerous games were narrowly lost by missed field goals and turnovers. In 1975, a field goal attempt by kicker Mike Sochko hit the upright with under a minute left, and Maryland lost 15–13. Ten years later, the Terps missed three field goals to eventually lose 20–18. After the Nittany Lions' move to the Big Ten Conference in 1993, the series was canceled. However, Maryland ended up joining the Big Ten as well, in 2014, reinstating the rivalry after more than 2 decades of being dormant. Maryland would win the first matchup by a point (20–19) after infamously declining to shake hands with Penn State captains at midfield during the coin toss at Beaver Stadium.

The second meeting as conference foes would be played in Baltimore at M&T Bank Stadium and would again be decided by a point, this time a Penn State win 31–30. The last four matchups (2016–2019), all victories for Penn State have seen the Nittany Lions outscore the Terrapins by a combined score of 201–20 (38–14, 66–3, 38–3, 59–0). The latest match up was played on November 30, 2024, at Beaver Stadium, with Penn State winning 44–7. Penn State leads the series 44–3–1 through the 2024 season.

=== Michigan ===
Prior to 1993, Penn State had never played against Michigan, but since then many of the games have been competitive duels with shots at a Big Ten title at stake, and subsequently a national championship. Michigan leads the series, 17–10.

=== Michigan State ===
Since 1993, Penn State has played Michigan State for the Land Grant Trophy. Penn State holds possession of the trophy after winning the 2023 contest. Penn State leads the series, 19–18–1 as of 2024.

=== Minnesota ===
When Penn State joined the Big Ten in 1993, Minnesota was the first conference opponent they played. To commemorate this, the governors of both states commissioned a trophy called the Governor's Victory Bell to landmark this event. Since then, the trophy has traveled hands between the winners of each contest. Penn State leads the series, 11–6.

=== Ohio State ===
The rivalry began before Penn State was a member of the Big Ten. Penn State won the first four meetings of the series, which were held between 1912 and 1964. Then Ohio State won in 1975 in a game held in Columbus, Ohio and again in 1976 during the first ever matchup between the two teams in State College, Pennsylvania. Penn State and Ohio State would meet again in 1980 in their first and only postseason bowl, the 1980 Fiesta Bowl, which Penn State won. After the Fiesta Bowl, the two teams would not meet again until Penn State joined the Big Ten in 1993. Since then, the Nittany Lions and Buckeyes have played each other annually. Ohio State leads the series 25–14 through the 2024 season.

=== Pittsburgh ===
This is a long-standing series between in-state rivals Penn State and Pittsburgh. The rivalry, once one of the fiercest and most important in college football north of the Mason–Dixon line, began on November 6, 1893, at the inaugural game of Beaver Field in State College, and Penn State won the contest 32–0. The first two decades of the series was dominated by Penn State taking 12 of 15 matchups between 1893 and 1912. From 1913 to 1949 Pitt would hold a 26–6–2 advantage, before Rip Engle took over as head coach for Penn State in 1950. With Joe Paterno as an assistant coach, Engle led Penn State to a 9–6–1 record against the Panthers from 1950 to 1965. When Paterno was named head coach in 1965, the next 31 games would swing heavily in the Nittany Lion's favor, holding a 23–7–1 advantage from 1966 to 2000.

The rivalry went on a 15-year hiatus prior to the scheduling of a 4-game series in 2011 that would see Penn State travel to Pittsburgh in 2016 & 2018 with Pitt returning to Happy Valley in 2017 & 2019. The series was branded the Keystone Classic in 2016, which saw Pitt hold on for a thrilling 42–39 victory fending off a fierce fourth quarter comeback that fell short on an interception late in the 4th quarter. The Nittany Lions would take the final three games, winning 33–14 in 2017, 51–6 in 2018, and most recently 17–10 in Beaver Stadium in 2019.

There are no future games scheduled between the two schools, although there is talk of a potential neutral site matchup sometime in the future. The Nittany Lions and Panthers have met on the football field 100 times. Penn State holds a 10-win advantage in the series, 53–43–4, through the 2024 season.

=== Syracuse ===
The rivalry started in 1922, when Syracuse fought Penn State to a scoreless tie. But it was during the 1950s and 1960s that the rivalry intensified, as it enjoyed a competitive and often controversial string of contests. Syracuse football was led by Ben Schwartzwalder, and Penn State by Rip Engle, then Joe Paterno. From 1950 to 1970, Syracuse won 11 games to Penn State's 10.

After Schwartzwalder retired in 1973, Syracuse floundered. Penn State won 16 straight from 1971 to 1986. Conference realignment and scheduling disagreements also dampened the intensity of the rivalry. Penn State fans and players increasingly turned their attention to the rivalry with Pittsburgh.

In 1987, Coach Dick MacPherson finally led Syracuse to a resounding 48–21 victory over the Nittany Lions in the Carrier Dome. Syracuse won again the following year in Happy Valley but lost the last two games before the series was suspended in 1991. The rivalry has since been renewed three times since the series suspension — in 2008, 2009, and 2013. The Nittany Lions won all three of these contests. Penn State leads the series 43–23–5 with the most recent game played in 2013. Next meeting between the two teams is scheduled for September 4, 2027.

=== West Virginia ===
Penn State and West Virginia have played each other 59 times. The first game was in 1904 when Penn State won that game 34–0. In their most recent encounter on August 31, 2024, Penn State won 34–12 in Morgantown. This series has been dominated by the Nittany Lions who lead the series 50–9–2.

=== Historic series ===
==== Alabama ====
Though the Crimson Tide are not as much of a traditional opponent for the Nittany Lions, the two teams are still often considered among the best in the country, claim a combined 20 national titles (of which 18 belong to Alabama), and have met in a bowl game three times. The series began on December 19, 1959, in that year's edition of the Liberty Bowl, a 7–0 win for No. 12 Penn State. Sixteen years later, the Nittany Lions and Crimson Tide met in the 1975 Sugar Bowl, resulting in a 13–6 Tide victory in New Orleans. Perhaps the most notable game between these two teams came four years later, in a 1979 Sugar Bowl rematch, resulting in another Alabama victory. The rivalry was intensified during the 1980s, when the Lions and Tide met in 10 consecutive seasons, all during regular season play. After this time, the rivalry went dormant for two decades before being renewed for a 2-game home-and-home series in 2010 and 2011. Alabama leads the series 10–5 with the last game played in 2011.

=== "Unrivaled" ===
Due to Penn State being independent for most of the program's existence, it has been noted for not having a "true rival" in the Big Ten. In 2015, the university acquired a trademark for the term "unrivaled", which has since been used in team merchandise, media posts, and other forms of branding. Since 2014, a weekly preview program has been produced during football season known as "Unrivaled: The Penn State Football Story", and many team social media posts have been concluded with "#PSUnrivaled".

== Traditions ==
=== White Out ===
The White Out tradition dates back to a student section white out in 2004 against Purdue, and has become one of the most eagerly anticipated games during the football season. In recent years, Penn State supporters have donned white clothes, paint, and other white accessories to show their solidarity and support for the Nittany Lions. White Outs have spread to other Penn State sports, with students having "Whited Out" Beaver Stadium, the Bryce Jordan Center and other sports venues, making them some of the noisiest and most intimidating stadiums in America.

Beano Cook of ESPN says, "If you aren't impressed with the White Out, you're probably one of those people who think the moon landing was faked."

=== Nittanyville ===
Originally named "Paternoville", Nittanyville is a student camp out that occurs every week of a Penn State home football game. The students camp out to support the team and to acquire the best possible seats for the weekend's upcoming game, since seating is first-come, first serve for students. While the name "Paternoville" came about during Penn State's 2005 football season, students have long camped out for first row seats. Prior to 1993, the university distributed non-seat-specific tickets. Starting the same year Penn State football began competition in the Big Ten Conference, students were assigned seats on a first-come-first-serve basis, so that the first students to pass through "Gate A" at the south-east corner of the stadium would be assigned first row seats, and so on down the line. Since then, students have camped out in small to massive numbers in order to guarantee themselves a front row seat to a Penn State home football game.

The 2005 season saw the naming of the tent-city. In anticipation of the 2005 contest between No. 16 Penn State and No. 6 Ohio State, students began camping six days in advance of the game outside the gate so that they would get a first row seat for, arguably, the biggest game of the 2005 season for Penn State. On Tuesday of the week preceding the game, "Paternoville" first appeared. Credited with the naming, freshman Dan Clark and the other students camping with him created a banner reading "Paternoville".

The name stuck, and on Wednesday morning, October 5, 2005, newspapers were already referring to the campsite as "Paternoville". State-wide, regional, and even national media outlets began paying attention to the show in front of Gate A. Local businesses printed t-shirts up for the students, brought truckloads of food, and distributed various things like magazines and small footballs to keep the students occupied. Throughout the week, players, coaches, and many alumni and media personalities paid visits to Paternoville.

On Friday, ESPN's "Cold Pizza" morning show was broadcast from in front of the Bryce Jordan Center, across from the stadium, with some of the cast walking through Paternoville interviewing students and taping their activities, despite the constant drizzle. The next day, ESPN's College Gameday also was broadcast in front of the Bryce Jordan Center, hours before the showdown between the cross-border rivals.

Before noon, the tents were packed away and hundreds of students began to line up for entry into the stadium. That night, in a historic game, the Nittany Lions upset the No. 6 ranked Buckeyes 17–10 in front of a crowd of almost 110,000. The game being decided on a fumble by Ohio State quarterback and future Heisman Trophy winner Troy Smith, caused by Penn State defensive end Tamba Hali and recovered by defensive tackle Scott Paxson. After the final whistle, the students rushed the field.

The Paternoville name continued after the game. Since the original "Paternoville", two other games have garnered comparable camp-outs. They were the 2005 game against the University of Wisconsin Badgers, which was Senior Day for the 2005 season, and the 2006 contest against University of Michigan Wolverines. However, students camp out for every game, not solely the "big" games. On average, about 10–15 tents appear for every game, while the number of tents for the 2005 Ohio State and Wisconsin games and the 2006 Michigan game exceeded 100.

Prior to the 2006 season, the university placed several markers around Beaver Stadium commemorating various traditions related to Penn State football. To the left of Gate A there is a marker for the Penn State "student section" and to the right of the gate there is a marker for "Paternoville".

Since 2006, the practice of camping out has grown every year until 2009, when over 2,000 different students camped out for one or multiple games throughout the season. In 2011, the record was broken because of Penn State's high-powered home schedule, which included SEC powerhouse Alabama and new in-conference foe Nebraska, amongst other teams.

In the summer of 2012, "Paternoville" officially became "Nittanyville". As Coach Paterno was no longer the coach of Penn State's football team, the organization decided that since it was unlikely another coach would stay as long as Coach Paterno had, changing the name for each new coach would be impractical. However, aside from the name, nothing was changed and students continued to support the team and camp out for the primary seats.

=== Success with Honor ===
Joe Paterno was widely known for his "grand experiment" in which he challenged his players to be successful both on the field and in the classroom. In 2011, the Nittany Lion football team posted an 87% graduation rate, tied with Stanford for No. 10 overall among the nation's 120 Football Bowl Subdivision (FBS) institutions, above the national average of 67%.

The June 2012 conviction of former assistant coach Jerry Sandusky on multiple counts of child sexual abuse marred the "Success with Honor" image. President Rodney Erickson, athletics director Dave Joyner, and head football coach Bill O'Brien, all of whom accepted their jobs in the wake of the scandal, have made statements in which they express commitment to maintaining integrity at the university and within the athletics programs.

In 2013, a group of alumni and supporters established a non-profit organization to build upon the "Success with Honor" motto. Their mission was to promote and support charitable endeavors by connecting individuals with organizations to which they would like to devote their skills, time, or money. SWH also assisted charities in finding individuals to meet their needs.

In 2022, the university used the motto as the name of its newly launched NIL collective.

=== Uniform ===
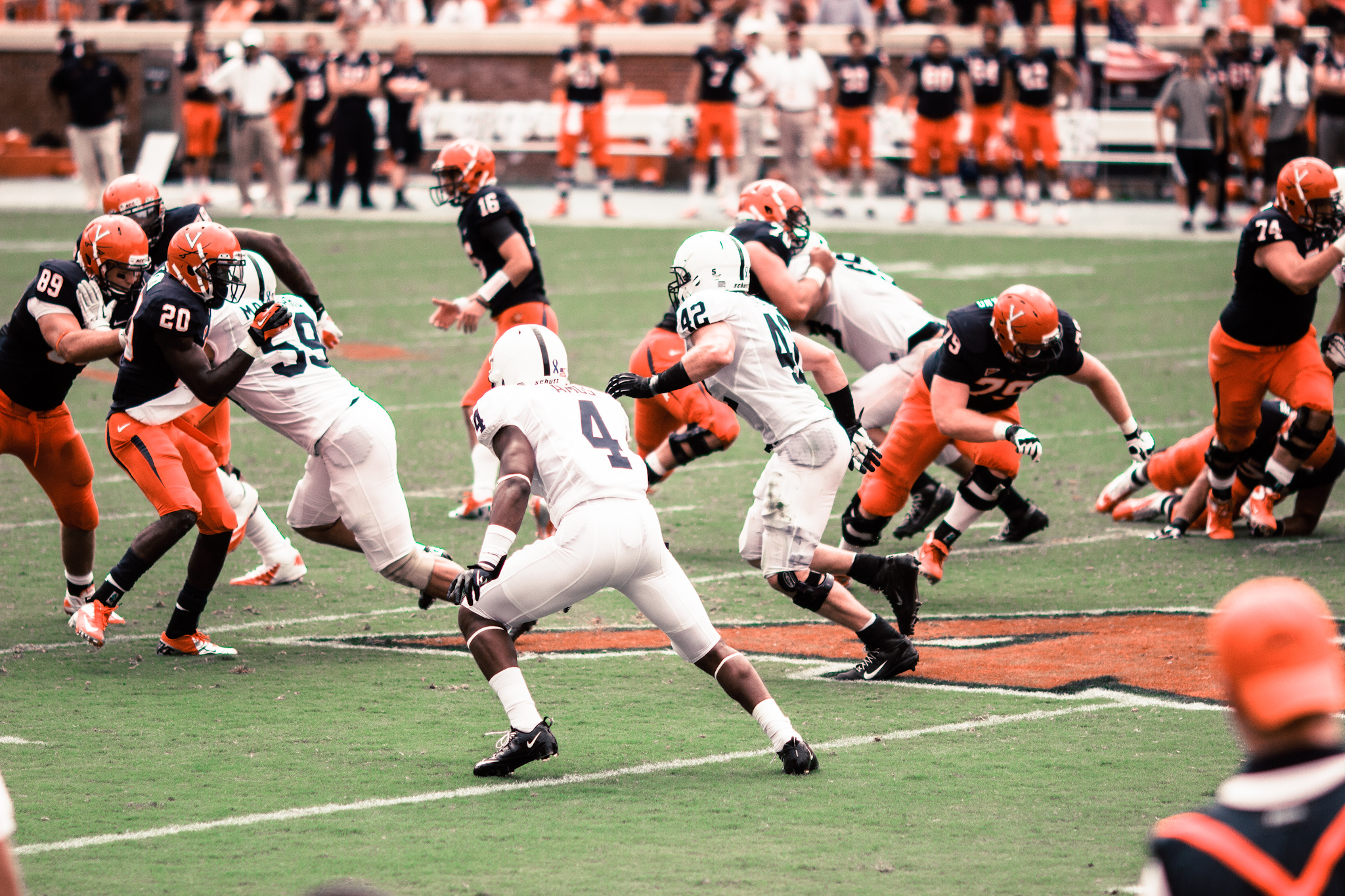
The Nittany Lions, wearing their simple uniforms worn during away games, playing Virginia at Scott Stadium in September 2012

The team is widely noted for their simple game uniforms. They only wear white pants, and the jerseys are simple blue for home games, and white for away games. The team is only allowed to wear simple black Nike shoes with white calf socks for game days, though blue tights are permitted underneath the white socks for cold weather games. The helmet is white with a blue stripe down the center, and a blue on white "Penn State" sticker covers up the forehead helmet logo. No team logos, conference logos, numbers, or other stickers are permitted on the helmet, though two Nike logos are on facemask visors that some players choose to wear. Penn State has started to wear bowl decals only starting with 1997 Fiesta Bowl. Before that, Penn State always declined the decals so they can play out of their simple game uniforms.

The blue and white uniforms replaced the school's original colors, pink and black, in 1890 after a student referendum. A common legend of the color change is that the original colors faded in the sun. Black became a hue of navy blue and the pink became such a light hue that it appeared white. The historicity of this, however, is very questionable, as evidence of it being the root cause is scarce.

The uniforms became even simpler for the 2011 season, as the white cuffs and collars on the home jerseys and the corresponding blue cuffs and collars on the road jerseys were eliminated, leaving the jerseys solid blue and white, respectively.

In 2012, Penn State started wearing names on their uniforms for the first time as a way to note the players who stuck with the school through the scandal and a blue ribbon in support the victims of child abuse.

In 2013, the Nittany Lion logo was added to the base of the jersey collar along with the Big Ten logo on the right side of the jersey.

Starting in 2015, the names that were added throughout the 2012–14 seasons to honor those who stayed with the program were removed and the team reverted to the traditional nameless jerseys while still retaining the Nittany Lion logo at the base of the jersey collar. The team also began sporting new Nike Elite 51 jerseys which feature a new design on the collars. In addition, the team added the words "Nittany Lions" onto the back of the football helmets.

For the 2017 homecoming game against the Indiana Hoosiers, Penn State broke tradition by donning throwback jerseys in what was dubbed the "Generations of Greatness" game. These uniforms integrated elements from past uniforms, including: numbers on helmets' sides, block uniform numbers, white stripes on sleeves, blue stripes on pants, striped socks, gray facemasks, white cleats, and a few other subtle changes.

=== Captains ===
Captains are chosen by the team, with the head coach's approval. Being named a captain is an honor almost always given to a senior, but there are some notable exceptions: Linebacker Sean Lee was named a captain in the beginning of Spring practice in 2008, the beginning of his 4th year with the team. However, he suffered a torn ACL during spring practice, redshirted in 2008, and returned as a captain again in 2009. The most recent example of a "true" junior being named was Paul Posluszny, who was named a captain in both 2005 and 2006, his junior and senior years, respectively. The last time a junior was named captain before Posluszny was in 1968, when Steve Smear and Mike Reid were named captains during their junior years. In 2014, Christian Hackenberg became the first true sophomore to be named team captain.

=== Linebacker U ===
Penn State is referred to as Linebacker U for its reputation of producing outstanding linebackers.

- Dennis Onkotz was a two-time All American in 1968 and 1969 and played on two undefeated teams.
- Jack Ham finished his career with 251 tackles, blocked two punts and went on to play on two undefeated teams. Ham later went on to the NFL, playing for the Pittsburgh Steelers, and was inducted into the Pro Football Hall of Fame.
- Charlie Zapiec a fourth round draft pick of the Dallas Cowboys, went on to star in the Canadian Football League as a linebacker with the Montreal Alouettes coached by future NFL Legend Marv Levy. Zapiec switched from offensive guard in his senior year and also received All-American honors; in the two years he started as a guard and the one year as a linebacker, he accumulated 34 wins, including three major bowl victories, while suffering only one loss, the best record for a starter at Penn State.
- Edward William O'Neil, an American football coach and former professional linebacker, played seven seasons in the National Football League (NFL). From 1970 to 1973, he played linebacker at Penn State. A three-year letterman, he was team captain of the Nittany Lions' undefeated 1973 team and was named an All-American that same season.
- Greg Buttle was a linebacker during the 1973–1975 seasons, finishing with 305 tackles in his junior and senior year. He was drafted by the New York Jets and is a part of the All Jet team.
- Shane Conlan was a two-time All-American and defensive MVP of the 1987 National Championship Fiesta Bowl. He was selected by the Buffalo Bills as the eighth pick in the first round of the 1987 NFL draft, named NFL Defensive Rookie of the Year and was named to three straight Pro Bowls (1988–90).
- Lavar Arrington finished with 319 career tackles and 139 tackles for losses. He was later drafted second overall by the Washington Redskins.
- Cameron Wake, known as Derek Wake when at Penn State, went on to capture MVP honors for the British Columbia Lions in the Canadian Football League before moving on to the Miami Dolphins and leading the National Football League in sacks during the 2010 season.
- Tamba Hali was the 20th overall pick in the 2006 NFL draft and led the AFC in sacks during the 2010 NFL season, helping the Kansas City Chiefs reach the playoffs. He played defensive end during his college career.
- Paul Posluszny played from 2003 to 2006. Posluszny won the Dick Butkus Award in 2005 and the Chuck Bednarik Award in 2005 and 2006. He finished with 372 tackles and was drafted by the Buffalo Bills. Also played for the Jacksonville Jaguars before retiring after 2017 season.
- Dan Connor finished his career as the all-time leading tackler for Penn State with 419 and was drafted by the Carolina Panthers.
- Sean Lee graduated from Penn State in 2009 and is an inside linebacker for the Dallas Cowboys.
- NaVorro Bowman, drafted by the San Francisco 49ers in the third round of the 2010 draft, ranked seventh in the league in tackles in 2011 and was named an AP first team All-Pro for his 2011 campaign. Bowman played for the Oakland Raiders.
- Michael Mauti and Gerald Hodges were "Co-Linebacker U" in 2012, both achieved over 95 tackles and both were drafted by the Minnesota Vikings.
- Micah Parsons, opted out of the 2020 College Football Season He was the first linebacker taken in the 2021 NFL draft, being drafted by the Dallas Cowboys with the 11th overall pick.

== 2011 child sex abuse scandal ==
The scandal centered on then retired Penn State football assistant coach Jerry Sandusky's sexual assault of two underage boys on or near university property. After a grand jury investigation, Sandusky was indicted on 52 counts of child molestation dating from 1994. The trial started on June 11, 2012, at the Centre County Courthouse in Bellefonte, Pennsylvania, and ended on June 22, when the jury found Sandusky guilty on 45 counts. On October 9, 2012, Sandusky was sentenced to 30–60 years in prison. Several high-level school officials were charged with perjury, suspended, or dismissed for allegedly covering up the incidents or failing to notify authorities. School president Graham Spanier was forced to resign, and head football coach Joe Paterno was fired without cause late in the season, while Sandusky maintained his innocence.

Former FBI director Louis Freeh, whose firm was hired by the Penn State Board of Trustees to conduct an investigation, concluded, after ostensibly conducting 400 interviews and reviewing 3.5 million documents, that Paterno, Spanier, Curley and Schultz had "repeatedly concealed critical facts relating to Sandusky's abuse from the authorities, the Board of Trustees, Penn State community, and the public at large." In an interview on 60 Minutes Sports, the former Chief Deputy Attorney General of Pennsylvania, Frank Fina, who investigated and prosecuted Sandusky, stated he found no evidence that Paterno participated in a cover-up.

In July 2012, NCAA announced it had fined the Penn State football program $60 million, levied a 4-year ban from bowl games and vacated all the program's 112 wins from 1998 to 2011. The program was originally scheduled to lose 10 scholarships from incoming classes in 2013–16, which would have been a loss of 40 scholarships. In September 2013, the NCAA announced they were restoring 25 of the 40 scholarships to Penn State "[d]ue to Penn State University's continued progress toward ensuring athletics integrity". After losing 10 scholarships from the 2013–2014 incoming class and only having 75 total players on scholarship, Penn State gained five scholarships back for 2014–15, bringing in 20 new players with 80 total on scholarship. Full scholarships were regained for 2016–17. In total they lost only 15 scholarships. The decision to return the scholarships was by the executive committee of the NCAA following a recommendation from former US Sen. George Mitchell. The NCAA had appointed Mitchell to monitor progress of Penn State's reforms to enhance their "security, ethics, governance and compliance structure". The decision was based upon the belief the restored scholarships would provide benefits to student-athletes. Lawsuits were filed against NCAA related to the levy of penalties. In 2014 the NCAA, under the auspices of favorable reports from Mitchell, announced that Penn State would be eligible for the 2014 postseason and all scholarships restored in 2015. The team's wins and records that had been vacated were restored, pending full approval, as part of a legal settlement in 2015.

== Individual award winners ==
=== Retired numbers ===
Penn State Nittany Lions retired numbers
No.	Player	Pos.	Tenure	Date ret.	Ref.
22	John Cappelletti	RB	1970–1973	September 7, 2013	

=== Players ===
- Heisman Trophy

John Cappelletti – 1973

- Maxwell Award

Richie Lucas – 1959
Glenn Ressler – 1964
Mike Reid – 1969
John Cappelletti – 1973
Chuck Fusina – 1978
Kerry Collins – 1994
Larry Johnson – 2002

- Walter Camp Award

John Cappelletti – 1973
Larry Johnson – 2002

- Sammy Baugh Trophy

Kerry Collins – 1994

- Chuck Bednarik Award

LaVar Arrington – 1999
Paul Posluszny – 2005, 2006
Dan Connor – 2007

- William V. Campbell Trophy

John Urschel – 2013

- Fred Biletnikoff Award

Bobby Engram – 1994 (inaugural winner)

- Dick Butkus Award

LaVar Arrington – 1999
Paul Posluszny – 2005

- Rimington Trophy

A.Q. Shipley – 2008

- Lombardi Award

Bruce Clark – 1978
Carl Nassib – 2015

- Ted Hendricks Award

Carl Nassib – 2015

- Davey O'Brien Award

Todd Blackledge – 1982
Kerry Collins – 1994

- Outland Trophy

Mike Reid – 1969

- Doak Walker Award

Larry Johnson – 2002

- Chicago Tribune Silver Football

Kerry Collins – 1994
Michael Robinson – 2005
Daryll Clark – 2009
Saquon Barkley – 2016, 2017

- Senior CLASS Award – Football

John Urschel – 2013

- John Mackey Award

Tyler Warren – 2024

=== Coaches ===
- Amos Alonzo Stagg Award

Rip Engle – 1969
Joe Paterno – 2002

- AT&T-ESPN Coach of the Year

Bill O'Brien – 2012

- Big Ten Coach of the Year

Joe Paterno - 1994, 2005, 2008
Bill O'Brien – 2012
James Franklin – 2016

- Bobby Dodd Coach of the Year Award

Joe Paterno – 1981, 2005

- Eddie Robinson Coach of the Year

Joe Paterno – 1978, 1982, 1986

- George Munger Award

Joe Paterno – 1990, 1994, 2005

- Maxwell Coach of the Year

Bill O'Brien – 2012

- Paul "Bear" Bryant Award

Joe Paterno – 1986
Bill O'Brien – 2012

- The Home Depot Coach of the Year Award

Joe Paterno – 2005

- Walter Camp Coach of the Year

Joe Paterno – 1972, 1994, 2005

- Woody Hayes Coach of the Year

James Franklin – 2016

=== Other awards ===
- Lambert Trophy – 1947, 1961, 1962, 1964, 1967, 1968, 1969, 1971, 1972, 1973, 1974, 1975, 1977, 1978, 1981, 1982, 1985, 1986, 1989, 1990, 1991, 1994, 1996, 1997, 1998, 2005, 2008, 2009, 2013, 2016, 2017, 2019, 2022, 2023, 2024

== Hall of Fame ==
=== Pro Football Hall of Fame ===
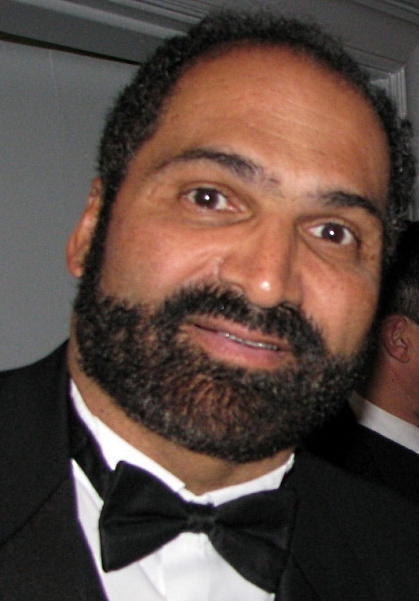
Hall of Fame RB Franco Harris

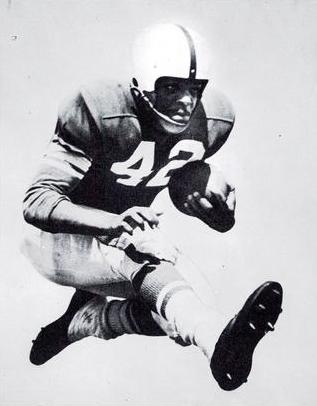
Hall of Fame RB Lenny Moore

Penn State is one of 11 schools with five or more inductees in the Pro Football Hall of Fame.

Name	Position	NFL team(s)	Inducted
Jack Ham	LB	Pittsburgh Steelers	1988
Franco Harris	RB	Pittsburgh Steelers, Seattle Seahawks	1990
Mike Michalske	G	Green Bay Packers	1964
Lenny Moore	WR/RB	Baltimore Colts	1975
Mike Munchak	G	Houston Oilers	2001
Dave Robinson	LB	Green Bay Packers, Washington Redskins	2013

=== College Football Hall of Fame ===
Including former head coach Joe Paterno, 26 Nittany Lion players and coaches have been selected for the College Football Hall of Fame.

Name	Position	Inducted
LaVar Arrington	LB	2022
Hugo Bezdek	Coach	1954
John Cappelletti	RB	1993
Kerry Collins	QB	2018
Shane Conlan	LB	2014
Keith Dorney	OT	2005
Rip Engle	Coach	1973
Jack Ham	LB	1990
Dick Harlow	Coach	1954
Bob Higgins	Coach	1954
Glenn Killinger	QB	1971
Ted Kwalick	TE	1989
Richie Lucas	QB	1986
Pete Mauthe	RB	1957
Shorty Miller	QB	1974
Lydell Mitchell	RB	2004
Dennis Onkotz	LB	1995
Joe Paterno	Coach	2007
Paul Posluszny	LB	2024
Mike Reid	DT	1987
Glenn Ressler	C/G	2001
Dave Robinson	End	1997
Steve Suhey	G	1985
Dexter Very	End	1976
Curt Warner	RB	2009
Harry Wilson	RB	1973

== Future opponents ==
Year	Non-conference opponents			Big Ten home games					Big Ten away games				
2026	Marshall (9/5)	at Temple (9/12)	Buffalo (9/19)	Minnesota	Purdue	Rutgers	USC	Wisconsin	Maryland	Michigan	Northwestern	Washington	
2027	Syracuse (9/4)	Maine (9/11)	Temple (9/18)	Maryland	Michigan	Michigan State	Washington		Illinois	Indiana	Oregon	Purdue	Wisconsin
2028	Ball State (9/2)	at Syracuse (9/9)	UMass (9/16)	Indiana	Iowa	Ohio State	Oregon	UCLA	Michigan State	Nebraska	Rutgers	USC	

== See also ==
- American football in the United States
- College football
