= Thomas F. Fennell =

American football player and boxer (1904–1991)

Biographical details
- Born: March 1, 1904; Bronx, New York, U.S.
- Died: May 23, 1991 (aged 87); New York, New York, U.S.

Playing career
- 1925: Cornell
- Position: End

Coaching career (HC unless noted)
- 1927–1931: Cornell (assistant)

Thomas Francis Fennell II (March 1, 1904 – May 23, 1991) was an American football player and boxer at Cornell University. He was inducted into the Cornell Athletic Hall of Fame in 1989.

== Life and sports career ==
Fennell was born on March 1, 1904, in Bronx, New York. At Cornell, he lettered in football at left end in 1925 and won the university's heavyweight boxing championship as a freshman, junior and senior. After obtaining his undergraduate degree from Cornell in 1926, he served as an assistant football coach under Gil Dobie from 1927 to 1931 while attending Cornell Law School, from which he earned an LLB in 1929.

An expert in labor arbitration, Fennell was first an associate and then a partner beginning in 1943 at Shearman & Sterling, a law firm in Manhattan. Fennell became of counsel to the firm in 1987. He was an innovator in arbitration and represented several private bus companies in New York City, as well as many other clients.

From 1972 to 1988, Fennell handled arbitration involving the Algerian National Oil Company and the construction of a pipeline by a consortium of French and Italian companies. Other clients included Godfrey Stillman Rockefeller, grandson of William Rockefeller, and the Georgia-Pacific corporation.

Fennell died in 1991 in his Manhattan apartment of a cardiac arrest. Fennell's uncle, Thomas Francis Fennell, 1896 Cornell graduate, is also a Cornell Athletic Hall of Famer.
