= Melanie Fennell =

British psychologist

Melanie J Fennell was a psychologist from the United Kingdom. She is known for her work on the main model of working with low self esteem in Cognitive Behavioural Therapy (CBT).

== Background ==
Fennell did her PhD in the UK. She is a Founding Fellow of the Oxford Cognitive Therapy Centre. She serves as an Associate Trainer at the Oxford Mindfulness Centre.

== Work ==
Fennel contributed to the development of evidence-based treatments for depression and anxiety disorders, including MBCT as a research clinician while she was at the University of Oxford in the Department of Psychiatry.

In 1997, she developed the cognitive behavioral model of low self-esteem which describes a framework to address the core components of low self-esteem. In 2013, she became an honorary fellow of the British Association of Behavioural and Cognitive Psychotherapies (BABCP).

She designed the syllabus for the diploma course at Oxford. She also published many papers on CBT.

== Honours ==
She was voted “Most Influential Female UK Cognitive Therapist” by the BABCP's membership in 2002.
