= Pop Golden =

American football and baseball coach

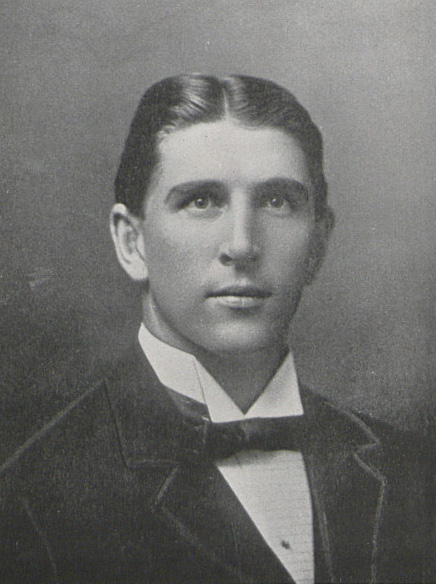
- Golden pictured in La Vie 1920, Penn State yearbook

Biographical details
- Born: July 3, 1868; Athens, Ohio, U.S.
- Died: August 31, 1949 (aged 81); Pittsburgh, Pennsylvania, U.S.

Coaching career (HC unless noted)

Football
- 1900–1902: Penn State
- 1903–1909: Penn State (assistant)

Baseball
- 1903–1906: Penn State

Head coaching record
- Overall: 16–12–1 (football); 50–24–1 (baseball)

William Nelson "Pop" Golden (July 3, 1868 – August 31, 1949) was an American football and baseball coach. He served as the head football coach at Pennsylvania State University from 1900 to 1902, compiling a record of 16–12–1. Golden was also the head baseball coach at Penn State from 1903 to 1906, tallying a mark of 50–24–1. He was born in 1868 in Athens, Ohio. He died after a brief illness in 1949.

== Head coaching record ==
=== Football ===
| Year | Team | Overall | Conference | Standing | Bowl/playoffs |
|---|---|---|---|---|---|
Penn State (Independent) (1900–1902)
| 1900 | Penn State | 4–6–1 | | | |
| 1901 | Penn State | 5–3 | | | |
| 1902 | Penn State | 7–3 | | | |
| Penn State: | | 16–12–1 | | | |
| Total: | | 16–12–1 | | | |
