= Joe Bedenk =

American football and baseball player and coach (1897–1978)

- Bedenk pictured in The Campanile 1926, Rice yearbook

Biographical details
- Born: July 14, 1897
- Died: May 2, 1978 (aged 80); State College, Pennsylvania, U.S.

Playing career

Football
- 1921–1923: Penn State

Baseball
- 1922–1923: Penn State
- Position: Guard (football)

Coaching career (HC unless noted)

Football
- 1924–1926: Rice (assistant)
- 1927–1928: Florida (line)
- 1929–1948: Penn State (assistant)
- 1949: Penn State
- 1950–1951: Penn State (assistant)

Baseball
- 1925–1926: Rice
- 1931–1962: Penn State

Head coaching record
- Overall: 5–4 (football); 391–171–3 (baseball)

Accomplishments and honors

Awards
- First-team All-American (1923); Second-team All-American (1921); Third-team All-American (1922)

Fred Joseph Bedenk (July 14, 1897 – May 2, 1978) was an American college football and college baseball player and coach. He served as the head baseball coach at Rice University from 1925 to 1926 and at Pennsylvania State University from 1931 to 1962. Bedenk was also the head football coach at Penn State for one season in 1949, tallying a mark of 5–4.

== Playing career ==
Bedenk played guard for the Penn State Nittany Lions football team. He was elected team captain and earned All-America honors in 1923. He graduated from Penn State with a Bachelor of Arts in finance in 1924.

== Coaching career ==
Bedenk served for several years as Penn state's line coach before being promoted to head coach for the 1949 season. After finishing the year at 5–4, Bedenk requested a return to coaching the line and the university brought in Rip Engle as head coach, and Engle's quarterback from Brown University, Joe Paterno as an assistant coach.

== Death ==
Bedenk died on May 2, 1978, at the Mountainview Unit of Centre Community Hospital—now known as Mount Nittany Medical Center—in State College, Pennsylvania, following a long illness.

== Head coaching record ==
=== Football ===
Year	Team	Overall	Bowl/playoffs
Penn State Nittany Lions (Independent) (1949)
1949	Penn State	5–4	
Penn State:		5–4	
Total:		5–4	
