= Sam Boyle =

American football player and coach (1876–1923)

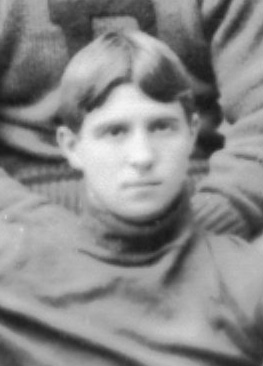
- Boyle in 1895

Biographical details
- Born: November 28, 1876; Memphis, Tennessee, U.S.
- Died: October 30, 1923 (aged 46); Rydal, Pennsylvania, U.S.

Playing career
- 1894–1897: Penn
- Position: End

Coaching career (HC unless noted)
- 1898: Pittsburgh Athletic Club
- 1898–1899: VMI
- 1899: Penn State
- 1900: Dickinson

Head coaching record
- Overall: 14–12–1 (college)

Accomplishments and honors

Awards
- Second-team All-American (1897)

Samuel Alexander Boyle Jr. (November 28, 1876 – October 30, 1923) was an American college football player and coach. He served as the head football coach at the Virginia Military Institute (1898–1899), Pennsylvania State University (1899), and Dickinson College (1900), compiling a career coaching record of 14–12–1.

== Playing career ==
Boyle played end for the University of Pennsylvania and was declared a first-team All-American in 1897.

== Coaching career ==
=== Penn State ===
Boyle was the head football coach at Pennsylvania State University for one season, 1899, compiling a record of 4–6–1.

=== Dickinson ===
After one year at Penn State, Boyle became the head football coach at Dickinson College in Carlisle, Pennsylvania. He led the 1900 Dickinson team to a record of 5–4.

== Other athletic work ==
Boyle continued to work around sports as an athletic official. He also worked as a player-coach for the Pittsburgh Athletic Club.

== Death ==
Boyle died on October 30, 1923, at his home in Rydal, Pennsylvania, after suffering from tuberculosis for more than five years.

== Head coaching record ==
=== College ===
Year	Team	Overall	Conference	Standing	Bowl/playoffs
VMI Keydets (Independent) (1898–1899)
1898	VMI	4–2			
1899	VMI	1–0			
VMI:		5–2			
Penn State (Independent) (1899)
1899	Penn State	4–6–1			
Penn State:		4–6–1			
Dickinson Red and White (Independent) (1900)
1900	Dickinson	5–4			
Dickinson:		5–4			
Total:		14–12–1			
