= Jack Hollenback =

American football player and coach (1884–1959)

Biographical details
- Born: August 10, 1884; Clearfield County, Pennsylvania, U.S.
- Died: 1959 (aged 74–75)

Playing career
- 1904: Penn

Coaching career (HC unless noted)
- 1908–1909: Franklin & Marshall
- 1910: Penn State
- 1911: Pennsylvania Military

Head coaching record
- Overall: 21–11–3

John Coffey Hollenback (August 10, 1884 – 1959) was an American football player and coach. He served as the head football coach at Franklin & Marshall College from 1908 to 1909, Pennsylvania State University in 1910, and Pennsylvania Military College, now Widener University in 1911, compiling a career college football record of 21–11–3.

Hollenback was the older brother of Bill Hollenback, who was also a head football coach at Penn State. On December 28, 1910, he married Lulu Rowland, the daughter of Charles Hedding Rowland.

== Head coaching record ==
Year	Team	Overall	Conference	Standing	Bowl/playoffs
Franklin & Marshall (Independent) (1908–1909)
1908	Franklin & Marshall	4–6–1			
1909	Franklin & Marshall	9–1			
Franklin & Marshall:		13–7–1			
Penn State Nittany Lions (Independent) (1910)
1910	Penn State	5–2–1			
Penn State:		5–2–1			
Pennsylvania Military Cadets (Independent) (1911)
1911	Pennsylvania Military	3–2–1			
Pennsylvania Military:		3–2-1			
Total:		21–11–3			
