= Bill Hollenback =

American football player and coach (1886–1968)

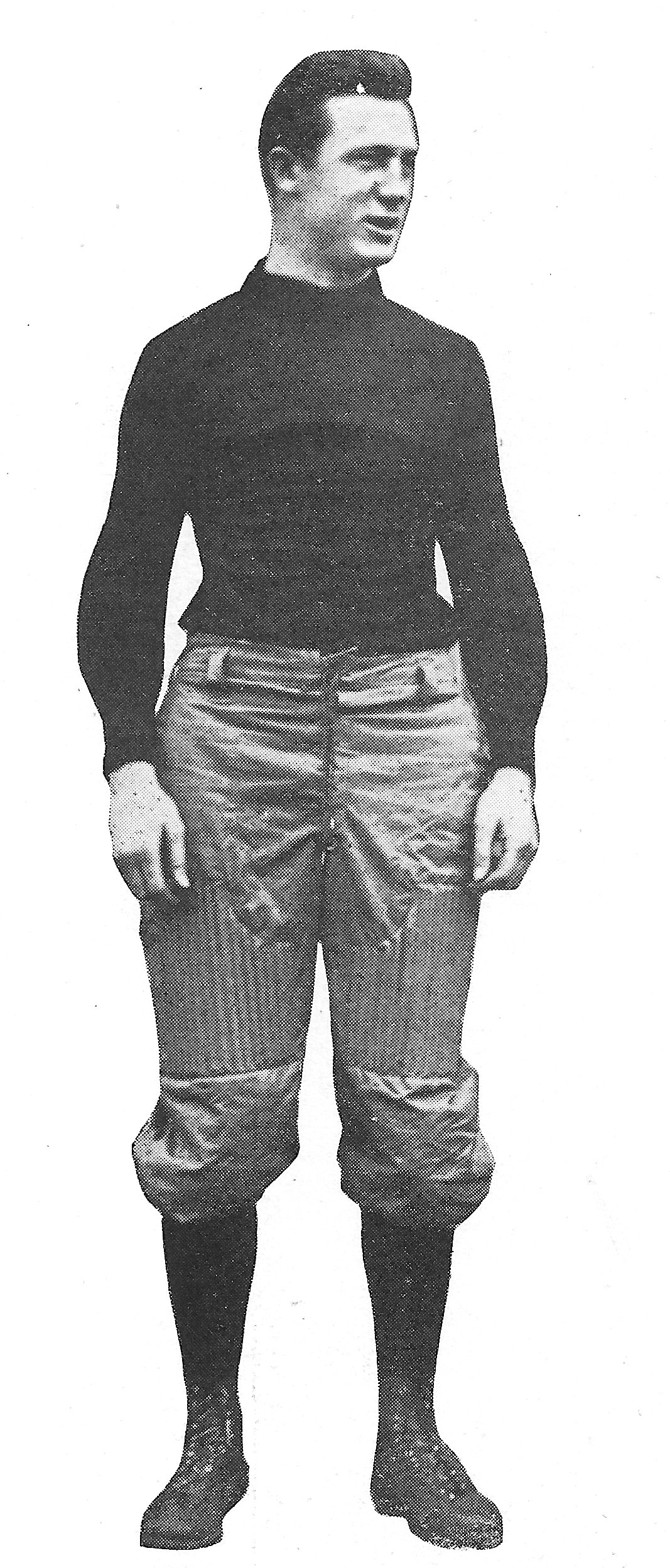
- Hollenback in 1910

Biographical details
- Born: February 22, 1886; Blue Bell, Pennsylvania, U.S.
- Died: March 12, 1968 (aged 82); Bryn Mawr, Pennsylvania, U.S.

Playing career
- 1904–1908: Penn
- 1921: Union Quakers of Philadelphia
- Positions: Fullback, end

Coaching career (HC unless noted)
- 1909: Penn State
- 1910: Missouri
- 1911–1914: Penn State
- 1912, 1915: Pennsylvania Military
- 1916: Syracuse
- 1919: Penn (assistant)

Head coaching record
- Overall: 46–19–8

Accomplishments and honors

Awards
- 2× Consensus All-American (1906, 1908); Second-team All-American (1907)
- College Football Hall of Fame; Inducted in 1951 (profile)

William Marshall "Big Bill" Hollenback (February 22, 1886 – March 12, 1968) was an American college football player and coach. He played football at the University of Pennsylvania, where he was selected as an All-American fullback three straight years, from 1906 to 1908. Hollenback served as the head football coach at Pennsylvania State University (1909, 1911–1914), the University of Missouri (1910), Pennsylvania Military College, now Widener University (1912, 1915), and Syracuse University (1916), compiling a career head coaching record of 46–19–8. He was inducted into the College Football Hall of Fame as a player in 1951.

== Early life and playing career ==
Born in Blue Bell, Pennsylvania, Hollenback attended Phillipsburg High School. As an undergraduate at the University of Pennsylvania from 1904 to 1908, he became one of the school's most renowned football players. He played end in 1904. He was unable to play during the 1905 season due to a broken leg. After returning from the injury, Hollenback was moved to the fullback, a position he played from 1906 to 1908. He was selected as an All-American fullback in each of those years. As a senior in 1908, Holleback was the captain of the undefeated Penn team that was named national champion. Jim Thorpe, whose Carlisle Indians team played Penn to a 6–6 tie in 1908, called Hollenback his "greatest and toughest opponent." In 1921, Hollenback played professional football for the Union Quakers of Philadelphia alongside future Philadelphia Eagles founder, co-owner and coach, Bert Bell. In 1925, Hollenback served as the referee for the Pottsville Maroons' 9–7 victory over the Notre Dame All-Stars, featuring the legendary Four Horsemen, at Shibe Park. The game resulted in a controversy that stripped the Maroons of their 1925 NFL championship

== Coaching career ==
Hollenback received a degree in dentistry, but opted to become a football coach after graduating from Penn. He served as the head football coach at Penn State (1909, 1911–1914), the University of Missouri (1910), Pennsylvania Military College (1915) and Syracuse University (1916). During his tenure, he compiled a 28–9–4 (.732) record.

== Business and politics ==
Hollenback served briefly as the president of the Bird Coal Company in 1914. He also owned the William M. Hollenback Coal Company. He was also active in politics, and served on the Philadelphia City Council from 1940 to 1944.

== Family and death ==
Hollenback married Marion Cressman in 1917. They had one child, William M. Hollenback, Jr. His older brother, Jack Hollenback, was also a head football coach at Penn State. Hollenback died on March 12, 1968, at Bryn Mawr Convalescent Center in Bryn Mawr, Pennsylvania.

== Head coaching record ==
| Year | Team | Overall | Conference | Standing |
|---|---|---|---|---|
Penn State Nittany Lions (Independent) (1909)
| 1909 | Penn State | 5–0–2 | | |
Missouri Tigers (Missouri Valley Intercollegiate Athletic Association) (1910)
| 1910 | Missouri | 4–2–2 | 2–1–1 | 3rd |
| Missouri: | | 4–2–2 | 2–1–1 | |
Penn State Nittany Lions (Independent) (1911–1914)
| 1911 | Penn State | 8–0–1 | | |
| 1912 | Penn State | 8–0 | | |
| 1913 | Penn State | 2–6 | | |
| 1914 | Penn State | 5–3–1 | | |
| Penn State: | | 28–9–4 | | |
Pennsylvania Military Cadets (Independent) (1912)
| 1912 | Pennsylvania Military | 5–1–2 | | |
Pennsylvania Military Cadets (Independent) (1915)
| 1915 | Pennsylvania Military | 4–3 | | |
| Pennsylvania Military: | | 9–4–2 | | |
Syracuse Orangemen (Independent) (1916)
| 1916 | Syracuse | 5–4 | | |
| Syracuse: | | 5–4 | | |
| Total: | | 46–19–8 | | |

== See also ==
- List of college football head coaches with non-consecutive tenure
