= George W. Hoskins =

American football player and sports coach (1864–1958)

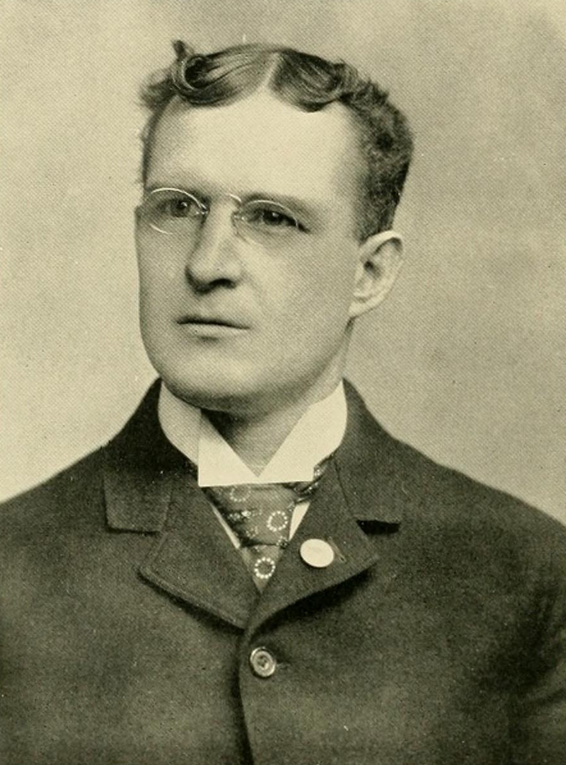
- Hoskins pictured in L'Agenda 1905, Bucknell yearbook

Biographical details
- Born: October 1864; Philadelphia, Pennsylvania, U.S.
- Died: January 22, 1958 (aged 93); Cincinnati, Ohio, U.S.

Playing career

Football
- 1892–1894: Penn State
- Position: End

Coaching career (HC unless noted)

Football
- 1892–1895: Penn State
- 1896: Pittsburgh
- 1896–1897: Pittsburgh Athletic Club
- 1899–1906: Bucknell
- 1909: Bucknell

Basketball
- 1908–1911: Bucknell

Head coaching record
- Overall: 59–48–9 (college football); 21–14 (college basketball)

George Washington "Doc" Hoskins (October 1864 – January 22, 1958) was an American football player and coach of football and basketball. He served as the head football coach at Pennsylvania State University (1892–1895), the University of Pittsburgh (1896), and Bucknell University (1899–1906, 1909), compiling a career college football record of 59–48–9. Hoskins was also the head basketball coach at Bucknell from 1908 to 1911, tallying a mark of 21–14.

== Early life ==
Hoskins was born in 1864 in Philadelphia, Pennsylvania.

== Coaching career ==
Hoskins was the first head coach for the Penn State Nittany Lions football team. While the school played football from 1887 to 1891, before his arrival, Hoskins is credited for being their first coach. During his tenure from 1892 to 1895, he compiled a 17–4–4 record. His .760 winning percentage ranks highest in school history, surpassing notable coaches such as Joe Paterno, Hugo Bezdek, and Rip Engle. He lost his first college football game at the University of Pennsylvania, and tied his final game against Western Reserve University.

He followed up his career at Penn State by becoming the third-ever head coach for the Pittsburgh Panthers in 1896. By mid-November 1896, Hoskins was called upon to become the head coach of the early professional football team, the Pittsburgh Athletic Club. He tried to salvage the team's dismal season, but instead helped guide them to a 2–5–3 record. He returned as the Pittsburgh Athletic Club's coach in 1897.

Hoskins later served as a trainer during spring training for the Cincinnati Reds. He died in 1958 in Cincinnati, Ohio.

== Head coaching record ==
=== College football ===
| Year | Team | Overall | Conference | Standing | Bowl/playoffs |
|---|---|---|---|---|---|
Penn State (Independent) (1892–1895)
| 1892 | Penn State | 5–1 | | | |
| 1893 | Penn State | 4–1 | | | |
| 1894 | Penn State | 6–0–1 | | | |
| 1895 | Penn State | 2–2–3 | | | |
| Penn State: | | 17–4–4 | | | |
Western University of Pennsylvania (Independent) (1896)
| 1896 | Western University of Pennsylvania | 3–6 | | | |
| Western University of Pennsylvania: | | 3–6 | | | |
Bucknell (Independent) (1899–1906)
| 1899 | Bucknell | 6–4–1 | | | |
| 1900 | Bucknell | 3–5–1 | | | |
| 1901 | Bucknell | 6–4 | | | |
| 1902 | Bucknell | 6–4 | | | |
| 1903 | Bucknell | 4–5 | | | |
| 1904 | Bucknell | 3–3 | | | |
| 1905 | Bucknell | 5–5 | | | |
| 1906 | Bucknell | 3–4–1 | | | |
Bucknell (Independent) (1909)
| 1909 | Bucknell | 3–4–2 | | | |
| Bucknell: | | 39–38–5 | | | |
| Total: | | 59–48–9 | | | |

== See also ==
- 1896 Pittsburgh Athletic Club football season
- List of college football head coaches with non-consecutive tenure
