= Tom Fennell =

American football player and coach (1875–1936)

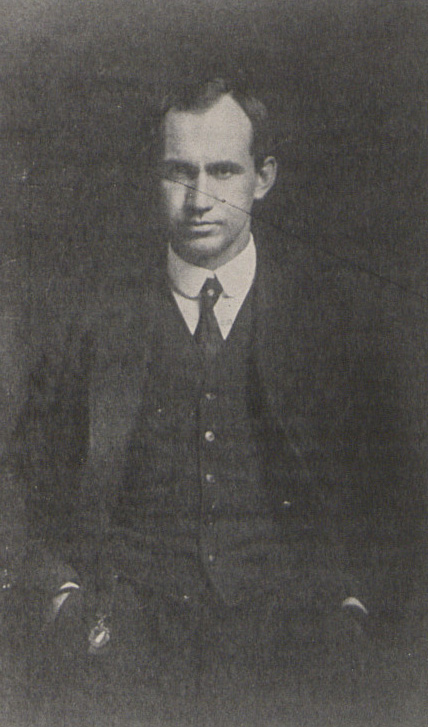
- Fennell pictured in La Vie 1908, Penn State yearbook

Biographical details
- Born: May 25, 1875; Jersey City, New Jersey, U.S.
- Died: November 4, 1936 (aged 61); New York, New York, U.S.

Playing career
- 1894–1896: Cornell

Coaching career (HC unless noted)
- 1897: Cincinnati
- 1904–1908: Penn State

Head coaching record
- Overall: 42–18–2

Thomas Francis Fennell (May 25, 1875 – November 4, 1936) was an American college football player and coach. He served as the head football coach at the University of Cincinnati in 1897 and at Pennsylvania State University from 1904 to 1908, compiling a career coaching record of 42–18–2. Fennell played football at Cornell University, where he is a member of their Athletic Hall of Fame.

Fennell was the son of Thomas McCarthy Fennell. He graduated from Cornell Law School, and was admitted to the bar. During his legal career, he was City Attorney of Elmira, County Attorney of Chemung County, and First Deputy Secretary of State of New York. In November 1910, he ran on the Republican ticket for New York State Treasurer but was defeated.

== Hall of Fame ==
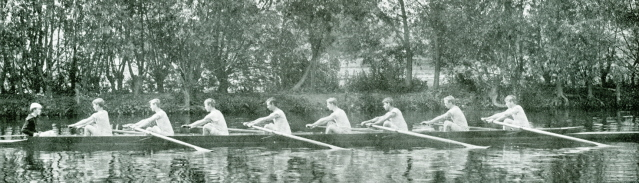
1895 Cornell varsity crew (Henley) on the Thames River; Fennell is fifth from the left

Fennell was inducted into Cornell Athletic Hall of Fame. Fennell was described as a "star" in three different sports while at Cornell: Football, Men's Crew, and Men's Track as well as being Heavyweight Champion in boxing. The Cornell Hall of Fame states that Fennell rowed on the 1895 crew that participated in England's Henley Regatta. During their second round race against Trinity Hall, Fennell fainted in the latter stages of the race and required medical attention. He was the center on the 1895 football team quarterbacked by Cornell's first All-American, Clint Wyckoff. Fennell was Penn State's first full-time head football coach and served in that capacity from 1904 to 1908, compiling a five-year record of 33-17-1, with his [19]06 team going 8-1-1. He gave up coaching to devote time to his law practice in Elmira, N.Y., and later served as a judge of the New York State Court of Claims, and as first deputy Attorney-General of New York.

Fennell's nephew, Thomas Francis Fennell II, Class of 1926, is also a Cornell Athletic Hall of Famer.

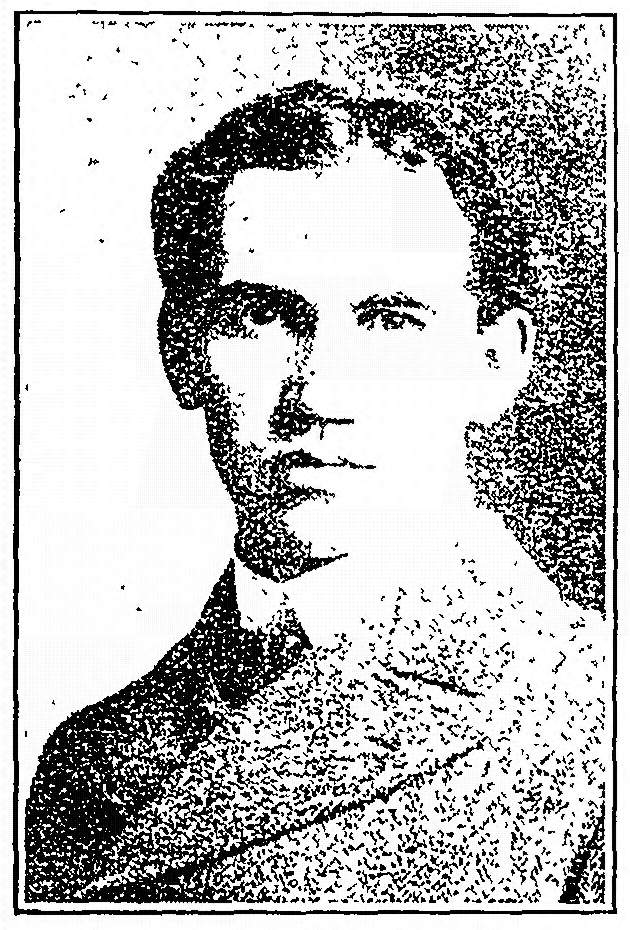
Thomas Fennell Penn State Football Coach

== Head coaching record ==
Year	Team	Overall	Conference	Standing	Bowl/playoffs
Cincinnati (Independent) (1897)
1897	Cincinnati	9–1–1			
Cincinnati:		9–1–1			
Penn State / Penn State Nittany Lions (Independent) (1904–1908)
1904	Penn State	6–4			
1905	Penn State	8–3			
1906	Penn State	8–1–1			
1907	Penn State	6–4			
1908	Penn State	5–5			
Cincinnati:		33–17–1			
Total:		42–18–2			

Party political offices
Preceded by Thomas B. Dunn	Republican nominee for New York State Treasurer; 1910	Succeeded by William Archer
